= Flying High (musical) =

- Sheet music cover (cropped)
- Music: Ray Henderson
- Lyrics: Lew Brown and B. G. de Sylva
- Book: B. G. de Sylva, Lew Brown, and Jack McGowan
- Productions: 1930 Broadway

Flying High is a musical comedy with book by B. G. DeSylva, Lew Brown, and Jack McGowan, lyrics by B. G. DeSylva and Lew Brown, music by Ray Henderson. Set in Manhattan and Newark, New Jersey, the musical is about an inventor, Rusty Krouse, who is attempting to enter his "Aerocopter", in the upcoming 10th Annual Air Show at an airport.

Produced by George White, the Broadway production opened on March 3, 1930 at the Apollo Theatre for a total run of 355 performances. The cast included Bert Lahr as Rusty Krouse, Oscar Shaw as Tod Addison, Kate Smith as Pansy Sparks, Russ Brown as Sport, Pearl Osgood as Bunny McHugh, Grace Brinkley as Eileen Cassidy, and the Gale Sisters: Jean Gale, June Gale, Joan Gale, and Jane Gale.

This was the last of the DeSylva, Brown and Henderson Broadway musicals.

It was adapted into a 1931 film of the same name.

== Songs ==
Act I

- I'll Know Him
- Wasn't It Beautiful While It Lasted?
- Air Minded
- The First Time for Me
- Flying High
- Thank Your Father
- Happy Landing
- Good For You – Bad For Me
- Red Hot Chicago

Act II

- Rusty's Up in the Air
- Without Love
- Mrs. Krause's Blue-Eyed Baby Boy
- I'll Get My Man

== See also ==
- Flying High (1931 film)
