= Joan Gale =

American actress

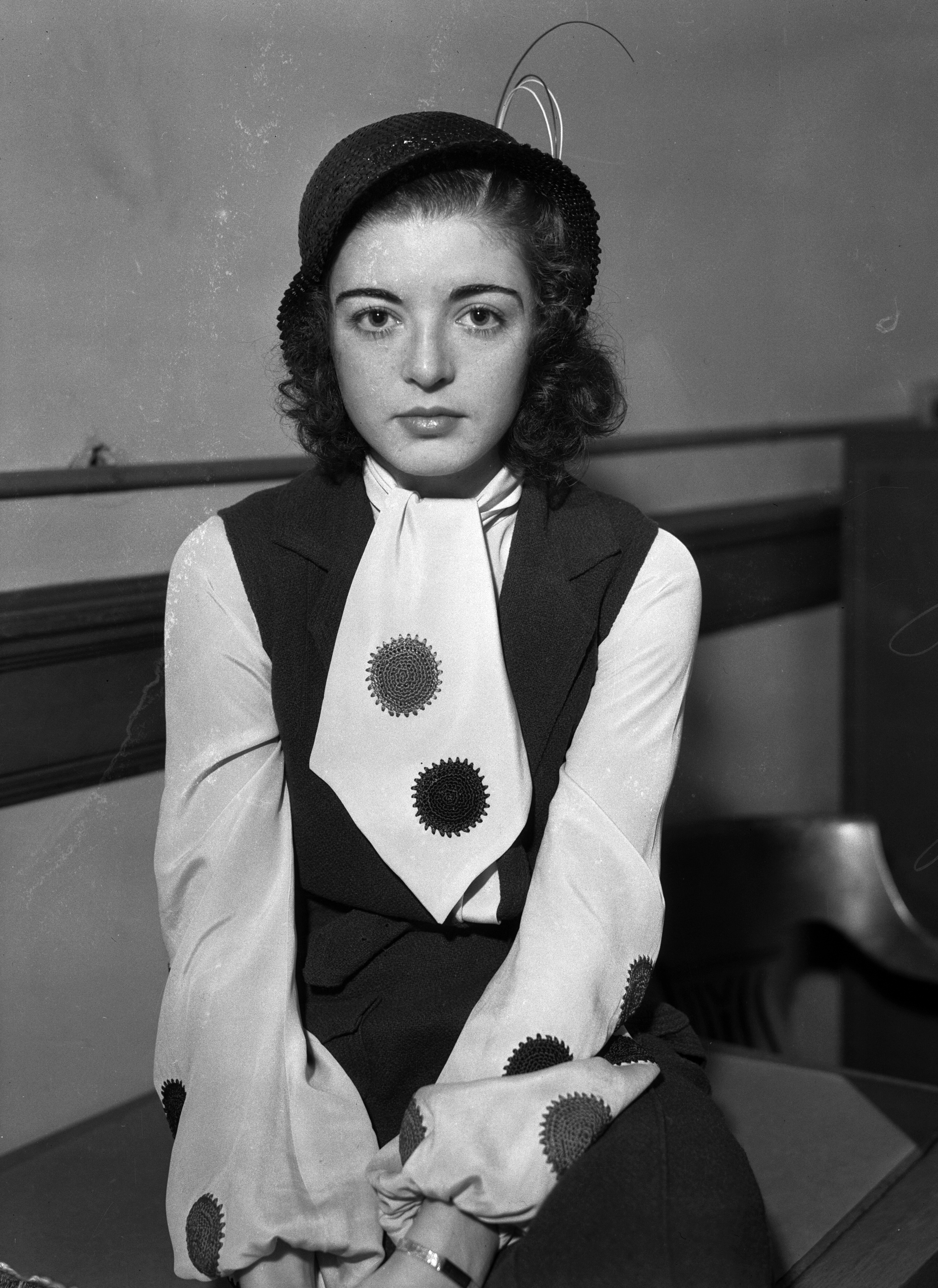
- Gale in the 1930s
- Born: September 13, 1912
- Died: June 11, 1998 (aged 85)
- Occupation: Actress
- Spouse: Lew Schreiber
- Children: 1

Joan Gale, born Lorraine Gilmartin, (September 13, 1912 – June 11, 1998) was a vaudeville performer as part of the Gale Sisters and a film actress. She was the twin sister of Jean Gale and performed with a second set of twin sisters (June Gale and Jane Gale) from the same family touring in shows as the Gale Sisters. She appeared in several Mascot Pictures productions, e. g. The Last of the Mohicans (1932) and The Miracle Rider (1935).

On Broadway, Gale and her sisters appeared as the Gale Quadruplets in Flying High (1930) and George White's Scandals (1931).

Gale married Lew Schreiber, a casting director for 20th Century Fox. They had a daughter.

== Filmography ==
- Outlawed Guns (1935) as Marge Ellsworth
- The Miracle Rider (1935), a serial, as Ruth
- The Nut Farm (1935) as Agatha Sliscomb
- The Blind Date bit part
- Hollywood Here We Come (1934) short film
- Blind Date (1934) as Flora
- Kiss and Make-Up (1934) as a salon worker
- Melody in Spring (1934) as Suzan
- Poor Little Rich Boy (1934) short film as part of The Gale Sisters
- The Last of the Mohicans (1932 serial) as a Native American maiden
