= Grace Brinkley =

American broadway actress (1904–1940)

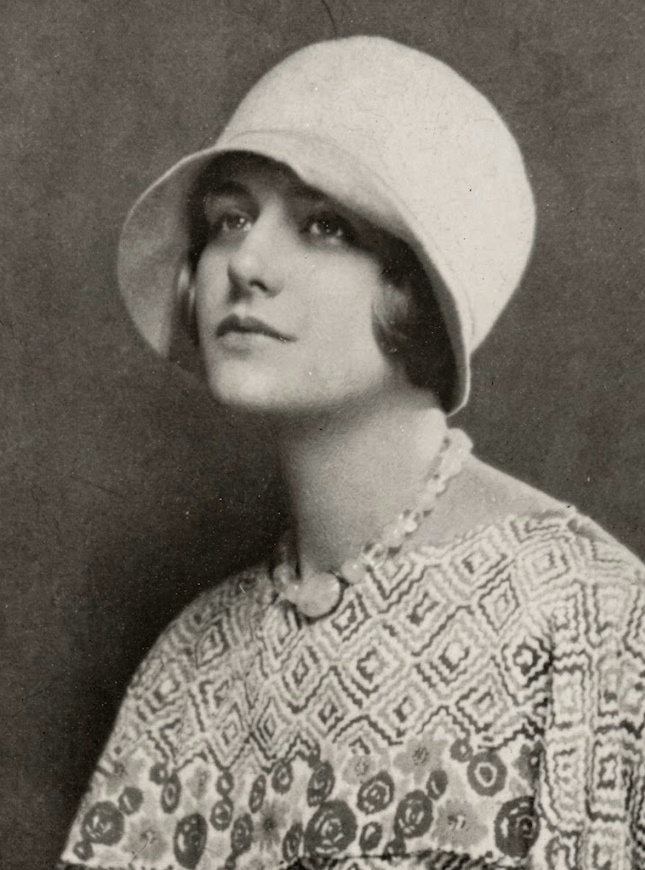
- Brinkley while performing in The Greenwich Village Follies, 1928
- Born: Grace L. Darby; April 9, 1904 (Note: Birth date determined from grave stone inscription, posted on findagrave.com); St. Louis, Missouri, United States
- Died: April 19, 1940 (aged 36); New York, United States
- Resting place: Calvary Cemetery, New York
- Occupation: Actress
- Spouse(s): Arthur Brown (m. 1928–1929) Joseph T. P. Sullivan (m. 1933–1940)

Grace Brinkley (born Grace Lillian Darby; 1904 – April 19, 1940) was an American musical theater actress and singer. Trained as a classical soprano at the Municipal Opera in St. Louis, Missouri, she appeared in several Broadway theatre productions during the late 1920s and early 1930s. Her Broadway credits include The Greenwich Village Follies, Flying High and Of Thee I Sing, the latter of which was the first musical to win the Pulitzer Prize for Drama in 1932. Alongside her stage career, she also appeared on NBC radio during the early years of broadcasting.

Brinkley began performing professionally while still a school student, performing in vaudeville while studying music in St. Louis and won several scholarships for her singing and dancing, before moving to New York. She was praised in her performances, particularly her classically trained soprano voice. After marrying lawyer Joseph T. P. Sullivan in 1933, she retired from the stage and died in New York in 1940 at the age of 36.

== Early life ==
Grace Brinkley was born Grace L. Darby in St. Louis, Missouri, in 1904, to William Neil Darby and Emma Darby. At the age of 10, she began vocal training with Madame Pattino, then a well-known vocal coach.

In August 1918 when aged 14, she took part in what a local newspaper described as an "oriental vaudeville show", alongside seven other girls, to help raise money towards a babies fund. The event raised money for a babies' welfare fund, supporting families affected by World War I. Aged 15, she enrolled at a night school of the Municipal Opera, among 500 others, where she trained for five years. While continuing her school studies, she also appeared at local theaters. She secured the leading female role in the musical The Prince of Pilsen, after the main actress chose to take a break. In the 1920 United States census, her occupation was listed as a singer in the Vaudeville industry.

== Theater career ==
Brinkley trained as a classically educated singer, studying at the Municipal Opera in St. Louis. She won several scholarships from the Municipal Theater Association for her "excellent work during the annual summer seasons", including one for $500 in August 1923 for her "exceptional singing and dancing work". One of her earlier roles was a leading cast member in the musical comedy The Cocoanuts during 1926. On securing the role, a casting agent had seen her photograph and tuned in to a radio broadcast of one of her performances. Impressed by her voice, she was invited for the part, replacing Frances Williams.

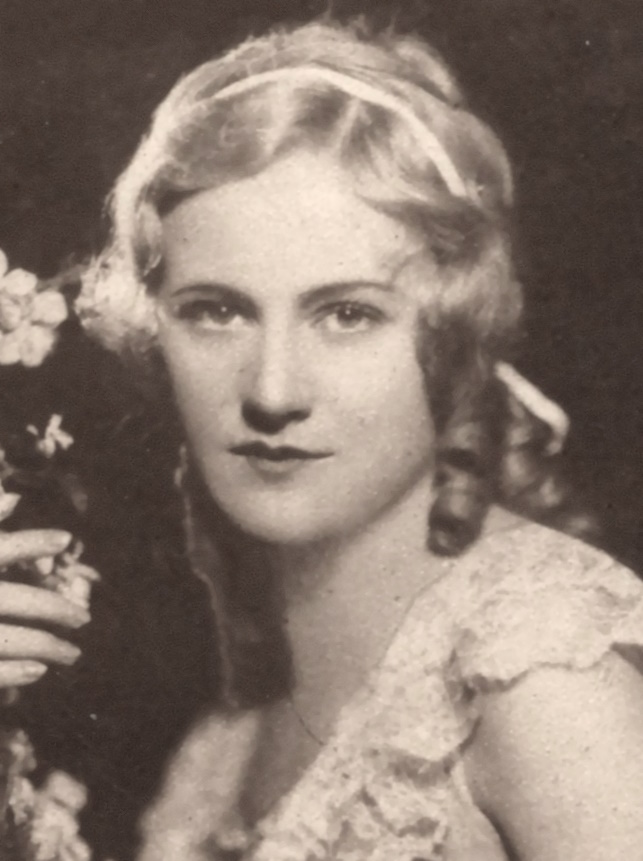
Brinkley while performing in White Lilacs, 1928

She gained wider attention in The Greenwich Village Follies in 1928, where her performance of the song Little Boy Blue attracted favorable reviews from critics. The Brooklyn Daily Times described her as "one of the foremost features" and "one of the most talented principals" of the show. The Evening Courier described her as "charming" and her performance of Little Boy Blue as "outstanding". From this performance, she secured a six year contract with the company, described at the time as one of the longest then signed by a comedy singer. She was described by The Buffalo Times as "one of the greatest finds in years".

In October 1928, it was reported by the Brooklyn Times-Union that she had been engaged for the following summer to sing leading roles in Germany's Dresden Grand Opera Company, including Aida, Der Rosenkavalier and Pique Dame. In 1930, while performing in Flying High, she took time out of the show for several weeks to recover after surgery for tonsillitis, returning in August 1930. She appeared in a principal role in the Broadway production of Here Goes the Bride in 1931.

Her last Broadway credit was in the musical Of Thee I Sing during 1931–33, as Diana Devereaux. In 1932, it became the first musical to receive the Pulitzer Prize for Drama. When reviewing the musical in January 1933, the Brooklyn Eagle remarked that Brinkley "sang delightfully" and was "the only real singer in the cast". Following her marriage that same month, Brinkley announced she would retire from the stage in February 1933, following her engagements in Washington and Philadelphia. By May 1933, she was reported to have left the production, having been replaced in her role by Betty Allen.

== Radio ==
Alongside her stage work, Brinkley appeared on NBC radio variety programmes. In May 1928, she took part in a special NBC Blue Network broadcast, presenting highlights from The Greenwich Village Follies, which she was performing at the Winter Garden Theatre in New York.

== Personal life ==
Her first marriage was to night club singer Arthur Brown on February 4, 1928, after a courtship of only three weeks. In October the same year, he was found with another woman in a hotel room by a private detective. She initiated divorce proceedings in January 1929, which was granted the following month.

She subsequently married fellow divorcee and lawyer Joseph T. P. Sullivan in January 1933. Sullivan had previously been married to Agnes E. McGuire until January 1932. Brinkley had given her name as Grace D. Warshauer when registering the marriage, although her reason for using this surname is unclear. After marrying, she gradually left the stage, preferring radio work to theater touring.

The 1940 United States census, taken in early April 1940 just weeks before her death, recorded her as a housewife with no personal income. (Note: Ancestry incorrectly translated her name on the census as 'Grace Sullcraw')

=== Death ===
She died in April 1940 at her home in New York, aged 36. She was survived by her husband and 5-year-old son.

== Acting credits ==
Brinkley has six Broadway acting credits to her name:

- The Greenwich Village Follies (1928)
- White Lilacs (1928) as Delphine Potocka
- Pleasure Bound (1929)
- Flying High (1930), opposite Bert Lahr
- Here Goes the Bride (1931)
- Of Thee I Sing (1931–33) as Diana Devereaux
