= Neoma Judge =

American actress (1908–1978)

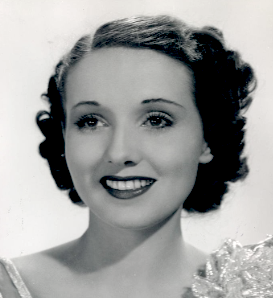
- Judge in 1936
- Born: September 27, 1908; Mitchell, South Dakota, U.S.
- Died: June 7, 1978 (aged 69); Daly City, California U.S.
- Other names: Naomi Judge
- Occupation: Actress
- Years active: 1932–1936
- Spouse(s): Charles Jordan (m. 19??)

Neoma Judge (September 27, 1908 – June 7, 1978) was an actress of the 1930s. She was also known as Naomi Judge.

== Early life ==
Judge was the daughter of Stephen Judge and Margaret Ellen Judge. She had eight brothers and two sisters.

== Career ==
Judge initially had no interest in acting. Although producers made efforts to sign her, she preferred to remain enrolled at St. Benedict's College, where she set records as a swimmer. She also studied at Immaculate Heart College.

Judge was of the WAMPAS Baby Stars of 1934 or one of six alternates to the chosen group of 13.

Judge's work on stage included acting with the Ben Bard Dramatic Groups in California.

== Personal life ==
Judge was married to Charles Jordan.

== Filmography ==
- The Man from Arizona (1932) as Lupita
- Young Blood (1932) Lola Montaine, the Countess
- Terror Trail (1933) as Norma Laird
- Young and Beautiful (1934)
- Waterfront Lady (1935) as Mrs. DeLacy
- Snowed Under (1936)
- The Golden Arrow (1936) as Mrs. Clarke
- Gold Diggers of 1937 (1936)
