= Outlawed Guns =

1935 film by Ray Taylor

- Theatrical release poster
- Directed by: Ray Taylor
- Screenplay by: John T. Neville
- Produced by: Buck Jones
- Starring: Buck Jones; Ruth Channing; Frank McGlynn, Sr. Roy D'Arcy; Pat J. O'Brien; Joseph W. Girard
- Cinematography: William A. Sickner; Allen Q. Thompson
- Edited by: Bernard Loftus
- Music by: Oliver Wallace
- Production company: Universal Pictures
- Distributed by: Universal Pictures
- Release date: July 29, 1935
- Running time: 62 minutes
- Country: United States
- Language: English

Outlawed Guns is a 1935 American Western film directed by Ray Taylor and written by John T. Neville. The film stars Buck Jones, Ruth Channing, Frank McGlynn, Sr., Roy D'Arcy, Pat J. O'Brien and Joseph W. Girard. The film was released on July 29, 1935, by Universal Pictures.

== Cast ==
- Buck Jones as Buck Rivers
- Ruth Channing as Ruth Ellsworth
- Frank McGlynn, Sr. as Jingle
- Roy D'Arcy as Jack Keeler
- Pat J. O'Brien as Babe Rivers
- Joseph W. Girard as Sheriff Rocky Ellsworth
- Joan Gale as Marge Ellsworth
- Lee Shumway as Henchman Blacky Bates
- Charles King as Henchman Frank Davilla
- Jack Rockwell as Deputy Harvey Daniels
- Silver as Silver

== Critical reception ==
Fred Baehler of Motion Picture Herald wrote that the star, Buck Jones and his horse, Trigger, were the main selling points of a film that offered the "typical fare ... fast driving, quick shooting, hand-to-hand fighting all against the background of the West" of Jones' previous films. He also commented, "While the story seems to have jumped several logical sequences, the action is well-paced. The photography, particularly on the outdoor scenes, is good."
