= The Miracle Rider =

1935 film by B. Reeves Eason, Armand Schaefer

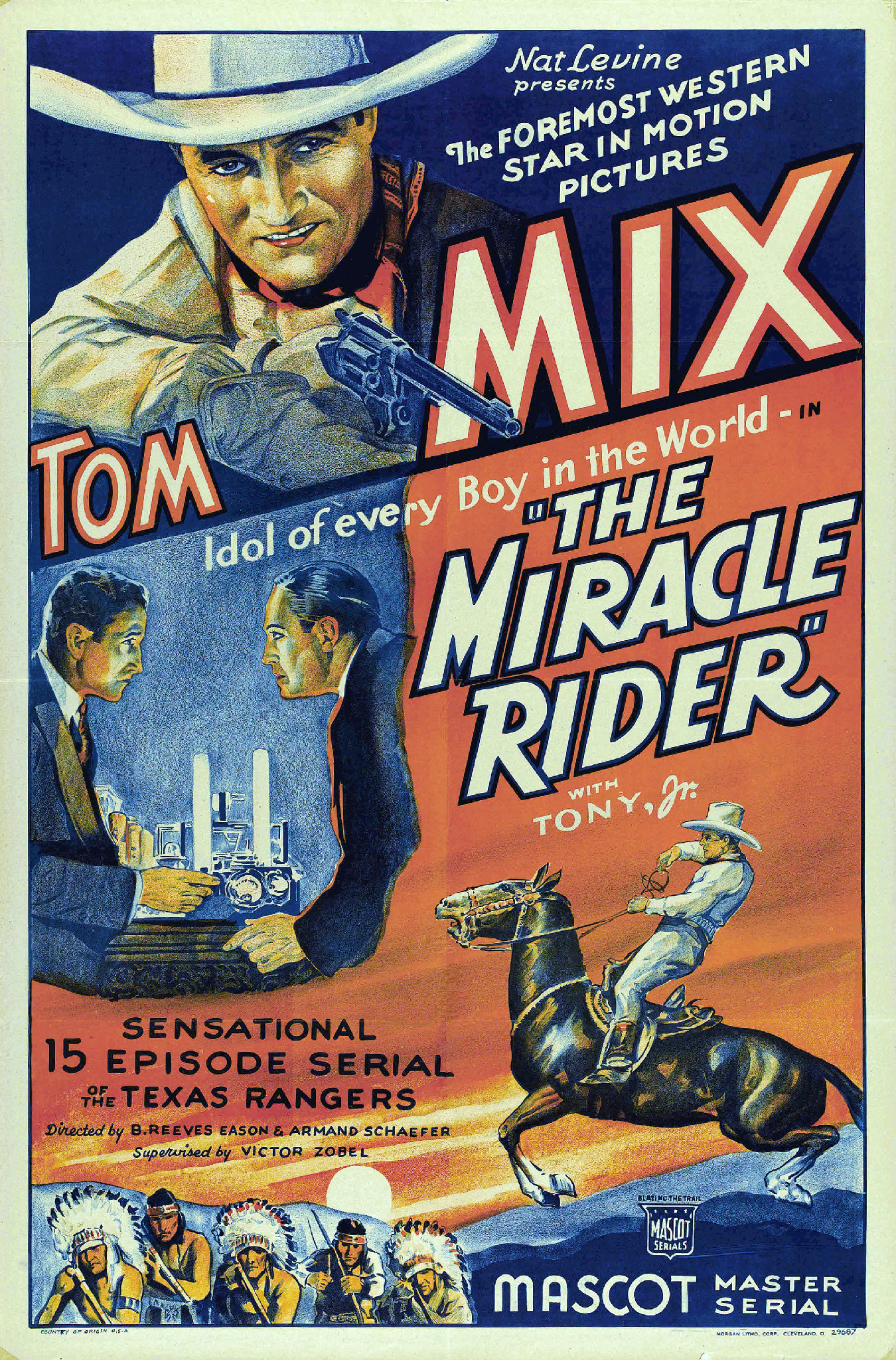
- Theatrical release poster
- Directed by: B. Reeves Eason; Armand Schaefer
- Written by: Barney A. Sarecky; Wellyn Totman
- Produced by: Nat Levine; Barney A. Sarecky
- Starring: Tom Mix; Joan Gale; Charles Middleton
- Cinematography: Ernest Miller; William Nobles
- Edited by: Richard Fantl
- Music by: Nem Herkan
- Production company: Mascot Pictures
- Distributed by: Mascot Pictures
- Release date: April 12, 1935
- Running time: 15 chapters (306 minutes)
- Country: United States
- Language: English

The Miracle Rider is a 1935 American Western film serial directed by B. Reeves Eason and Armand Schaefer for Mascot. It stars silent movie cowboy star Tom Mix in his last major film role.

== Plot summary ==
Zaroff (Charles Middleton), a rancher and oil company owner, wants to drive the Ravenhead Indians off their reservation so that he can mine the rare element X-94, a super explosive, found there and sell it to the highest bidder. Texas Ranger Tom Morgan tries to stop him and save the tribe.

== Cast ==
- Tom Mix as Tom Morgan, Texas Ranger
- Joan Gale as Ruth
- Charles Middleton as Zaroff, a rancher and oil company owner
- Robert Frazer as Chief Black Wing
- Niles Welch as Metzger
- Jason Robards Sr. as Carlton
- Bob Kortman as Longboat
- Edward Earle as Christopher Adams, Indian Agent
- Edward Hearn as Emil Janss
- Tom London as Sewell, one of Zaroff's henchmen
- Edmund Cobb as Vining, one of Zaroff's henchmen
- Ernie Adams as John Stelter
- Max Wagner as Morley, one of Zaroff's henchmen
- Charles King as Hatton, one of Zaroff's henchmen
- Stanley Price as Chapman, one of Zaroff's henchmen
- George Chesebro as Crossman, Janss Hand
- Tex Cooper as Buffalo Bill (uncredited)
- Bud Geary as Davy Crockett (uncredited)
- Pat O'Malley as Capt. Sam Morgan (uncredited)
- Jay Wilsey as Daniel Boone/Henchmen (uncredited)

== Production ==
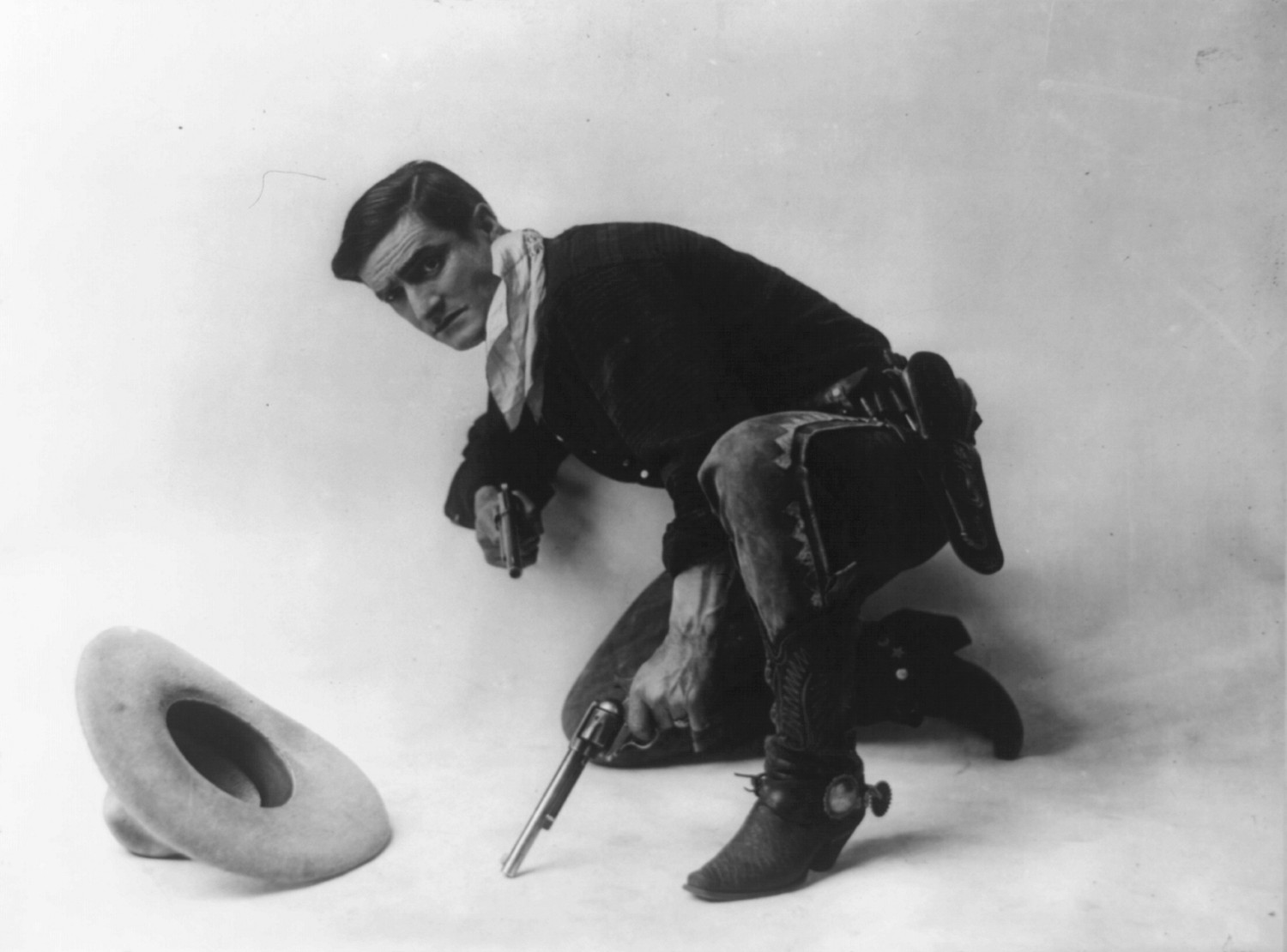
Tom Mix

This was Tom Mix's last film and his only sound serial. Tom Mix was still an A-list star in 1935, alongside Charles Chaplin, Douglas Fairbanks, Sr. and Mary Pickford. He was paid $40,000 for four weeks work on The Miracle Rider, which he used as urgent funding to support his circus.

The serial combined the large cast and interlocking plots of a silent serial with the science fiction and cliffhangers of the sound era. Filming of the outdoor action sequences took place primarily at the Iverson Movie Ranch in Chatsworth, Calif., on the outskirts of Los Angeles. The movie ranch, which had been in use as a filming location since the early silent movie era, was known for its rugged landscape and giant sandstone boulders. One of those boulders became known as Tom Mix Rock in later years, after it was discovered that bootholes had been carved in the rock to help the actor shoot a scene atop the rock for The Miracle Rider.

=== Stunts ===
Tom Mix, whose voice was strained and nasal due to a repeatedly broken nose and a bullet through his throat, did a lot of his own stunts, although some were doubled by Cliff Lyons.

== Chapter titles ==
1. The Vanishing Indian
2. The Firebird Strikes
3. The Flying Knife
4. A Race with Death
5. Double Barreled Doom
6. Thundering Hoofs [sic]
7. The Dragnet
8. Guerilla Warfare
9. The Silver Road
10. Signal Fires
11. A Traitor Dies
12. Danger Rides with Death
13. The Secret of X-94
14. Between Two Fires
15. Justice Rides the Plains

_{Source:}

This was Mascot's only 15-chapter serial.

"Zaroff" is obviously inspired by Basil Zaharoff, a notorious early twentieth-century arms merchant, often cited as one of the so-called "merchants of death", who supposedly helped bring on World War I.

== See also ==
- List of film serials
- List of film serials by studio

Preceded by The Phantom Empire (1935)	Mascot Serial; The Miracle Rider (1935)	Succeeded by The Adventures of Rex and Rinty (1935)
