= Blind Date (1934 film) =

1934 film by Roy William Neill

- Film poster
- Directed by: Roy William Neill
- Written by: Vida Hurst
- Screenplay by: Ethel Hill; Adele Buffington
- Based on: Blind Date; 1931 novel by Vida Hurst
- Produced by: Robert North
- Starring: Ann Sothern; Neil Hamilton; Paul Kelly
- Cinematography: Al Siegler
- Edited by: Gene Havlick
- Distributed by: Columbia Pictures
- Release date: July 20, 1934
- Running time: 72 minutes
- Country: United States
- Language: English

Blind Date is a 1934 American drama film directed by Roy William Neill and starring Ann Sothern, Neil Hamilton, and Paul Kelly.

== Plot ==
Kitty (Ann Sothern), is a hardworking switchboard operator who is engaged to auto mechanic Bill (Paul Kelly). When Bill opens his own garage, the demands of running his own business soon take a toll on his relationship with Kitty. Frustrated, Kitty agrees to go on a blind date with Bob (Neil Hamilton), the wealthy son of a department store titan. When sparks fly, Kitty is soon forced to make a difficult choice between the two men.

== Cast ==
- Ann Sothern as Kitty Taylor
- Neil Hamilton as Bob Hartwell
- Paul Kelly as Bill Lowry
- Jane Darwell as Ma Taylor
- Spencer Charters as Charlie [Pa] Taylor
- Joan Gale as Flora Taylor
- Mickey Rooney as Freddie Taylor
- Geneva Mitchell as Dot
- Henry Kolker as J. W. Hartwell Sr.
- Tyler Brooke as Emory
- Billie Seward as Barbara Hartwell
