= Young Blood (1932 film) =

1932 film

- Directed by: Phil Rosen
- Written by: Wellyn Totman
- Produced by: Trem Carr
- Starring: Bob Steele; Helen Foster; Charles King
- Cinematography: Archie Stout
- Edited by: Carl Pierson
- Music by: Lee Zahler
- Production company: Trem Carr Pictures
- Distributed by: Monogram Pictures
- Release date: November 5, 1932 (US)
- Running time: 61 minutes
- Country: United States
- Language: English

Young Blood is a 1932 American pre-Code Western film directed by Phil Rosen and starring Bob Steele, Helen Foster, and Charles King. It was released on November 5, 1932.

== Cast ==
- Bob Steele as Nick, "The Kid"
- Helen Foster as Gail Winters
- Charles King as Sheriff Jake Sharpe
- Neoma Judge as Lola Montaine
- Harry Semels as Tony Murullo
- Henry Roquemore as Beckworth
- Henry Hall as the Mayor
- Hank Bell as the Deputy sheriff
- Art Mix as Ed
- Perry Murdock as Hank
