= Dorothy Layton =

American actress

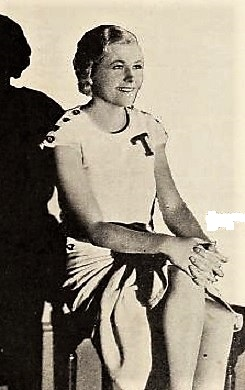
- Born: Dorothy Ann Wannenwetsch; August 13, 1912; Cincinnati, Ohio, U.S.
- Died: June 4, 2009 (aged 96); Towson, Maryland, U.S.
- Years active: 1931–1933
- Spouse: Howard Milton Taylor Jr.

Dorothy Layton (August 13, 1912 – June 4, 2009) was an American film actress of the early 1930s.

== Life ==
Born as Dorothy Ann Wannenwetsch in Cincinnati, Ohio, Layton was selected as one of the "WAMPAS Baby Stars" for 1932. Layton acted in eight films in 1932 and 1933, appearing several times with Laurel and Hardy. She appeared in the films Chickens Come Home (1931), The Chimp, County Hospital, and Pack Up Your Troubles (all 1932). Her London Telegraph obituary described her as their "last great female stooge."

The only film she made of any prominence, however, was Pick-Up (1933), which starred George Raft and Sylvia Sidney.

In 1934, Layton left the motion picture industry and moved to Baltimore, Maryland, where she met and married Howard W. Taylor Jr., a Baltimore businessman who sold mattresses. The couple had two children, a son and daughter. The marriage ended in divorce. Dorothy Layton died on June 4, 2009, at a retirement home in Towson, Maryland, aged 96.
