= Fiesta (1941 film) =

1941 film by LeRoy Prinz

- Directed by: LeRoy Prinz
- Screenplay by: Cortland Fitzsimmons; Kenneth Higgins
- Story by: Alfred Gilks
- Produced by: LeRoy Prinz
- Starring: Ann Ayars; Jorge Negrete; Armida; George Givot
- Narrated by: Robert C. Bruce
- Cinematography: Robert Pittack
- Edited by: Bert Jordan
- Music by: Edward Ward
- Production company: Hal Roach Studios
- Distributed by: United Artists
- Release date: 28 November 1941
- Running time: 45 minutes
- Country: United States
- Language: English
- Budget: $178,044
- Box office: $195,936

Fiesta is a 1941 American Technicolor musical film directed by LeRoy Prinz that was one of Hal Roach's Streamliners. The film was the motion picture debut of the Los Angeles Civic Light Opera star Anne Ayars.

The film was re-released in 1948 by Favorite Films and retitled Gaiety.

== Plot summary ==
Don Juan Hernández's niece Cholita returns to her village from Mexico City announcing she will not marry José, her village boyfriend, bur rather the radio star Fernando Gómez who has accompanied her home. José enlists two of his friends to pose as bandits to frighten the arrogant and cowardly Fernando and win Cholita back.

== Cast ==
- Ann Ayars as Cholita
- Jorge Negrete as José
- Armida as Cuca
- George Givot as Fernando Gómez
- Antonio Moreno as Don Hernandez, Cholita's Uncle
- Nick Moro as Pedro
- Frank Yaconelli as Pablo
- George Humbert as Pancho
- Francisco Moreno as Paco
- Betty Bryson as Pancho's Wife
- Carlos Valadez as Oaxoco Plume Dancer
- José Arias as Leader of the Mexican Tipica Orchestra
- The Guadalajara Trio as Band
- Tipíca Orchestra of the Mexico City Police as Orchestra
- Robert C. Bruce as the Narrator

== Soundtrack ==
- Ann Ayars - "I'll Never Forget Fiesta" (music by Nilo Meléndez, lyrics by Chet Forrest and Bob Wright)
- Jorge Negrete - "Ride Mi Caballeros"
- Armida with The Guadalajara Trio - "Never Trust a Jumping Bean" (music by Edward Ward, lyrics by Chet Forrest and Bob Wright)
- Frank Yaconelli, Earl Douglas and Nick Moro - "The Two Bravest Hombres in All Mexico" (written by Johnny Lange and Lew Porter
- Jorge Negrete - "Quien Sabe" (music by Edward Ward, lyrics by Chet Forrest and Bob Wright)
- Jorge Negrete and Ann Ayars - "Quien Sabe" (reprise) (music by Edward Ward, lyrics by Chet Forrest and Bob Wright)
- Dancers and Tipíca Orchestra of the Mexico City Police, led by José Arias - Gypsy Dance
- Jorge Negrete and The Guadalajara Trio - "El Relajo" (written by Lamberto Leyva, Jesús Castillón and Oscar Felix)
- Ann Ayars and The Guadalajara Trio - "La Golondrina" (written by Narcisco Sarradell)
