= Gale Sisters =

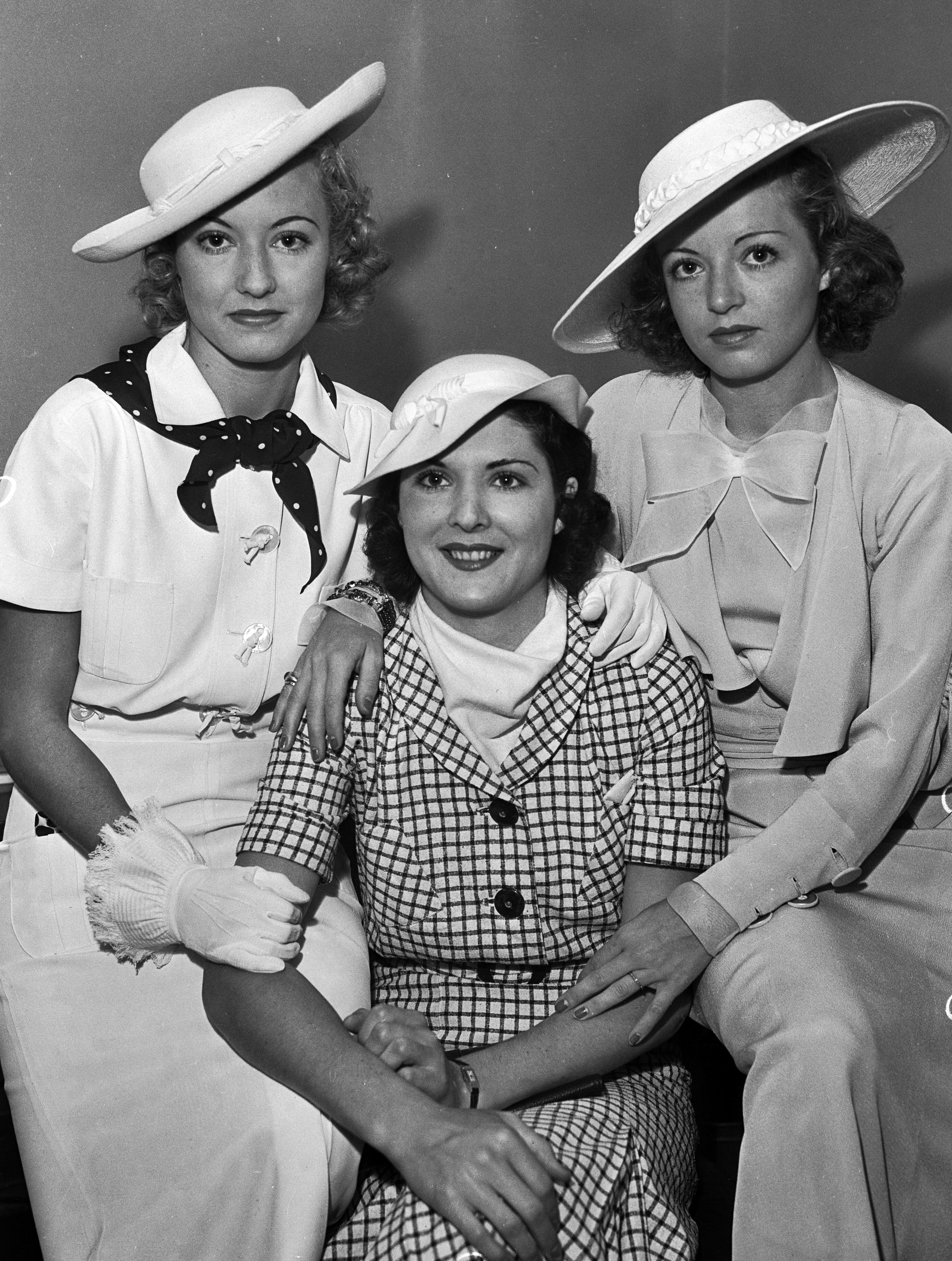
From left, June, Jean, and Joan Gale, 1935

The Gale Sisters was a family of four actresses, two sets of twins, who performed in vaudeville and movies:

- Jane Gale, born Helen Gilmartin (b. 1911), twin sister of June
- June Gale, born Doris Gilmartin (1911–1996), twin sister of Jane: wife successively of Oscar Levant and Henry Ephron
- Jean Gale, born Lenore Gilmartin (1912–1974), twin sister of Joan
- Joan Gale, born Lorraine Gilmartin (1912–1998), twin sister of Jean

The sisters were initially billed by their birth names, as in their appearance in Parisian Idea in Oakland, California, in 1928. The group entertained not only in America but also performed during a tour of Europe.

The quartet appeared on Broadway in Flying High (1930) and George White's Scandals (1931).
