= Terror Trail (1933 film) =

1933 film by Armand Schaefer

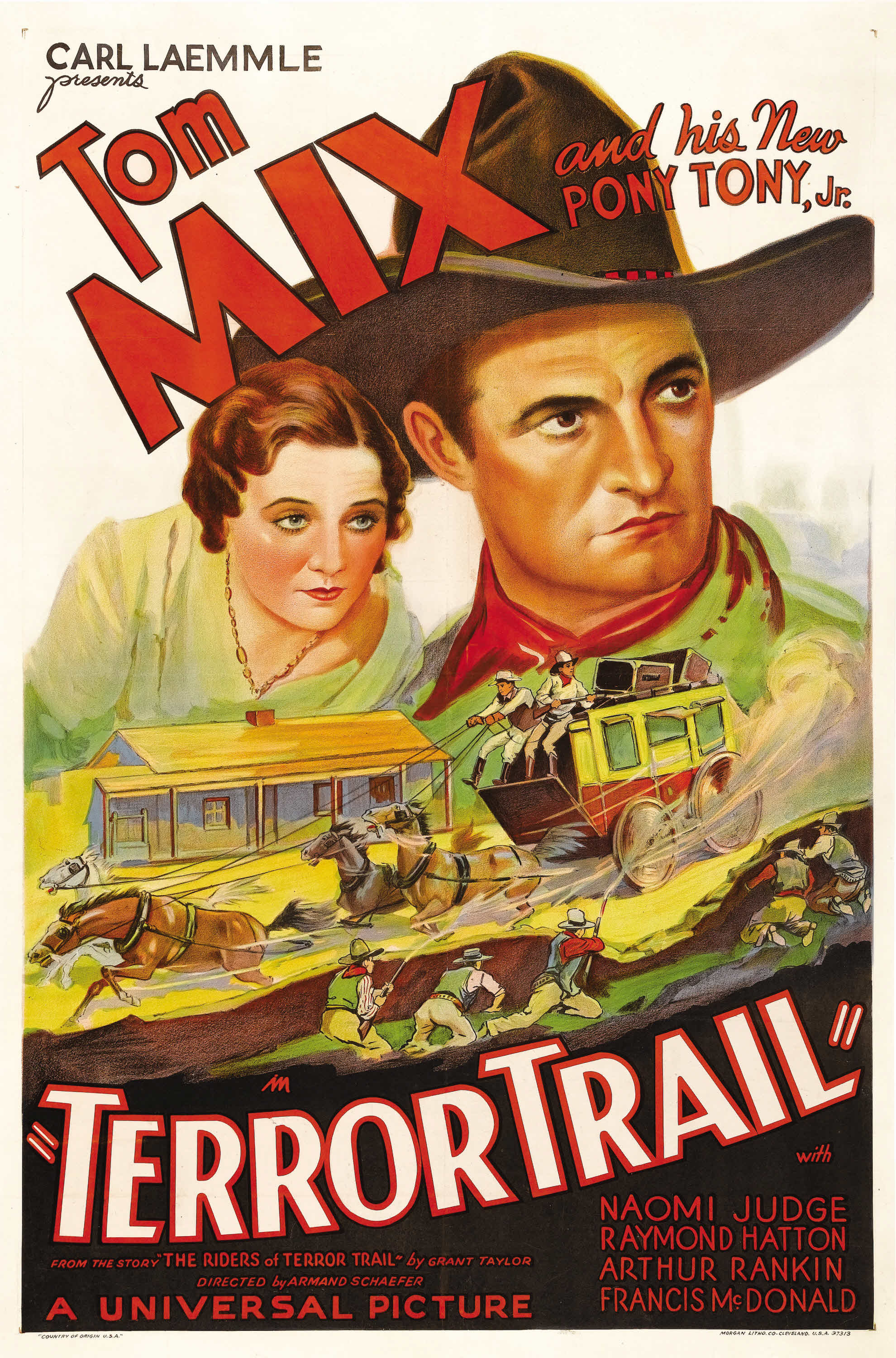
- Theatrical release poster
- Directed by: Armand Schaefer
- Screenplay by: Jack Cunningham
- Produced by: Carl Laemmle, Jr.
- Starring: Tom Mix; Naomi Judge; Arthur Rankin; John St. Polis; Frank Brownlee; Raymond Hatton
- Cinematography: Daniel B. Clark
- Edited by: Russell F. Schoengarth
- Production company: Universal Pictures
- Distributed by: Universal Pictures
- Release date: February 2, 1933
- Running time: 58 minutes
- Country: United States
- Language: English

Terror Trail is a 1933 American pre-Code Western film directed by Armand Schaefer, written by Jack Cunningham, and starring Tom Mix, Naomi Judge, Arthur Rankin, John St. Polis, Frank Brownlee and Raymond Hatton. It was released on February 2, 1933, by Universal Pictures.

== Plot ==
When the law is unable to stop Cattle rustlers due to corruption in town, Tom Mix with the help of cowboy Lucky Dawson must take on the ruthless gang.

== Cast ==
- Tom Mix as Tom Munroe
- Naomi Judge as Norma Laird
- Arthur Rankin as Bernie Laird
- John St. Polis as Colonel Charles Ormsby
- Frank Brownlee as Sheriff Judell
- Raymond Hatton as Lucky Dawson
- Francis McDonald as Tad McPherson
- Bob Kortman as Tim McPherson
- Lafe McKee as Shay
