= Berta Beeson =

American circus performer

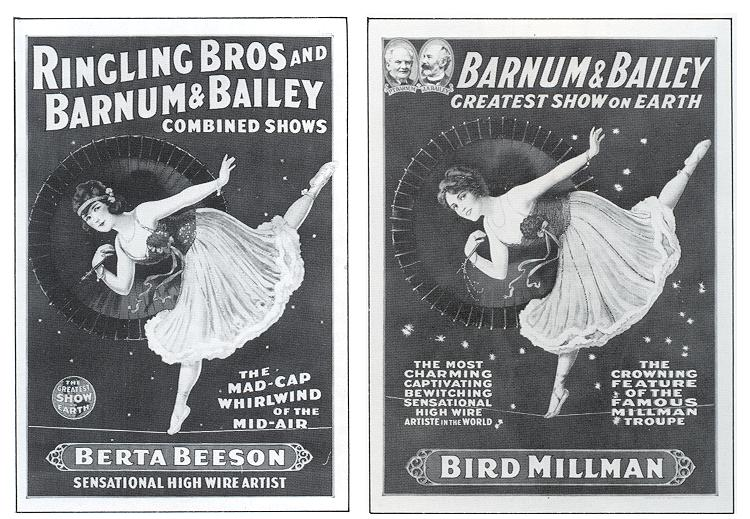
- Two nearly-identical circus posters, Beeson (left) and Millman (right).
- Born: Herbert Beeson; February 2, 1899
- Died: September 7, 1969 (aged 70); San Bernardino, California, U.S.
- Occupation: Tightrope walker
- Employers: Ringling Brothers and Barnum and Bailey Circus; Sells Floto Circus
- Spouse: Margaret Beeson

Berta Beeson (February 2, 1899 – September 7, 1969) was the stage name of Herbert "Slats" Beeson, a cross-dressing circus performer known as "The Julian Eltinge of the Wire."

== Early life ==
According to several anecdotes, he learned to dance upon the wire by imitating the routine of a young girl in the circus. Upon her sudden injury, he stepped in to take her place; in one version, the young woman for whom he inadvertently understudied became his wife. As a teenage grocery clerk in Summitville, Indiana, Beeson moonlighted at the local vaudeville house.

== Circus career ==
In 1917, the Sells Floto Circus billed him as "Mademoiselle Beeson, Marvelous High Wire Venus." During his performance in the center ring, the side rings were clear. In 1925, following Bird Millman’s retirement from circus life, the Ringling Brothers and Barnum and Bailey Circus featured Beeson as "The Mad-Cap Whirlwind of the Mid-Air". He retired from performance in 1936, but later reemerged as an advance man, traveling ahead of the show to make necessary arrangements.

== Personal life ==
Beeson died in California at the age of 70, survived by his wife Margaret.
