= The Greenwich Village Follies =

Musical revue launched by John Murray Anderson

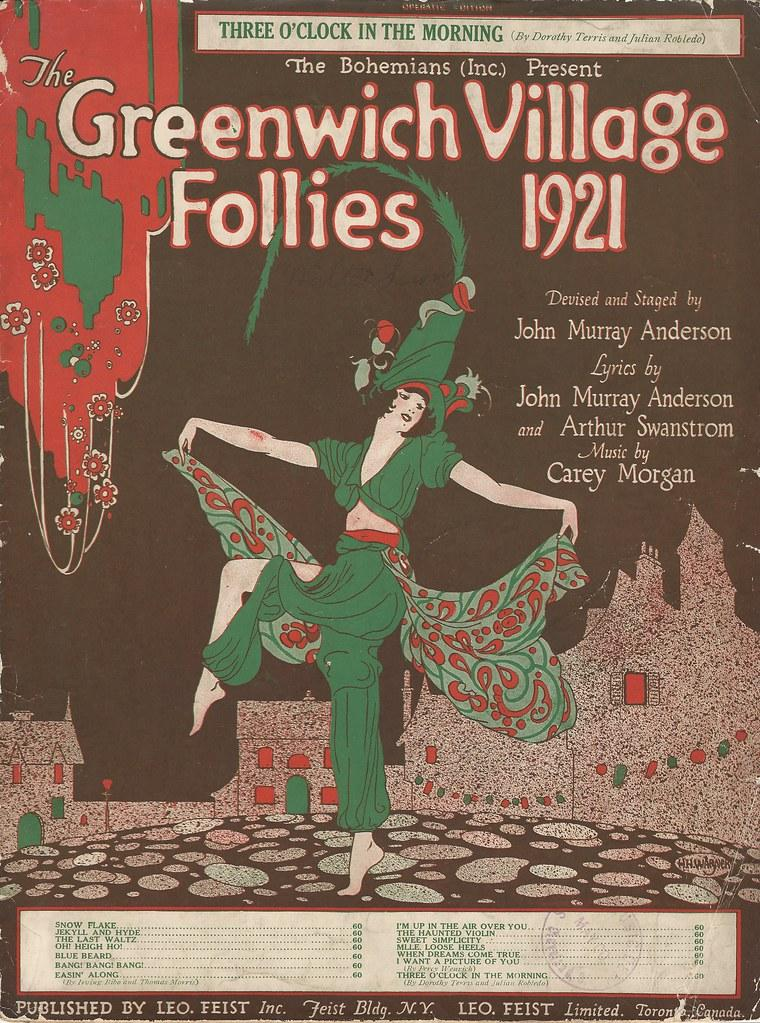
Music published by Leo Feist. Artwork by H.H. Warner

The Greenwich Village Follies was a musical revue that played for eight seasons in New York City from 1919 to 1927. Launched by John Murray Anderson, and opening on July 15, 1919, at the newly constructed Greenwich Village Theatre near Christopher Street, the show's success has been credited in part to its timing: as a non-union production, it was unaffected by the then-current actors' strike.

== From downtown to uptown ==
Though considered a pioneer in the history of Off-Broadway musicals, this annual revue actually spent very little time in its original downtown home. The first edition moved uptown soon after its opening, as did the second. By the third year, the revue simply skipped its native venue and opened at the Shubert Theatre. Typically, after a run in New York, an adapted version of the show toured the country.

== Rival revues ==
To the dismay of rival impresario Florenz Ziegfeld, Anderson changed the last word of his title from “Nights” to “Follies.” Ziegfeld did not take Anderson to court, but in the decade to come, the two Broadway moguls were often compared. Like Ziegfeld's famous Follies, Anderson's revue boasted of lavish curtains, original scores, comedy sketches, and, of course, a bevy of beautiful girls. Other peers included George White, with his Scandals; and Earl Carroll, with his Vanities.

== Featured acts ==
The first star of The Greenwich Village Follies was Ziegfeld-veteran Bessie McCoy Davis. She made several appearances in the first edition, including one as a marionette. While singing “I’m the Hostess of the Bum Cabaret,” she spoofed the recently ratified Eighteenth Amendment. The names at the top of the marquee changed from season to season. In a 1924 number titled “The Dollies and the Collies,” trained dogs danced alongside vaudeville's celebrated Dolly Sisters. Specialty acts included circus veterans, such as the wire-walking Bird Millman; female impersonators, such as Bert Savoy; and even blackface comics, such as Al Herman and comedy team of Moran and Mack. In later editions, aspiring dancers Martha Graham and Agnes DeMille made appearances.

== Music and dance ==
In 1919, a critic for The New York Times commended the collective singing talent of the cast: not only did a male quartet provide harmony, the beautiful girls who had no other obligation than to be beautiful proved to have beautiful voices as well. The following season, another newspaper critic extended high praise to the show's choreography. A year after that, however, a critic decried the show's over-reliance on dance. For nearly a decade, popular composers of the day, including Irving Berlin, Cole Porter, and Richard Rodgers, contributed tunes; but to the perpetual disappointment of the backers, the revue never seemed to produce any notable hits.

== Distinguishing qualities ==
True to its bohemian roots, the revue came to be distinguished by its socially- and intellectually-provocative content. Even so, the material appealed to the eye as well as the brain. Anderson was often noted for his striking stage pictures and his novel lighting effects. Not surprisingly, the ballad ballet became a staple of the revue. Popular stories, such as Oscar Wilde’s “The Nightingale and the Rose” and Edgar Allan Poe's “The Raven,” provided inspiration for these wordless interludes.

== Decline ==
By the late 1920s, the Broadway revue was losing patrons to story-driven book musicals like Show Boat. Anderson left the show after 1924, and the franchise went into hibernation during the seasons of 1926 and 1927. The last year the revue was produced on Broadway was 1928. At the onset of the Great Depression, the modest and short-lived Greenwich Village Theatre was demolished.

== Reinvention ==
In July 2011, the Manhattan Theatre Source reimagined The Greenwich Village Follies as an exploration of local history. Like its predecessor, this production paid homage to members of the cultural avant-garde, such as Edna St. Vincent Millay and Jackson Pollock; it also tackled gritty subjects, such as the Stonewall Uprising of 1969.
