= Betty Bryson =

American actress and dancer (1911–1984)

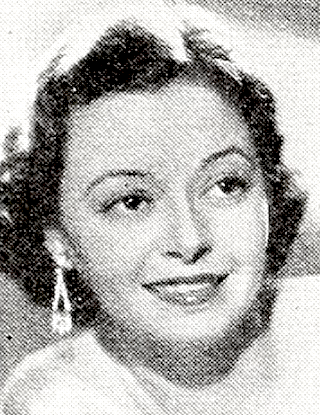
- Bryson in 1934
- Born: Elizabeth Meiklejohn; October 5, 1911; Los Angeles, California, U.S.
- Died: February 18, 1984 (aged 72); Los Angeles, California, U.S.
- Occupations: Actress, dancer
- Years active: 1933–1944
- Spouse: LeRoy Prinz (m. 1936; died 1983)
- Children: 1
- Relatives: Warner Baxter (uncle)

Betty Bryson (born Elizabeth Meiklejohn; October 5, 1911 – February 18, 1984) was an American film actress and dancer active during the 1930s and early 1940s.

She appeared primarily in musical and comedy films and was selected as one of the WAMPAS Baby Stars in 1934. While many of her roles were uncredited, Bryson was part of several major studio productions during the Golden Age of Hollywood. She was the niece of actor Warner Baxter.

== Early life ==
Bryson was born in Los Angeles, California, on October 5, 1911. Raised by her grandmother in the house where she was born, she attended Fairfax High School and later studied at finishing schools and the Pasadena Community Playhouse. She also trained at the Fox Film Corporation’s dramatic school.

Bryson was frequently noted in the press for her resemblance to actress Janet Gaynor, a comparison she described as both flattering and professionally limiting.

== Career ==
=== WAMPAS Baby Star ===
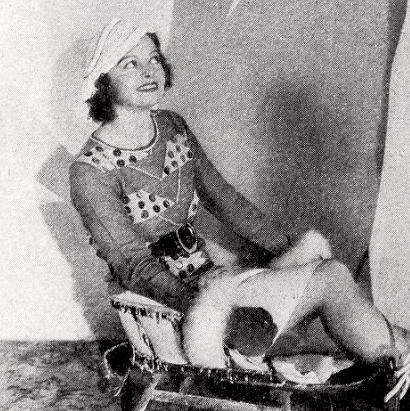
Bryson in 1934

In 1934, Bryson was named one of the year’s WAMPAS Baby Stars, a promotional campaign recognizing young actresses with potential for stardom. She appeared in the film Young and Beautiful (1934), which featured that year’s WAMPAS honorees, and took part in publicity tours and studio engagements tied to the program.

=== Film work ===
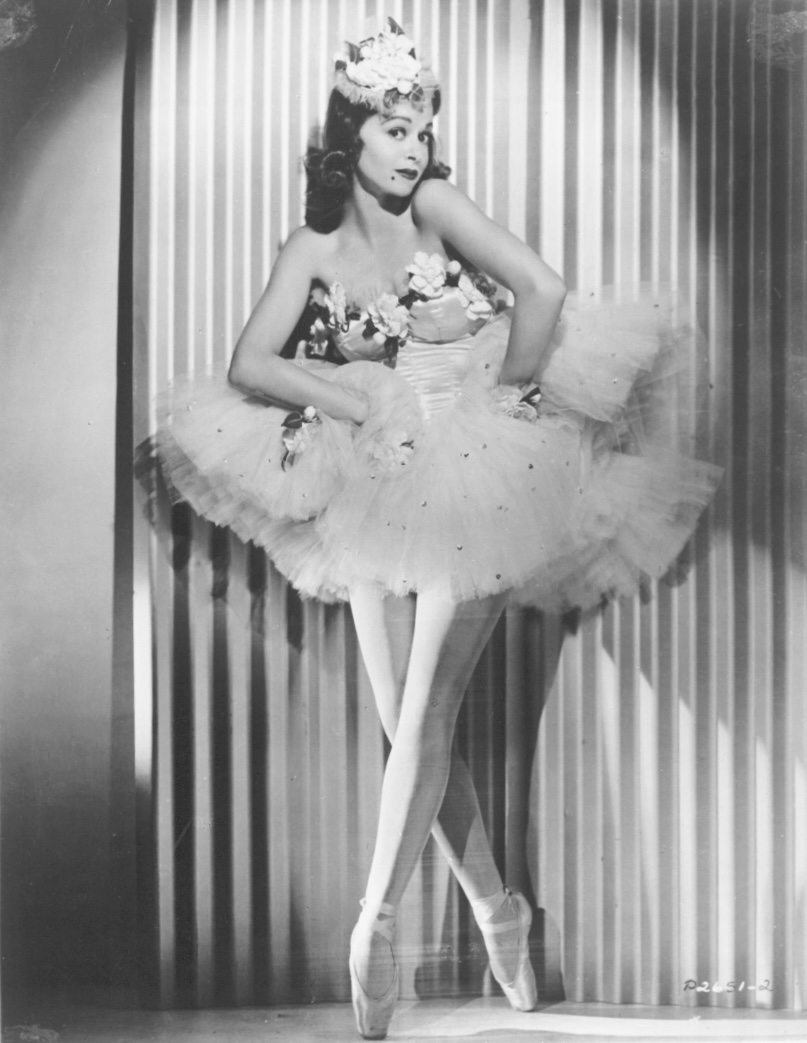
Bryson in 1939

Bryson's screen career included primarily minor and uncredited roles, most often as a dancer or supporting actress in musicals and comedies produced by major studios. Her earliest appearances were in 1933 in films such as Doctor Bull and It’s Great to Be Alive. She also had roles in Kiss and Make-Up (1934), 365 Nights in Hollywood (1934), The Great Hotel Murder (1935), and Fiesta (1941), one of her few credited performances.

She appeared in the short promotional film Hollywood on Parade No. B-13 (1934) as herself, and her later credits include uncredited roles in Shine on Harvest Moon (1944) and Hollywood Canteen (1944).

Outside of acting, Bryson wrote a syndicated beauty column in 1934 titled My Beauty Hint, which offered personal grooming tips and appeared in newspapers such as the Green Bay Press-Gazette.

== Personal life ==
On June 21, 1936, Bryson married choreographer and film director LeRoy Prinz in Yuma, Arizona. The couple’s elopement received national media coverage. Prinz, known for his choreography on major studio musicals, had previously served in the French Foreign Legion and had a colorful early career.

The couple remained married until Prinz’s death in 1983 and had one child, LeRoy Prinz Jr.

== Later years and death ==
After her final screen appearances in the mid-1940s, Bryson retired from the film industry and lived privately. She died on February 18, 1984, in Los Angeles, aged 72.

== Selected filmography ==
Year	Title	Role	Notes
1933	Doctor Bull	Actress	Uncredited
1933	It's Great to Be Alive	Dancer – Dutch Girl	Uncredited
1933	I Loved You Wednesday	Dancer	Uncredited
1934	Kiss and Make-Up	Salon Client	Uncredited
1934	Young and Beautiful	Herself	WAMPAS Baby Star
1934	Hollywood on Parade	Herself	Short film
1934	365 Nights in Hollywood	Showgirl	Uncredited
1935	The Great Hotel Murder	Irene Harvey	Uncredited
1939	The Great Victor Herbert	Ballerina	Uncredited
1941	Fiesta	Pancho’s Wife	
1944	Shine On, Harvest Moon	Soubrette	Uncredited
1944	Hollywood Canteen	Dancer	Uncredited
