= Jean Gale =

American vaudeville performer (1912–1974)

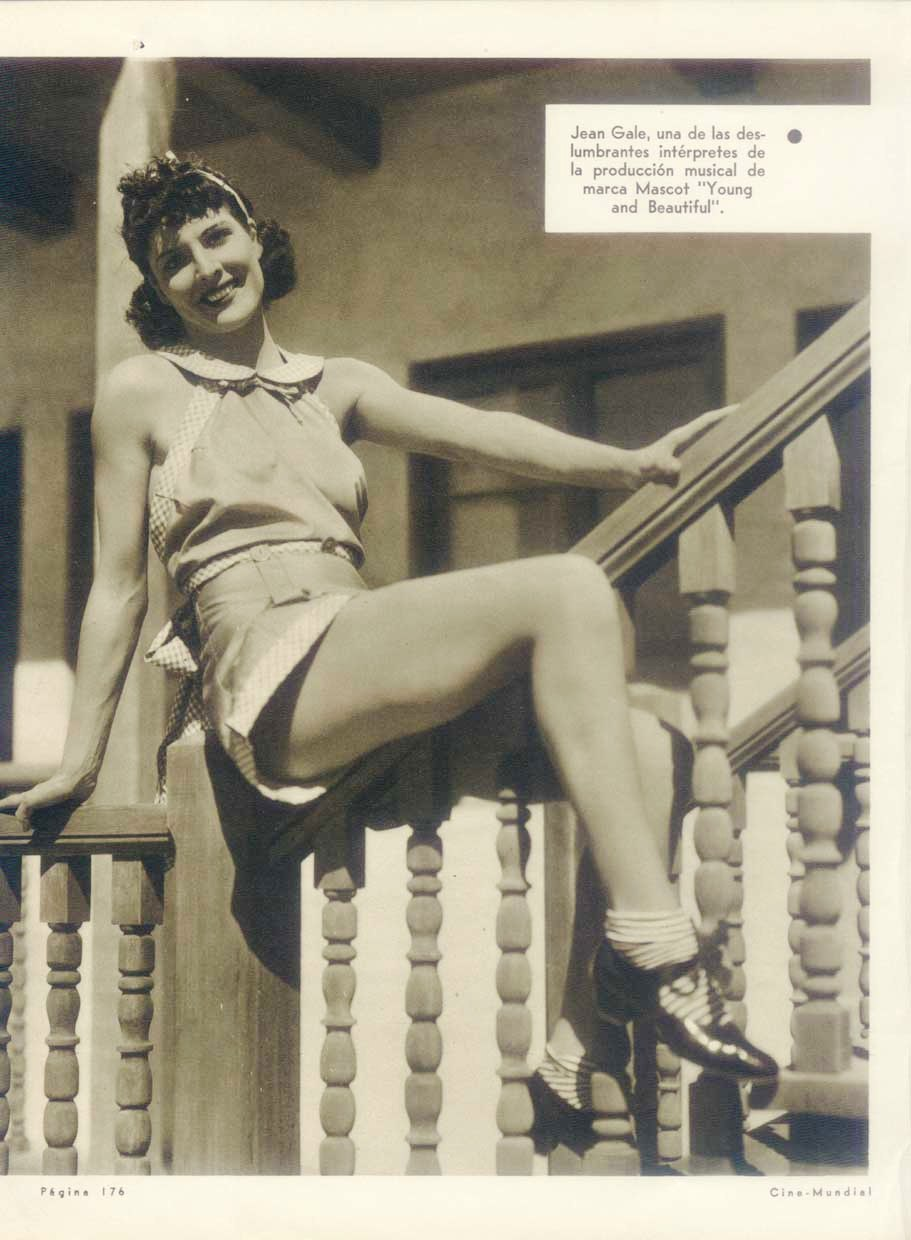
- Jean Gale c. 1935
- Born: Lenore Gilmartin; September 13, 1912; San Francisco, California, U.S.
- Died: September 26, 1974 (aged 62); Los Angeles, California, U.S.
- Occupation: Actress

Jean Gale (September 13, 1912 – September 26, 1974) was an American vaudeville performer who also worked in films during the 1930s.

== Life and career ==
Born in San Francisco, California as Lenore Gilmartin, she had a twin sister, Joan Gale (née Lorraine Gilmartin; born September 13, 1912 – June 11, 1998), along with another set of twin sisters, Jane Gale (née Helen Gilmartin; born July 6, 1911) and June Gale (née Doris Gilmartin; July 6, 1911 – November 13, 1996), although they were not quadruplets, as has occasionally been misreported. They appeared in Vaudeville as the Gale Quadruplets and in George White's Scandals of 1931 and Scandals of 1936. Jean's elder sister June wed Oscar Levant in 1939, to whom she remained married until his death in 1972, and by whom she had three children.

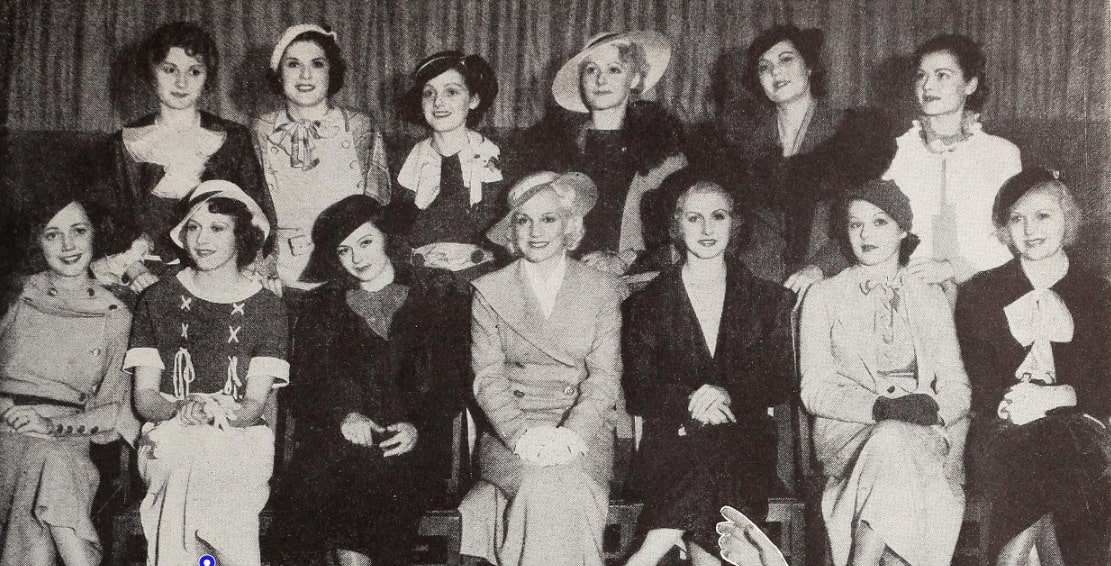
WAMPAS Baby Stars of 1934; Left to right, standing: Judith Arlen, Jean Gale, Ann Hovey, Katherine Williams, Hazel Hayes, Gigi Parrish; seated: Helen Cohan, Jacqueline Wells, Betty Bryson, Jean Carmen, Lu Anne Meredith, Dorothy Drake, Lucille Lund

The sisters began performing in vaudeville at an early age. This brought Jean to the attention of studios, and led to a small role in the film Bottoms Up (1934), starring Spencer Tracy. That same year, she was selected as one of thirteen girls to be "WAMPAS Baby Stars", the last year that WAMPAS made such selections. Although it appeared that Jean's acting career would take off, it never did. She only had four film roles following the baby star moniker: Kiss and Make-Up, Young and Beautiful (both in 1934), a third in A Star Is Born (1937), and the fourth, Girl from Avenue A (1940), all of which were uncredited.

== Later years and death ==
She settled in Los Angeles, where she was residing at the time of her death on September 26, 1974.
