= Bird Millman =

American circus performer, Ziegfeld Girl (1890–1940)

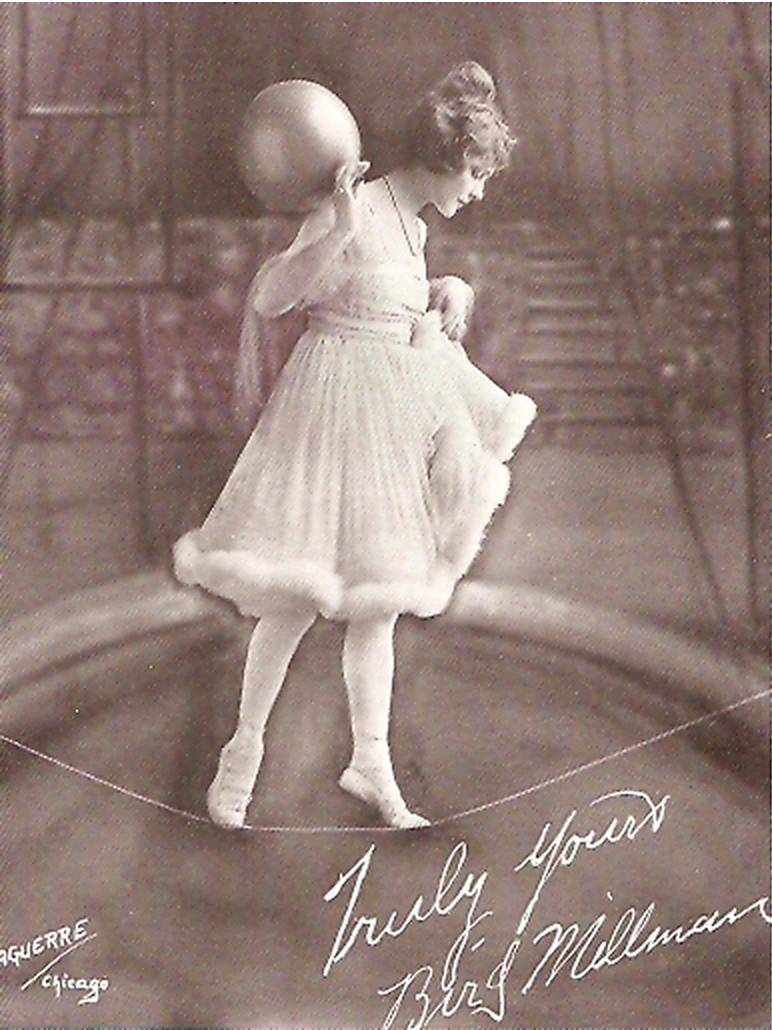
- Millman about 1917
- Born: Jennadean Engleman; October 20, 1890; Cañon City, Colorado, U.S.
- Died: August 5, 1940 (aged 49); Cañon City, Colorado, U.S.
- Occupation: Tightrope walker
- Employer(s): Ringling Brothers and Barnum and Bailey Circus; Florenz Ziegfeld
- Spouse(s): John C. Thomas (divorced); Joseph Francis O'Day (m.?-1929; his death)

Bird Millman O’Day (born Jennadean Engleman; October 20, 1890 – August 5, 1940) was one of the most celebrated high-wire performers of all time. During the “Golden Age of the American Circus,” she was a premiere attraction with the Ringling Brothers and Barnum and Bailey Circus.

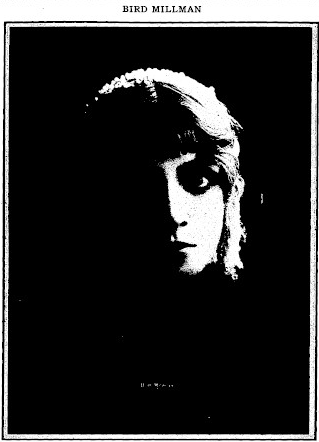
Bird Millman, 1913.

== Mud shows and vaudeville ==
Born Jennadean Engleman in Cañon City, Colorado, young Bird traveled in mud shows (small circuses) with her parents, Dyke F. Engleman and Genevieve Patton Engleman. In 1904, the Millman Trio entered big-time vaudeville, playing such destinations as Keith's Union Square and Hammerstein's Paradise Roof Garden. At one point Bird was dubbed, perhaps ironically, "the Eva Tanguay of the Wire."

At Berlin's Wintergarten Theatre, Bird gave a command performance before the court of Kaiser Wilhelm II. Upon her return to the United States, her act became Bird Millman & Co., adding the New York Hippodrome and the Palace Theatre (Broadway) to her list of credits. One of the troop's new members, Fern Andra, did not return after a brief European tour; later, she resurfaced as a star of German silent film.

== Circus and follies ==
In 1913, Bird became a center-ring performer with the Barnum and Bailey Circus, where she remained after its merger with the Ringling Brothers Circus. In the seasons of 1919 and 1920, the side rings were vacant during Bird's performance; such singularity was reserved for the circus's greatest stars. Bird's peers were equestrienne May Wirth and aerialist Lillian Leitzel, the latter widely considered the greatest circus star of all time. Bird spent the circus's off-season on Broadway, appearing in The Ziegfeld Follies of 1916 and in several editions of Ziegfeld's Frolics.

In 1921, she appeared in John Murray Anderson's Third Annual Greenwich Village Follies. In 1920, she performed a specialty number in The Deep Purple, a silent film directed by Raoul Walsh. Bird never relied on novelty or hair-raising stunts; rather, she was acclaimed for her unusual speed and seemingly effortless grace. Contrary to several well-meaning accounts, she did, indeed, employ a parasol for balance. During several exhibitions, she performed high above the streets of New York City; in addition to selling war bonds at such exhibitions, she gained widespread publicity.

Following her retirement from show business, the cross-dressing Berta Beeson, “the Julian Eltinge of the Wire,” paid homage to her legacy in form and content.

== Personal life ==
Millman's first two marriages were brief: one ending in annulment, the other in quick divorce. Her third husband was Harvard graduate and military veteran, Joseph Francis O'Day, who died shortly after losing his fortune in the stock market crash of 1929.

== Death ==
Destitute, Bird joined her mother and extended family in her native Colorado, where she died of uterine cancer at age 49. Her eulogy was written by author Dixie Willson (sister of composer Meredith Willson).

== Circus Hall of Fame ==
Bird Millman was inducted posthumously into the International Circus Hall of Fame in 1961.

== Fictional ==
She is mentioned briefly in Gwenda Bond's book Girl on a Wire as the main protagonist's idol.

== Resources ==
Items of interest

- Vanity Fair, October 1916 (cover)
- “Why Bewitching Bird Millman ‘Hushed’ Her Goldspoon Marriage,” Denver Post (Magazine Section), 12 October 1924, p. 2
- Willson, Dixie. Little Texas (1929); Mystery in Spangles (1950)

Collections

- The Royal Gorge Regional Museum & History Center in Cañon City, Colorado houses several artifacts, including personal letters and Bird's vaudeville scrapbook.
- The Robert L. Parkinson Library and Research Center at the Circus World Museum houses programs, photographs, and more.
