= Kiss and Make-Up =

1934 film by Harlan Thompson

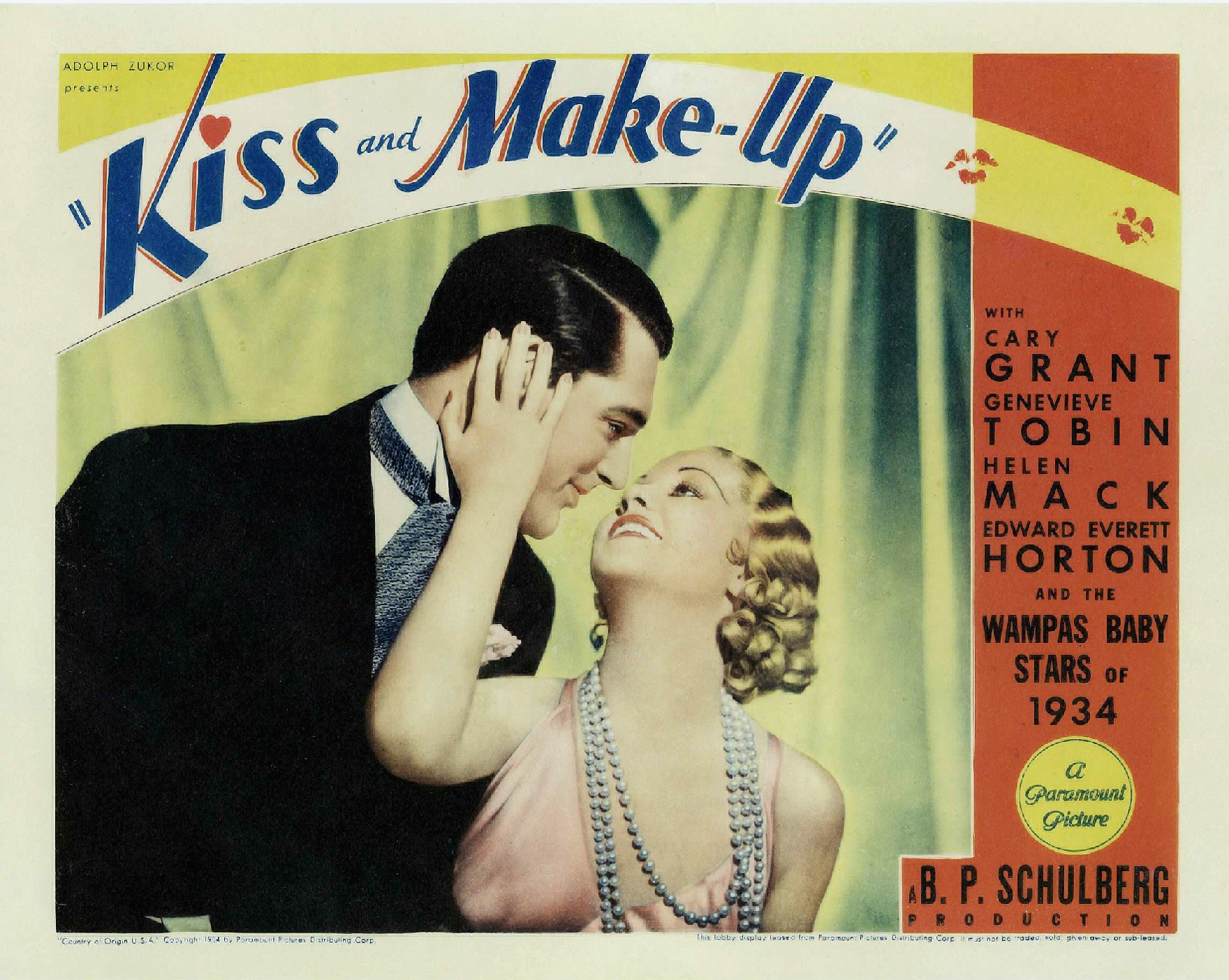
- Lobby card showing Cary Grant and Genevieve Tobin
- Directed by: Harlan Thompson; Jean Negulesco (associate director)
- Written by: Harlan Thompson; George Marion, Jr. Jane Hinton ("adapted by")
- Produced by: B. P. Schulberg
- Starring: Cary Grant; Genevieve Tobin; Helen Mack
- Cinematography: Leon Shamroy
- Music by: Ralph Rainger; Leo Robin (lyrics)
- Production company: Paramount Pictures
- Distributed by: Paramount Pictures
- Release date: July 13, 1934
- Running time: 78 minutes
- Country: United States
- Language: English

Kiss and Make-Up is a 1934 American romantic comedy film directed by Harlan Thompson starring Cary Grant as a doctor who specializes in making women beautiful. Genevieve Tobin and Helen Mack play his romantic entanglements. The film was based on the play Kozmetika by István Békeffy (credited as Stephen Bekeffi). All of the WAMPAS Baby Stars of 1934 were cast in roles in the film.

== Plot ==
Dr. Maurice Lamar runs a highly successful business in Paris providing cosmetic surgery and other beauty treatments to women. Old friend Max Pascal visits him to try to borrow money to finish his research, but Maurice rejects him, instead offering him a job and later a partnership, but Max declines.

Maurice unveils the new Eve Caron and declares her perfect. However, her husband Marcel wants a wife who is just a bit beautiful, not someone who attracts the attention of every man, so he divorces her. Maurice then marries her. They travel to a beauty convention on the Riviera on their honeymoon, accompanied by Maurice's naturally pretty secretary Annie, who secretly yearns for him. However, Eve is so careful about guarding her beauty that all the restrictions that she imposes on herself irritate her new husband. Eve takes so long getting ready that they miss the banquet in his honor.

While swimming, Annie meets an appreciative Marcel Caron. They go on a date, and Annie admires Marcel's curly hair. When Marcel later encounters Maurice at a nightclub, he is delighted when he correctly guesses what Eve has done to Maurice, as he had to endure the same behavior himself.

On the honeymoon night, Eve complains that she has no more cleansing cream and insists that Annie bring her some more. After Annie delivers the cream, she becomes upset and quits, and Maurice cannot understand why. When Maurice sees Eve ready for bed, with cleansing cream on her face and wearing a hairnet and gloves, he takes another hotel room and later seeks a divorce.

Maurice returns to Paris, only to find his business in shambles without Annie to manage things. He decides to quit cosmetics and conduct research with Max. Annie appears and informs Maurice that she is going to marry Marcel. Maurice then realizes that he loves Annie. He chases after the couple in a taxi and they both crash. Annie discovers to her horror that Marcel's curly hair is a toupée. She tells Maurice that she loves him.

== Cast ==
- Cary Grant as Dr. Maurice Lamar
- Genevieve Tobin as Eve Caron
- Helen Mack as Annie
- Edward Everett Horton as Marcel Caron
- Lucien Littlefield as Max Pascal
- Mona Maris as Countess Rita
- Rafael Alcayde as Rolando (credited as Rafael Storm)
- Toby Wing as Consuelo Claghorne
- Dorothy Christie as Greta
- Ann Sheridan as beautician (uncredited)

Listed in the opening credits are the "WAMPAS Baby Stars of 1934":

- Judith Arlen
- Betty Bryson
- Jean Carmen
- Helen Cohan (credited as Helene Cohan)
- Dorothy Drake
- Jean Gale
- Hazel Hayes
- Ann Hovey
- Lucille Lund
- Lu Ann Meredith (as Lu-Anne Meredith)
- Gigi Parrish (as Gi-Gi Parrish)
- Jacqueline Wells
- Katherine Williams

== Reception ==
In a contemporary review for The New York Times, critic Andre Sennwald called the film "a first-class lingerie bazaar and a third-class entertainment" and wrote: "It represents a triumphant attempt to achieve pictorial allure without disturbing its pious editorial point of view on the impersonal worship of feminine beauty. It crowds the screen so thickly with silk, satin and nymphs that it is with some difficulty that such agreeable players as Edward Everett Horton, Cary Grant and Genevieve Tobin succeed in projecting themselves at all. ... 'Kiss and Make-Up' succeeds to a remarkable degree in being dull."

Winthrop Sargent of Variety wrote that Grant and Horton overplayed their parts "too strongly for laughs." Pauline Kael later praised Grant's performance and thought that he had used his skills developed in vaudeville well in the film, displaying a "sense of fun" with "confident, full-hearted exhibitionism."

== See also ==
- National Recovery Administration (NRA), the logo displayed at start of film

== Sources ==
- Deschner, Donald (1973). The Complete Films of Cary Grant. Citadel Press. ISBN 0-8065-0376-9.
- Kael, Pauline (1994). For Keeps. Dutton.
- Wansell, Geoffrey (December 13, 2013) [1996]. Cary Grant, Dark Angel. Skyhorse Publishing. ISBN 978-1-62872-336-6.
