= LeRoy Prinz =

American film director and choreographer

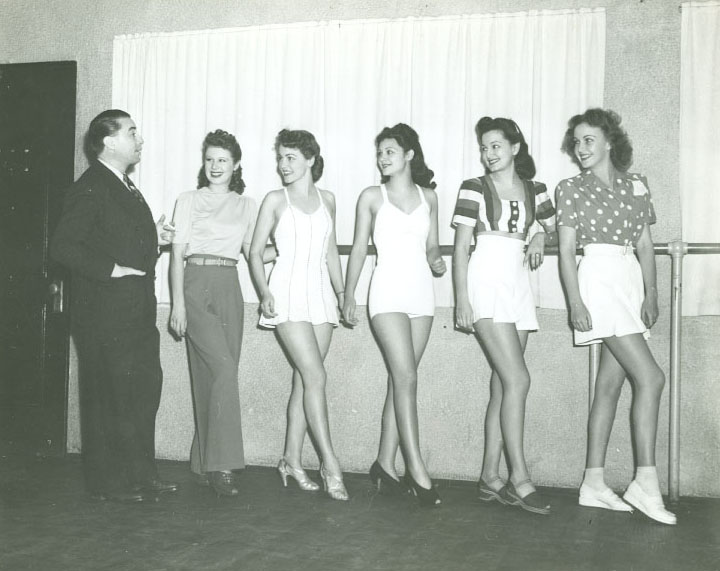
- LeRoy Prinz and dancers at Paramount
- Born: LeRoy Jerome Prinz; July 14, 1895; St. Joseph, Missouri, U.S.
- Died: September 15, 1983 (aged 88); Wadsworth, California, U.S.
- Education: Northwestern University
- Occupations: Choreographer, director
- Years active: 1929–1958
- Spouse(s): Mary E. Thompson (1919-?) Agnes Suzanne Thorstadt (m. 1926; div. 1934) Betty Bryson (m. 1936)

LeRoy Jerome Prinz (July 14, 1895 – September 15, 1983) was an American choreographer, director and producer, who was involved in the production of dozens of motion pictures, mainly for Paramount Pictures and Warner Brothers, from 1929 through 1958, and choreographed Broadway musicals. He was nominated three times for the Academy Award for Best Dance Direction in the 1930s, and won the Golden Globe in 1958.

Among the films whose dances he staged were Show Boat (1936), Yankee Doodle Dandy (1942), Rhapsody in Blue (1945), and South Pacific (1958).

== Early life and military service ==
Leroy Jerome Prinz was born July 14, 1895, in St. Joseph, Missouri to Edward "Egid" Albert and Anna Prinz. His father owned Prinz's Dancing Academy in St. Joseph, Missouri. His father taught more than three generations how to dance and was teaching until his death at 80 years old.

According to one account, Leroy was sent to reform school after chasing his stepmother with a carving knife.In newspaper profiles, he claimed that after running away from boarding school at the age of 15, he "hopped a freight" and came to New York City, where, in 1911, he began a blackface song and dance act, named Prinz and Buck, with a young black man he met along the way. Later that year, he told interviewers, he went on a ship to Europe as a cabin boy, jumped ship, and traveled around Europe "introducing the American strut step" in return for meals and lodging. In Marseilles, he joined the French Foreign Legion, serving as a bugler in Algiers. He also represented a rubber company in St. Louis and Kansas City.

After the outbreak of World War I, he returned to France, trained as a pilot, and served in the French aviation corps and Captain Eddie Rickenbacker's 94th Aero Squadron. He was with the 94th from November 1917 to June 1918, when he switched to the 27th Aero Squadron, where he stayed until November 1918. At the 27th, his duties included working at the Aircraft Acceptance Park test facility at Orly, France. Prinz subsequently told journalists that he crashed 14 to 18 airplanes, was nicknamed "America's German Ace" as a result, (he was also called "Crash Ace Prinz) and that he was wounded in the war and carried a silver plate in his head from his last plane crash. In an October 1918 article, war correspondent George Seldes described how Prinz was separated from his flight on his first venture into German territory, and returned home with minor injuries after a perilous journey.

== Career ==
According to his obituary in the Los Angeles Times, Prinz returned to the U.S. in 1919 and studied theater at Northwestern University. After graduation from Northwestern, the newspaper reported, Prinz returned to France and worked as a choreographer for the Folies Bergère in Paris.

A November 1919 report in St. Louis Post-Dispatch states that Prinz was employed in the aeronautical portion of an American Legion show, also featuring actor William S. Hart, that was touring the area. The newspaper gives Prinz's rank as captain and states that he was a flight partner of Quentin Roosevelt. A Wisconsin newspaper reported in 1921 that Prinz, which it said had "danced with Al Jolson," was teaching dance at a vacation camp for wounded veterans. The newspaper wrote that Prinz had "fallen 3000 feet" but had recovered.

In various newspaper profiles, Prinz claimed that he worked as a dancer at a bordello in Omaha, as an aviation instructor for the Mexican government, and that he ferried ammunition for the Nicaraguan rebel leader, Augusto César Sandino. He told interviewers that he worked for gangster Jim Colosimo's restaurant in Chicago, and that he produced stage shows for Al Capone. He claimed in a 1945 New York Times profile that Capone hired him to book entertainment and stage floor shows at 18 Chicago nightclubs. Prinz left Chicago and worked as a dance director in New York, Florida, Mexico and Cuba. His employers included Earl Carroll, Broadway's Shubert family, Tex Guinan and Philadelphia bootlegger Boo Hoo Hoff. He choreographed Earl Carroll's Vanities of 1930 and other Broadway shows between 1929 and 1933.

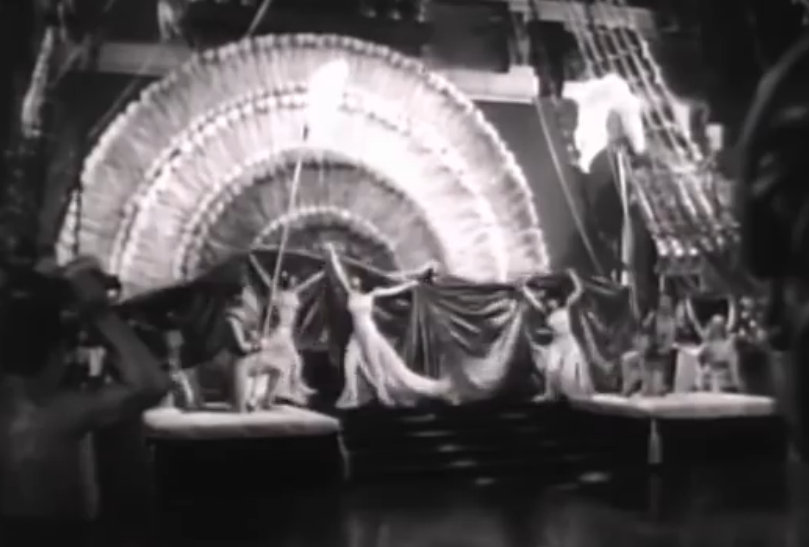
Prinz clashed with Agnes de Mille while staging dances for her uncle's film Cleopatra (1934).

His first employment in films was in 1931 by director Cecil B. DeMille, who employed him as dance director. While filming Cleopatra (1934), Prinz clashed with DeMille's niece Agnes de Mille, who was brought in to choreograph dance sequences. According to Agnes de Mille's biographer, her uncle always deferred to the "reliable but pedestrian" Prinz, even after agreeing to his niece's flamboyant dances in advance. Agnes de Mille left the film.

Prinz directed dance sequences for dozens of Paramount Pictures movies between 1933 and 1941, when he became dance director of Warner Brothers, where he staged all of Warner's musical sequences for the next 16 years. He worked on over 150 films, mainly as a choreographer, including The Desert Song (1929), Tea for Two (1950), and The Jazz Singer (1952), a remake of the first sound movie.

In the 1940s, he worked on Road to Singapore (1940) at Paramount. His first major assignment at Warner Brothers was the George M. Cohan biographical movie Yankee Doodle Dandy (1942), starring James Cagney in the title role. He choreographed a "ballet in jive" sequence in the service musical Hollywood Canteen (1944), featuring Broadway dancer Joan McCracken. Prinz played himself directing the sequence in a brief cameo.

McCracken, who came to Hollywood after winning acclaim in the 1943 production of Oklahoma!, was discouraged by her experiences filming the Hollywood Canteen number and did not like working with Prinz. As a choreographer he made no effort to integrate his dances into specific stories, or to choreograph specific dance steps. This caused deep disillusionment for McCracken, whose Oklahoma! dances were choreographed by Agnes de Mille, because Prinz was not able to support or advance McCracken's artistic development. However, he gave her latitude to incorporate ballet in her dance routine, and Prinz did not object to her ideas.

Prinz worked again with James Cagney, eight years after Yankee Doodle Dandy, on West Point Story, also starring Virginia Mayo and Doris Day. He ceased working in films after choreographing the Boar's Tooth Ceremonial dance sequence in the film adaptation of South Pacific (1958).

Later in life, he was owner of his own production company, vice president of an advertising agency, and a producer of benefit programs in Hollywood. He counted among his friends Ronald Reagan, whom he knew from their days working together at Warner Brothers, and he choreographed entertainment at the 1976 Republican National Convention and at several presidential inaugurations. Reagan called him from the White House when Prinz was in the hospital shortly before he died. At the 1976 convention, he came up with the idea of playing "The Star-Spangled Banner" when convention organizers wanted to silence unruly delegates.

Prinz was a "notorious self-promoter", and told stories about himself that were sometimes dubious. Columnist Michael Coakley recounted in a late-life profile of Prinz that editors of The Saturday Evening Post once were able to verify 90% of what they were told by Prinz, who sent them a telegraph stating "That's great. Don't believe 50 percent of it myself." In a Los Angeles Times profile late in life, Prinz' claimed "at least partial credit" in popularizing the Charleston and rumba, which became popular after appearing in his movies.

== Awards ==
Prinz was nominated in the long-defunct category of Best Dance Direction during the 1937 Academy Awards for Waikiki Wedding, and was twice nominated in this category for the 1935 films All the King's Horses and The Big Broadcast of 1936. He was awarded the Golden Globe for best film choreography in 1958.

Though known mainly for his work as a dance director on big-budget musicals, he directed a number of mainly short films, one of which, A Boy and His Dog (1946), won the Academy Award for Best Live Action Short Film.

== Choreographic style and legacy ==
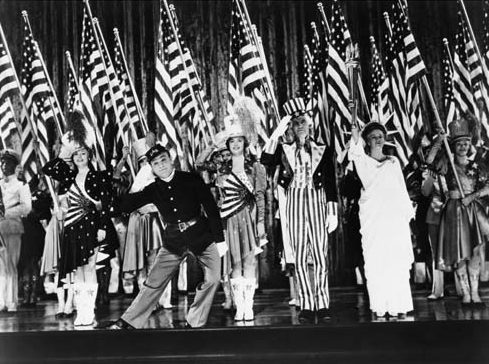
In Prinz's choreography of films like Yankee Doodle Dandy, the camera was like a member of the audience.

A New York Times profile wrote that "his life story reads more like the script of an Errol Flynn adventure", though the stories he told about himself were often dubious. He was once described as "a feisty little man who always had a cigarette dangling from his lips and looked more like a bartender than a choreographer."

Prinz was an "idea man" rather than a choreographer, creating lavish production numbers by using simple steps and dance routines. Jazz dance choreographer Jack Cole has said that Prinz "didn't know a bloody thing about dancing." In a 1952 profile, Associated Press Hollywood columnist James Bacon stated that Prinz differed from what he described as "sissified" choreographers, that he was "a rough, tough guy, as some little giants of 5 foot 5 are. His language is colorful." He claimed never to have taken a lesson in his life, and in a reference to his family's dancing school, that he was a "victim of heredity."

As a choreographer at Warner Brothers, Prinz had a different approach from Busby Berkeley, whose choreography for early 1930s movies included elaborate production numbers that were photographed using imaginative camera angles, often from above. Berkeley's numbers "broke the boundaries of the stage," and Prinz took a completely opposite approach, reinforcing the perspective of a stage performance that the audience could not forget. Prinz's style is evident in the Little Johnny Jones number in Yankee Doodle Dandy, which featured a stationary camera and included features of the stage, such as the orchestra pit, in the dance number. The camera, in effect, became a member of the audience.

In his 1983 study of wartime Hollywood musicals, Allen L. Woll says that with the camera angles not being employed effectively, as they were by Berkeley, "the pedestrian quality of Prinz's dance numbers is painfully revealed. No matter the picture, no matter the director, Prinz's dances are invariably the same, static and stage-bound."

His treatment of dancers was sometimes caustic. Choreographer Hermes Pan recalled in 1972 interview that Prinz "would make some girls hysterical. He loved to have them in tears. And that seemed to be the thing, to swear at the girls and be nasty."

== Personal life ==
Prinz was married three times, to Mary E. Thompson in 1919, Agnes Suzanne Thorstadt (1926-1934), and actress Betty Bryson. Prinz eloped to Yuma, Arizona with Bryson on June 21, 1936, and remained married to her until his death in 1983 Bryson was the niece by marriage of actor Warner Baxter. She was put under contract to Fox and had a part in her uncle's film, Grand Canary.

He had a daughter, Dolores Lee Prinz and had a son, LeRoy Prinz, Jr.

== Selected credits ==
- Bolero (1934)
- Cleopatra (1934)
- The Big Broadcast of 1936 (1935)
- Anything Goes (1936)
- Show Boat (1936)
- The Big Broadcast of 1937 (1936)
- Artists & Models (1937)
- St. Louis Blues (1939)
- Road to Singapore (1940)
- Buck Benny Rides Again (1940)
- Too Many Girls (1940)
- Fiesta (1941)
- Yankee Doodle Dandy (1942)
- Mission to Moscow (1943)
- This is the Army (1943)
- Thank Your Lucky Stars (1943)
- Hollywood Canteen (1944)
- Rhapsody in Blue (1945)
- Night and Day (1946)
- Escape Me Never (1947)
- The West Point Story (1950)
- The Ten Commandments (1956)
- Sayonara (1957)
- South Pacific (1958)
