= George White's 1935 Scandals =

1935 American musical film

- 1935 Theatrical Poster
- Directed by: George White; Harry Lachman (uncredited)
- Written by: George White (Concept)
- Screenplay by: Patterson McNutt; Jack Yellen
- Story by: David Freedman; Sam Hellman; Gladys Lehman
- Produced by: Winfield R. Sheehan (Uncredited); George White
- Starring: Alice Faye; James Dunn; Cliff Edwards
- Cinematography: George Schneiderman
- Edited by: Robert Bischoff (Uncredited)
- Music by: Hugo Friedhofer (Uncredited)
- Distributed by: Fox Film Corporation
- Release date: March 29, 1935
- Running time: 84 minutes
- Country: United States
- Language: English

George White's 1935 Scandals is an American musical film, written by Jack Yellen, directed by George White and Harry Lachman, and produced in 1935 by Fox Film Corporation. It was a follow-up to (but not a sequel to) the 1934 release, George White's Scandals.

== Plot ==
The film centers on real-life stage and screen producer George White as he gathers acts for his new Broadway revue. At the top of his list is blonde Alice Faye. Also appearing in the film was James Dunn and Cliff Edwards.

George White's 1935 Scandals is best remembered as the major film debut of a young dancer named Eleanor Powell, here performing a "specialty dance". Powell, already a Broadway star, had played bit parts in a couple of films prior to this, but Scandals was her first major film role. According to her introduction to the book Gotta Sing, Gotta Dance, a mix-up in the make-up department resulted in her being made to look almost Egyptian and she left the production so disenchanted with movie-making, she initially rejected a contract offer by MGM that later in the year placed her in the popular Broadway Melody of 1936.

Reportedly, Bill "Bojangles" Robinson filmed a dance routine for this film, but it was cut. Actress Jane Wyman appeared in the film as an uncredited chorine.

== Cast ==
- Alice Faye as Honey Walters
- James Dunn as Eddy Taylor
- Cliff Edwards as Dude Holloway
- Eleanor Powell as Marilyn Collins
- Emma Dunn as Aunt Jane Hopkins
- Arline Judge as Midge Malone
- Ned Sparks as Elmer White
- George White as George White
- The Scandals Beauties as George White's Scandals Beauties
- June Lang as Chorine (uncredited)
