= Flying High (1931 film) =

1931 film

- Sheet music cover
- Directed by: Charles Reisner
- Written by: A. P. Younger (screenplay and dialogue); Charles F. Riesner (adaptation); Robert E. Hopkins (additional dialogue)
- Based on: Flying High; 1930 musical by B. G. DeSylva (book); Lew Brown (lyrics); Ray Henderson and John McGowan (music)
- Produced by: George White
- Starring: Bert Lahr; Charlotte Greenwood; Pat O'Brien
- Cinematography: Merritt B. Gerstad
- Edited by: William S. Gray
- Music by: Songs: B. G. DeSylva and Lew Brown (lyrics); Ray Henderson (music); Additional songs: Dorothy Fields (lyrics); Jimmy McHugh (music)
- Production company: Metro-Goldwyn-Mayer
- Distributed by: Metro-Goldwyn-Mayer Distributing Corp.
- Release date: November 14, 1931
- Running time: 78 or 80 minutes
- Country: United States
- Language: English
- Budget: $634,000
- Box office: $657,000

Flying High (also known as George White's Flying High and Happy Landing, the title it was released under in the UK) is a 1931 American pre-Code musical film released by Metro-Goldwyn-Mayer, produced by George White, and directed by Charles F. Reisner. The film stars Bert Lahr, in his first film role, Charlotte Greenwood, and Pat O'Brien, and features Charles Winninger, Hedda Hopper, and Guy Kibbee, with Gus Arnheim and his orchestra.

Flying High is based on the Broadway show of the same name, and has song lyrics by B. G. DeSylva and Lew Brown, and music by Ray Henderson. Additional songs for the film were by Dorothy Fields (lyrics) and Jimmy McHugh (music). The choreography for the musical numbers – which were originally in Technicolor, but which only survive in black and white – is by Busby Berkeley

== Plot ==
Waitress Pansy Botts (Charlotte Greenwood) places an ad in the Pilot's Gazette for a husband, offering a $500 reward, but is unsuccessful. At the nearby airfield, inventor Rusty Krouse (Bert Lahr) has built the "Aerocopter", intending to enter it in the upcoming 10th Annual Air Show. With finances depleted, Rusty looks to Sport Wardell (Pat O'Brien) for help in finding a wealthy investor. Soon, Fred Smith (Guy Kibbee) and his daughter Eileen (Kathryn Crawford) show some interest in the Aerocopter, but have no ready cash.

Rusty is worried that his partner will go to jail after accepting a check from Mr. Smith. Sport convinces him to marry Pansy and use her $500 dowry to salvage the company's future. Sport convinces Pansy that she is marrying the man in the picture (Clark Gable) he shows her. Nevertheless, she is instantly attracted to Rusty.

The deal with the Smiths falls through when both Smith and Sport are arrested for shady dealing. Sport tells his new love, Eileen, that he has to find bail money and the only way is for Rusty to fly his invention at the air show and win the prize money. In order to qualify as a pilot, Rusty ends up being examined by Doctor Brown (Charles Winninger), who thinks he is mad. Pansy chases after the reluctant groom, who has gotten cold feet, and finally traps him.

During the air show, both Pansy and Rusty end up at the airport and in the Aerocopter. After taking off clumsily, crashing through the roof of a hangar, once in the air, Rusty tells Pansy that an important part is out on the wing and they need it to land. Pansy climbs onto the wing, but has to parachute to safety. Rusty keeps flying higher, reaching a height of 53,000 feet before he releases fuel and eventually descends, passing Pansy on her way down. He crash-lands heavily at the airfield, emerging from the wreckage to find he has been awarded first prize. With the prize money saving the company, all the couples then happily reunite.

== Cast ==
- Bert Lahr as Emil "Rusty" Krouse
- Charlotte Greenwood as Pansy Potts
- Pat O'Brien as "Sport" Wardell
- Kathryn Crawford as Miss Eileen Smith
- Charles Winninger as Dr. Brown
- Hedda Hopper as Mrs. Smith
- Guy Kibbee as Mr. Fred Smith
- Herbert Braggiotti as Gordon
- Gus Arnheim and His Orchestra as themselves
- actor not credited as Mr. Rankin

== Production ==
In 1927, Bert Lahr left burlesque to star in musical comedies on Broadway. After playing to packed houses, his reputation as a gifted comic led him to films. When the "talkies" came in, MGM brought producer George White's stage hit Flying High (1931) to the screen, giving Lahr his first film role, reprising his Broadway turn. In a letter to the Hays Office, MGM claimed to have paid $100,000 to buy the show.

John Gilbert was originally slated to appear in the film, presumably in the role played by Pat O'Brien. Martin Broones was to have adapted and supervised the film.

Production took place from mid-August to late September 1931.

A number of flying scenes were set at the Oakland Airport.

A scene in the film, the "examination scene" in which Lahr pours liquor into a test tube, was objected to by the Hays Office, which also objected to some "vulgarities" in the script, but apparently did not object to a scene where the women of the chorus stripped down to bras and slips to be examined by a doctor. MGM held firm and released the film with the objected to scene intact, but after some legal trouble in Portland, Oregon, decided to remove the scene from all copies of the film.

== Musical numbers ==
Although 6 or 8 songs were reported to be in preparation for the film, three actually appeared in the movie. Only one of those ("Happy Landing") came from the Broadway show.

- "(I’ll Make a) Happy Landing" by Brown, DeSylva and Henderson (originally In Technicolor) - sung by Kathryn Crawford and chorus, reprised at the end of the film by the chorus
- "It’ll Be the First Time for Me" by McHugh and Fields - sung by Charlotte Greenwood and Bert Lahr
- "We’ll Dance Until the Dawn" by McHugh and Fields (originally In Technicolor) - sung by Kathryn Crawford and chorus

The film's musical numbers feature some of choreographer Busby Berkeley's earliest film work. Forty women and sixteen men comprised the chorus which danced in the two musical numbers created by Berkeley. The Technicolor versions of those sequences are now lost.

The musical numbers "Happy Landing" and "Dance Until Dawn" were re-used in the MGM short Plane Nuts (1933) with Ted Healy and the Three Stooges.

== Reception ==
=== Critical response ===
Flying High was received well by critics. In his review for The New York Times, Mourdant Hall commented: "Bert Lahr has a busy time in the diverting pictorial translation of the musical comedy, 'Flying High' ... Here there is comedy, a few songs and some excellent groupings of dancing girls. The general effect proved highly successful in provoking interest and laughter..." The supporting cast also drew raves, particularly "long-legged" Charlotte Greenwood, "who delivers her usual riotous brand of fun."

=== Box office ===
Flying High grossed a total (domestic and foreign) of $657,000: $476,000 from the US and Canada and $181,000 elsewhere resulting in a loss of $273,000.

== TV adaptation ==
Lahr reprised his role for the NBC TV program Musical Comedy Time on March 19, 1951.

== See also ==
- Flying High (musical), the stage musical version
