= Betty Arlen =

American actress (1909–1966)

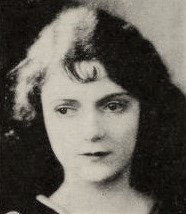
- Born: November 4, 1909; Kentucky, U.S.
- Died: August 4, 1966 (aged 56); Farmington, New Mexico
- Occupation: Actress
- Spouse: Louis Golden (divorced 1932)

Betty Arlen (November 4, 1909 – August 4, 1966) was an American actress and dancer best known for her being selected as a WAMPAS Baby Star in 1925.

== Biography ==
Arlen was born on November 9, 1904, in Providence, Kentucky. She moved to Hollywood in 1925, having been spotted by talent scouts while working as a stage dancer. At only 16 years of age, she was selected as one of thirteen girls that year to be WAMPAS Baby Stars. Being selected as a "WAMPAS Baby Star" would be the highlight of her brief acting career.

In 1926 she had a supporting role in A Punch in the Nose, which was her only credited role. She would have two uncredited roles in 1928, and received only bit parts afterward, but struggled to stay in the business for some time.

She was married to theater manager, Louis Golden, but filed for divorce in 1932.

Arlen remained in the Los Angeles area. She died on August 4, 1966, in Farmington, New Mexico.

== Filmography ==
- A Punch in the Nose (1926)
- Love at First Flight (Uncredited, 1928)
- The Chicken (Uncredited, 1928)
- I'll See You in My Dreams (Uncredited, 1951)
- April in Paris (Uncredited, 1952)
- It's Always Fair Weather (Uncredited, 1955)
