= Fighting Through (1934 film) =

1934 film

- Directed by: Harry L. Fraser
- Written by: Oliver Drake; Harry L. Fraser
- Produced by: Willis Kent
- Starring: Reb Russell; Lucille Lund; Yakima Canutt
- Cinematography: James Diamond
- Edited by: S. Roy Luby
- Production company: Willis Kent Productions
- Distributed by: Majestic Pictures
- Release date: August 29, 1934
- Running time: 55 minutes
- Country: United States
- Language: English

Fighting Through is a 1934 American Western film directed by Harry L. Fraser and starring Reb Russell, Lucille Lund and Yakima Canutt.

== Cast ==
- Reb Russell as Reb Russell
- Lucille Lund as Lucille Lund
- Yakima Canutt as Big Jack Thorne
- Edward Hearn as Lennie Lenihan
- Chester Gan as Wong
- Steve Clemente as Steve - the Knife Thrower
- Bill Patton as Bill - Henchman
- Frank McCarroll as Bull - Henchman
- Ben Corbett as Benny - Henchman
- Hank Bell as Hank - Henchman
- Slim Whitaker as Sheriff Slade
- Jack Jones as Singing Deputy
- Jack Kirk as Jack - Singing Deputy
- Chuck Baldra as Guitar-Playing Deputy
- Nelson McDowell as Parson - Henchman
- Victor Adamson as Henchman
- Hal Taliaferro as Frisco

== Bibliography ==
- Michael R. Pitts. Poverty Row Studios, 1929–1940: An Illustrated History of 55 Independent Film Companies, with a Filmography for Each. McFarland & Company, 2005.
