= Young and Beautiful (film) =

1934 film by Joseph Santley

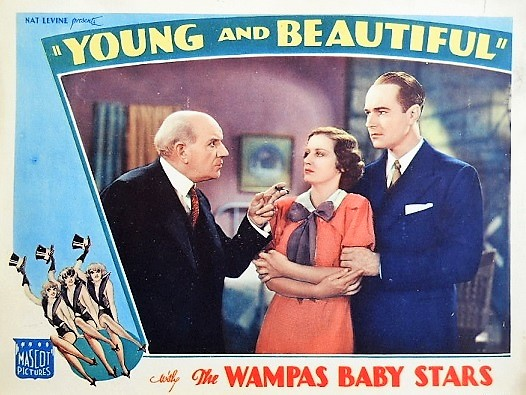
- Theatrical release poster
- Directed by: Joseph Santley
- Written by: Joseph Santley (adaptation); Milton Crims (adaptation); Dore Schary (dialogue); Colbert Clark (add. dialogue); Al Martin (add. dialogue)
- Screenplay by: Dore Schary
- Story by: Joseph Santley; Milton Crims
- Produced by: Nat Levine
- Starring: William Haines; Judith Allen; Joseph Cawthorn
- Music by: Arthur Kay (uncredited)
- Production company: Mascot Pictures
- Release date: September 17, 1934
- Running time: 63 or 68 minutes
- Country: United States
- Language: English

Young and Beautiful is a 1934 American romantic comedy film directed by Joseph Santley and starring William Haines and Judith Allen. The screenplay concerns a press agent who goes to great lengths to make his actress girlfriend a star, only to risk losing her in the process.

== Plot ==
In Hollywood, press agent Robert Preston gets into trouble with his boss, Herman Cline, head of Superba Pictures, for neglecting his duties in order to publicize the 13 WAMPAS Baby Stars, June Dale in particular, at a banquet in their honor. However, he sweet talks Mrs. Cline and keeps his job. June shows up and faints, shaken by a failed abduction attempt. It turns out to be a publicity stunt concocted by Preston for his fiancée.

== Cast ==
- William Haines as Robert Preston
- Judith Allen as June Dale
- Joseph Cawthorn as Herman Cline
- John Miljan as Gordon Douglas
- Ted Fio Rito as himself
- Al Shaw as Piano Mover (as Shaw and Lee)
- Sam Lee as Piano Mover (as Shaw and Lee)
- James Bush as Dick
- Vince Barnett as Sammy (as Vincent Barnett)
- Warren Hymer as The Champion
- Franklin Pangborn as Radio announcer
- James P. Burtis as Farrell
- Syd Saylor as Hansen
- Greta Meyer as Mrs. Cline
- Fred Kelsey as Hennessy
- Andre Beranger as Henry Briand
- Ray Mayer as Songwriter

The Wampus Baby Stars:

- Judith Arlen
- Betty Bryson
- Jean Carmen
- Dorothy Drake
- Jean Gale
- Hazel Hayes
- Ann Hovey
- Neoma Judge
- Lucille Lund
- Lu Anne Meredith
- Katherine Williams
