= WAMPAS Baby Stars =

Western Association of Motion Picture Advertisers promotion

The "WAMPAS Baby Stars" of 1932. Rear row: Toshia Mori, Boots Mallory, Ruth Hall, Gloria Stuart, Patricia Ellis, Ginger Rogers, Lilian Bond, Evalyn Knapp, Marian Shockley. Front row: Dorothy Wilson, Mary Carlisle, Lona Andre, Eleanor Holm, Dorothy Layton (June Clyde is not pictured).

The WAMPAS Baby Stars was a promotional campaign sponsored by the United States Western Association of Motion Picture Advertisers, which honored 13 (15 in 1932) young actresses each year whom they believed to be on the threshold of movie stardom. The campaign ran from 1922 to 1934, except for 1930 and 1933.

Most failed to live up to their promotion; a small number of the selections went on to become major movie stars: Colleen Moore (1922), Jobyna Ralston (1923), Clara Bow (1924), Janet Gaynor (1926), Fay Wray (1926), Dolores del Rio (1926), Dolores Costello (1926), Mary Astor (1926), Joan Crawford (1926), Lupe Vélez (1928), Loretta Young (1929), Jean Arthur (1929), Joan Blondell (1931) and Ginger Rogers (1932). Gaynor, Astor, Crawford, Young and Rogers all were awarded the Academy Award for Best Actress during their careers, with Gaynor receiving the first one during the first year of the award's existence.

Clara Bow was a Silent era star known as The It Girl. She was Hollywood's greatest female draw at her peak and her final film was in 1933. Bow was also in the first movie to receive the Academy Award for Outstanding Picture, Wings, in 1929. Arthur and Blondell had long and fruitful careers in Hollywood, the former as a lead actress, the latter usually in supporting roles after the Pre-Code era.

Others with significant Hollywood careers included Evelyn Brent (1923), Joyce Compton (1926), Constance Cummings (1931, who decamped to England), Frances Dee (1931), and Gloria Stuart (1932, whose career revived in the 1990s when she received an Oscar nomination as Best Supporting Actress for her role in Titanic).

== Overview ==
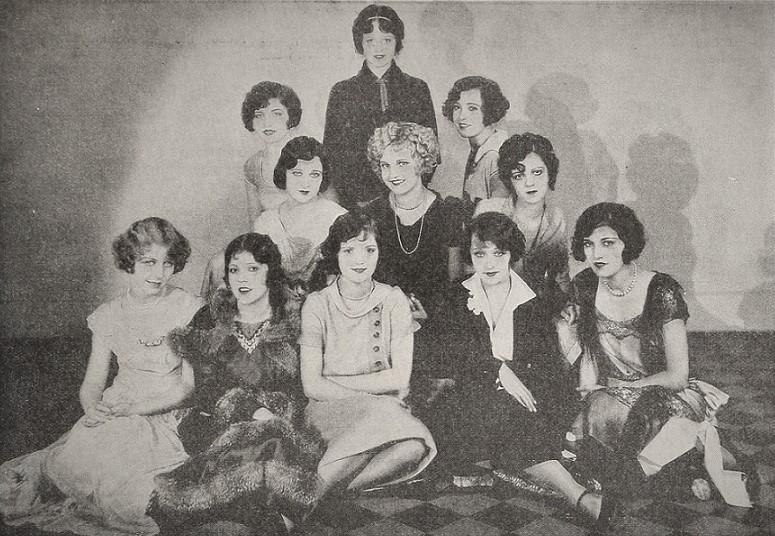
WAMPAS Baby Stars of 1925.

1922—1935

The WAMPAS Baby Stars campaign began in 1922. Every year, publicists chose a group of young actresses who were under contract at major studios that they felt were on the threshold of stardom. Awardees were honored at a party called the "WAMPAS Frolic" and were given extensive media coverage. The awards were not given in 1930 and 1933 due to objections from independent film studios. When the campaign was revived in 1934, freelance actresses, along with studio contract players, were included as the chosen "Baby Stars". The campaign was discarded in 1935, after which the Western Association of Motion Picture Advertisers disbanded.

1956

In 1956, a group of veteran stars, among them 1932 WAMPAS Baby Star Ginger Rogers, chose a group of young actresses supposed to be known as The Wampas Baby Stars of 1956. The Western Association of Motion Picture Advertisers no longer existed so the idea fizzled. The selection took place nevertheless;15 "babies" were chosen: Phyllis Applegate, Roxanne Arlen, Jolene Brand, Donna Cooke, Barbara Huffman (later known as Barbara Eden), Jewell Lain, Barbara Marks, Lita Milan, Norma Nilsson, Ina Poindexter, Violet Rensin, Dawn Richard, and Delfin Thursday.

Last

The last surviving original WAMPAS Baby Star, Mary Carlisle, died at the age of 104 on August 1, 2018.

== List ==
Key
‡	Denotes actress born outside the United States

=== 1922 ===
Actress	Lifespan	Birthplace	Image	Ref.
Marion Aye	1903–1951	Chicago, Illinois, U.S.		
Helen Ferguson	1901–1977	Decatur, Illinois, U.S.		
Lila Lee	1905–1973	Union Hill, New Jersey, U.S.		
Jacqueline Logan	1904–1983	Corsicana, Texas, U.S.		
Louise Lorraine	1904–1981	San Francisco, California, U.S.		
Bessie Love	1898–1986	Midland, Texas, U.S.		
Kathryn McGuire	1903–1978	Peoria, Illinois, U.S.		
Patsy Ruth Miller	1904–1995	St. Louis, Missouri, U.S.		
Colleen Moore	1899–1988	Port Huron, Michigan, U.S.		
Mary Philbin	1902–1993	Chicago, Illinois, U.S.		
Pauline Starke	1901–1977	Joplin, Missouri, U.S.		
Lois Wilson	1894–1988	Pittsburgh, Pennsylvania, U.S.		
Claire Windsor	1892–1972	Marvin, Kansas, U.S.		

=== 1923 ===
Actress	Lifespan	Birthplace	Image	Ref.
Eleanor Boardman	1898–1991	Philadelphia, Pennsylvania, U.S.		
Evelyn Brent	1895–1975	Tampa, Florida, U.S.		
Dorothy Devore	1899–1976	Fort Worth, Texas, U.S.		
Virginia Brown Faire	1904–1980	Brooklyn, New York City, U.S.		
Betty Francisco	1900–1950	Little Rock, Arkansas, U.S.		
Pauline Garon	1900–1965	Montreal, Quebec, Canada		
Kathleen Key	1903–1954	Buffalo, New York, U.S.		
Laura La Plante	1904–1996	St. Louis, Missouri, U.S.		
Margaret Leahy ‡	1902–1967	London, England, U.K.		
Helen Lynch	1900–1965	Billings, Montana, U.S.		
Derelys Perdue	1902–1989	Los Angeles, California, U.S.		
Jobyna Ralston	1899–1967	South Pittsburg, Tennessee, U.S.		
Ethel Shannon	1898–1951	Denver, Colorado, U.S.		

=== 1924 ===
Actress	Lifespan	Birthplace	Image	Ref.
Clara Bow	1905–1965	Brooklyn, New York City, U.S.		
Elinor Fair	1903–1957	Richmond, Virginia, U.S.		
Carmelita Geraghty	1901–1966	Rushville, Indiana, U.S.		
Gloria Grey	1909–1947	Portland, Oregon, U.S.		
Ruth Hiatt	1906–1994	Cripple Creek, Colorado, U.S.		
Julanne Johnston	1900–1988	Indianapolis, Indiana, U.S.		
Hazel Keener	1904–1979	Fairbury, Illinois, U.S.		
Dorothy Mackaill	1903–1990	Kingston upon Hull, England, U.K.		
Blanche Mehaffey	1908–1968	Cincinnati, Ohio, U.S.		
Margaret Morris	1898–1968	Minneapolis, Minnesota, U.S.		
Marian Nixon	1904–1983	Superior, Wisconsin, U.S.		
Lucille Ricksen	1910–1925	Chicago, Illinois, U.S.		
Alberta Vaughn	1904–1992	Ashland, Kentucky, U.S.		

=== 1925 ===
Actress	Lifespan	Birthplace	Image	Ref.
Betty Arlen	1909–1966	Providence, Kentucky, U.S.		
Olive Borden	1906–1947	Richmond, Virginia, U.S.		
Anne Cornwall	1897–1980	Brooklyn, New York City, U.S.		
Ena Gregory ‡	1906–1993	Sydney, New South Wales, Australia		
Madeline Hurlock	1897–1989	Federalsburg, Maryland, U.S.		
Natalie Joyce	1902–1992	Norfolk, Virginia, U.S.		
Violet La Plante	1908–1984	St. Louis, Missouri, U.S.		
June Marlowe	1903–1984	St. Cloud, Minnesota, U.S.		
Joan Meredith	1907–1980	Hot Springs, Arkansas, U.S.		
Evelyn Peirce	1908–1960	Del Rio, Texas, U.S.		
Dorothy Revier	1904–1993	San Francisco, California, U.S.		
Duane Thompson	1903–1970	Red Oak, Iowa, U.S.		
Lola Todd	1904–1995	New York City, U.S.		

=== 1926 ===
Actress	Lifespan	Birthplace	Image	Ref.
Mary Astor	1906–1987	Quincy, Illinois, U.S.		
Mary Brian	1906–2002	Corsicana, Texas, U.S.		
Joyce Compton	1907–1997	Lexington, Kentucky, U.S.		
Dolores Costello	1903–1979	Pittsburgh, Pennsylvania, U.S.		
Joan Crawford	1905?–1977	San Antonio, Texas, U.S.		
Marceline Day	1908–2000	Colorado Springs, Colorado, U.S.		
Dolores del Río ‡	1904–1983	Durango, Mexico		
Janet Gaynor	1906–1984	Philadelphia, Pennsylvania, U.S.		
Sally Long	1901–1987	Kansas City, Missouri, U.S.		
Edna Marion	1906–1957	Chicago, Illinois, U.S.		
Sally O'Neil	1908–1968	Bayonne, New Jersey, U.S.		
Vera Reynolds	1899–1962	Richmond, Virginia, U.S.		
Fay Wray ‡	1907–2004	Cardston, Alberta, Canada		

=== 1927 ===
Actress	Lifespan	Birthplace	Image	Ref.
Patricia Avery	1902–1973	Boston, Massachusetts, U.S.		
Rita Carewe	1909–1955	New York City, U.S.		
Helene Costello	1906–1957	New York City, U.S.		
Barbara Kent ‡	1907–2011	Gadsby, Alberta, Canada		
Natalie Kingston	1905–1991	Vallejo, California, U.S.		
Frances Lee	1906–2000	Eagle Grove, Iowa, U.S.		
Mary McAllister	1909–1991	Los Angeles, California, U.S.		
Gladys McConnell	1905–1979	Oklahoma City, Oklahoma, U.S.		
Sally Phipps	1911–1978	Oakland, California, U.S.		
Sally Rand	1904–1979	Elkton, Missouri, U.S.		
Martha Sleeper	1910–1983	Lake Bluff, Illinois, U.S.		
Iris Stuart	1903–1936	New York City, U.S.		
Adamae Vaughn	1905–1943	Ashland, Kentucky, U.S.		

=== 1928 ===
Actress	Lifespan	Birthplace	Image	Ref.
Lina Basquette	1907–1994	San Mateo, California, U.S.		
Flora Bramley ‡	1909–1993	London, England, U.K.		
Sue Carol	1906–1982	Chicago, Illinois, U.S.		
Ann Christy	1905–1987	Logansport, Indiana, U.S.		
June Collyer	1906–1968	New York City, U.S.		
Alice Day	1905–1995	Colorado Springs, Colorado, U.S.		
Sally Eilers	1908–1978	New York City, U.S.		
Audrey Ferris	1909–1990	Detroit, Michigan, U.S.		
Dorothy Gulliver	1908–1997	Salt Lake City, Utah, U.S.		
Gwen Lee	1904–1961	Hastings, Nebraska, U.S.		
Molly O'Day	1909–1998	Bayonne, New Jersey, U.S.		
Ruth Taylor	1905–1984	Grand Rapids, Michigan, U.S.		
Lupe Vélez ‡	1908–1944	San Luis Potosí, Mexico		

=== 1929 ===
Actress	Lifespan	Birthplace	Image	Ref.
Jean Arthur	1900–1991	Plattsburgh, New York, U.S.		
Sally Blane	1910–1997	Salt Lake City, Utah, U.S.		
Betty Boyd	1908–1971	Kansas City, Missouri, U.S.		
Ethlyne Clair	1904–1996	Talladega, Alabama, U.S.		
Doris Dawson	1905–1986	Goldfield, Nevada, U.S.		
Josephine Dunn	1906–1983	New York City, U.S.		
Helen Foster	1906–1982	Independence, Kansas, U.S.		
Doris Hill	1905–1976	Roswell, New Mexico, U.S.		
Caryl Lincoln	1903–1983	Oakland, California, U.S.		
Anita Page	1910–2008	Queens, New York City, U.S.		
Mona Rico ‡	1907–1994	Mexico City, Mexico		
Helen Twelvetrees	1908–1958	Brooklyn, New York City, U.S.		
Loretta Young	1913–2000	Salt Lake City, Utah, U.S.		

=== 1931 ===
Actress	Lifespan	Birthplace	Image	Ref.
Joan Blondell	1906–1979	New York City, U.S.		
Constance Cummings	1910–2005	Seattle, Washington, U.S.		
Frances Dade	1910–1968	Philadelphia, Pennsylvania, U.S.		
Frances Dee	1909–2004	Los Angeles, California, U.S.		
Sidney Fox	1907–1942	New York City, U.S.		
Rochelle Hudson	1916–1972	Oklahoma City, Oklahoma, U.S.		
Anita Louise	1915–1970	New York City, U.S.		
Joan Marsh	1913–2000	Porterville, California, U.S.		
Marian Marsh ‡	1913–2006	Trinidad and Tobago		
Karen Morley	1909–2003	Ottumwa, Iowa, U.S.		
Marion Shilling	1910–2004	Denver, Colorado, U.S.		
Barbara Weeks	1913–2003	Somerville, Massachusetts, U.S.		
Judith Wood	1906–2002	New York City, U.S.		

=== 1932 ===
Actress	Lifespan	Birthplace	Image	Ref.
Lona Andre	1915–1992	Nashville, Tennessee, U.S.		
Lilian Bond ‡	1908–1991	London, England, U.K.		
Mary Carlisle	1914–2018	Boston, Massachusetts, U.S.		
June Clyde	1909–1987	St. Joseph, Missouri, U.S.		
Patricia Ellis	1918–1970	Birmingham, Michigan, U.S.		
Ruth Hall	1910–2003	Jacksonville, Florida, U.S.		
Eleanor Holm	1912–2004	Brooklyn, New York City, U.S.		
Evalyn Knapp	1906–1981	Kansas City, Missouri, U.S.		
Dorothy Layton	1912–2009	Cincinnati, Ohio, U.S.		
Boots Mallory	1913–1958	New Orleans, Louisiana, U.S.		
Toshia Mori ‡	1912–1995	Kyoto, Japan		
Ginger Rogers	1911–1995	Independence, Missouri, U.S.		
Marian Shockley	1911–1981	Kansas City, Missouri, U.S.		
Gloria Stuart	1910–2010	Santa Monica, California, U.S.		
Dorothy Wilson	1909–1998	Minneapolis, Minnesota, U.S.		

=== 1934 ===
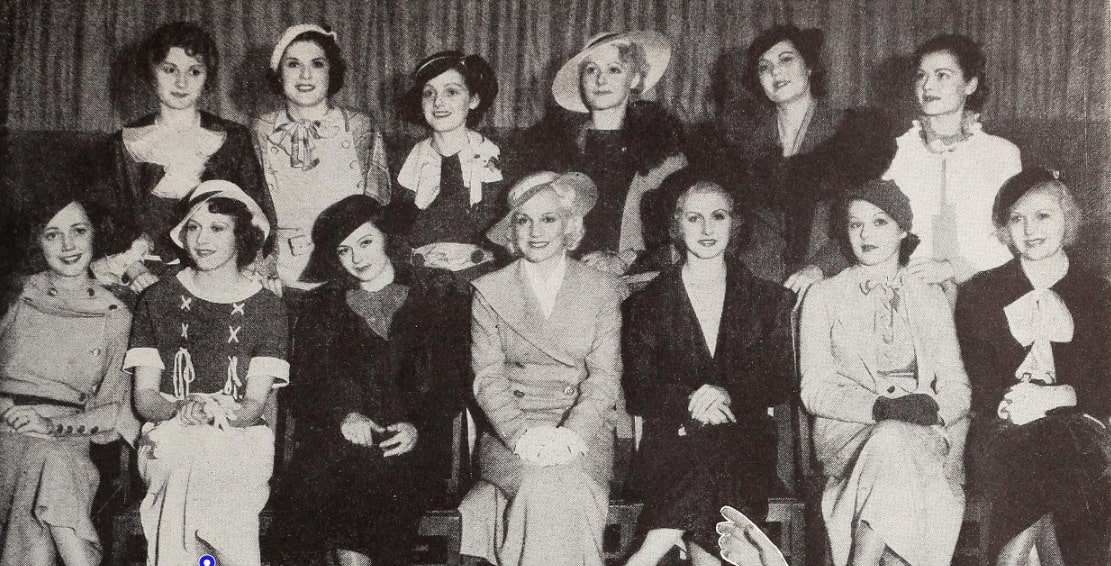
WAMPAS Baby Stars 1934

From hundreds of entrants, thirty-eight actresses paraded, and thirteen were chosen, by more than 100 Hollywood press agents at The Writers' Club, in Hollywood, California, to comprise the 1934 edition of the Wampas Baby stars.

Actress	Lifespan	Birthplace	Image	Ref.
Judith Arlen	1914–1968	Hollywood, Los Angeles, U.S.		
Betty Bryson	1911–1984	Los Angeles, California, U.S.		
Jean Carmen	1913–1993	Portland, Oregon, U.S.		
Helen Cohan	1910–1996	New York City, U.S.		
Dorothy Drake	1916–2005	Santa Monica, California, U.S.		
Jean Gale	1912–1974	San Francisco, California, U.S.		
Hazel Hayes	1910–1974	La Crosse, Kansas, U.S.		
Ann Hovey	1911–2007	Mount Vernon, Indiana, U.S.		
Neoma Judge	1908–1978	Mitchell, South Dakota, U.S.		
Lucille Lund	1913–2002	Buckley, Washington, U.S.		
Lu Ann Meredith	1913–1998	Dallas, Texas, U.S.		
Gigi Parrish	1912–2006	Cambridge, Massachusetts, U.S.		
Jacqueline Wells	1914–2001	Denver, Colorado, U.S.		
Katherine Williams	1908–1982	Seattle, Washington, U.S.		

== Works cited ==
- Liebman, Roy (2000). The Wampas Baby Stars: A Biographical Dictionary, 1922–1934. Jefferson, North Carolina: McFarland. ISBN 0-7864-0756-5.
- Mank, Gregory William (2015). Women in Horror Films, 1930s. Jefferson, North Carolina: McFarland. ISBN 978-1-4766-0954-6.
- Slide, Anthony (2014). The New Historical Dictionary of the American Film Industry. New York: Routledge. ISBN 1-135-92554-2.
- Vogel, Michelle (2010). Olive Borden: The Life and Films of Hollywood's Joy Girl. Jefferson, North Carolina: McFarland. ISBN 0-7864-5836-4.
