= Judith Arlen =

American actress (1914–1968)

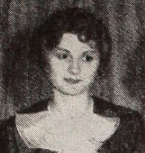
- Arlen in 1934
- Born: Laurette Elizabeth Rutherford; March 18, 1914; Los Angeles, California, U.S.
- Died: June 5, 1968 (aged 54); Santa Barbara, California, U.S.
- Occupation: Actress
- Relatives: Ann Rutherford (sister)

Judith Arlen (born Laurette Elizabeth Rutherford; March 18, 1914 – June 5, 1968) was an American film actress of Canadian descent. She was the elder sister of actress Ann Rutherford.

== Early years ==
Judith Arlen was born Laurette Rutherford in Los Angeles, to Canadian parents John Rutherford and Lucille (née Mansfield) Rutherford. Rutherford's mother was a silent film actress, and her father was a former operatic tenor. The family moved to San Francisco, and, soon afterwards, her parents separated and Lucille Mansfield moved to Los Angeles with Laurette and her sister Ann.

== Career ==
Laurette took on the stage name Judith Arlen and started her acting career in 1930 with an uncredited role in the Cecil B. DeMille film Madam Satan. She had another uncredited role in 1933, but received two credited roles in 1934, and that year she was one of 13 girls selected as "WAMPAS Baby Stars" (at the time, baby star was common slang for starlet), the last year that the "WAMPAS" titles were awarded. The 1934 film Kiss and Make-Up, which starred Cary Grant, was Arlen's next-to-last film. She had a minor role in Young and Beautiful, in which she played a WAMPAS Baby Star, after which her acting career petered out. In 1935, her younger sister Ann's career was launched. Arlen worked behind the scenes for her younger sister. She showcased her talents on stage for a film crowd at the Harold Lloyd co-founded Beverly Hills Little Theatre for Professionals.

In 1939, Arlen was host of the CBS Radio variety program Penthouse Blues. She also performed in radio soap operas that originated in Los Angeles.

By 1941, Arlen had begun using the stage name Judith Rutherford. In June 1941, she was the leading lady of the Gretna Players in Pennsylvania, performing in that company's season-opening production of Whispering Friends.

Arlen also sang professionally. In 1947, she recorded "All My Love" backed by "Dat's Love" on the DeLuxe label.
