= Lucille Lund =

American actress (1913–2002)

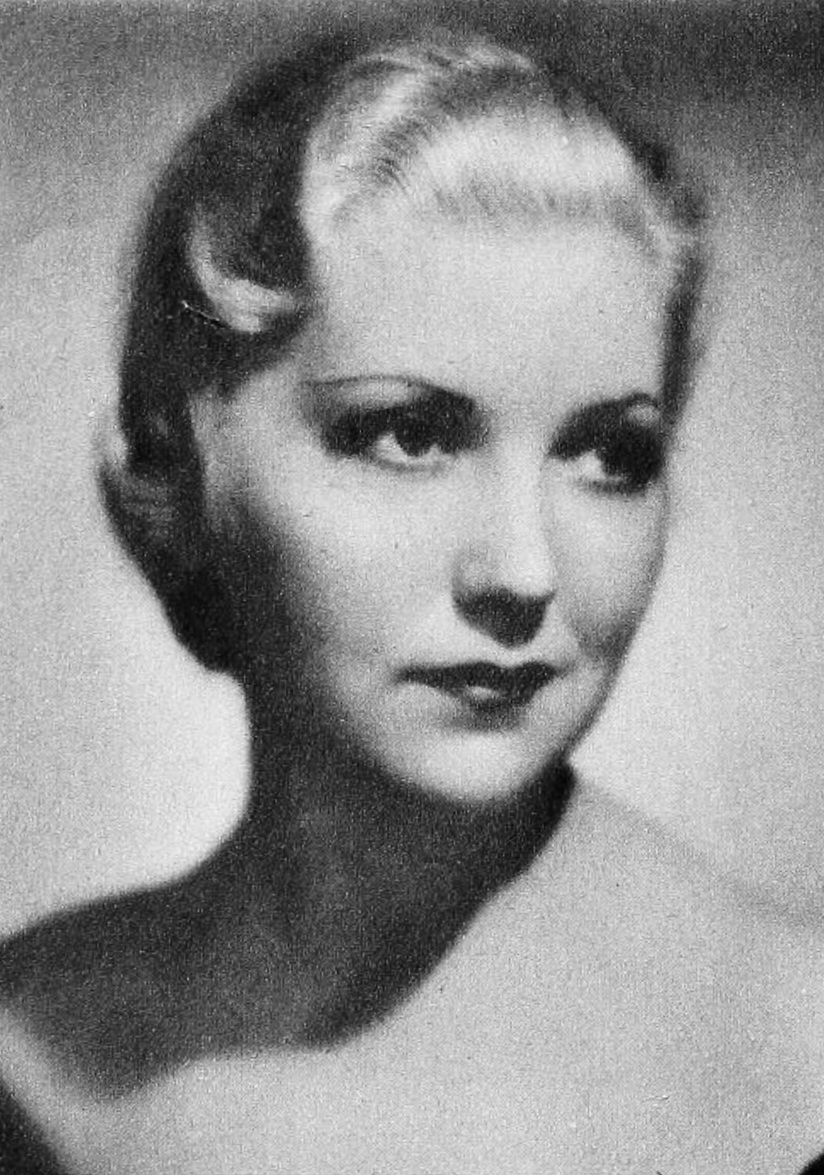
- Lund in 1934
- Born: June 3, 1913; Buckley, Washington, U.S.
- Died: February 15, 2002 (aged 88); Rolling Hills, California, U.S.
- Education: Northwestern University
- Occupation: Actress
- Years active: 1933–1939
- Spouse: Kenneth Higgins (m. 1937; died 1973)
- Children: 2

Lucille Lund (June 3, 1913 – February 15, 2002) was an American actress. She is best known for her role in the film The Black Cat (1934).

== Background ==
Lucille Lund was born on June 3, 1913, in Buckley, Washington, to Mr. and Mrs. Oluf Lund, who had emigrated from Norway. As a child, she began performing play extracts and readings. After leaving school she joined Henry Duffy Players, a stock company and toured up and down the Pacific Coast. She attended the University of Washington, Washington State College, and the Chicago Art Institute before studying drama at Northwestern University in Chicago, graduating in 1933. She was a member of Kappa Alpha Theta sorority.

== Career ==
In 1933 she won a nationwide contest, "The Most Beautiful College Coed", which included a small Universal Pictures contract as a prize. Her first film was Horseplay in 1933, in which she had a minor role, with her first noticeable film being opposite Robert Young in the 1933 movie Saturday's Millions. In 1934 she starred in six films. That year she starred in The Black Cat, a horror film starring Boris Karloff and Bela Lugosi. She also starred in the lead role opposite Reb Russell in Range Warfare, and would be named a "WAMPAS Baby Star". Of the thirteen girls selected that year to be "WAMPAS Baby Stars", only four would see any success as actresses. It was the last year that "WAMPAS" selected actresses for that title. Lund had roles in 21 films from 1935 through 1939, many of which were B-movies, such as Prison Shadows. Of her last four films, she was uncredited in three. Her final film was The Awful Goof (1939).

== Later years ==
After the death of her husband in 1973, she returned to acting in commercials. In 1997 she took part in the documentary Lugosi: Hollywood's Dracula, about the life and career of Bela Lugosi. In 2000 Lund took part in the documentary I Used to be in Pictures, which featured many actresses from the early years of Hollywood, which included Beverly Roberts, Muriel Evans and Miriam Seegar, in addition to Lund and others. The documentary searched into Hollywood's early beginnings, and its pioneers. It would be Lund's last on-camera work.

== Personal life and death ==
In 1937, Lund married Kenneth Higgins, whom she met when they were students at Northwestern. (1937–1973), a radio producer-writer. In 1939, she ended her acting career after the birth of her two daughters. She died at her home in Rolling Hills, California in 2002, aged 89.

== Filmography ==
(Per AFI database)

- Horse Play (1933) - Iris Marley
- Fighting Through (1934) - Lucille
- Kiss and Make-Up (1934) - Magda
- Young and Beautiful (1934)
- The Black Cat (1934) - Karen
- Folies Bergère de Paris (1935) - Girl in bar
- Timber War (1935) - Sally Martin
- Range Warfare (1935) - Little Feather
- Broadway Melody of 1936 (1935) - Showgirl
- Prison Shadows (1936) - Claire Thomas
- Rio Grande Romance (1936) - Rose Carter
- The Cowboy Star (1936) - Mother
- Panic on the Air (1936) - Cigarette girl
- Don't Get Personal (1936) - Bridesmaid
- It Happened in Hollywood (1936) - American girl
- The Devil is Driving (1937) - Dolly
- Blake of Scotland Yard (1937) - The Duchess
- A Fight to the Finish (1937) - Mabel
- What Price Vengeance (1937) - Babe Foster
- Start Cheering (1938) - Flossie
- There's That Woman Again (1938) - Receptionist
