= George White (producer) =

American producer, director and actor (1891–1968)

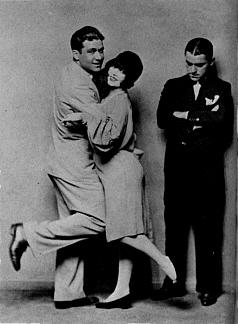
Tom Patricola, Ann Pennington & George White

George White (March 12, 1892 – November 11, 1968) was an American theatrical and film producer and director who also was an actor, choreographer, composer, dancer, dramatist, lyricist and screenwriter, as well as a Broadway theater owner.

== Biography ==
Born Eassy White in New York City (other sources claim his birth name as "George Weitz" and his birthplace as Toronto, Canada; he performed under all three names), White started his career as part of a dance team with partner Benny Ryan, performing in the burlesque circuit. He appeared in supporting roles in many Broadway shows, but it was his appearance in Florenz Ziegfeld's Ziegfeld Follies that would provide the impetus for his own career as a theatrical impresario on Broadway. White appeared in the Ziegfeld Follies of 1911 and 1915; in the latter show, he popularized the Turkey Trot dance.

He launched his Ziegfeld Follies imitation, the George White's Scandals, in 1919. Scandals provided audiences with popular songs, comic sketches, eccentric dancers and his own version of the Ziegfeld girls. Though not as grand as the Ziegfeld Follies, his Scandals were quite successful. The shows, which were micromanaged by White and reflected his tastes, were fast-paced and featured a lot of dancing. White reached the apogee of his Broadway career with the 1926 edition of Scandals, which ran for 424 performances. The Black Bottom, danced by Ziegfeld Follies star Ann Pennington and Tom Patricola, touched off a national dance craze. However, by the time he produced his last staging of Scandals in 1939, the show was derided by critics as being old-fashioned.

In addition to his Scandals and George White's Music Hall Varieties (essentially Scandals under a different name), White also produced several book musicals and legitimate plays on Broadway, including Manhattan Mary (1927), Flying High (1930), and Melody (1933).

White also was a movie director, producer and screenwriter. He produced the movies Flying High (1931), George White's Scandals (1934) George White's 1935 Scandals (1935) and George White's Scandals (1945), and directed the 1934 and 1935 celluloid versions of his Scandals. He also appeared in and took screenwriting credit for the 1934 and 1935 pictures. He also received screenwriting credits for the movies Ziegfeld Follies (1945) and Duffy's Tavern (1945).

In 1946, White was involved in a hit-and-run automobile accident in which two people died. He was sentenced to nine months in prison. Freed from jail, White tried to turn Scandals into a show that would tour the nightclub circuit. The venture failed and he went bankrupt. His attempt to open a nightclub in Las Vegas also failed.

== Death ==
White died aged 77 from leukemia in 1968 in Hollywood, California and was interred in Pierce Brothers Valhalla Memorial Park in North Hollywood.
