= List of French films of 1934 =

French films released in 1934

A list of films released in France in 1934:

== A-L ==
Title	Director	Cast	Genre	Notes
The Adventurer	Marcel L'Herbier	Blanche Montel, Victor Francen, Henri Rollan	Drama	
Amok	Fedor Ozep	Marcelle Chantal, Madeleine Guitty, Jean Yonnel	Drama	
Angèle	Marcel Pagnol	Orane Demazis, Fernandel, Édouard Delmont	Drama	
Arlette and Her Fathers	Henry Roussel	Max Dearly, Jules Berry, Renée Saint-Cyr	Comedy	
At the End of the World	Henri Chomette, Gustav Ucicky	Pierre Blanchar, Käthe von Nagy, Charles Vanel	Drama	Co-production with Germany
L'Atalante	Jean Vigo	Dita Parlo, Jean Dasté, Michel Simon	Romance, Drama	
Beauty of the Night	Louis Valray	Véra Korène, Aimé Clariond, Paul Bernard	Drama	
The Bread Peddler	René Sti	Fernandel, Mona Goya, Germaine Dermoz	Drama	
Casanova	René Barberis	Ivan Mosjoukine, Madeleine Ozeray, Jeanne Boitel	Historical	
Cease Firing	Jacques de Baroncelli	Jean Galland, Annie Ducaux, Marcel André	Drama	
Chourinette	André Hugon	Mireille Hartuch, Frédéric Duvallès, Jean Sinoël	Comedy	
The Concierge's Daughters	Jacques Tourneur	Jeanne Cheirel, Paul Azaïs, Josette Day	Comedy	
Coralie and Company	Alberto Cavalcanti	Françoise Rosay, Robert Burnier, Josette Day	Comedy	
Crainquebille	Jacques de Baroncelli	Félicien Tramel, Rachel Devirys, Jeanne Fusier-Gir	Drama	
The Crisis is Over	Robert Siodmak	Danielle Darrieux, Albert Préjean, Suzanne Dehelly	Comedy	
The Darling of His Concierge	Giuseppe Guarino	Fernandel, Colette Darfeuil, Yvette Lebon	Comedy	
The Fakir of the Grand Hotel	Pierre Billon	Armand Bernard, Paulette Dubost, Annie Ducaux	Comedy	
Fanatisme	Tony Lekain, Gaston Ravel	Pola Negri, Jean Yonnel, Andrée Lafayette	Historical drama	
Fedora	Louis J. Gasnier	Marie Bell, Ernest Ferny, Henri Bosc	Drama	
Gold in the Street	Curtis Bernhardt	Albert Préjean, Danielle Darrieux, Pierre Larquey	Comedy	
Le Grand Jeu	Jacques Feyder	Charles Vanel, Marie Bell, Françoise Rosay	Drama	
The Guardian Angel	Jean Choux	André Baugé, Pola Illéry, Paul Azaïs	Comedy	
His Other Love	Alfred Machard	Constant Rémy, Jeanne Boitel, Saturnin Fabre	Drama	
Hotel Free Exchange	Marc Allégret	Fernandel, André Alerme, Ginette Leclerc	Comedy	
The House on the Dune	Pierre Billon	Pierre Richard-Willm, Madeleine Ozeray, Colette Darfeuil	Drama	
I Have an Idea	Roger Richebé	Raimu, Simone Deguyse, Félix Oudart	Comedy	
The Ideal Woman	André Berthomieu	René Lefèvre, Marie Glory, Arlette Marchal	Comedy	
If I Were Boss	Richard Pottier	Fernand Gravey, Max Dearly, Mireille Balin	Comedy	
The Imaginary Invalid	Lucien Jaquelux	Robert Pizani, Ginette Gaubert, Nane Germon	Comedy	
In the Land of the Sun	Robert Péguy	Henri Alibert, Lisette Lanvin, Pola Illéry	Musical	
Itto	Jean Benoît-Lévy, Marie Epstein	Simone Berriau, Simone Bourday, Pauline Carton	Drama	
Jeanne	Georges Marret	Gaby Morlay, André Luguet, Hélène Perdrière	Drama	
Jofroi	Marcel Pagnol	Vincent Scotto, Charles Blavette, Charles Blavette	Drama	
Judex	Maurice Champreux	René Ferté, Louise Lagrange, Marcel Vallée	Crime	
Le Roi des Champs-Élysées	Max Nosseck	Buster Keaton, Paulette Dubost, Colette Darfeuil	Comedy	
The Lady of Lebanon	Jean Epstein	Jean Murat, Andrée Spinelly, George Grossmith	Thriller	
The Lady of the Camellias	Fernand Rivers	Yvonne Printemps, Jane Marken, Pierre Fresnay	Drama	
Lake of Ladies	Marc Allégret	Rosine Deréan, Simone Simon, Jean-Pierre Aumont	Comedy drama	
The Last Billionaire	René Clair	Max Dearly, Renée Saint-Cyr, Marthe Mellot	Comedy	
Last Hour	Jean Bernard-Derosne	Line Noro, Jean Servais, Ginette Gaubert	Drama	
The Last Night	Jacques de Casembroot	Florelle, José Noguéro, Kissa Kouprine	Comedy	
Liliom	Fritz Lang	Charles Boyer, Madeleine Ozeray, Pierre Alcover	Fantasy	
Little Jacques	Gaston Roudès	Constant Rémy, Line Noro, Annie Ducaux	Drama	

== M-Z ==
Title	Director	Cast	Genre	Notes
Madame Bovary	Jean Renoir	Max Dearly, Valentine Tessier, Pierre Renoir	Historical	
Mam'zelle Spahi	Max de Vaucorbeil	Noël-Noël, Raymond Cordy, Josette Day	Comedy	
A Man Has Been Stolen	Max Ophüls	Henri Garat, Lili Damita, Raoul Marco	Comedy thriller	
A Man of Gold	Jean Dréville	Harry Baur, Suzy Vernon, Josseline Gaël	Drama	
Maria Chapdelaine	Julien Duvivier	Madeleine Renaud, Suzanne Desprès, Jean Gabin	Drama, Romance	
Mauvaise Graine	Billy Wilder, Alexander Esway	Danielle Darrieux, Pierre Mingand, Raymond Galle	Comedy	Wilder's directorial debut
The Midnight Prince	René Guissart	Henri Garat, Edith Méra, Monique Rolland	Comedy	
Les Misérables	Raymond Bernard	Harry Baur, Charles Vanel, Charles Dullin	Drama	
Miquette	Henri Diamant-Berger	Blanche Montel, Michel Simon, Roland Toutain	Comedy	
Moscow Nights	Alexis Granowsky	Annabella, Harry Baur, Pierre Richard-Willm	Drama	
My Heart Is Calling You	Carmine Gallone, Serge Véber	Jan Kiepura, Danielle Darrieux, Lucien Baroux	Musical	Co-production with Germany
Nemo's Bank	Marguerite Viel	Victor Boucher, Mona Goya, Alice Tissot	Comedy	
On a trouvé une femme nue	Léo Joannon	Mireille Balin, Jean Aquistapace, Paul Bernard	Comedy	
One Night's Secret	Félix Gandéra	Armand Bernard, Albert Préjean, Lisette Lanvin	Comedy	
Paris-Deauville	Jean Delannoy	Marguerite Moreno, Monique Rolland, Germaine Sablon	Comedy	
The Path to Happiness	Jean Mamy	Alfred Pizella, Michel Duran, Clément Doucet	Comedy	
Poliche	Abel Gance	Constant Rémy, Marie Bell, Edith Méra	Drama	
Primerose	René Guissart	Madeleine Renaud, Henri Rollan, Marguerite Moreno	Drama	
Prince Jean	Jean de Marguenat	Pierre Richard-Willm, Natalie Paley, Nina Myral	Drama	
The Princess's Whim	Karl Hartl; Henri-Georges Clouzot	Albert Préjean, Marie Bell, Armand Bernard	Comedy	Co-production with Germany
The Queen of Biarritz	Jean Toulout	Alice Field, Léon Belières, Marguerite Moreno	Comedy	
Rapt	Dimitri Kirsanoff	Dita Parlo, Nadia Sibirskaia, Geymond Vital	Drama	
The Rosary	Tony Lekain, Gaston Ravel	Louisa de Mornand, André Luguet, Hélène Robert	Drama	
Rothchild	Marco de Gastyne	Harry Baur, Fred Pasquali, Paul Pauley	Comedy	
S.S. Tenacity	Julien Duvivier	Marie Glory, Albert Préjean	Comedy drama	
Sans famille	Marc Allégret	Robert Lynen, Aimé Clariond	Drama	
Sapho	Léonce Perret	Mary Marquet, Jean-Max, Marcelle Praince	Drama	
The Scandal	Marcel L'Herbier	Gaby Morlay, Henri Rollan, Jean Galland	Drama	
Sidonie Panache	Henry Wulschleger	Florelle, Bach, Alexandre Mihalesco, Paul Azaïs	Comedy	
Skylark	Jean Tarride	Noël-Noël, Fernandel, Junie Astor	Comedy	
Song of Farewell	Albert Valentin, Géza von Bolváry	Jean Servais, Janine Crispin, Lucienne Le Marchand	Drama	Tobis
Street Without a Name	Pierre Chenal	Constant Rémy, Gabriel Gabrio, Pola Illéry	Drama	
Tartarin of Tarascon	Raymond Bernard	Raimu, Fernand Charpin, Jenny Hélia	Comedy	
Three Sailors	Charles Barrois	Armand Bernard, Betty Stockfeld, Fernand Charpin	Comedy	
Toboggan	Henri Decoin	Georges Carpentier, Arlette Marchal, Raymond Cordy	Sports drama	
A Train in the Night	René Hervil	Dolly Davis, Georgius, Alice Tissot	Mystery	
The Typist Gets Married	René Pujol, Joe May	Marie Glory, Jean Murat, Armand Bernard	Comedy	
The Uncle from Peking	Jacques Darmont	Armand Bernard, Janine Merrey, Claude May	Comedy	
Volga in Flames	Victor Tourjansky	Albert Préjean, Valéry Inkijinoff, Danielle Darrieux	Historical	
We Are Not Children	Augusto Genina	Gaby Morlay, Claude Dauphin, Jean Wall	Comedy	
Your Smile	Monty Banks, Pierre Caron	Victor Boucher, Marie Glory, Raymond Rognoni	Comedy	
Youth	Georges Lacombe	Robert Arnoux, Lisette Lanvin, Jean Servais	Drama	
Zouzou	Marc Allégret	Josephine Baker, Jean Gabin, Yvette Lebon	Musical comedy	

== See also ==
- 1934 in France
