= 1934 in film =

The following is an overview of 1934 in film, including significant events, a list of films released and notable births and deaths.

== Events ==
- January 26 – Producer Samuel Goldwyn purchases the film rights to The Wonderful Wizard of Oz from the L. Frank Baum estate for $40,000. Goldwyn will decline to adapt the book and sell the rights to Metro-Goldwyn-Mayer.
- February 19 – Bob Hope marries Dolores Reade.
- April 9 – Danish actress Alice O'Fredericks makes her directorial debut, in partnership with Lau Lauritzen Jr., with Ud i den kolde sne. The pair go on to make a further 26 films together.
- April 19 – Fox Studios releases Stand Up and Cheer!, with five-year-old Shirley Temple in a relatively minor role. Shirley steals the film and Fox, which had been near bankruptcy, finds itself owning a goldmine.
- May 18 – Paramount releases Little Miss Marker, with Shirley Temple, on loan from Fox, in the title role.
- May 25 – The Thin Man series is launched, starring William Powell and Myrna Loy as Nick and Nora Charles, based on stories by Dashiell Hammett.
- June 13 – An amendment to the Production Code establishes the Production Code Administration, and requires all films to obtain a certificate of approval before being released.
- July 28 – Canadian-born actress Marie Dressler, best known for starring in films such as Min and Bill and Emma, dies from cancer in Santa Barbara, California at the age of 65. For her performance in Min and Bill, Dressler received the Academy Award for Best Actress.
- October 19 – Fred Astaire and Ginger Rogers wham audiences again with their first joint starring roles in The Gay Divorcee, grossing $1.8 million to add to the $1.5 million earned by Flying Down to Rio released at the end of 1933.
- November 12 – The musical Babes in Toyland debuts, starring Stan Laurel and Oliver Hardy.
- December 11 – Fox releases the Sol M. Wurtzel production of Bright Eyes, starring their hot new property, Shirley Temple. Shirley sings "On the Good Ship Lollipop", and wins the first Academy Award ever given to a child, for her endearing portrayal of Shirley Blake.
- unknown date In France, Robert Bresson makes his directorial debut with the short film, Les affaires publiques.

== Academy Awards ==
The 7th Academy Awards was held on February 27, 1935, at the Biltmore Hotel in Los Angeles. They were hosted by Irvin S. Cobb. For the first time, the Academy standardized the practice – still in effect, notwithstanding changes to the 93rd and 94th Academy Awards as a result of the COVID-19 pandemic – that the award eligibility period for a film would be the preceding calendar year.

Most nominations: One Night of Love (Columbia Pictures) – 6

Major Awards

- Best Picture: It Happened One Night – Columbia Pictures
- Best Director: Frank Capra – It Happened One Night
- Best Actor: Clark Gable – It Happened One Night
- Best Actress: Claudette Colbert – It Happened One Night

Most Awards: It Happened One Night – 5

It Happened One Night became the first film to perform a "clean sweep" of the top five award categories: Best Picture, Best Director, Best Actor, Best Actress, and Best Screenplay. This feat would later be duplicated by One Flew Over the Cuckoo's Nest in 1976 and The Silence of the Lambs in 1992. It also was the first romantic comedy to be named Best Picture.

== Top-grossing films (U.S.) ==
The top ten 1934 released films by box office gross in North America are as follows:

Highest-grossing films of 1934
Rank	Title	Distributor	Domestic rentals
1	Kid Millions	United Artists	$2,000,000
2	Cleopatra	Paramount	$1,929,161
3	Forsaking All Others	MGM	$1,399,000
4	It Happened One Night	Columbia	$1,366,000
5	Chained	MGM	$1,301,000
6	Wonder Bar	Warner Bros./First National	$1,264,000
7	The Barretts of Wimpole Street	MGM	$1,258,000
8	Here Comes the Navy	Warner Bros.	$1,183,000
9	Judge Priest	Fox Film	$1,176,000
10	Treasure Island	MGM	$1,164,000

== Notable films ==
United States unless stated

=== # ===
- 1860, directed by Alessandro Blasetti – (Italy)

=== A ===
- The Affairs of Cellini, directed by Gregory La Cava, starring Frank Morgan, Fredric March, and Constance Bennett
- All of Me, directed by James Flood, starring Fredric March, Miriam Hopkins, and George Raft
- Amok, directed by Fedor Ozep – (France)
- Angèle, directed by Marcel Pagnol, starring Fernandel – (France)
- Anne of Green Gables, directed by George Nicholls Jr., starring Anne Shirley
- Are We Civilized?, directed by Edwin Carewe, starring William Farnum
- L'Atalante, directed by Jean Vigo, starring Michel Simon – (France)

=== B ===
- Babes in Toyland, directed by Gus Meins and Charles Rogers, starring Laurel and Hardy
- Baby, Take a Bow, directed by Harry Lachman, starring Shirley Temple and Claire Trevor
- The Barretts of Wimpole Street, directed by Sidney Franklin, starring Norma Shearer, Fredric March and Charles Laughton
- The Battle, directed by Nicolas Farkas, starring Charles Boyer, Merle Oberon and John Loder – (GB/France)
- Belle of the Nineties, directed by Leo McCarey, starring Mae West and Johnny Mack Brown
- The Big Road (Dàlù), directed by Sun Yu – (China)
- The Big Shakedown, directed by John Francis Dillon, starring Charles Farrell, Bette Davis, Ricardo Cortez and Glenda Farrell
- The Black Cat, directed by Edgar G. Ulmer, starring Boris Karloff and Béla Lugosi
- Bolero, directed by Wesley Ruggles, starring George Raft and Carole Lombard
- Boots! Boots!, directed by Bert Tracy, starring George Formby – (GB)
- Born to Be Bad, directed by Lowell Sherman, starring Loretta Young and Cary Grant
- Bright Eyes, directed by David Butler, starring Shirley Temple and James Dunn
- Broadway Bill, directed by Frank Capra, starring Warner Baxter and Myrna Loy
- Bulldog Drummond Strikes Back, directed by Roy Del Ruth, starring Ronald Colman, Loretta Young, Warner Oland and Una Merkel

=== C ===
- The Captain Hates the Sea, directed by Lewis Milestone, starring Victor McLaglen and John Gilbert
- Carolina, directed by Henry King, starring Janet Gaynor and Lionel Barrymore
- The Case of the Howling Dog, directed by Alan Crosland, starring Warren William and Mary Astor
- The Cat and the Fiddle, directed by William K. Howard, starring Ramón Novarro, Jeanette MacDonald and Frank Morgan
- The Cat's-Paw, directed by Sam Taylor, starring Harold Lloyd and Una Merkel
- Chained, directed by Clarence Brown, starring Joan Crawford, Clark Gable and Otto Kruger
- Chapayev, directed by the Vasilyev Brothers, starring Boris Babochkin – (USSR)
- Charlie Chan in London, directed by Eugene Forde, starring Warner Oland and Ray Milland
- Charlie Chan's Courage (lost), directed by Eugene Forde, starring Warner Oland
- The Circus Clown, directed by Ray Enright, starring Joe E. Brown
- City Limits, directed by William Nigh, starring Frank Craven and Sally Blane
- Cleopatra, directed by Cecil B. DeMille, starring Claudette Colbert and Warren William
- Colonel Blood, directed by W. P. Lipscomb, starring Frank Cellier – (GB)
- The Count of Monte Cristo, directed by Rowland V. Lee, starring Robert Donat
- Crime Without Passion, directed by Ben Hecht and Charles MacArthur, starring Claude Rains

=== D ===
- Dames, directed by Ray Enright, starring Ruby Keeler, Dick Powell, Joan Blondell and ZaSu Pitts
- Dark Hazard, directed by Alfred E. Green, starring Edward G. Robinson and Glenda Farrell
- David Harum, directed by James Cruze, starring Will Rogers
- Death on the Diamond, directed by Edward Sedgwick, starring Robert Young
- Death Takes a Holiday, directed by Mitchell Leisen, starring Fredric March
- Don't Make Grandpa Angry (Nezlobte dědečka), directed by Karel Lamač, starring Vlasta Burian, Čeněk Šlégl and Adina Mandlová – (Czechoslovakia)
- The Dream Car (Meseautó), directed by Béla Gaál and starring Zita Perczel and Jenő Törzs – (Hungary)

=== E ===
- Evelyn Prentice, directed by William K. Howard, starring William Powell, Myrna Loy and Una Merkel
- Evergreen, directed by Victor Saville, starring Jessie Matthews – (GB)
- Everybody's Woman (La signora di tutti), directed by Max Ophüls, starring Isa Miranda – (Italy)

=== F ===
- Fashions of 1934, directed by William Dieterle, starring William Powell and Bette Davis
- Ferdowsi, directed by Abdolhossein Sepanta – (Iran)
- Flirtation Walk, directed by Frank Borzage, starring Dick Powell, Ruby Keeler and Pat O'Brien
- Fog Over Frisco, directed by William Dieterle, starring Bette Davis, Margaret Lindsay and Lyle Talbot
- Forbidden Territory, directed by Phil Rosen, starring Gregory Ratoff and Binnie Barnes – (GB)
- Forsaking All Others, directed by W. S. Van Dyke, starring Joan Crawford, Clark Gable and Robert Montgomery
- Four Frightened People, directed by Cecil B. DeMille, starring Claudette Colbert and Herbert Marshall
- Frontier Marshal, directed by Lewis Seiler, starring George O' Brien

=== G ===
- Gambling, directed by Rowland V. Lee, starring George M. Cohan
- Gambling Lady, directed by Archie Mayo, starring Barbara Stanwyck, Joel McCrea and Pat O'Brien
- The Gay Bride directed by Jack Conway, starring Carole Lombard, Chester Morris and ZaSu Pitts
- The Gay Divorcee directed by Mark Sandrich, starring Fred Astaire, Ginger Rogers and Alice Brady
- The Girl from Missouri, directed by Jack Conway, starring Jean Harlow, Lionel Barrymore, Franchot Tone and Lewis Stone
- Girl o' My Dreams, directed by Ray McCarey, starring Mary Carlisle, Edward J. Nugent and Lon Chaney Jr.
- Glamour, directed by William Wyler, starring Paul Lukas and Constance Cummings
- The Goddess (Shen nu), directed by Wu Yonggang, starring Ruan Lingyu – (China)
- Grand Canary, directed by Irving Cummings, starring Warner Baxter and Madge Evans
- Le Grand Jeu (The Great Game), directed by Jacques Feyder, starring Marie Bell and Pierre Richard-Willm – (France)
- Great Expectations, directed by Stuart Walker, starring Henry Hull and Jane Wyatt

=== H ===
- Heat Lightning, directed by Mervyn LeRoy, starring Aline MacMahon, Ann Dvorak, and Preston Foster
- Here Comes the Navy, directed by Lloyd Bacon, starring James Cagney, Pat O'Brien and Gloria Stuart
- Here is My Heart, directed by Frank Tuttle, starring Bing Crosby and Kitty Carlisle
- Hide-Out, directed by W. S. Van Dyke, starring Robert Montgomery, Maureen O'Sullivan and Edward Arnold
- Hollywood Party, starring Laurel and Hardy, Jimmy Durante and Lupe Vélez
- The House of Rothschild, directed by Alfred L. Werker, starring George Arliss, Loretta Young, Boris Karloff and Robert Young

=== I ===
- Imitation of Life, directed by John M. Stahl, starring Claudette Colbert and Warren William
- The Iron Duke, directed by Victor Saville, starring George Arliss – (GB)
- It Happened One Night, directed by Frank Capra, starring Clark Gable and Claudette Colbert
- It's a Gift, directed by Norman Z. McLeod, starring W. C. Fields
- I've Got Your Number, directed by Ray Enright, starring Joan Blondell, Pat O'Brien and Glenda Farrell

=== J ===
- Jane Eyre, directed by Christy Cabanne, starring Virginia Bruce and Colin Clive
- Jew Süss, directed by Lothar Mendes, starring Conrad Veidt – (GB)
- Jimmy the Gent, directed by Michael Curtiz, starring James Cagney and Bette Davis
- Jolly Fellows (Vesyolye rebyata), directed by Grigori Aleksandrov, starring Lyubov Orlova – (USSR)
- Juárez y Maximiliano (Juarez and Maximilian), directed by Miguel Contreras Torres and Raphael J. Sevilla – (Mexico)
- Judge Priest, directed by John Ford, starring Will Rogers

=== K ===
- The Key, directed by Michael Curtiz, starring William Powell and Edna Best
- Kid Millions, directed by Roy Del Ruth, starring Eddie Cantor, Ann Sothern and Ethel Merman
- Kiss and Make-Up, directed by Harlan Thompson, starring Cary Grant and Helen Mack

=== L ===
- The Lady Is Willing, directed by Gilbert Miller, starring Leslie Howard and Cedric Hardwicke – (GB)
- The Last Round-Up, directed by Henry Hathaway, starring Randolph Scott
- Lieutenant Kijé (Poruchik Kizhe), directed by Aleksandr Faintsimmer, starring Mikhail Yanshin – (USSR)
- Liliom, directed by Fritz Lang, starring Charles Boyer – (France)
- Limehouse Blues, directed by Alexander Hall, starring George Raft, Jean Parker and Anna May Wong
- Little Man, What Now?, directed by Frank Borzage, starring Margaret Sullavan and Douglass Montgomery
- The Little Minister, directed by Richard Wallace, starring Katharine Hepburn and John Beal
- Little Miss Marker, directed by Alexander Hall, starring Adolphe Menjou, Charles Bickford and Shirley Temple
- A Lost Lady, directed by Alfred E. Green, starring Barbara Stanwyck, Frank Morgan, Ricardo Cortez and Lyle Talbot
- The Lost Patrol, directed by John Ford, starring Victor McLaglen, Boris Karloff and Wallace Ford
- The Lucky Texan, directed by Robert N. Bradbury, starring John Wayne

=== M-N ===
- Madame Du Barry, directed by William Dieterle, starring Dolores del Río
- The Man from Utah, directed by Robert N. Bradbury, starring John Wayne
- Man of Aran, documentary directed by Robert J. Flaherty – (Ireland)
- The Man Who Knew Too Much, directed by Alfred Hitchcock, starring Peter Lorre, Leslie Banks and Edna Best – (GB)
- The Man with Two Faces, directed by Archie Mayo, starring Edward G. Robinson, Mary Astor, Ricardo Cortez and Mae Clarke
- Managed Money, directed by Charles Lamont, starring Shirley Temple
- Mandalay, directed by Michael Curtiz, starring Kay Francis, Ricardo Cortez, Warner Oland and Lyle Talbot
- Manhattan Melodrama, directed by W. S. Van Dyke, starring Clark Gable, William Powell and Myrna Loy
- Maniac, directed by Dwain Esper
- Mauvaise Graine (Bad Seed), directed by Billy Wilder and Alexander Esway, starring Danielle Darrieux – (France)
- The Merry Widow (La veuve joyeuse), directed by Ernst Lubitsch, starring Maurice Chevalier, Jeanette MacDonald and Una Merkel – (France/US)
- The Mighty Barnum, directed by Walter Lang, starring Wallace Beery and Adolphe Menjou
- Les Misérables, directed by Raymond Bernard, starring Harry Baur and Charles Vanel – (France)
- Murder at Monte Carlo (lost), directed by Ralph Ince, starring Errol Flynn – (GB)
- Now and Forever, directed by Henry Hathaway, starring Gary Cooper, Carole Lombard and Shirley Temple
- Now I'll Tell, directed by Edwin J. Burke, starring Spencer Tracy, Helen Twelvetrees and Alice Faye

=== O ===
- Of Human Bondage, directed by John Cromwell, starring Leslie Howard and Bette Davis
- The Old Curiosity Shop, directed by Thomas Bentley – (GB)
- The Old Fashioned Way, directed by William Beaudine, starring W. C. Fields
- One More River, directed by James Whale, starring Colin Clive
- One Night of Love, directed by Victor Schertzinger, starring Grace Moore and Lyle Talbot
- Operator 13, directed by Richard Boleslawski, starring Marion Davies, Gary Cooper and Jean Parker
- Our Daily Bread, directed by King Vidor, starring Karen Morley and Tom Keene

=== P ===
- The Painted Veil, directed by Richard Boleslawski, starring Greta Garbo, Herbert Marshall, George Brent and Warner Oland
- Pardon My Pups, directed by Charles Lamont, starring Shirley Temple
- Peck's Bad Boy, directed by Edward F. Cline, starring Jackie Cooper
- Plunder of Peach and Plum (Táolǐ Jié), directed by Ying Yunwei, starring Yuan Muzhi and Chen Bo'er – (China)
- The Private Life of Don Juan, directed by Alexander Korda, starring Douglas Fairbanks and Merle Oberon – (GB)
- The Pursuit of Happiness, directed by Alexander Hall, starring Francis Lederer and Joan Bennett

=== R ===
- Radio Parade of 1935, directed by Arthur B. Woods, starring Will Hay – (GB)
- Red Ensign, directed by Michael Powell, starring Leslie Banks – (GB)
- The Return of Bulldog Drummond, directed by Walter Summers, starring Ralph Richardson and Ann Todd – (GB)
- The Richest Girl in the World, directed by William A. Seiter, starring Miriam Hopkins, Joel McCrea and Fay Wray
- Riptide, directed by Edmund Goulding, starring Norma Shearer, Robert Montgomery and Herbert Marshall
- The Rise of Catherine the Great, directed by Paul Czinner, starring Elisabeth Bergner and Douglas Fairbanks Jr. – (GB)
- Road House, directed by Maurice Elvey, starring Violet Loraine and Gordon Harker (GB)
- Le Roi des Champs-Élysées (The King of the Champs-Élysées), directed by Max Nosseck, starring Buster Keaton – (France)

=== S ===
- Sadie McKee, directed by Clarence Brown, starring Joan Crawford, Franchot Tone, Gene Raymond and Edward Arnold
- The Scarlet Empress, directed by Josef von Sternberg, starring Marlene Dietrich and John Lodge
- The Scarlet Pimpernel, directed by Harold Young, starring Leslie Howard, Merle Oberon and Raymond Massey – (GB)
- Servants' Entrance, directed by Frank Lloyd, starring Janet Gaynor and Lew Ayres
- She Loves Me Not, directed by Elliott Nugent, starring Bing Crosby and Miriam Hopkins
- Shirin and Farhad, directed by Abdolhossein Sepanta, starring Roohangiz Saminejad – (Iran)
- The Silver Streak, directed by Tommy Atkins, starring Sally Blane and Charles Starrett
- Sing as We Go, directed by Basil Dean, starring Gracie Fields – (GB)
- Six of a Kind, directed by Leo McCarey, starring Charles Ruggles, Mary Boland, W. C. Fields, George Burns and Gracie Allen
- Something Always Happens, directed by Michael Powell, starring Ian Hunter and Nancy O'Neil – (GB)
- The Song of Ceylon, documentary directed by Basil Wright – (GB)
- Song of the Fishermen (Yú guāng qǔ), directed by Cai Chusheng – (China)
- Spitfire, directed by John Cromwell, starring Katharine Hepburn, Robert Young and Ralph Bellamy
- The St. Louis Kid, directed by Ray Enright, starring James Cagney
- Stand Up and Cheer!, directed by Hamilton MacFadden, starring Warner Baxter, Madge Evans and Shirley Temple
- A Story of Floating Weeds (Ukikusa monogatari), directed by Yasujirō Ozu – (Japan)

=== T ===
- The Tars (De Jantjes), directed by Jaap Speyer – (Netherlands)
- Tarzan and His Mate, directed by Cedric Gibbons, starring Johnny Weissmuller, Maureen O'Sullivan and Neil Hamilton
- The Thin Man, directed by W. S. Van Dyke, starring William Powell, Myrna Loy and Maureen O'Sullivan
- Thirty-Day Princess, directed by Marion Gering, starring Sylvia Sidney and Cary Grant
- Those Were the Days, directed by Thomas Bentley, starring Will Hay and John Mills – (GB)
- The Trail Beyond, directed by Robert N. Bradbury, starring John Wayne
- Treasure Island, directed by Victor Fleming, starring Wallace Beery, Jackie Cooper, Lionel Barrymore, Otto Kruger, Lewis Stone and Nigel Bruce
- Twentieth Century, directed by Howard Hawks, starring John Barrymore and Carole Lombard
- Twenty Million Sweethearts, directed by Ray Enright, starring Dick Powell, Pat O'Brien and Ginger Rogers

=== U-V ===
- Unfinished Symphony, directed by Anthony Asquith and Willi Forst, starring Márta Eggerth – (GB/Austria)
- Viva Villa!, directed by Jack Conway, starring Wallace Beery and Fay Wray

=== W ===
- Waltzes from Vienna, directed by Alfred Hitchcock, starring Esmond Knight, Jessie Matthews and Edmund Gwenn – (GB)
- We're Not Dressing, directed by Norman Taurog, starring Bing Crosby, Carole Lombard, George Burns, Gracie Allen and Ethel Merman
- We're Rich Again, directed by William A. Seiter, starring Edna May Oliver and Billie Burke
- What Every Woman Knows, directed by Gregory La Cava, starring Helen Hayes
- Whirlpool, directed by Roy William Neill, starring Jack Holt and Jean Arthur
- The White Parade, directed by Irving Cummings, starring Loretta Young and John Boles
- A Wicked Woman, directed by Charles Brabin, starring Mady Christians, Jean Parker and Charles Bickford
- The Woman of the Port (La Mujer del Puerto), directed by Arcady Boytler, starring Andrea Palma – (Mexico)
- Wonder Bar, directed by Lloyd Bacon, starring Al Jolson, Kay Francis, Dolores del Río, Ricardo Cortez and Dick Powell
- Workers, Let's Go (Hej rup!), directed by Martin Frič – (Czechoslovakia)
- The World Moves On, directed by John Ford, starring Madeleine Carroll and Franchot Tone

=== Y-Z ===
- You Can't Buy Everything, directed by Charles Reisner, starring May Robson, Jean Parker and Lewis Stone
- Young and Beautiful, directed by Joseph Santley, starring William Haines
- You're Telling Me!, directed by Erle C. Kenton, starring W. C. Fields
- Zouzou, directed by Marc Allégret, starring Josephine Baker and Jean Gabin – (France)

== 1934 film releases ==
United States unless stated

=== January–March ===
- January 1934
  - 6 January
    - The Big Shakedown
  - 19 January
    - Frontier Marshal
  - 22 January
    - The Lucky Texan
  - 26 January
    - Four Frightened People
    - You Can't Buy Everything
  - Unknown
    - Colonel Blood
- February 1934
  - 1 February
    - All of Me
  - 2 February
    - Carolina
  - 3 February
    - Dark Hazard
    - I've Got Your Number
  - 9 February
    - Les Misérables (France)
    - The Rise of Catherine the Great (GB)
    - Six of a Kind
    - The Tars (Netherlands)
  - 10 February
    - Mandalay
  - 14 February
    - Fashions of 1934
  - 16 February
    - The Cat and the Fiddle
    - The Lost Patrol
  - 22 February
    - It Happened One Night
  - 23 February
    - Bolero
    - Death Takes a Holiday
  - 25 February
    - Managed Money
- March 1934
  - 3 March
    - David Harum
  - 17 March
    - Jimmy the Gent
  - 30 March
    - Riptide
    - Spitfire
  - 31 March
    - Gambling Lady
    - Wonder Bar

=== April–June ===
- April 1934
  - 5 April
    - You're Telling Me!
  - 7 April
    - The House of Rothschild
  - 9 April
    - Glamour
  - 10 April
    - Viva Villa!
    - Whirlpool
  - 15 April
    - City Limits
  - 16 April
    - Tarzan and His Mate
  - 26 April
    - We're Not Dressing
  - 27 April
    - Liliom
- May 1934
  - 1 May
    - The Last Round-Up
    - Little Man, What Now?
  - 2 May
    - Le Grand Jeu
  - 3 May
    - Twentieth Century
  - 4 May
    - Manhattan Melodrama
    - Stand Up and Cheer!
  - 9 May
    - Sadie McKee
  - 15 May
    - The Man from Utah
  - 18 May
    - The Black Cat
    - Born to Be Bad
    - Thirty-Day Princess
  - 25 May
    - The Thin Man
  - 26 May
    - Twenty Million Sweethearts
  - 31 May
    - The Key
- June 1934
  - 1 June
    - Little Miss Marker
  - 2 June
    - Fog Over Frisco
    - Operator 13
  - 4 June
    - Red Ensign
  - 6 June
    - Are We Civilized?
  - 8 June
    - Now I'll Tell
  - 13 June
    - The Circus Clown
  - 28 June
    - Of Human Bondage
    - The World Moves On
  - 30 June
    - Baby Take a Bow

=== July–September ===
- July 1934
  - 6 July
    - Charlie Chan's Courage
  - 13 July
    - Kiss and Make-Up
    - The Old Fashioned Way
    - We're Rich Again
  - 20 July
    - Grand Canary
  - 21 July
    - Here Comes the Navy
  - 30 July
    - The Cat's-Paw
- August 1934
  - 3 August
    - The Girl from Missouri
  - 4 August
    - The Man with Two Faces
  - 6 August
    - One More River
  - 13 August
    - Everybody's Woman (Italy)
  - 15 August
    - Bulldog Drummond Strikes Back
    - Jane Eyre
  - 16 August
    - Dames
  - 17 August
    - Treasure Island
  - 23 August
    - Unfinished Symphony
  - 24 August
    - Hide-Out
  - 30 August
    - Crime Without Passion
  - 31 August
    - Chained
    - Now and Forever
    - Peck's Bad Boy
    - She Loves Me Not
- September 1934
  - 5 September
    - One Night of Love
  - 7 September
    - The Count of Monte Cristo
  - 11 September
    - Maniac
  - 12 September
    - L'Atalante (France)
    - Charlie Chan in London
  - 14 September
    - The Barretts of Wimpole Street
    - Death on the Diamond
  - 15 September
    - The Scarlet Empress
  - 17 September
    - Young and Beautiful
  - 19 September
    - A Lost Lady
  - 21 September
    - Belle of the Nineties
    - The Richest Girl in the World
  - 22 September
    - The Case of the Howling Dog
  - 28 September
    - Judge Priest
    - The Pursuit of Happiness

=== October–December ===
- October 1934
  - 1 October
    - She Had to Choose
  - 2 October
    - Our Daily Bread
  - 4 October
    - Jew Süss
  - 5 October
    - Cleopatra
  - 8 October
    - The Return of Bulldog Drummond
  - 13 October
    - Madame Du Barry
  - 18 October
    - Man of Aran (GB)
  - 19 October
    - Forbidden Territory
    - The Gay Divorcee
    - What Every Woman Knows
  - 22 October
    - The Captain Hates the Sea
    - Great Expectations
    - The Trail Beyond
- November 1934
  - 2 November
    - The Merry Widow(France/US)
  - 3 November
    - Gambling
  - 9 November
    - Evelyn Prentice
  - 10 November
    - Kid Millions
    - The St. Louis Kid
  - 16 November
    - The White Parade
  - 17 November
    - Girl o' My Dreams
    - It's a Gift
  - 23 November
    - Anne of Green Gables
    - The Painted Veil
  - 26 November
    - Imitation of Life
  - 29 November
    - Road House(GB)
  - 30 November
    - Babes in Toyland
    - Broadway Bill
    - The Iron Duke
    - The Private Life of Don Juan (GB)
- December 1934
  - 1 December
    - Flirtation Walk
  - 7 December
    - A Wicked Woman
  - 9 December
    - Lieutenant Kijé
  - 10 December
    - Something Always Happens (GB)
  - 11 December
    - Limehouse Blues
    - Le Roi des Champs-Élysées (France)
  - 14 December
    - The Dream Car
    - The Gay Bride
  - 21 December
    - The Silver Streak
  - 23 December
    - Forsaking All Others
    - The Mighty Barnum
    - The Scarlet Pimpernel (GB)
  - 28 December
    - Bright Eyes
    - Here is My Heart
    - The Little Minister
  - 31 December
    - Evergreen (GB)

== Serials ==
- Burn 'Em Up Barnes (released June 16) (12-chapter Mascot Pictures action), starring Frankie Darro and (as Barnes) Jack Mulhall
- Mystery Mountain (released December 3) (12-chapter Mascot Pictures western), starring Ken Maynard
- The Lost Jungle
- The Law of the Wild, starring Rin Tin Tin
- Pirate Treasure
- The Red Rider (released July 16) (15-chapter Universal Pictures western), starring Buck Jones
- Tailspin Tommy (released October 29) (12-chapter Universal Pictures action), starring Maurice Murphy
- The Vanishing Shadow
- Young Eagles

== Comedy film series and shorts ==
Harold Lloyd (1913–1938)

- The Cat's-Paw

Lupino Lane (1915–1939)

- My Old Duchess (directed by)

Buster Keaton (1917–1944)

- The Gold Ghost (short, directed by)
- Allez Oop (short, directed by)
- Le Roi des Champs-Élysées (feature)

Laurel and Hardy (1921–1945)

- Oliver the Eighth (short)
- Hollywood Party (feature)
- Going Bye-Bye! (short)
- Them Thar Hills (short)
- Babes in Toyland (feature)
- The Live Ghost (short)

Our Gang (1922–1944)

- Hi'-Neighbor!
- For Pete's Sake!
- The First Round-Up
- Honky Donkey
- Mike Fright
- Washee Ironee

Harry Langdon (1924–1936)

- Circus Hoodoo (short)
- Petting Preferred (short)
- Counsel on De Fence (short) as Darrow Langdon
- Shivers (short) as Ichabod Somerset Crop

Wheeler & Woolsey (1929–1937)

- Hips, Hips, Hooray!
- Cockeyed Cavaliers
- Kentucky Kernels

Ted Healy and His Stooges (1933–1934)
The Three Stooges (1934–1959)

- Woman Haters (May 5)
- Punch Drunks (July 13)
- Men in Black (September 28) AAN
- Screen Snapshots Series 14 #1 (September 29)
- Screen Snapshots Series 14 #2 (October 26)
- The Captain Hates the Sea (November 28) §
- Three Little Pigskins (December 8)

== Animated short film series ==
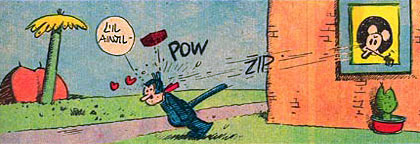
Krazy Kat.

- Krazy Kat (1925–1940)
  - The Autograph Hunter
  - Southern Exposure
  - Tom Thumb
  - Cinder Alley
  - Bowery Daze
  - Busy Bus
  - Masquerade Party
  - The Trapeze Artist
  - The Katnips of 1940
  - Krazy's Waterloo
  - Goofy Gondolas
- Oswald the Lucky Rabbit (1927–1938)
  - Chicken Reel
  - The Candy House
  - The County Fair
  - The Toy Shoppe
  - Kings Up
  - Wolf! Wolf!
  - The Ginger Bread Boy
  - Goldielocks and the Three Bears
  - Annie Moved Away
  - Wax Works
  - William Tell
  - Chris Columbus, Jr.
  - The Dizzy Dwarf
  - Ye Happy Pilgrims
  - Sky Larks
  - Spring in the Park
- Mickey Mouse (1928–1953)
  - Shanghaied
  - Camping Out – known as "Camping Troubles" in releases outside the United States.
  - Playful Pluto
  - Gulliver Mickey
  - Hollywood Party (guest appearance)
  - Mickey's Steam Roller – First appearance of Mickey's nephews.
  - Orphan's Benefit – First time Donald Duck from The Wise Little Hen appears in a Mickey cartoon. First appearance of Clara Cluck. Last black and white appearance of Clarabelle Cow and Horace Horsecollar. First cartoon were Mickey wears a shirt.
  - Mickey Plays Papa
  - The Dognapper
  - Two-Gun Mickey – Last black and white appearance of Minnie Mouse.
- Silly Symphonies (1929–1939)
  - The China Shop
  - The Grasshopper and the Ants
  - Funny Little Bunnies
  - The Big Bad Wolf
  - The Wise Little Hen
  - The Flying Mouse
  - Peculiar Penguins
  - The Goddess of Spring
- Screen Songs (1929–1938)
  - Keeps Rainin' All the Time
  - Let's All Sing Like the Birdies Sing
  - Tune Up and Sing
  - Lazy Bones
  - This Little Piggie Went to Market
  - She Reminds Me of You
  - Love Thy Neighbor
  - Let's Sing with Popeye
- Looney Tunes and Merrie Melodies (1930–1969)
  - Buddy the Gob
  - Pettin' in the Park
  - Honeymoon Hotel
  - Buddy and Towser
  - Buddy's Garage
  - Beauty and the Beast
  - Those Were Wonderful Days
  - Buddy's Trolley Troubles
  - Goin' to Heaven on a Mule
  - Buddy of the Apes
  - How Do I Know It's Sunday
  - Buddy's Bearcats
  - Why Do I Dream Those Dreams
  - The Girl at the Ironing Board
  - The Miller's Daughter
  - Shake Your Powder Puff
  - Buddy the Detective
  - Rhythm in the Bow
  - Buddy the Woodsman
  - Buddy's Circus
  - Those Beautiful Dames
  - Buddy's Adventures
  - Pop Goes Your Heart
  - Viva Buddy
  - Buddy the Dentist
- Terrytoons (1930–1964)
- Scrappy (1931–1941)
- Betty Boop (1932–1939)
  - She Wronged Him Right
  - Red Hot Mamma
  - Ha! Ha! Ha!
  - Betty in Blunderland
  - Betty Boop's Rise to Fame
  - Betty Boop's Trial
  - Betty Boop's Lifeguard
  - Poor Cinderella (first and only Betty Boop cartoon in colour)
  - There's Something About a Soldier
  - Betty Boop's Little Pal
  - Betty Boop's Prize Show
  - Keep in Style
  - When My Ship Comes In
- Popeye the Sailor (1933–1957)
- Willie Whopper (1933-1934)
- ComiColor Cartoons (1933–1936)
- Cubby Bear (1933-1934)
- The Little King (1933-1934)
- Happy Harmonies (1934–1938)
- Cartune Classics (1934–1935)
- Color Rhapsodies (1934–1949)
- Amos 'n' Andy (1934)

== Births ==
- January 6 – Sylvia Syms, English actress (d. 2023)
- January 8 – Roy Kinnear, English actor and comedian (d. 1988)
- January 11
  - Mitchell Ryan, American actor (d. 2022)
  - Sven Wollter, Swedish actor, writer, and political activist (d. 2020)
- January 12 - Bob Dishy, American actor
- January 13 - Rip Taylor, American comedian and actor (d. 2019)
- January 14
  - Richard Briers, English actor (d. 2013)
  - Priscilla Morgan, English actress
- January 19 – John Richardson, English actor (d. 2021)
- January 20 – Tom Baker, English actor and writer
- January 21
  - Audrey Dalton, Irish actress
  - Ann Wedgeworth, American character actress (d. 2017)
- January 22 – Bill Bixby, American actor (d. 1993)
- January 23 – Carmine Caridi, American actor (d. 2019)
- January 25 – Donald W. Ernst, American editor and producer (d. 2023)
- February 5 – Jimmy Flynn, American actor (d. 2022)
- February 10 – Tatyana Lolova, Bulgarian actress (d. 2021)
- February 11 – Tina Louise, American actress
- February 12
  - Annette Crosbie, Scottish actress
  - Valerio Ruggeri, Italian actor and voice actor (d. 2015)
- February 13 – George Segal, American actor and musician (d. 2021)
- February 14 – Florence Henderson, American actress (d. 2016)
- February 17
  - Alan Bates, English actor (d. 2003)
  - Barry Humphries, Australian comedian, actor, satirist, artist and author (d. 2023)
- February 21 – Rue McClanahan, American actress (d. 2010)
- February 25
  - Bernard Bresslaw, English actor and comedian (d. 1993)
  - Michael Fairman, American actor and writer
- March 4 – Anne Haney, American actress (d. 2001)
- March 5
  - James B. Sikking, American actor (d. 2024)
  - Nicholas Smith, English comedy actor (d. 2015)
- March 9
  - Del Close, American actor, writer and teacher (d. 1999)
  - Joyce Van Patten, American actress
- March 12 – Henryk Bista, Polish actor (d. 1997)
- March 20 - Peter Berling, German actor, producer and writer (d. 2017)
- March 22 – May Britt, Swedish actress (d. 2025)
- March 26
  - Alan Arkin, American actor (d. 2023)
  - Norman Reynolds, British production designer (d. 2023)
  - Joby Baker, American actor and painter (d. 2026)
- March 27 – Peter Schamoni, German director (d. 2011)
- March 30 – Count Prince Miller, Jamaican-British actor and musician (d. 2018)
- March 31
  - Richard Chamberlain, American actor and singer (d. 2025)
  - Shirley Jones, American singer and actress
- April 1 – Don Hastings, American actor
- April 2
  - Shirley Douglas, Canadian actress (d. 2020)
  - Brian Glover, English actor and writer (d. 1997)
- April 4 – Helen Hanft, American actress (d. 2013)
- April 7 – Ian Richardson, Scottish actor (d. 2007)
- April 14 – Josef Somr, Czech actor (d. 2022)
- April 16 – Robert Stigwood, Australian-born British producer (d. 2016)
- April 20 – Robert DoQui, American actor (d. 2008)
- April 24 – Shirley MacLaine, American actress
- April 25 – Denny Miller, American actor (d. 2014)
- May 1 – John Meillon, Australian character actor (d. 1989)
- May 3 – Ivan Andonov, Bulgarian film director (d. 2011)
- May 11 – André Gregory, French-born American director, writer and actor
- May 18 – Dwayne Hickman, American actor, producer and director (d. 2022)
- May 22 – Fred Roos, American film producer (d. 2024)
- May 24 – Kiril Gospodinov, Bulgarian actor (d. 2003)
- May 29 – Marina Cicogna, Italian producer (d. 2023)
- June 1
  - Pat Boone, American singer and actor
  - Peter Masterson, American actor, director, producer and writer (d. 2018)
- June 8 – Millicent Martin, English actress, singer and comedian
- June 15
  - Eileen Atkins, English actress
  - William Newman, American actor (d. 2015)
- June 16
  - Bill Cobbs, American actor (d. 2024)
  - Jane Henson, American puppeteer (d. 2013)
- June 21
  - Terrence Evans, American actor (d. 2015)
  - Maro Kontou, Greek actress (d. 2026)
  - Maggie Jones, English actress (d. 2009)
- June 26 – Josef Sommer, German-American actor
- July 1
  - Jamie Farr, American actor
  - Jean Marsh, English actress (d. 2025)
  - Ester Pajusoo, Estonian actress (d. 2026)
  - Sydney Pollack, American director, producer and actor (d. 2008)
- July 5 – Nikolay Binev, Bulgarian actor (d. 2003)
- July 8 – Marty Feldman, English comedian and actor (d. 1982)
- July 9 – John Clegg, English actor (d. 2024)
- July 10 – Jerry Nelson, American puppeteer (d. 2012)
- July 15 – Eva Krížiková, Slovak actress (d. 2020)
- July 22
  - Eric Del Castillo, Mexican actor
  - Louise Fletcher, American actress (d. 2022)
- July 23 – Silvana Bosi, Italian actress (d. 2020)
- July 26 – Ken Pogue, Canadian actor (d. 2015)
- July 29 – Sergio Fiorentini, Italian actor and voice actor (d. 2014)
- August 5 – Zakes Mokae, South African-American actor (d. 2009)
- August 7 – Marija Kohn, Croatian actress (d. 2018)
- August 14 – Vernon Dobtcheff, French-British actor
- August 16
  - Donnie Dunagan, American actor (d. 2026)
  - John Standing, British actor
- August 24 – Kenny Baker, English-born actor (d. 2016)
- August 30 – Helen Craig, English children's author and illustrator (Angelina Ballerina)
- September 11 – Ian Abercrombie, English-American actor and comedian (d. 2012)
- September 18 – Eddie Jones, American actor (d. 2019)
- September 20
  - Sophia Loren, Italian actress
  - Jeff Morris, American actor (d. 2004)
  - Karen Sharpe, American actress
- September 24 – Robert Lang, English actor (d. 2004)
- September 27
  - Wilford Brimley, American actor (d. 2020)
  - Claude Jarman Jr., American child actor (d. 2025)
- September 28 – Brigitte Bardot, French actress (d. 2025)
- September 29 – Alan Hopgood, Australian actor (d. 2022)
- October 13 – Savely Kramarov, Russian-American actor (d. 1995)
- October 15 – Peter Haskell, American actor (d. 2010)
- October 18 – Calvin Lockhart, Bahamian-American actor (d. 2007)
- October 19 – Glória Menezes, Brazilian actress (d. 2026)
- October 20 – Timothy West, English actor (d. 2024)
- October 28 – Charles A. Gargano, Italian-American actor
- October 31 – Suzanne Shepherd, American actress (d. 2023)
- November 5 - Victor Argo, American actor and musician (d. 2004)
- November 10
  - Richard Bradford, American actor (d. 2016)
  - Joanna Moore, American actress (d. 1997)
- November 11
  - Suzanne Lloyd, Canadian actress
  - Nadine Trintignant, French director, producer and screenwriter
- November 13 – Garry Marshall, American director, actor, producer, writer and voice artist (d. 2016)
- November 15 – Joanna Barnes, American actress (d. 2022)
- November 21
  - Jack Kehoe, American actor (d. 2020)
  - Laurence Luckinbill, American actor, playwright and director
- November 23
  - Robert Towne, American screenwriter and director (d. 2024)
  - Michael Wayne, American producer and actor (d. 2003)
- November 25 – Ann Davies, English actress (d. 2022)
- November 28 – Jaakko Pakkasvirta, Finnish film director and screenwriter (d. 2018)
- December 2 – Brian Phelan, Irish actor (d. 2024)
- December 9 – Judi Dench, English actress
- December 14 – Hal Williams, American actor (d. 2026)
- December 16 – Pete Schrum, American actor (d. 2003)
- December 26 – Matt Zimmerman, Canadian actor (d. 2022)
- December 27 – Christopher Benjamin, English actor (d. 2025)
- December 28
  - Maggie Smith, English actress (d. 2024)
  - David Warrilow, English actor (d. 1995)
- December 29 – Forugh Farrokhzad, Iranian poet and film director (d. 1967)
- December 30 – Russ Tamblyn, American actor and dancer

== Deaths ==
- March 21 – Lilyan Tashman, 34, American actress (cancer)
- May 31 – Lew Cody, 50, American actor
- June 8 – Dorothy Dell, 19, American actress (car crash)
- July 6 – Harry A. Pollard, 55, American actor & director
- July 28 – Marie Dressler, 65, Canadian-born American Academy Award winning actress
- September 18 – Marie Shotwell, 54, American actress
- December 20 – Frank Beal, 72, American actor

== Film debuts ==
- Eddie Acuff – Here Comes the Navy
- Philip Ahn – Desirable
- Fay Bainter – This Side of Heaven
- Willy Birgel – A Man Wants to Get to Germany
- Tommy Bond – Kid Millions
- Phyllis Brooks – One Exciting Adventure
- Candy Candido – Sadie McKee
- Leo G. Carroll – Sadie McKee
- Virginia Carroll – Sweet Adeline
- Lee J. Cobb – The Vanishing Shadow
- Zebedy Colt – Babes in Toyland
- Alec Craig – The Little Minister
- Friedl Czepa – Peter
- Esther Dale – Crime Without Passion
- Dan Duryea – The Tango on Broadway
- Alice Faye – George White's Scandals
- Jay C. Flippen – Million Dollar Ransom
- Dick Foran – Stand Up and Cheer!
- Rita Gould – Kiss and Make-Up
- Richard Greene – Sing As We Go
- Alec Guinness – Evensong
- Greta Gynt – The Song to Her
- Sara Haden – Spitfire
- Jonathan Hale – Housewife
- Bernadene Hayes – The Human Side
- Rita Hayworth – Cruz Diablo
- Kathleen Howard – Death Takes a Holiday
- Wilfrid Hyde-White – Josser on the Farm
- Zoe Incrocci – Everybody's Woman
- Sam Jaffe – The Scarlet Empress
- Mervyn Johns – Lady in Danger
- Dick Jones – Wonder Bar
- Dorothea Kent – George White's Scandals
- Bernard Lee – The Double Event
- Margaret Lockwood – Lorna Doone
- Louise Lorimer – I've Got Your Number
- Keye Luke – The Painted Veil
- Marion Martin – Crime Without Passion
- Mike Mazurki – Belle of the Nineties
- Ann Miller – Anne of Green Gables
- James Millican – Mills of the Gods
- George Murphy – Kid Millions
- Moroni Olsen – Death Takes a Holiday
- Robert Paige – You Can't Buy Everything
- Constance Purdy – Pursued
- Juanita Quigley – In Love with Life
- Anne Revere – Double Door
- Florence Rice – Fugitive Lady
- Rosalind Russell – Evelyn Prentice
- Ann Rutherford – Student Tour
- George Sanders – Love, Life and Laughter
- Robert Shayne – Keep 'Em Rolling
- Ann Sheridan – Search for Beauty
- Dorothy Short – Hollywood Party
- Hans Stiebner – The Grand Duke's Finances
- June Storey – Student Tour
- Frank Sully – Caravan
- William Tannen – Bright Eyes
- Robert Taylor – Handy Andy
- Lurene Tuttle – Stand Up and Cheer!
- Herb Vigran – Happy Landing
- Mona Washbourne – Evergreen
- Hilde Weissner – The Grand Duke's Finances
- Paula Wessely – Maskerade
- Helen Westley – Moulin Rouge
- Chill Wills – It's a Gift
- Ian Wolfe – The Barretts of Wimpole Street
- Donald Woods – As the Earth Turns
- Jane Wyatt – One More River
