= Liliom (disambiguation) =

Liliom is a 1909 play by Ferenc Molnár.

Liliom may also refer to following films based on the stage play:

- Liliom (1919 film), a film by Michael Curtiz
- Liliom (1930 film), a film by Frank Borzage
- Liliom (1934 film), a film by Fritz Lang

== See also ==
- Liliomfi, a 1954 Hungarian comedy film
