= List of fantasy films of the 1930s =

A list of fantasy films released in the 1930s.

== List ==
Title	Director	Cast	Country	Notes
1930
Liliom	Frank Borzage	Charles Farrell, Rose Hobart, H. B. Warner	United States	
Outward Bound	Robert Milton	Leslie Howard, Douglas Fairbanks Jr., Helen Chandler, Beryl Mercer	United States	
1931
A Connecticut Yankee	David Butler	Will Rogers, William Farnum, Myrna Loy, Maureen O'Sullivan	United States	
Alam Ara	Ardeshir Irani	Master Vithal, Zubeida, Prithviraj Kapoor, Jillo	India	First Indian sound film
1932
Das Blaue Licht	Leni Riefenstahl	Leni Riefenstahl, Beni Fuehrer, Max Holzboer	Germany	
Die Herrin von Atlantis	G. W. Pabst	Brigitte Helm	Germany; France	
1933
Alice in Wonderland	Norman Z. McLeod	Charlotte Henry, Richard Arlen, Roscoe Ates	United States	
Berkeley Square	Frank Lloyd	Leslie Howard, Heather Angel, Valerie Taylor	United Kingdom; United States	
King Kong	Merian C. Cooper, Ernest B. Schoedsack	Fay Wray, Robert Armstrong, Bruce Cabot	United States	
Turn Back the Clock	Edgar Selwyn	Lee Tracy, Mae Clarke, Otto Kruger	United States	
1934
Babes in Toyland	Gus Meins, Charles Rogers	Stan Laurel, Oliver Hardy, Charlotte Henry	United States	
Death Takes a Holiday	Mitchell Leisen	Fredric March, Evelyn Venable, Guy Standing	United States	
Liliom	Fritz Lang	Madeleine Ozeray, Charles Boyer, Pierre Alcover	France	
The Secret of the Loch	Milton Rosmer	Seymour Hicks, Nancy O'Neil, Gibson Gowland, Frederick Peisley	United Kingdom	
1935
Dante's Inferno	Harry Lachman	Spencer Tracy, Claire Trevor, Rita Hayworth	United States	
The Ghost Goes West	René Clair	Robert Donat, Jean Parker, Eugene Pallette	United Kingdom	
A Midsummer Night's Dream	William Dieterle, Max Reinhardt	Ian Hunter, James Cagney, Grant Mitchell, Olivia de Havilland	United States	
The New Gulliver	Aleksandr Ptushko	Vladimir Konstantinov, Ivan Yudin	Soviet Union	Mixed live action/stop motion film
Night Life of the Gods	Lowell Sherman	Alan Mowbray, Florine McKinney, Peggy Shannon	United States	
Peter Ibbetson	Henry Hathaway	Gary Cooper, Ann Harding, John Halliday	United States	
The Scoundrel	Ben Hecht, Charles MacArthur	Noël Coward, Julie Haydon, Stanley Ridges, Rosita Moreno	United States	
Scrooge	Henry Edwards	Seymour Hicks, Donald Calthrop, Robert Cochran	United Kingdom	
She	Lansing C. Holden, Irving Pichel	Helen Gahagan, Randolph Scott, Helen Mack, Nigel Bruce	United States	
1936
The Man Who Could Work Miracles	Lothar Mendes	Roland Young, Joan Gardner, Ralph Richardson	United Kingdom	
1937
The Dybbuk	Michał Waszyński	Abraham Morewski, Isaac Samberg, Moshe Lipman	Poland	
Lost Horizon	Frank Capra	Ronald Colman, Edward Everett Horton, H. B. Warner	United States	
Snow White and the Seven Dwarfs	Various Directors for Walt Disney		United States	Animated film
Topper	Norman Z. McLeod	Cary Grant, Constance Bennett, Billie Burke	United States	
1938
A Christmas Carol	Edwin L. Marin	Reginald Owen, Gene Lockhart, Kathleen Lockhart, Terry Kilburn	United States	
Wish upon a Pike	Aleksandr Rou	Pyotr Savin, Georgy Millyar	Soviet Union	
1939
Golden Key	Aleksandr Ptushko	Sergey Martinson	Soviet Union	A mixed life action and stop motion animation film, based on Buratino
Gulliver's Travels	Dave Fleischer	Jessica Dragonette, Lanny Ross	United States	Animated film
Vasilisa the Beautiful	Aleksandr Rou	Georgiy Millyar, Valentina Storogozhskaya, Sergei Stolyarov, Lev Potyomkin	Soviet Union	
The Wizard of Oz	Victor Fleming	Judy Garland, Frank Morgan, Ray Bolger, Bert Lahr	United States	
