= Ferragus =

Ferragus may refer to:

- Ferragut, a Saracen paladin (in some texts a giant) in the Historia Caroli Magni
- Ferragus, a Saracen giant of Portugal in the medieval romance Valentine and Orson
- Ferragus: Chief of the Devorants, a novel by Honoré de Balzac, also a character in the novel
- Louis Ulbach (1822-89), French author, used "Ferragus" as a pen-name.
- Ferragus (film), a 1923 French silent film directed by Gaston Ravel
- Faraj ben Salim, 13th century Sicilian-Jewish physician and translator

== See also ==
- Farragus (disambiguation)
- Fergus (name)
- Farragut (disambiguation)
