= The Candy House =

The Candy House may refer to:

- The Candy House (film), a 1934 short animated film
- The Candy House (novel), a 2022 novel by Jennifer Egan
- Mithayi Mane (also Candy House), a 2005 Indian film by Aarathi
