= Madame Récamier (1928 film) =

1928 film

- Directed by: Tony Lekain; Gaston Ravel
- Written by: Edouard Herriot
- Starring: Marie Bell; Françoise Rosay; Edmond Van Daële
- Production companies: Franco Films; Le Film d'Art
- Release date: 26 June 1928
- Country: France
- Languages: Silent; French intertitles

Madame Récamier is a 1928 French silent historical film directed by Tony Lekain and Gaston Ravel and starring Marie Bell, Françoise Rosay, and Edmond Van Daële. The film portrays the life of Juliette Récamier, a French society figure of the Napoleonic Era. She was also the subject of a 1920 German film of the same name.

== Cast ==
- Marie Bell
- Françoise Rosay
- Edmond Van Daële
- François Rozet
- Andrée Brabant
- Nelly Cormon
- Roberte Cusey
- Jeanne de Balzac
- Jean Debucourt
- Émile Drain as Napoleon
- Mona Goya
- Charles Le Bargy
- Desdemona Mazza
- Genica Missirio
- Madeleine Rodrigue
- Victor Vina

== Bibliography ==
- Klossner, Michael. The Europe of 1500-1815 on Film and Television: A Worldwide Filmography of Over 2550 Works, 1895 Through 2000. McFarland, 2002.
