= Farragus =

Farragus may refer to:

- Gastromyzon farragus, fish species
- Professor Farragus, a mad scientist from End of the World at Eight O'Clock by Stanisław Lem
- Faraj ben Salim, 13th century Sicilian-Jewish physician and translator
- An occasional spelling for Ferragus, by Honoré de Balzac in old English translations

== See also ==
- Ferragus (disambiguation)
- Farragut (disambiguation)
