= There's Something About a Soldier =

There's Something About a Soldier could refer to:

- "There's Something About a Soldier", a 1933 song by Noel Gay
- There's Something About a Soldier (1934 film), an American animated Betty Boop short film
- There's Something About a Soldier (1943 film), an American drama film directed by Alfred E. Green
- There's Something About a Soldier, a 1943 Color Rhapsody directed by Alec Geiss
- "There's Something About a Soldier", a 1996 episode of the British television series Goodnight Sweetheart
