= The Queen's Necklace (1929 film) =

1929 film

- Directed by: Tony Lekain; Gaston Ravel
- Written by: Alexandre Dumas (novel); Frantz Funck-Brentano
- Starring: Marcelle Chantal; Georges Lannes; Diana Karenne
- Cinematography: Jean Bachelet; Gustavo Kottula; Émile Pierre
- Edited by: Kratach
- Music by: Febvre-Longeray; André Roubaud
- Production company: Gaumont
- Distributed by: Gaumont (France); UFA (Germany)
- Release date: 22 October 1929
- Country: France
- Languages: Sound (Synchronized); French Intertitles

The Queen's Necklace (French: Le collier de la reine) is a 1929 synchronized sound French historical drama film directed by Tony Lekain and Gaston Ravel and starring Marcelle Chantal, Georges Lannes and Diana Karenne. While the film has no audible dialog, it was released with a synchronized musical score with sound effects. The film is an adaptation of Alexandre Dumas's novel The Queen's Necklace which portrays the Affair of the Diamond Necklace which occurred before the French Revolution. The film's art direction was by Lucien Carré. The film was made and distributed by Gaumont. In Germany it was released by the major studio UFA.

Like many films from the early sound era, the film was shot as a silent film and then was synchronized with a musical score and sound effect soundtrack.

== Cast ==
- Marcelle Chantal as La comtesse de la Motte
- Georges Lannes as Le cardinal de Rohan
- Diana Karenne as Marie-Antoinette / Oliva
- Jeanne Evrard as La princesse de Lamballe
- Jean Weber as Le chevalier Réteau de Villette
- Renée Parme as Madame Élisabeth
- Fernand Fabre as Le comte de La Motte
- Harry Harment as Louis XVI
- Odette Talazac as Madame de Misezy
- Jules Mondos as Le joaillier
- Gaston Mauger as Monsieur de Crosne
- Paul Sato as Toussaint de Beauvire
- Henri Lesieur as L'autre joaillier
- Ady Cresso as Madame Vigée-Lebrun
- Marc Dantzer
- Jean Fay
- Marco Monti
- Gilberte Savary
- Emilio Vardannes

== See also ==
- List of early sound feature films (1926–1929)

== Bibliography ==
- Klossner, Michael. The Europe of 1500-1815 on Film and Television: A Worldwide Filmography of Over 2550 Works, 1895 Through 2000. McFarland, 2002.
