= White Nights in Saint Petersburg =

1938 film

- Directed by: Jean Dréville
- Written by: André Legrand
- Based on: The Kreutzer Sonata by Leo Tolstoy
- Produced by: Jack Forrester; André Parant
- Starring: Gaby Morlay; Jean Yonnel; Pierre Renoir
- Cinematography: Michel Kelber
- Edited by: Raymond Leboursier
- Music by: Adolphe Borchard
- Production company: Forrester-Parant Productions
- Distributed by: Forrester-Parant Productions
- Release date: 9 March 1938
- Running time: 97 minutes
- Country: France
- Language: French

White Nights in Saint Petersburg (French: Les nuits blanches de Saint-Pétersbourg) is a 1938 French drama film directed by Jean Dréville and starring Gaby Morlay, Jean Yonnel and Pierre Renoir. It is an adaptation of the 1889 novella The Kreutzer Sonata by Leo Tolstoy. It is sometimes known by this title, and should not be confused with the 1937 German film The Kreutzer Sonata directed by Veit Harlan. The film's sets were designed by the art directors Lucien Carré, Alexandre Lochakoff and Vladimir Meingard while the costume design was overseen by Boris Bilinsky.

== Cast ==
- Gaby Morlay as Helene Voronine
- Jean Yonnel as Dimitri Pozdnychef
- Jacques Erwin as Toukatchewsky
- Pierre Renoir as Ivan Borowsky
- Edmonde Guy as Sonia Borowsky
- Clara Darcey-Roche as La mère de Pozdnycheff
- Annie Rozanne as Katia Voronine
- André Bervil as Igor Petrovich
- Gisèle Gire as La fleuriste
- Georges Paulais as Gouretzki
- André Nox as Le directeur
- Marguerite de Morlaye as Une admiratrice
- Louis Salou as Michel
- Charles Léger as Le domestique
- Jean-Pierre Thisse as Le petit Vassia

== Bibliography ==
- Bessy, Maurice & Chirat, Raymond. Histoire du cinéma français: encyclopédie des films, Volume 2. Pygmalion, 1986.
- Crisp, Colin. Genre, Myth and Convention in the French Cinema, 1929-1939. Indiana University Press, 2002.
- Goble, Alan. The Complete Index to Literary Sources in Film. Walter de Gruyter, 1999.
- Rège, Philippe. Encyclopedia of French Film Directors, Volume 1. Scarecrow Press, 2009.
