= Liliom (1930 film) =

1930 film

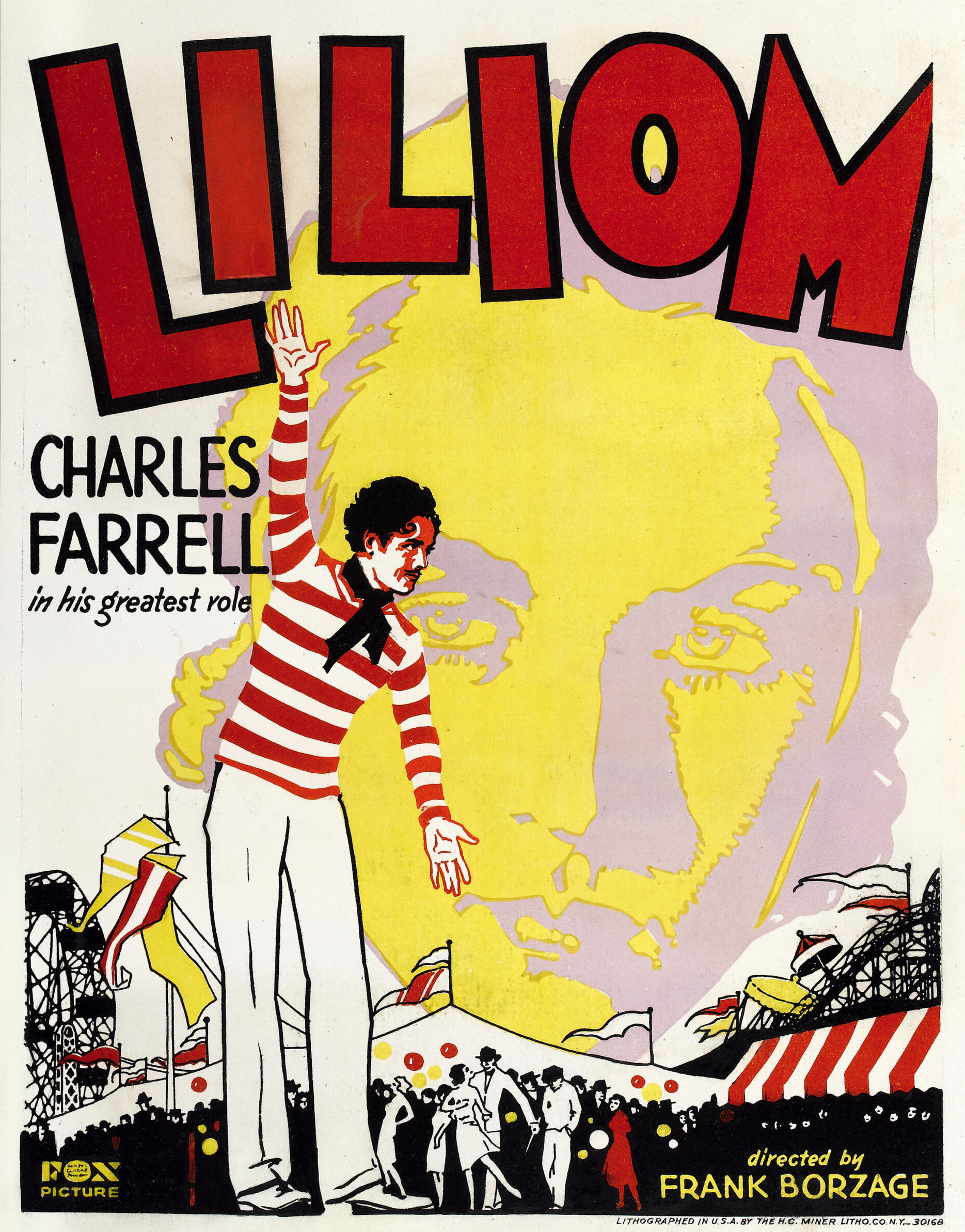
- Window card poster
- Directed by: Frank Borzage
- Screenplay by: S. N. Behrman; Sonya Levien; Ferenc Molnár (play)
- Produced by: William Fox
- Starring: Charles Farrell; Rose Hobart; H. B. Warner; Lee Tracy
- Cinematography: Chester A. Lyons
- Edited by: Margaret Clancey
- Music by: Richard Fall
- Production company: Fox Film Corporation
- Distributed by: Fox Film Corporation
- Release date: October 5, 1930
- Running time: 94 minutes
- Country: United States
- Language: English

Liliom is a 1930 American pre-Code drama film directed by Frank Borzage and written by S. N. Behrman and Sonya Levien. The film stars Charles Farrell, Rose Hobart, Estelle Taylor, H. B. Warner, Lee Tracy and Walter Abel. It was an adaptation of the 1909 play of the same name, serving as the first sound version of the film and the first of two sound adaptations of the play in the 1930s, with a 1934 adaptation being directed by Fritz Lang. The film was released on October 5, 1930, by Fox Film Corporation, who also handled the 1934 film. Alongside Just Imagine, also released by Fox, this was one of the first films to employ rear projection, which is done during a train sequence.

The film was rejected by the British Board of Film Censors "on the ground that its treatment of sacred subjects is irreverent, if not actually blasphemous." It was eventually passed with a PG certificate in 2010.

== Plot ==
Liliom (1930)

Liliom, a merry-go-round barker at a Budapest amusement park, becomes enamored of Julie, a servant girl, and though under the influence of Madame Muskat, a sideshow entrepreneur, he marries the girl. Three months pass, with Julie living with her aunt Hulda and Liliom, who left the carousel and doesn't have a job. Although he has not been a good provider, Liliom is spurred into action by the discovery that his wife is pregnant and eventually is influenced by his friend Buzzard, to rob a bank cashier so that he can take Julie to America.

He dies when he stabs himself rather than get caught by the police. When on the train of the afterlife, he is sent to Hell for ten years before he can get a second chance. He comes back for a day, sees his child, then gets annoyed at not being let in the house before he hits her. However, the hit feels like a kiss to the daughter, which means that the memory of Liliom still lives.

== Cast ==
- Charles Farrell as Liliom
- Rose Hobart as Julie
- Estelle Taylor as Madame Muscat
- H. B. Warner as Chief Magistrate
- Lee Tracy as The Buzzard
- Walter Abel as Carpenter
- Mildred Van Dorn as Marie
- Guinn "Big Boy" Williams as Hollinger
- Lillian Elliott as Aunt Hulda
- Anne Shirley as Louise
- Bert Roach as Wolf
- James A. Marcus as Linzman
- Harvey Clark as Angel Gabriel
- Oscar Apfel as Stefen Kadar (uncredited)

== See also ==
- List of films about angels
