= Farragut =

Farragut may refer to:

== People ==
- David Farragut (1801–1870), American admiral
- George Farragut (1755–1817), American Revolutionary War naval officer, father of David Farragut
- Ken Farragut (1928-2014), American National Football League player
- Faraj ben Salim, also known as Farragut of Girgenti, 13th century Sicilian-Jewish physician and translator
- Pilar Fuertes Ferragut (1962–2012), Spanish diplomat

== Places ==
- Farragut, Iowa, a city
- Farragut, Tennessee, a town
- Farragut, Brooklyn, a neighborhood
- Farragut Square in Washington, D.C.
- Farragut North station in Washington, D.C.
- Farragut West station in Washington, D.C.
- Farragut State Park, Idaho
- Farragut Naval Training Station, Bayview, Idaho, a former US Navy training center
- Farragut Wildlife Management Area, Idaho

== Ships ==
- Farragut-class destroyer (disambiguation)
  - Farragut-class destroyer (1934)
  - Farragut-class destroyer (1958)
- USS Farragut, various United States Navy ships

== Schools ==
- Farragut Career Academy, a public high school in Chicago, Illinois
- Farragut High School, Farragut, Tennessee
- David Glasgow Farragut High School, Naval Station Rota, Spain

== See also ==
- Ferragut
- Ferragus (disambiguation)
- Farragus (disambiguation)
