= Marie Bell =

French tragedian, comic actor and stage director

- Born: Marie-Jeanne Bellon-Downey; 23 December 1900; Bègles, France
- Died: 14 August 1985 (aged 84); Neuilly-sur-Seine, Hauts-de-Seine, France
- Resting place: Monaco Cemetery
- Occupations: Tragedian, comic actor, stage director
- Spouse: Jean Chevrier

Marie Bell (23 December 1900 – 14 August 1985), born Marie-Jeanne Bellon-Downey, was a French tragedian, comic actor and stage director. She was the director of the Théâtre du Gymnase in Paris from 1962 onwards, and this theatre now bears her name.

== Early life ==
Marie Bell was born on 23 December 1900 in Bègles near Bordeaux (France). With her Irish father, she spent her childhood between Bordeaux and England.

== Career ==
Bell was a classical actress. She also appeared in avant-garde theatre, Jean Genet in particular.

Her interpretation of the role of Phèdre is highly noted : "Voir Marie Bell dans Phèdre est une chance unique pour quiconque veut savoir ce qu'est le génie français." André Malraux

During the German Occupation of France (1940–1944), she participated in the French resistance as one of nine directors of the Front national du théâtre. She was awarded the decoration of the Légion d'honneur by President Charles de Gaulle.

== Personal life ==
Bell married Jean Chevrier, who was also an actor.

== Death ==
Bell died on 14 August 1985 in Neuilly-sur-Seine, Hauts-de-Seine, France. She was buried alongside her husband Jean Chevrier at the Monaco Cemetery not far from Josephine Baker.

== Filmography ==
- Paris (dir. René Hervil, 1924), as Marthe de Lignières
- Madame Récamier (dir. Tony Lekain and Gaston Ravel, 1928), as Juliette Récamier
- The Farewell Waltz (dir. Henry Roussel, 1928), as Maria Wodzińska
- Figaro (dir. Tony Lekain and Gaston Ravel, 1929), as Suzanne
- La nuit est à nous (The Night Is Ours) (dir. Carl Froelich and Henry Roussel, 1930), as Bettine de Barsac
- Le Joker (dir. Erich Waschneck, 1930), as Harriet Williams
- L'Homme qui assassina (dir. Curtis Bernhardt and Jean Tarride, 1931), as Lady Falkland
- La Folle Aventure (dir. Carl Froelich and André-Paul Antoine, 1931), as Nelly Irwin
- Luck (dir. René Guissart, 1931), as Tania Balieff
- The Man with the Hispano (dir. Jean Epstein, 1933), as Stéphane Oswill
- The Princess's Whim (dir. Karl Hartl and Henri-Georges Clouzot, 1934), as Isabelle
- Fedora (dir. Louis J. Gasnier, 1934), as Fedora
- Le Grand Jeu (dir. Jacques Feyder, 1934), as Florence / Irma
- Poliche (dir. Abel Gance, 1934), as Rosine
- Fiordalisi d'oro (dir. Giovacchino Forzano, 1935), as Anne-Marie de Beaulieu
  - Sous la terreur (dir. Giovacchino Forzano and Marcel Cravenne, 1936), as Anne-Marie de Beaulieu
- Story of a Poor Young Man (dir. Abel Gance, 1936), as Marguerite
- La Garçonne (dir. Jean de Limur, 1936), as Monique Lerbier – la garçonne
- Temptation (dir. Pierre Caron, 1936), as Irène de Bergue
- When Midnight Strikes (dir. Léo Joannon, 1936), as Mattia
- Les Demi-vierges (dir. Pierre Caron, 1936), as Maud de Rouvre
- Blanchette (dir. Pierre Caron, 1937), as Blanchette Rousset
- Pantins d'amour (dir. Walter Kapps, 1937), as Renée Morhange
- Un carnet de bal (Life Dances On) (dir. Julien Duvivier, 1937), as Christine Surgère
- Légions d'honneur (dir. Maurice Gleize, 1938), de Simone
- La Glu (dir. Jean Choux, 1938), as Fernande "La Glu"
- Noix de coco (Cocoanut) (dir. Jean Boyer, 1939), as Caroline
- The Phantom Carriage (dir. Julien Duvivier, 1939), as Sœur Maria
- Those of the Sky (dir. Yvan Noé, 1941), as Hélène
- Private Life (dir. Walter Kapps, 1942), as Florence
- Le colonel Chabert (dir. René Le Hénaff, 1943), as Comtesse Rosine Ferraud
- Il gattopardo (The Leopard) (dir. Luchino Visconti, 1963), uncredited
- La Bonne Soupe (dir. Robert Thomas, 1964), as Marie-Paule
- Vaghe stelle dell'Orsa (Sandra) (dir. Luchino Visconti, 1965), as Sandra's mother
- Hotel Paradiso (dir. Peter Glenville, 1966), as La Grande Antoinette
- Phèdre (dir. Pierre Jourdan, 1968), as Phèdre
- Closed Shutters (dir. Jean-Claude Brialy, 1973), as Aurore
