= Figaro (film) =

1929 film

- Directed by: Tony Lekain; Gaston Ravel
- Written by: Beaumarchais (play); Tony Lekain; Gaston Ravel
- Starring: Ernst Van Duren; Arlette Marchal; Marie Bell
- Cinematography: Albert Duverger
- Production company: Franco Films
- Release date: 20 December 1929
- Running time: 120 minutes
- Country: France
- Languages: Silent; French intertitles

Figaro (1929)

Figaro is a 1929 French silent historical comedy film directed by Tony Lekain and Gaston Ravel and starring Ernst Van Duren, Arlette Marchal and Marie Bell. It is an adaptation of the 1778 Beaumarchais play The Marriage of Figaro, with material also used from its two sequels. It was released in 1929 in the US as a silent film, then reissued there in 1932 with an added music track, recorded by SpA Bixiophone, under the title Il Barbiere di Siviglia.

== Cast ==
- Ernst Van Duren as Figaro
- Arlette Marchal as Rosine
- Marie Bell as Suzanne
- Léon Belières as Batholo
- José Davert as Basile
- Tony D'Algy as Le Comte Almaviva
- Jean Weber as Chérubin
- Odette Talazac as Marceline
- Genica Missirio as Bogaerts
- Roland Caillaux as Grippe-Soleil

== Bibliography ==
- Waldman, Harry & Slide, Anthony. Hollywood and the Foreign Touch: A Dictionary of Foreign Filmmakers and Their Films from America, 1910-1995. Scarecrow Press, 1996.
