= Fanatisme =

1934 film

- Directed by: Tony Lekain; Gaston Ravel
- Written by: Max Maurey (novel); Henry d'Erlanger
- Starring: Pola Negri; Jean Yonnel; Lucien Rozenberg
- Cinematography: Georges Raulet
- Music by: Georges Célérier; Jean Tranchant
- Production company: Via Films
- Distributed by: Pathé Consortium Cinéma
- Release date: 1 June 1934
- Running time: 80 minutes
- Country: France
- Language: French

Fanatisme is a 1934 French historical drama film directed by Tony Lekain and Gaston Ravel and starring Pola Negri, Jean Yonnel and Lucien Rozenberg. The film's sets were designed by the art director Claude Bouxin.

== Cast ==
- Pola Negri as Rosine Savelli
- Jean Yonnel as Le prince de Valnéro
- Lucien Rozenberg as Napoleon III
- Andrée Lafayette as L'impératrice Eugénie
- Georges Flateau as Ardiotti
- Pierre Richard-Willm as Marcel Besnard
- Louisa de Mornand as La marquise de Contadès
- Lilian Greuze as La comtesse Walewska
- William Aguet as Le chambellan
- Pierre Juvenet as Le duc de Morny
- Gil Clary as La princesse Mathilde
- Christian Argentin as Piétri

== Bibliography ==
- Mariusz Kotowski. Pola Negri: Hollywood's First Femme Fatale. University Press of Kentucky, 2014.
