= Jean Yonnel =

Romanian-born French actor

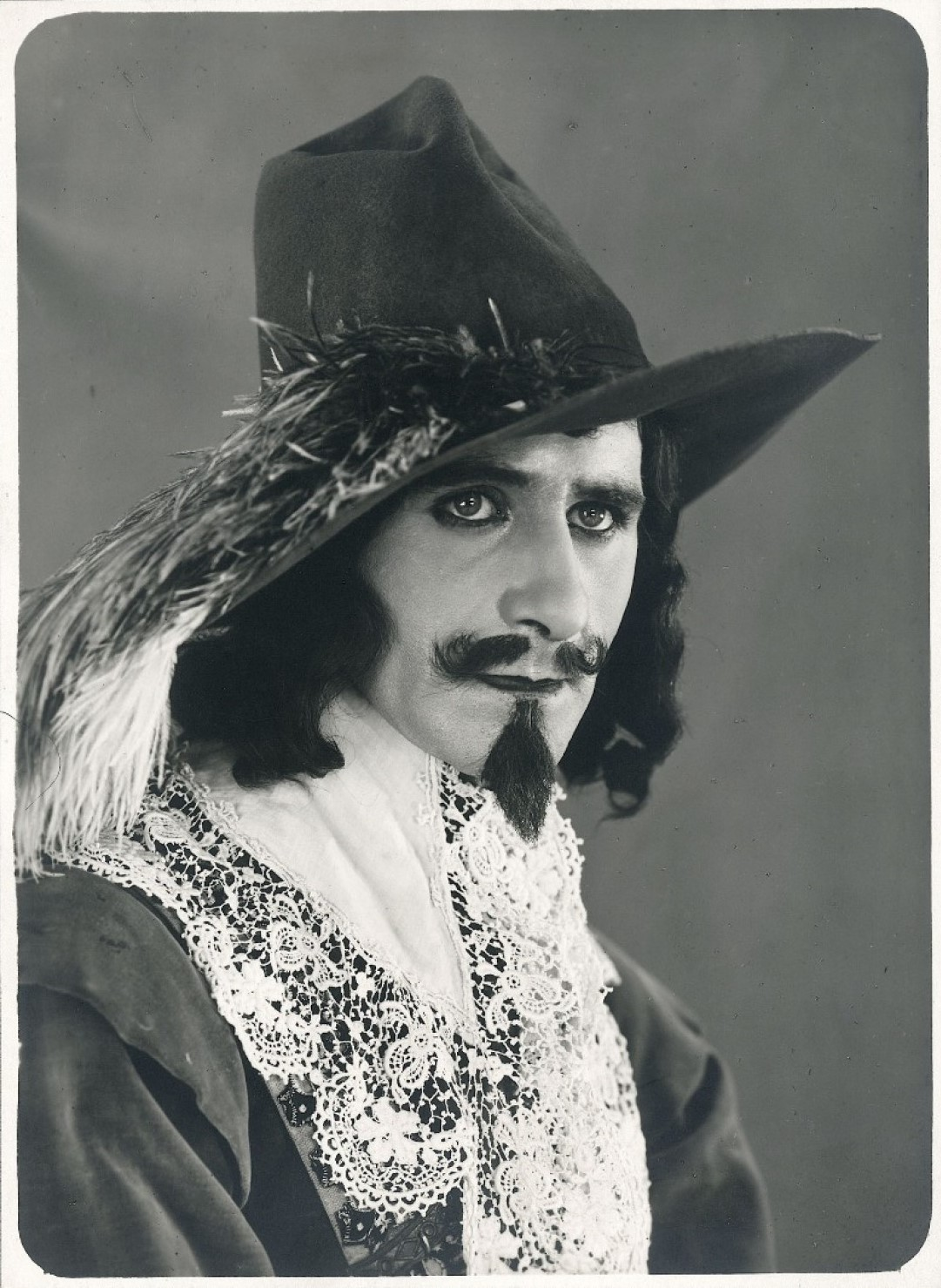
Jean Yonnel

Jean Yonnel (21 July 1891 – 17 August 1968) was a Romanian-born French actor.

Yonnel was born in Bucharest, Romania as Jean-Estève Schachmann and began his film career in France in the 1910s. Some of his notable performance were in Obsession (1933), Amok (1934), Fanatisme (1934), White Nights of St. Petersburg (1937), The Imperial Tragedy (1939) and A Funny Parishioner (1963). Yonnel died in Paris in 1968.

== Filmography ==
Year	Title	Role	Director	Notes
1915	Strass et Compagnie		Abel Gance	
1918	La flamme cachée		Roger Lion and Musidora	
1922	Vingt ans après	D'Artagnan	Henri Diamant-Berger	
1925	Jack	Le poète d'Argenteuil	Robert Saidreau	
1934	Fanatisme	Le prince de Valnéro	Gaston Ravel and Tony Lekain	
1934	Amok	Holk	Fedor Ozep	
1935	Kœnigsmark	Grand Duke Rudolph	Maurice Tourneur	
1936	The Call of Silence	Charles de Foucauld	Léon Poirier	
1937	Boissière	Hector Le Barois	Fernand Rivers	
1938	Rasputin		Marcel L'Herbier	Uncredited
1938	White Nights in Saint Petersburg	Dimitri Pozdnychef	Jean Dréville	
1939	Les 3 tambours	L'abbé Pessonneau	Maurice de Canonge	
1945	Blind Desire	Jérôme Noblet	Jean Delannoy	
1946	Special Mission	Jean Sartène - un industriel du pétrole patriote	Maurice de Canonge	
1947	L'apocalisse		Giuseppe Maria Scotese	
1947	Les Requins de Gibraltar		Emil Edwin Reinert	
1950	Le grand rendez-vous	Le baron Darvey	Jean Dréville	
1952	Trial at the Vatican	L'Abbé Faure - l'aumonier des prisons	André Haguet	
1953	Soyez les bienvenus	Jean Yonnel	Pierre-Louis	Uncredited
1955	Marianne of My Youth	Der Freiherr	Julien Duvivier	
1961	Captain Fracasse	the Prince of Moussy	Pierre Gaspard-Huit	
1963	Un drôle de paroissien	Monsieur Mattieu Lachesnaye, Georges' father	Jean-Pierre Mocky	
1966	La dama del alba	Abuelo	Francisco Rovira Beleta	(final film role)
