= Ferragus: Chief of the Devorants =

1833 novel by Honoré de Balzac

Ferragus
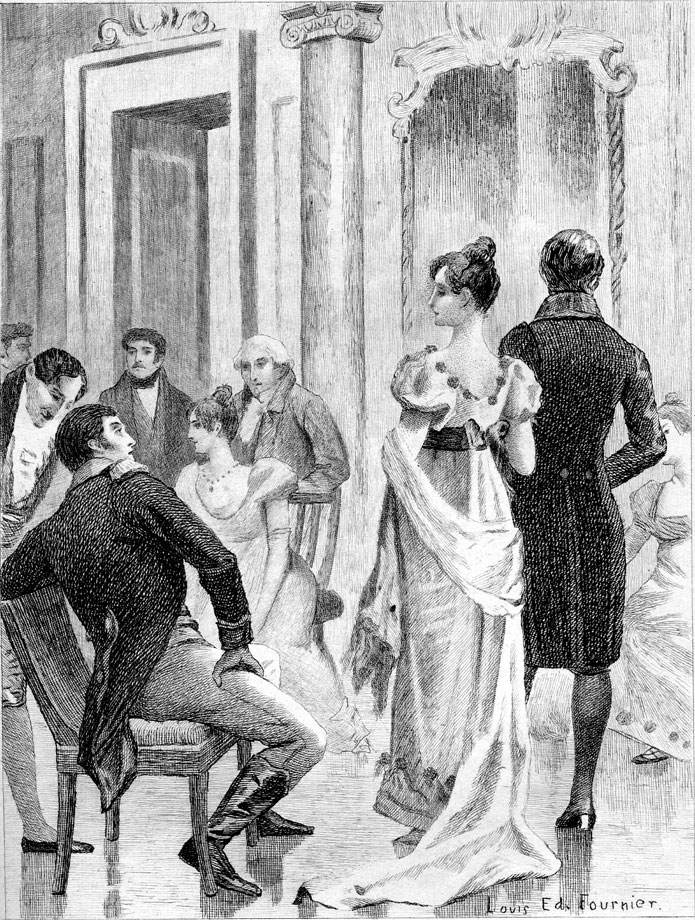
- Title page of Ferragus (1833)
- Author: Honoré de Balzac
- Original title: Ferragus, chef des Dévorants
- Working title: Ferragus, Chief of the Devorants
- Language: French
- Series: La Comédie humaine
- Publication date: 1833
- Publication place: Paris, France
- Text: Ferragus at Wikisource

Ferragus (Full title French: Ferragus, chef des Dévorants; English: Ferragus, Chief of the Devorants) is an 1833 novel by French author Honoré de Balzac (1799–1850), and included in the Scènes de la vie parisienne ('Scenes from Parisian life') section of his novel sequence La Comédie humaine. It is part of his trilogy Histoire des treize: Ferragus is the first part, the second is La Duchesse de Langeais, and the third is The Girl with the Golden Eyes. Ferragus first appeared in the Revue de Paris and was then published by the firm Charles-Béchet.

== Plot ==
The novel is set around the year 1820. Auguste de Maulincour, a young cavalry officer, walking in a Parisian district of ill repute, sees from afar a young married woman, Clemence, with whom he is secretly in love. He sees her enter a house of ill repute. The young married woman is widely recognised in Parisian society as a paragon of marital virtue—what is her secret? Auguste decides to spy on the woman to find out.

Later, by coincidence, Auguste meets a man named Ferragus who lives in the very same house that Clemence has been secretly visiting. He speaks to Ferragus of Clemence's double life. In the days that follow, Auguste uncovers the secrets of powerful and mysterious people and escapes three assassination attempts. Auguste next reveals Clemence's secret to her husband, Jules Desmarets, a very rich stockbroker. Jules becomes suspicious and spies on Ferragus, who he discovers is none other than Clemence's father.

Ultimately, Clemence, whose love was pure, dies of a broken heart, Auguste is poisoned by Ferragus, Jules loses all interest in life and Ferragus is reduced to a sad, ruined old man watching games of Boule on the outskirts of Paris.

It is revealed that Ferragus used to be a rich, handsome boy, a member of the Order of Devorants, who was imprisoned in 1806. He had escaped imprisonment and lived in Paris under various names and disguises. In 1815, Ferragus became involved in several sordid businesses.

Ferragus is, according to ancient custom, a name taken by the chief or Grand Master of the Devorants. On the day of their election these chiefs continue whichever of the dynasties of their Order they are most in sympathy with, precisely as the Popes do, on their accession, in connection with pontifical dynasties. Thus the Devorants have "Trempe-la Soupe IX," "Ferragus XXII," "Tutanus XIII," "Masche-Fer IV," just as the Church has Clement XIV, Gregory VII, Julius II, Alexander VI, etc. Now, then, who are the Devorants? "Devorant" is the name of one of those tribes of "Companions" that issued in ancient times from the great mystical association formed among the workers of Christianity to rebuild the temple at Jerusalem.

— Honoré de Balzac, Ferragus, Chief of the Devorants

The novel has a tragic theme, with the death of both Auguste and Clemence, as well as the despair of Jules and the physical decrepitude of Ferragus.

== Film versions ==
- Ferragus (1910) by André Calmettes
- Ferragus (1920) by Giovanni Enrico Vidali
- Ferragus (1923) by Gaston Ravel
- Die Dreizehn ('The Thirteen'; 1918) by Alfred Halm
