= Ferragus (film) =

1923 film

- Directed by: Gaston Ravel
- Written by: Arthur Bernède
- Based on: Ferragus by Honoré de Balzac
- Starring: René Navarre; Elmire Vautier; Stewart Rome
- Cinematography: Marcel Grimault
- Production company: Films Rene Navarre
- Distributed by: Etablissements E. Giraud
- Release date: 30 November 1923
- Running time: 110 minutes
- Country: France
- Languages: Silent; French intertitles

Ferragus is a 1923 French silent drama film directed by Gaston Ravel and starring René Navarre, Elmire Vautier and Stewart Rome. It is an adaptation of the 1833 novel of the same title by Honoré de Balzac. The film's sets were designed by the art director Tony Lekain.

== Cast ==
- René Navarre as Ferragus
- Elmire Vautier as Clémence Desmarets
- Stewart Rome as Desmarets
- Lucien Dalsace as Maulincourt
- Tony Lekain as Mendiant

== Bibliography ==
- Goble, Alan. The Complete Index to Literary Sources in Film. Walter de Gruyter, 1999.
- Rège, Philippe. Encyclopedia of French Film Directors, Volume 1. Scarecrow Press, 2009.
