= Tony Lekain =

French film director (1888–1966)

- Born: Tony Théodore Weill; 5 November 1888; Paris
- Died: 26 December 1966 (aged 78); Cannes
- Occupation: Film director
- Years active: 1920s – 1930s

Tony Lekain, real name Tony Théodore Weill, (5 November 1888 – 26 December 1966) was a French film director, who was active during the 1920s and 1930s.

== Selected filmography ==
- Ferragus (1923)
- 1926: Le Fauteuil 47 with Gaston Ravel
- 1927: Le Bonheur du jour with Gaston Ravel
- 1929: Figaro, with Gaston Ravel
- 1929: The Queen's Necklace, with Gaston Ravel
- 1932: Monsieur de Pourceaugnac, with Gaston Ravel
- 1934: The Rosary, with Gaston Ravel, after the novel by Florence L. Barclay.
- 1934: Fanatisme, with Gaston Revel
