= Le Roi des Champs-Élysées =

- Theatrical release poster
- Directed by: Max Nosseck
- Written by: Arnold Lippschitz; Yves Mirande
- Starring: Buster Keaton; Raymond Blot; Lucien Callamand; Paul Clerget; Colette Darfeuil; Paulette Dubost
- Cinematography: Robert Lefebvre
- Edited by: Jean Delannoy
- Music by: Joe Hajos
- Distributed by: Paramount Pictures (France)
- Release date: 11 December 1934
- Running time: 70 minutes
- Country: France
- Language: French

Le Roi des Champs-Élysées is a 1934 French comedy starring Buster Keaton. This French-made film has Keaton playing two roles, as an aspiring actor, and as an American gangster. A closing gag has the typically deadpan Keaton breaking out into a big grin after being kissed.

Almost all of Keaton's dialogue, in French, is dubbed. The film was never theatrically released in the United States.

== See also ==
- 1934 in film
