= Managed Money =

1934 film by Charles Lamont

- Directed by: Charles Lamont
- Starring: Shirley Temple; Frank Coghlan Jr. Harry Myers
- Distributed by: Educational Films Corporation of America
- Release date: February 25, 1934
- Running time: 21 minutes
- Country: United States
- Language: English

Managed Money is a 1934 short comedy film directed by Charles Lamont. The film stars Frank Coghlan Jr. and Shirley Temple. It was also known as Frolics of Youth and Measured Money. This was the second film in which Temple starred as Mary Lou.

== Plot ==
Sonny and Sid are prospecting for gold to pay for their military academy education. Sonny's sister, Mary Lou stows away in the back of their car. Eventually, they meet an inventor who helps them financially.

== See also ==
- Shirley Temple filmography
