= The Candy House (film) =

1934 film

- Directed by: Walter Lantz
- Story by: Walter Lantz; Victor McLeod
- Produced by: Walter Lantz
- Starring: The Rhythmettes; Bernice Hansen; Fred Avery
- Music by: James Dietrich
- Animation by: Manuel Moreno; Lester Kline; Fred Kopietz; George Grandpre; Ernest Smyth
- Color process: Black and white
- Production company: Walter Lantz Productions
- Distributed by: Universal Pictures
- Release date: January 15, 1934
- Running time: 8:37
- Language: English

The Candy House is a 1934 short animated film by Walter Lantz Productions featuring Oswald the Lucky Rabbit. The film is an adaptation of the fairy tale Hansel and Gretel by the Brothers Grimm and is one of the few Oswald shorts in which he plays a different character.

== Plot ==
Hansel (Oswald the Lucky Rabbit) and Gretel are two simple children who live with their father and stepmother. Although they have little resources, they are happy. One day the stepmother is irritated by the food shortage, and makes the children go to bed without dinner. When the children protest, the stepmother replies, "I should worry! Nuts to you!" The stepmother then talks to the father about taking the children deep in the forest to be abandoned. The father is too timid to argue. Hansel and Gretel overhear their conversation.

The next day, the stepmother takes the children into the forest. Hansel picks up a sunflower, and drops its seeds on the way to mark their path. Eventually the stepmother tells the children cover their eyes, pretending she has a surprise for them, and abandons them. Hansel is optimistic that he and his sister will have no trouble getting home, but to his dismay, discovers that forest birds have eaten the sunflower seeds.

Lost in the forest, Hansel and Gretel come across a cottage made of candy. They eat pieces of the house. A voice inside invites them to come in. Upon entry, the two little rabbits are met by a hag who grabs them.

The hag places Hansel in a cage to be fattened before she eats him. Gretel, however, is hung on a column of the house, reserved for some later purpose. The hag offers Hansel a whole roasted turkey, which he allows a mouse to eat. Impatiently, the hag seizes Hansel and tries to stuff him in the oven. Hansel gets out of her grasp and runs. The hag says although she's old and almost blind, her sense of smell will help her find Hansel. He then helps to free his sister and succeeds in getting the hag's nose caught in a mouse trap and also catching it in a door while she's hunting for him. After a comic chase scene, the Hansel and Gretel manage to trick the hag into running into the oven. Instead of perishing in the fire, as in the Grimm Brothers' version, the scorched hag flies out of the chimney and lands in a barrel of molasses, and runs away, barrel and all.

Back at home, the father laments for the lost children but the stepmother shows no regret. To their parents' surprise, Hansel and Gretel have returned home somehow, even managing to drag home the entire candy house. When the stepmother asks if the children have brought something home for her, they offer her bags of nuts, exclaiming, "Nuts to you!"
