= There's Something About a Soldier (1934 film) =

- Directed by: Dave Fleischer
- Produced by: Max Fleischer
- Starring: Mae Questel
- Music by: Sammy Timberg
- Animation by: Hicks Lokey; Myron Waldman
- Color process: Black-and-white
- Production company: Fleischer Studios
- Distributed by: Paramount Pictures
- Release date: August 17, 1934
- Running time: 7 minutes
- Country: United States
- Language: English

There's Something About a Soldier is a 1934 Fleischer Studios animated short film directed by Dave Fleischer and starring Betty Boop.

== Plot ==
Betty is recruiting soldiers for a war against mosquitos. She offers a kiss to anyone who enrolls, which grabs the interest of several men. When Fearless Fred joins, he is stripped to his underwear, revealing his true fat, which is eventually pressed into muscle weight and looks like a real soldier. The war on the mosquitos parodies World War I-style combat. When the townspeople win, they all celebrate, and Betty and Fred kiss.
