= Liliom =

1909 play by the Hungarian playwright Ferenc Molnár

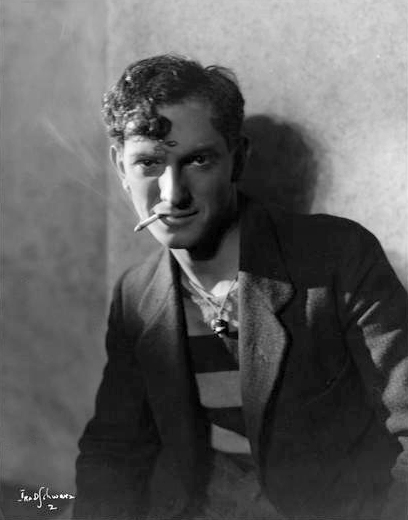
Joseph Schildkraut in the title role in the Theatre Guild production of Liliom (1921)

Liliom is a 1909 play by the Hungarian playwright Ferenc Molnár. It was well known in its own right during the early to mid-20th century, but is best known today as the basis for the Rodgers and Hammerstein 1945 musical Carousel.

== Plot ==
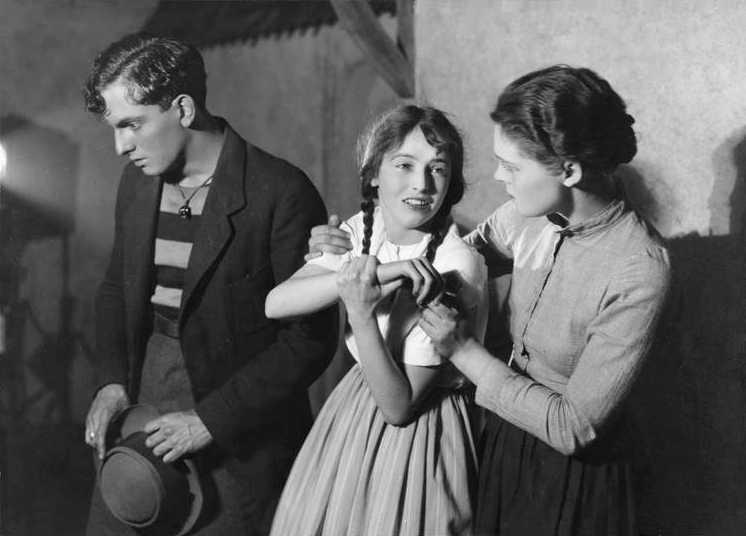
Joseph Schildkraut (Liliom), Evelyn Chard (Louise) and Eva Le Gallienne (Julie) in the 1921 Theatre Guild production

The play takes place partly in Budapest, Hungary, and partly in a waiting area just outside Heaven. The story concerns Liliom, a tough, cocky carousel barker who falls in love with Julie, a young woman who works as a maid. When both lose their jobs, Liliom begins mistreating Julie out of bitterness—even slapping her once—although he loves her. When she discovers she is pregnant, he is deliriously happy, but, unbeknownst to Julie, he agrees to participate with his friend Ficsur, a criminal, in a holdup to obtain money to provide for the child. Liliom is unwilling to leave Julie and return to his jealous former employer, the carousel owner Mrs. Muskat, and feels the robbery is his only way to obtain financial security. The holdup is a disaster, but Ficsur escapes, and Liliom kills himself to avoid capture. He is sent to a fiery place, presumably Purgatory. Sixteen years later, he is allowed to return to Earth for one day to do a good deed for his now teenage daughter, Louise, whom he has never met. If he succeeds, he will be allowed to enter Heaven. He fails in the attempt, and is presumably sent to Hell. The ending, though, focuses on Julie, who remembers Liliom fondly.

A contrasting subplot involves Julie's friend, Marie, and Wolf Beifeld, a rather pompous hotel porter who marries Marie and finally becomes the wealthy owner of the hotel at which he once worked. The two eventually have seven children, who do not appear onstage. A carpenter is also in unrequited love with Julie, and, unlike Liliom, has a stable job.

== Reception ==
Liliom was a failure in Hungary when it was staged there in 1909, but not when it was staged on Broadway in Benjamin Glazer's English translation in 1921. The Theatre Guild production starred Joseph Schildkraut and Eva Le Gallienne, with supporting roles played by such actors as Dudley Digges, Edgar Stehli, Henry Travers, and Helen Westley.

== Revivals ==
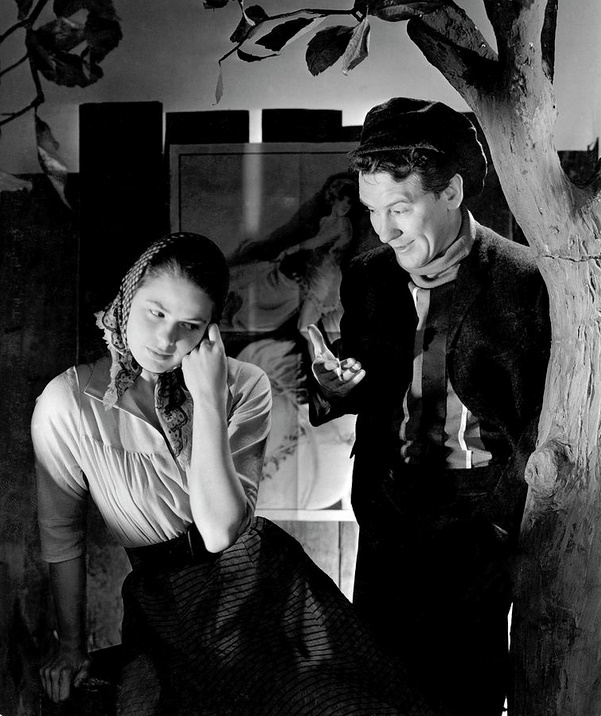
Ingrid Bergman and Burgess Meredith in the 1940 Broadway production of Liliom

- In 1923, Georges Pitoëff mounted a production at the Comédie des Champs-Élysées, in a translation by Isabelle de Comminges. Antonin Artaud had the minor role of the Heavenly Policeman.
- Ivor Novello starred as Liliom in 1926 in London, with Charles Laughton, in one of his first stage roles, as Ficsur.
- Schildkraut and Le Gallienne repeated their roles, and Sayre Crawley played the Magistrate, in the first Broadway revival of the play in 1932. Le Gallienne directed the Civic Repertory Theatre production.
- The play was directed by Federico García Lorca and Pura Maorta de Ucelay for the Club Teatral Anfistora on 7 June 1934 at the Teatro Español in Madrid. The text was translated by María de la O Lejárraga, with sets by Manuel Fontanals.
- Directing the Curtain Club in a student production at the University of Texas, James Park cast Eli Wallach in the title role.
- In 1940, another Broadway stage revival starring Burgess Meredith and Ingrid Bergman was presented at the 44th Street Theatre. Elia Kazan played Ficsur and Joan Tetzel played Louise.
- In 2014, Galin Stoev directed the play in Théâtre de Liège.

== Stage and radio adaptations ==
=== The Campbell Playhouse (1939) ===
In 1939, Orson Welles directed and played the title role in a one-hour radio adaptation for his CBS program The Campbell Playhouse. The production costarred Helen Hayes as Julie and Agnes Moorehead as Mrs. Muskat. It was broadcast live on October 22.

=== Carousel (musical, 1945) ===
In 1945, at the suggestion of the Theatre Guild (which had produced the 1921 and 1932 productions of Liliom as well as the original Oklahoma!), Richard Rodgers and Oscar Hammerstein II wrote Carousel, an American musical adaptation of Liliom. It was also produced by the Theatre Guild and became one of the great classics of musical theatre. Even though the musical adaptation took liberties with Molnár's play, changing the ending so that the ex-barker successfully helps Louise upon his return to Earth, Molnár applauded Carousel. Louise is made more poignant in the musical, in which she is snobbishly taunted and rejected because her father was a thief. It is the Liliom character who finally gives her the confidence she needs to face life. In Carousel, the characters of Marie and Wolf Beifeld in Liliom become Carrie Pipperidge and Mr. Snow, who, a fisherman in the musical, is made even more pompous than in the original play. His children are the ones who so viciously taunt Louise, although, to keep Carrie a sympathetic character, she is totally unaware of this; in contrast to Mr. Snow, she even supports a potential budding romantic relationship between their eldest son and Louise. (The relationship is quickly cut short when Mr. Snow's son insults Louise by saying that marrying her would be "beneath his station".)

Carousel also Americanizes the story, setting it in Maine in the late 19th century, and including a New England clam bake as the setting for some of the more cheerful songs in the show. Most of the other characters' names were also changed. Liliom became Billy Bigelow, Ficsur became Jigger Craigin, and Mother Hollunder, the boarding house keeper, became Julie's cousin Nettie. There is no carpenter character in Carousel.

Liliom has a layer of social commentary that Carousel deliberately omits. The intended holdup victim in Molnar's play, a payroll clerk named Linzman, is Jewish, as is Wolf Beifeld. In Carousel, Linzman becomes Mr. Bascombe, the wealthy owner of the cotton mill where Julie once worked.

In Liliom, Liliom encounters Linzman only once, during the robbery. In Carousel, Billy Bigelow has met Bascombe much earlier. Bascombe finds him and Julie together and kindly offers not to fire Julie, who has stayed out past the mill workers' curfew, if she allows him (Bascombe) to take her back to the mill. She gently refuses.

But Carousel faithfully retains many elements of Liliom, unusually in the 1940s for a musical play based on such a serious drama. Molnár's basic plotline for Liliom and Julie is largely intact, as is much of his dialogue (although Hammerstein makes it more colloquial and gives it a New England flavor). Like Liliom, Billy Bigelow is a womanizer and an abusive husband, though it is implied that he has hit his wife only once and that other characters erroneously believe that he is a habitual wife-beater. In Glazer's translation of the play, Liliom claims he only hit her once, and Julie publicly downplays what happened, but she later says he beat her "on the breast and on the head and face", and her closing line, which ends the play, is, "It is possible, dear—that someone may beat you and beat you and beat you—and not hurt you at all", indicating that it happened more than once. Julie's final line in Carousel, which does not close the play, is "It is possible, dear—fer [sic] someone to hit you—hit you hard—and not hurt at all", removing the reference to multiple beatings.

Carousel also retains the attempted robbery scene, and, like Liliom, Billy deliberately stabs himself. In the film adaptation, Billy falls on his knife while trying to get away and does not commit suicide.

=== Hamburg Ballet (2011) ===
In December 2011, a ballet adaptation of Liliom, with music by Oscar-winning composer Michel Legrand and choreography by John Neumeier, was premiered by the Hamburg Ballet, and starred Alina Cojocaru as Julie. In this version, Liliom's child is changed from being a girl to a boy (Louis instead of Louise).

=== Andrei Șerban's Carousel (2015) ===
A stage adaptation by Andrei Șerban and Daniela Dima, Carousel, also based on Fritz Lang's 1934 Liliom, has played at Bucharest's Bulandra Theatre since 2015.

== Film adaptations ==
Liliom has been filmed several times, beginning in the silent era:

- The first film version, directed by Michael Curtiz in 1919, was aborted in mid-production because of Curtiz's flight as a refugee from the Hungarian Soviet Republic, and never finished.
- The second, a somewhat disguised and heavily altered version reset in Coney Island, was made in 1921 and was titled A Trip to Paradise. It starred Bert Lytell.
- In 1930 came the first talkie version, a mostly faithful adaptation made in English by Fox Film written by S. N. Behrman and Sonya Levien, although Ficsur (played by Lee Tracy) was called "The Buzzard" in this version. The character Hollinger, who is alluded to in the stage version but never actually appears, was one of the supporting characters in this film, and Mother Hollunder, the boarding house keeper, was re-christened Aunt Hulda. Directed by Frank Borzage, the film starred Charles Farrell and Rose Hobart, and was not a success. It is rarely shown today, but has recently been issued on DVD in an enormous multi-disc set entitled Murnau, Borzage, and Fox. The package contains many of the best known silent and early talkie films that F. W. Murnau and Frank Borzage made for Fox Film. The 1930 Liliom is, as yet, not available as a single disc.
- In 1934 came what is considered to be the most notable film version of Molnar's original play—the French film version directed by Fritz Lang, starring Charles Boyer and Madeleine Ozeray. This version, released by Fox Europa, was also seen extremely rarely until it was made available on DVD in 2004. On the whole, it was a very faithful adaptation. Lang, however, omitted the characters of Wolf Beifeld and the Carpenter. Mother Hollunder was renamed Mrs. Menoux. In Lang's version, Hollinger again appears onscreen. He is a jealous barker who tries to undermine Liliom at the amusement park. It is Mrs. Menoux's assistant, a meek young man, who serves as substitute for the Carpenter and is infatuated with Julie. The criminal Ficsur, who leads Liliom into committing a holdup, was renamed Alfred. In this version, Liliom slaps Julie onscreen; in the original stage versions of both Liliom and Carousel he is never shown doing this.

These first two talking film versions of Molnar's original play also alter the ending to make it more hopeful, though not as drastically as Carousel does. (A Trip to Paradise also featured a happy ending.) In the 1934 French film, Liliom finally does gain entry into Heaven, not because he has successfully done something good for his daughter, but because of Julie's forgiveness and love for him. Likewise, in the 1930 American film version, Liliom feels that he has failed, but the Heavenly Magistrate (H. B. Warner) reassures him that he has not, because Julie clearly still loves him. But it is never revealed in this version whether or not Liliom actually enters Heaven.

By contrast, in the original stage play, Liliom is ominously and sternly led offstage after he fails in his heavenly mission and is never seen or heard from again, although Julie still remembers him fondly.

- The play has also been adapted for Austrian and German television, and twice for Spanish television.
- Rodgers and Hammerstein's musical adaptation, Carousel, was made into a CinemaScope 55 color film by 20th-Century Fox in 1956, starring Gordon MacRae and Shirley Jones. The movie version of the hit musical failed to attract wide public attention at the time, although its soundtrack album was a best-seller and remains so to this day. In 2006, this film and the 1934 film of Liliom were packaged together on a 2-Disc DVD. (See the article on the film, Carousel.)
- A television adaptation of Carousel, starring Robert Goulet and a previously unknown singer-actress named Mary Grover, aired in 1967 on the ABC network.

== Major characters in Liliom ==
- Liliom, a carousel barker
- Julie, a housemaid who falls in love with Liliom
- Mrs. Muskat, owner of the carousel at which Liliom works; she is infatuated with Liliom
- Ficsur, a criminal and friend of Liliom
- Mother Hollunder, owner of the boarding house at which Liliom and Julie are staying
- Young Hollunder, her son
- Marie, Julie's friend
- Wolf Beifeld, a hotel porter and Marie's fiancé
- A Carpenter, in unrequited love with Julie
- Louise, Liliom and Julie's daughter
- Linzman, a payroll clerk
- The Heavenly Magistrate
- Two Policemen from the Beyond

== Trivia ==
Liliom is the Hungarian word for lily, derived from the Latin lilium. Lilies are the flowers most commonly used at funerals, where they symbolically signify that the soul of the deceased has been restored to the state of innocence.

"Liliom" is just a stage name. To the police he gives his "real" name, Andreas Zavoczki.

In the 1950 film All About Eve, Eve Harrington says that she and her boyfriend Eddie acted in a small Milwaukee production of Liliom and that she was "awful".
