= Liliom (1934 film) =

- French theatrical film poster
- Directed by: Fritz Lang
- Written by: Robert Liebmann (adaptation); Bernard Zimmer (dialogue)
- Based on: Liliom by Ferenc Molnár
- Produced by: Erich Pommer
- Starring: Charles Boyer
- Cinematography: Rudolph Maté; Louis Nee
- Music by: Jean Lenoir; Franz Waxman
- Production company: Les Productions Fox Europa
- Distributed by: Fox Film Corporation
- Release date: 27 April 1934
- Running time: 116 minutes
- Country: France
- Language: French

Liliom is a 1934 French fantasy film directed by Fritz Lang based on the 1909 Hungarian stage play of the same title by Ferenc Molnár. The film stars Charles Boyer as Liliom, a carousel barker who is fired from his job after defending the chambermaid Julie (Madeleine Ozeray) from the jealousy of Mme. Muscat, the carousel owner who is infatuated with Liliom. He moves in with Julie and they begin an affair. When Liliom discovers he's about to become a father, he finds he needs money and participates in a robbery which goes awry. Rather than allow himself to be arrested, Liliom kills himself and his soul is transported to a waiting room of Heaven. A heavenly commissioner determines that Liliom will not be admitted into Heaven, only Purgatory, until he returns to Earth to do one good deed.

Liliom was one of the two first French productions by producer Erich Pommer for Fox-Europa and director Fritz Lang's only French film. On the film's release it was protested by the French Catholic clergy and was generally not well received by French film critics or playwright Ferenc Molnár. Despite the reception, the 1934 Liliom was one of Lang's favorites out of all his films.

== Plot ==
Liliom Zadowski is a barker at Madame Muscat's carousel. A rival barker named Hollinger tries to get Liliom in trouble by telling the jealous Mme. Muscat, who is having an affair with Liliom, that Liliom flirts with his customers behind her back. When Mme. Muscat insults Liliom's female customers Julie and Marie, Liliom comes to their defense, which leads to Mme. Muscat firing Liliom. Liliom makes a date with Julie and Marie and leaves the carousel. When he meets the girls later, Liliom tells them that he intends to only take one of them out, which leads to Liliom going only with Julie. Julie is infatuated with Liliom and they move in together in a run-down trailer. Julie works in a photo studio while Liliom loafs, drinks and gets into violent arguments with Julie.

Mme. Muscat later tries to bring Liliom back to the carousel by offering him a substantial raise. Liliom considers it but denies the offer finding that Julie is expecting a child. Liliom's criminal friend Alfred suggests that the two rob the local payroll clerk, and insists that Liliom bring a knife, as Alfred will also do. Desperate to find money for the child, Liliom agrees. The robbery attempt is foiled and Alfred escapes while Liliom finds himself cornered by the police. Rather than be arrested, Liliom stabs himself with the kitchen knife he brought with him to commit the robbery. An unconscious Liliom is brought home on a stretcher. Near death, he repents and tells Julie that he must face the judgment of God. He then dies.

Liliom's soul rises from his body when he is visited by two uniformed agents who identify themselves as God's Police. They take Liliom to Heaven where he is taken to an area for suicides. There, Liliom is questioned by an officious commissioner who looks exactly like a police commissioner that Lilom reported to once while alive. When Liliom refuses to explain to the clerk why he beat Julie, he is first shown a silent film of one of his arguments with her, then again with a soundtrack of his thoughts. He realizes that he beat Julie because he hated himself so much for his cruelty and selfishness. The Commissioner sentences Liliom to sixteen years in Purgatory, so that he will be cleansed of his pride and violence. Afterwards, he will be allowed one day back on Earth to visit his child, and his behavior on that day will determine where he shall spend eternity.

Sixteen years pass and Liliom is allowed to visit his daughter, who is named Louise in the play, but whose name is not mentioned in this film version. One of the angels reminds Liliom to bring his daughter something beautiful, and Liliom surreptitiously steals a star on his way down to Earth. Liliom approaches Louise and tells her that he knew her father many years ago, and that he was a violent brute. This disgusts Louise, who throws Liliom's gift of a star into the gutter. Liliom follows the sobbing Louise home, where she demands to be alone. Liliom slaps her hand out of frustration before disappearing.

As Liliom returns to Heaven, the angels watch as the scales of justice tip toward the devil's side, and the devil begins to inscribe Liliom's name on his tablet. In Heaven, the commissioner is furious at Liliom for breaking the heart of a child, and Liliom responds that one can only love him as he is. Just then the angel-typist excitedly points to a scene happening down on Earth. Louise is then seen telling her mother that Liliom's slap felt like a kiss, and asks if it is possible to receive a slap that does not hurt at all. Julie says yes and the two embrace with tears in their eyes. It is Liliom's love for his daughter which has miraculously made the slap feel exactly like a kiss. The scales of justice tip toward the heavenly side and Liliom's name is slowly removed from the devil's tablet.

== Cast ==
- Madeleine Ozeray as Julie/Her Daughter with Liliom
- Charles Boyer as Liliom
- Pierre Alcover as Alfred
- Roland Toutain as Sailor
- Robert Arnoux as Strong Arm
- Alexandre Rignault as Hollinger
- Raoul Marco as Detective
- Antonin Artaud as Knife Grinder
- Maximilienne as Madame Menoux
- Florelle as Madame Moscat

== Production ==
After being fired by Universum Film AG (UFA), producer Erich Pommer moved to France in April 1933 where he founded the Fox-Europa film studio based at the Joinville Studios in Paris. Pommer's studio began work on their first two films: the detective film On a volé un Homme and an adaptation of Ferenc Molnár's Liliom. Pommer had two directors to work with: Max Ophüls and Fritz Lang. Pommer gave the Liliom story to Lang, which Ophüls later felt was a mistake, stating that "Lang would have certainly made a remarkable detective film, and as for me, I probably would have probably succeeded in making a good romantic comedy". The screenplay for Liliom was written by Robert Liebmann. Liebmann was fired from Universum Film AG, his former studio in Germany after they purged the company of all Jewish staff. Liebmann fled to France where he was worked on adapting on the screenplay for Liliom.

Production on Liliom began in late 1933. Lang was not completely fluent in French, and was assisted by Gilbert Mandelik in learning French filmmaking translations to help the production on the film. The French cast included Charles Boyer, who worked with Pommer on several French-language versions of German films. Madeleine Ozeray, who was part of Boyer's stage company, played Julie. The technical crew of Liliom included cinematographer Rudolph Maté who worked with Pommer as a second-unit photographer in Berlin.

During production, Lang zealously took to the project, annotating the screenplay with his own notes and ignoring advice from others. Screenwriter Bernard Zimmer suggested scenes that did get filmed, but were later cut during post-production by Lang. After production ended in early 1934, Lang spent 48 hours without sleep to finish editing Liliom before the film was to be shown to the producers.

== Release ==
Liliom premiered in France on April 27, 1934. The French Catholic clergy protested Liliom on its initial release due to Lang's conception of heaven to be too contrary to the perception of the church. The original playwright, Ferenc Molnár, denounced the film because he did not receive screen credit on the poster. Liliom was not a commercial success and did not receive a wide release in the United States. It was shown in New York in 1935.

=== Reception ===
Liliom received generally negative reception on its initial release. Jean Vidal of the film magazine Pour Vous wrote that "A pace that's rather too slow spoils the movement of the film". A review in Le Journal criticized the picture's visual effects, arguing that emphasis on them detracted from the other film elements. The film was also criticized by France's far-right press. Jean Faynard of Candide described the film as "false, stiff and badly situated". In Action Française, the French fascist Lucien Rebatet, writing under his pseudonym "François Vinneuil", declared "the result is a heterogeneous spectacle... this French-Jewish-Hungarian collaboration doesn't create a breathable atmosphere". Despite the film's reception, Liliom was one of Lang's favourite directorial efforts. In 1974, Lang stated that "Liliom, I always liked very much... Today, I almost like Liliom best of all".

=== Home video ===
Liliom was released on a Region 1 DVD by Kino International on March 30, 2004. In 2006, Liliom was included on the 50th Anniversary Edition DVD of Carousel.

== See also ==
- List of films about angels
- List of fantasy films of the 1930s
- List of French films of 1934
