= Gaston Ravel =

French filmmaker and film director

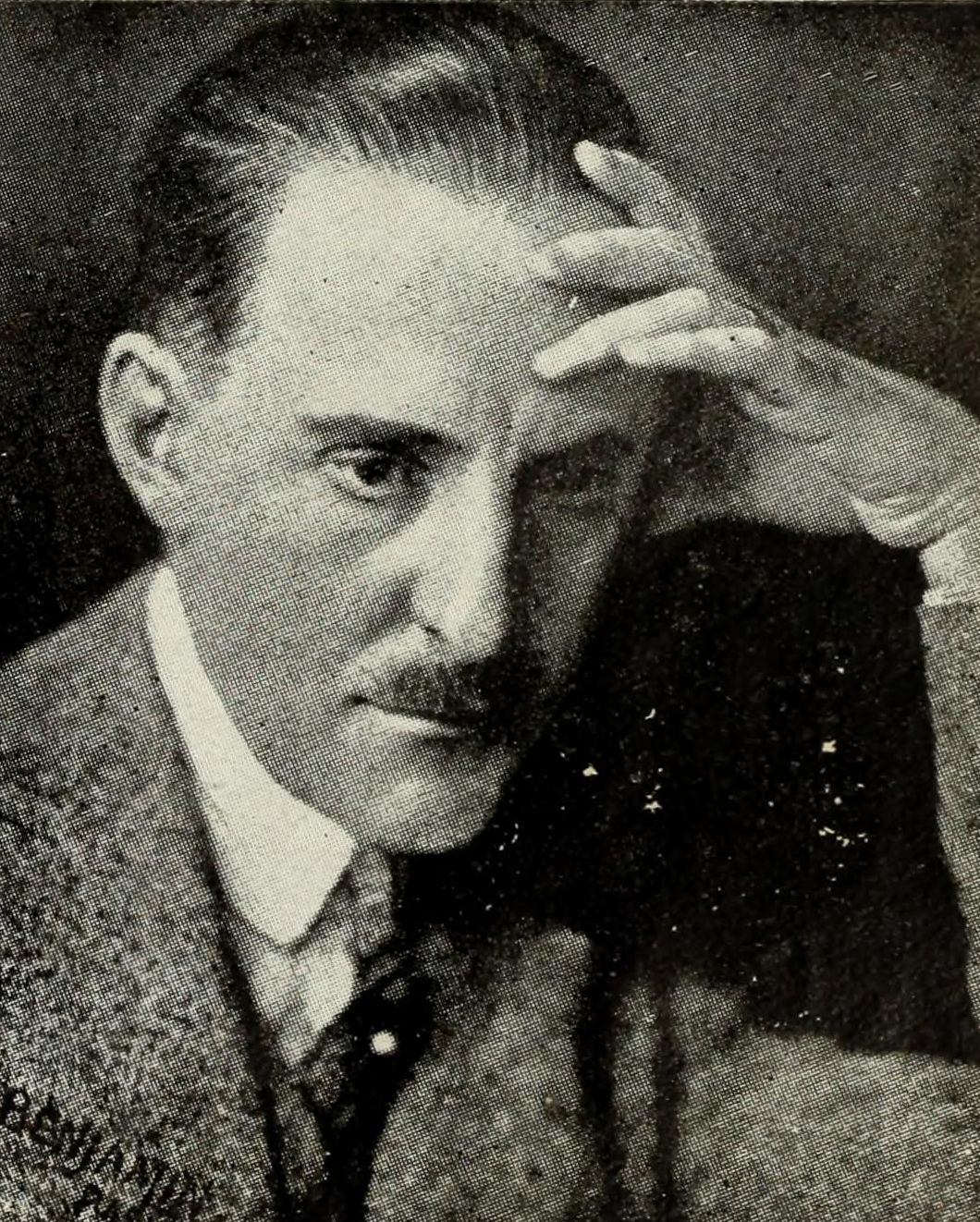
- Born: Gaston Pierre Achille Ravel; 28 October 1878; Paris, France
- Died: 23 February 1958 (aged 79); Cannes, France
- Other name: Gaston Levar
- Occupations: Director, Screenwriter
- Years active: 1914 - 1934 (film)

Gaston Ravel (French pronunciation: [ɡastɔ̃ ʁavɛl]; 1878–1958) was a French screenwriter and film director. He made over sixty films, mostly during the silent era. In 1929 he co-directed the historical film The Queen's Necklace. He directed Musidora in various shorts.

Jacques Feyder was his assistant director on Des pieds et des mains and Monsieur Pinson policier, in which he played, before directing his first feature L'Atlantide.

== Selected filmography ==
- The Knot (1921)
- Ferragus (1923)
- The Advocate (1925)
- Jocaste (1925)
- Mademoiselle Josette, My Woman (1926)
- A Gentleman of the Ring (1926)
- Madame Récamier (1928)
- The Queen's Necklace (1929)
- Figaro (1929)
- The Stranger (1931)
- Fanatisme (1934)
- The Rosary (1934)

== Bibliography ==
- Klossner, Michael. The Europe of 1500-1815 on Film and Television: A Worldwide Filmography of Over 2550 Works, 1895 Through 2000. McFarland, 2002.
