= Road to Ruin =

Road to Ruin, or The Road to Ruin may refer to:

== Film ==
- The Road to Ruin (1913 film), a 1913 silent film starring J. Warren Kerrigan and Charlotte Burton
- The Road to Ruin (1928 film), a 1928 silent film
- The Road to Ruin (1934 film), the exploitation film directed by Dorothy Davenport and Melville Shyer
- Road to Ruin (1991 film), the mainstream film starring Peter Weller

== Literature ==
- The Road to Ruin (play), a 1792 comedy by Thomas Holcroft
- The Road to Ruin, a John Dortmunder novel by Donald E. Westlake
- The Road to Ruin: How Tony Abbott and Peta Credlin Destroyed Their Own Government, a 2016 book by Australian journalist Niki Savva

== Music ==
- Road to Ruin (Ramones album), the 1978 album by the Ramones
- Road to Ruin (The Mr. T Experience album), a 1998 tribute to the Ramones
- The Road to Ruin (John and Beverley Martyn album), a 1970 folk album by John and Beverley Martyn
- "Road to Ruin", a song on Lean into It by Mr. Big
- "Road to Ruin", a song on The Libertines by The Libertines
- "Road to Ruin", a song on Never, Neverland by Annihilator
- "Road to Ruin", a song by on Born Too Late by Church of Misery
- "Road to Ruin", the original title of "Hey Now What You Doing", a song on Waiting for the Sirens' Call by New Order

== Other ==
- Road to Ruin, an internet video show by Sum 41
- The Road to Ruin: The Global Elites' Secret Plan for the Next Financial Crisis, a 2016 book by James Rickards
