= Always Tomorrow (disambiguation) =

"Always Tomorrow" is a 1992 song by Gloria Estefan.

Always Tomorrow may also refer to:

- Always Tomorrow (album), a 2020 album by Best Coast
- Always Tomorrow: The Portrait of an American Business, a 1941 film about the Coca-Cola company
- "Always Tomorrow", a song by Shane Filan from the album You and Me, 2013
