= Walter James (actor) =

American character actor (1882–1946)

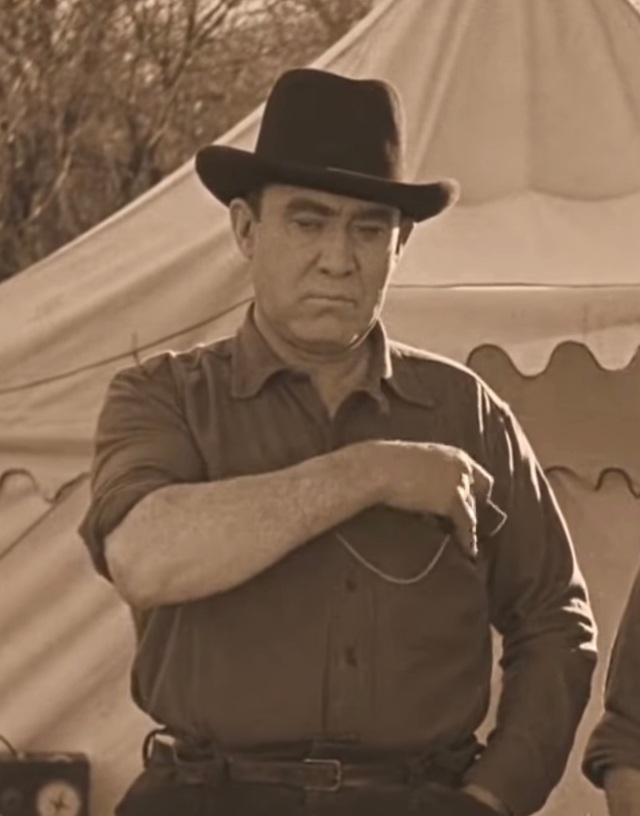
- James in Battling Butler (1926)
- Born: June 3, 1882; Chattanooga, Tennessee, U.S.
- Died: June 27, 1946 (aged 64); Gardena, California, U.S.
- Occupation: Actor
- Years active: 1915–1943

Walter James (June 3, 1882 – June 27, 1946) was an American character actor. He appeared in more than 50 films between 1915 and 1942. He was born in Chattanooga, Tennessee, and died in Gardena, California from a heart attack.

== Partial filmography ==
- The Unbroken Road (1915)
- A Daughter of the Gods (1916) - Chief Eunuch
- Souls Adrift (1917) - A Swede Sailor
- The Idol Dancer (1920) - Chief Wando
- Dead Men Tell No Tales (1920) - José
- Fair Lady (1922) - Gian Norcone
- The Secrets of Paris (1922) - The Strangler
- Two Shall Be Born (1924) - Hund
- The Monster (1925) - Caliban
- The Everlasting Whisper (1925) - Aswin Brody
- Little Annie Rooney (1925) - Officer Rooney
- The Seventh Bandit (1926) - Ben Goring
- Glenister of the Mounted (1926) - Thorald
- Battling Butler (1926) - The Mountain Girl's Father
- The Kid Brother (1927) - Jim Hickory
- Rich Men's Sons (1927) - Clerk (uncredited)
- The Blood Ship (1927) - Capt. Angus Swope
- The Patent Leather Kid (1927) - Officer Riley
- The Irresistible Lover (1927) - Mr. Kennedy
- The Road to Ruin (1928) - Headwaiter (uncredited)
- The Big Killing (1928) - Sheriff
- The Wright Idea (1928) - Capt. Sandy
- Me, Gangster (1928) - Police Capt. Dodd
- The Divine Lady (1929) - One of Nelson's Ship's Officers (uncredited)
- Hell's Heroes (1929) - Sheriff
- Shadow of the Law (1930) - Captain of the Guards
- The Public Defender (1931) - Police Captain Anderson (uncredited)
- Street Scene (1931) - Police Marshal James Henry
- Scareheads (1931)
- Docks of San Francisco (1932) - Phony Café Waiter (uncredited)
- Police Court (1932) - Cappy Hearn
- Ann Vickers (1933) - Guard (uncredited)
- Hips, Hips, Hooray! (1934) - Mountaineer (uncredited)
- No More Women (1934) - Bouncer (uncredited)
- The Road to Ruin (1934) - Headwaiter (uncredited)
- The Cat's-Paw (1934) - Nightclub Doorman (uncredited)
- Jealousy (1934) - Cop (uncredited)
- Arizona Bad Man (1935) - Jack - Bartender
- The Public Menace (1935) - Policeman (uncredited)
- Hitch Hike Lady (1935) - Chief of Police (uncredited)
- Custer's Last Stand (1936, Serial) - Judge Hooker [Chs.12-14]
- Riffraff (1936) - Townsman (uncredited)
- Modern Times (1936) - Assembly Line Foreman (uncredited)
- White Fang (1936) - Posse Member (uncredited)
- Oh, Susanna! (1936) - Sage City Sheriff Briggs
- California Mail (1936) - Man Who Bets $1000 (uncredited)
- Mountain Justice (1937) - Juror (uncredited)
- This Is My Affair (1937) - Dinner Guest (uncredited)
- The Lone Ranger (1938, Serial) - Joe Cannon (Ch. 11) (uncredited)
- Professor Beware (1938) - Man with New Hat (uncredited)
- Disbarred (1939) - Juror (uncredited)
- Eternally Yours (1939) - Police Official (uncredited)
- Invisible Stripes (1939) - Worker (uncredited)
- Legion of the Lawless (1940) - Vigilante at Meeting (uncredited)
- The Kid's Last Ride (1941) - Bartender (uncredited)
- Citizen Kane (1941) - Ward Heeler (uncredited)
- The Lone Rider Fights Back (1941) - Bartender (uncredited)
- The Panther's Claw (1942) - Capt. Tom Henry
- Good Luck, Mr. Yates (1943) - Leading Citizen (uncredited)
