= The Traitor (1936 American film) =

1936 US film directed by Sam Newfield

- Film poster
- Directed by: Sam Newfield
- Written by: John Thomas Neville; Joseph O'Donnell
- Produced by: Sigmund Neufeld; Leslie Simmonds
- Starring: Tim McCoy; Frances Grant; Frank Melton
- Cinematography: Jack Greenhalgh
- Edited by: John English
- Production company: Excelsior Pictures
- Distributed by: Puritan Pictures
- Release date: August 29, 1936 (US)
- Running time: 60 minutes
- Country: United States
- Language: English

The Traitor is a 1936 American Western film directed by Sam Newfield and starring Tim McCoy, Frances Grant, and Frank Melton. It was released on August 29, 1936.

== Premise ==
Texas Ranger Tim Vallance is pursuing a criminal called Pedro Moreno in vain. Vallance manages to enter Moreno's gang undercover by working at a ranch, Flying A Ranch, held by Jimmy, one of Pedro's accomplices, and his sister Mary. Vallance expects to catch the gang when they are moving drugs across the border.

== Cast ==
- Tim McCoy as Tim Vallance
- Frances Grant (pseudonym used by Stella McCarron) as Mary Allen
- Frank Melton as Jimmy Allen
- Pedro Regas as Pedro Moreno
- Frank Glendon as Big George
- Karl Hackett as Captain John Hughes (credited as Carl Hackett)
- Dick Curtis as Morgan
- Roger Williams as Sheriff
- Jack Rockwell as Smoky
- Dick Botiller as Remos
