= Circumstantial Evidence (1929 American film) =

1929 film by Wilfred Noy

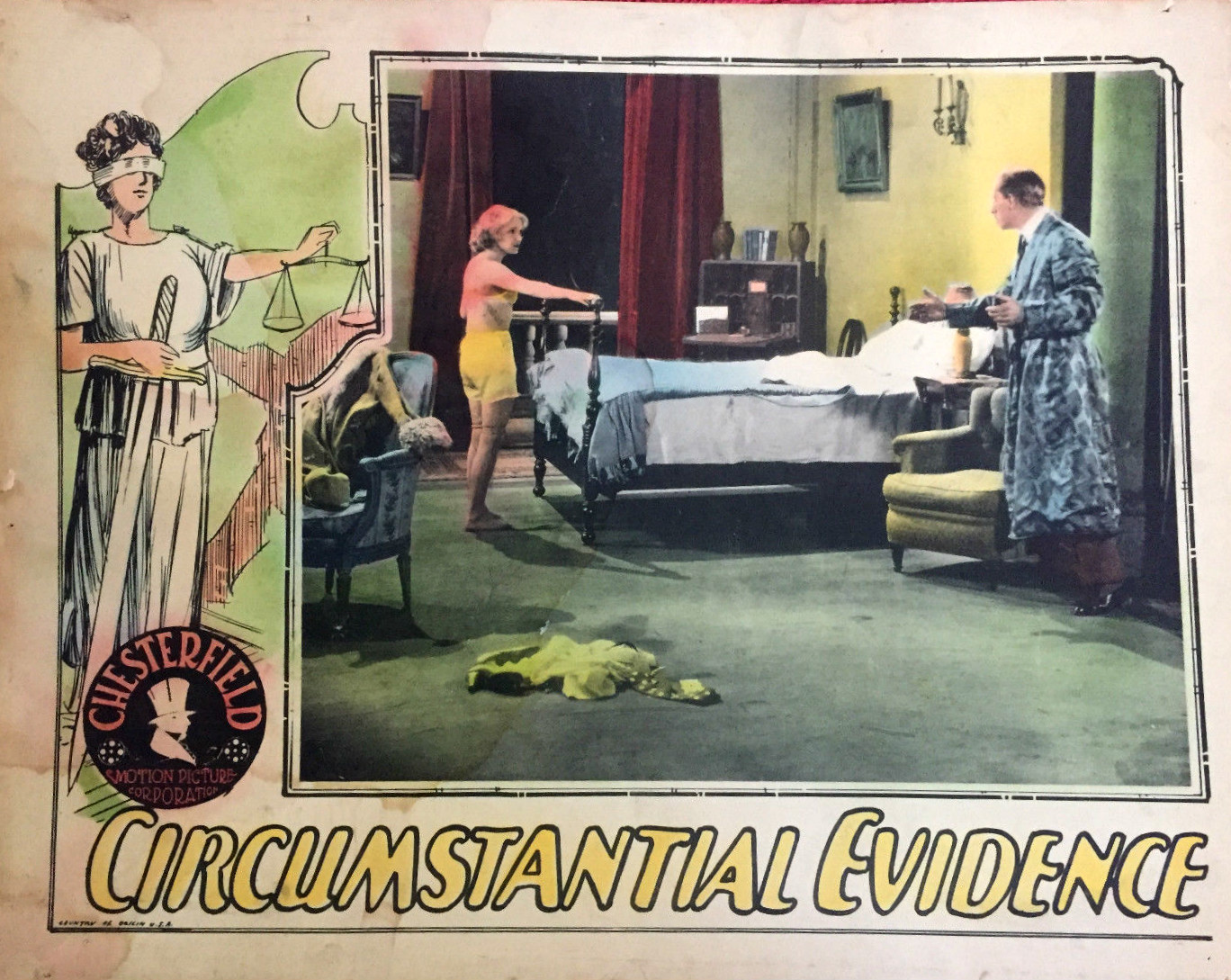
- Lobby card
- Directed by: Wilfred Noy
- Written by: Lee Authmar; Wilfred Noy
- Starring: Cornelius Keefe; Helen foster Alice Lake
- Cinematography: M. A. Anderson
- Edited by: James Sweeney
- Production company: Chesterfield Pictures
- Distributed by: Chesterfield Pictures
- Release date: April 1, 1929
- Country: United States
- Language: Silent (English intertitles)

Circumstantial Evidence is a 1929 American crime film directed by Wilfred Noy and starring Cornelius Keefe, Helen Foster, and Alice Lake.

== Cast ==
- Cornelius Keefe as Arthur Rowland
- Helen Foster as Jean Benton
- Alice Lake as Lucy Bishop
- Charles K. Gerrard as Henry Lord
- Ray Hallor as Tony Benton
- Fred Walton as Judge
- Jack Tanner as Prosecuting Attorney
