= Johnny Arthur =

Actor

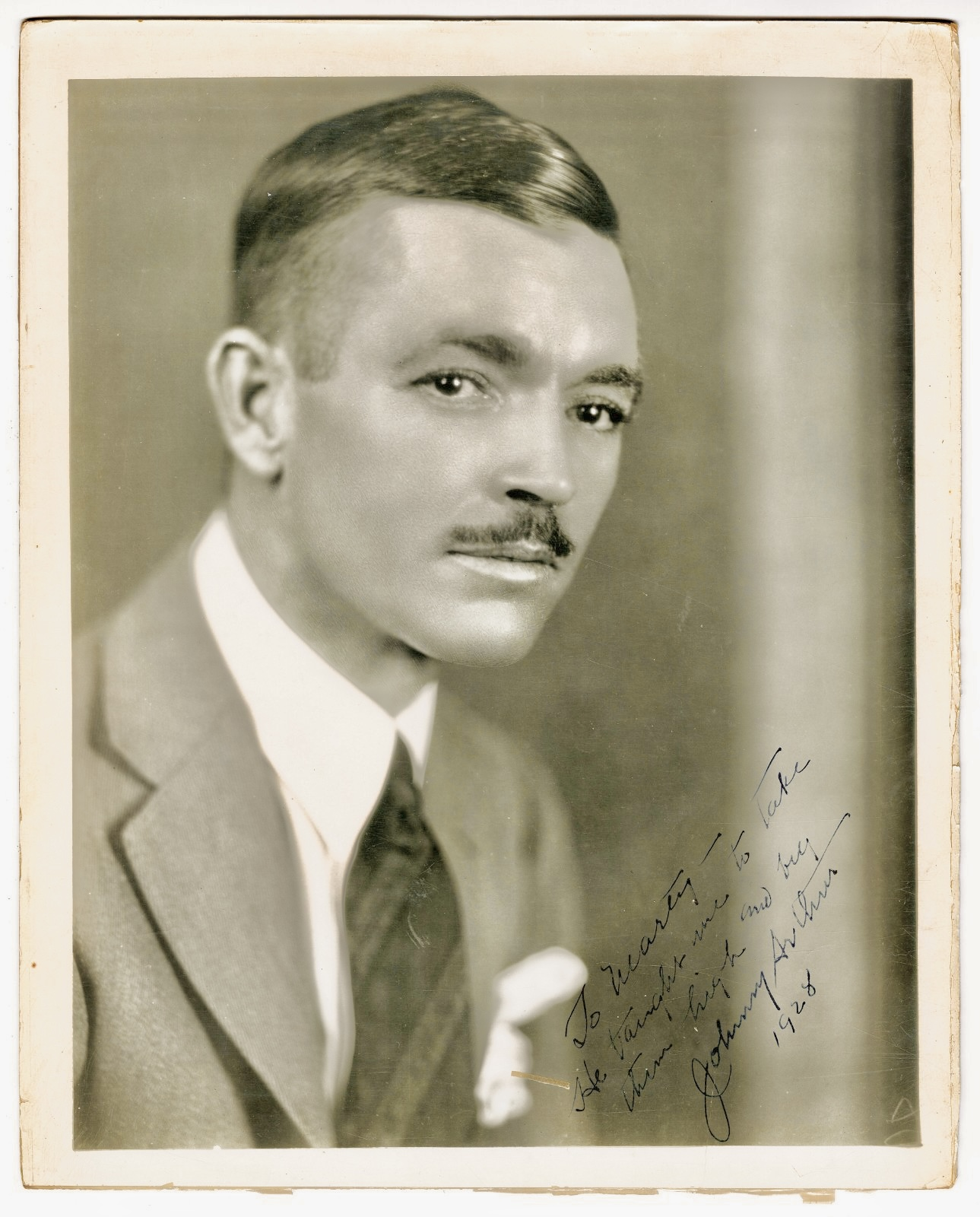
- Inscribed Photo (1928)
- Born: John Lennox Arthur Long; May 20, 1883; Scottdale, Pennsylvania, U.S.
- Died: December 31, 1951 (aged 68); Woodland Hills, California, U.S.
- Resting place: Valhalla Memorial Park Cemetery
- Occupation: Actor
- Years active: 1923-1947

Johnny Arthur (born John Lennox Arthur Long; May 20, 1883 – December 31, 1951) was an American stage and motion picture actor.

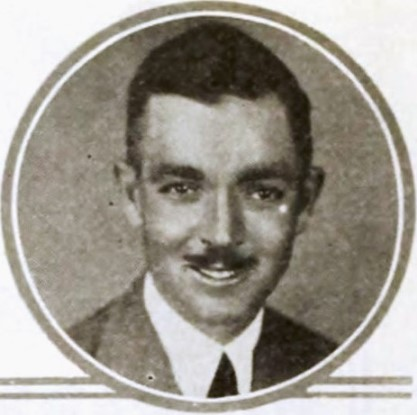
From a 1925 magazine

== Early years ==
Born in Scottdale, Pennsylvania to John William Long and Matilda (née Hertzog) Long, Arthur was a veteran of 25 years on stage before he made his screen debut in 1923's The Unknown Purple. Arthur's screen personality was neutral enough to allow him to play the romantic lead in the Lon Chaney vehicle The Monster (1925).

== Sound era ==
With the coming of sound, Arthur developed his first comic persona -- a "pansy", or effeminate character -- in films such as The Desert Song (1929), She Couldn't Say No (1930), Penrod and Sam (1931) and The Ghost Walks (1934). When the Production Code took effect on July 1, 1934, the overtly homosexual characters played by Arthur were toned down in Hollywood movies. He spent the rest of the 1930s playing timid, worried, or fussy characters. This served him well in low-budget films like Ellis Island and Danger on the Air, as well as big-budget pictures like Crime and Punishment and Road to Singapore. Most of his later roles were unbilled bits.

Arthur is perhaps most remembered for his appearances as Darla Hood's father in Hal Roach's Our Gang shorts. He is also noted for his featured appearance in one of Roach's wartime burlesques of the Axis powers, That Nazty Nuisance (1942); Arthur was the Japanese caricature "Suki Yaki". Arthur's broad villainy was noticed by Republic Pictures, then casting a serial that required a Japanese antagonist. Johnny Arthur took the role and played it menacingly in The Masked Marvel (1943).

== Career slowdown ==
Johnny Arthur suffered periods of ill health, which slowed his acting career. His steady film work stalled in 1945, and he took a job with the kitchen staff of the Gilbert Hotel in downtown Los Angeles. He also took living quarters there. In December 1946 the 63-year-old Arthur slipped into a coma and was found in his hotel room by a fellow employee; the intervention saved his life. Days later he was "slightly better" while convalescing at the Cedars of Lebanon hospital.

Johnny Arthur's generosity toward other actors was exemplary. While he led his own life in reduced circumstances, according to Variety, "he spent thousands of dollars buying meals for the hungry and actors in dire straits. Reportedly, most of a considerable savings account was thus spent, which left him without funds for himself."

Columnist Louella Parsons noted the actor's plight: "Johnny Arthur, fine screen comedian, has been unable to get a screen job and has been working in the kitchen of a local hotel." The Parsons appeal resulted in an immediate job offer from radio producer Larry Finley. He signed Arthur to a 52-week contract, to appear on the transcribed Diary of Fate radio series.

After that engagement Arthur returned to the stage, and appeared in the Norman Krasna-Groucho Marx comedy play April Fool (later revised as Time for Elizabeth). Mike Connolly of Variety reported that Johnny Arthur was still active in 1950, doing "bits and radio". He performed in one final film, I Want You, released in 1951.

== Death ==
Johnny Arthur died on December 31, 1951, at age 68, at the Motion Picture Country Hospital. He was buried at the charitable expense of the Motion Picture Fund in Valhalla Memorial Park Cemetery, but left in an unmarked grave for 60 years until November 2012, when the Friends of Dearly Departed Tours and Findadeath.com raised the funds for a gravestone.

== Selected filmography ==
- The Unknown Purple (1923) - Freddie Goodlittle
- Mademoiselle Midnight (1924) - Carlos de Quiros
- Daring Love (1924)
- The Monster (1925) - The Under Clerk
- The Tourist (1925, Short)
- Cleaning Up (1925, Short) - The Husband
- My Stars (1926, Short) - Johnny
- Home Cured (1926, Short) - The Hypochondriac
- Honest Injun (1926, Short) - Johnny Peppercorn
- Open House (1926, Short) - Mr. Brown
- The Humdinger (1926, Short) - Johnny - the Small Town Boob
- Close Shaves (1926, Short) - The Barber
- Wedding Yells (1927, Short) - The Groom
- The Draw-Back (1927, Short) - Horace Hayseed
- Her Husky Hero (1927, Short) - The Henpecked Husband
- Live News (1927, Short) - The Young Reporter
- Scared Silly (1927, Short)
- Wildcat Valley (1928, Short)
- Visitors Welcome (1928, Short) - The Husband
- Blondes Beware (1928, Short)
- Wedded Blisters (1928, Short)
- On Trial (1928) - Stanley Glover
- The Eligible Mr. Bangs (1929, Short) - Tom
- The Desert Song (1929) - Benny Kidd
- Hot Lemonade (1929, Short) - The Lothario
- The Gamblers (1929) - George Cowper
- Lovers' Delight (1929, Short)
- Divorce Made Easy (1929) - Percy Deering
- A Hint to Brides (1929, Short) - The Newlywed Husband
- Adam's Eve (1929, Short)
- The Show of Shows (1929) - Hero - Performer in 'The Pirate'
- The Aviator (1929) - Hobart
- Personality (1930) - Sandy Jenkins
- She Couldn't Say No (1930) - Tommy Blake
- Scrappily Married (1930, Short)
- Down with Husbands (1930, Short) - Henry Sweet
- Paper Hanging with Johnny Arthur (1930, Short) - Johnny
- Cheer Up and Smile (1930) - Andy
- Going Wild (1930) - Simpkins
- It's a Wise Child (1931) - Otho Peabody
- Penrod and Sam (1931) - Mr. Bassett
- Should Crooners Marry (1933, Short)
- Easy Millions (1933)
- Convention City (1933) - Leonard Travis
- Registered Nurse (1934) - Ambulance Attendant (uncredited)
- Twenty Million Sweethearts (1934) - Norma Hanson's Secretary
- Many Happy Returns (1934) - Davis
- Dames (1934) - Billings - Ounce's Secretary
- The Ghost Walks (1934) - Homer Erskine
- Hell in the Heavens (1934) - Clarence Perkins
- Anniversary Trouble (1935, Short) - John Spanky's Father
- Traveling Saleslady (1935) - Melton
- Doubting Thomas (1935) - Ralph Twiller
- Here Comes the Band (1935) - Audience Member (uncredited)
- It's in the Air (1935) - Jones, Photographer
- Rendezvous (1935) - Code Room Clerk (uncredited)
- Crime and Punishment (1935) - Clerk
- Too Tough to Kill (1935) - Willie Dent
- The Bride Comes Home (1935) - Otto
- The Murder of Dr. Harrigan (1936) - Mr. Wentworth
- Freshman Love (1936) - Mr. Fields
- All-American Toothache (1936, Short) - Dental Professor
- The King Steps Out (1936) - Chief of the Secret Police
- The Ex-Mrs. Bradford (1936) - Mr. Frankenstein, Process Server (uncredited)
- Stage Struck (1936) - Oscar Freud
- Our Relations (1936) - Denker's Beer Garden / Nightclub Customer (uncredited)
- Ellis Island (1936) - Kip Andrews
- Under Cover of Night (1937) - Dr. Busby - Coroner
- The Hit Parade (1937) - Success-Story Teller (uncredited)
- It Happened Out West (1937) - Thad Crookshank
- Pick a Star (1937) - Newlywed
- Night 'n' Gales (1937, Short) - Arthur Hood, Darla's father
- Make a Wish (1937) - Antoine
- Fit for a King (1937) - Plotter (uncredited)
- Something to Sing About (1937) - Mr. Daviani
- Blossoms on Broadway (1937) - P.J. Quinterfield Jr.
- Amateur Crook (1937) - Pedestrian (uncredited)
- Every Day's a Holiday (1937) - Bit Part (uncredited)
- Exiled to Shanghai (1937) - Poppolas
- Feed 'em and Weep (1938, Short) - Johnny Hood, Darla's Father
- One Wild Night (1938) - Murgatroyd (uncredited)
- Danger on the Air (1938) - Aiken
- Half-way to Hollywood (1938, Short) - Johnny
- You Can't Take It with You (1938) - Kirby's Office Aide (uncredited)
- Fugitives for a Night (1938) - Tootsies - Car Rental Man (uncredited)
- Jeepers Creepers (1939) - Peabody
- Road to Singapore (1940) - Timothy Willow (uncredited)
- Scatterbrain (1940) - (uncredited)
- Li'l Abner (1940) - Montague
- Road Show (1941) - Mr. N - Asylum Inmate (uncredited)
- Tight Shoes (1941) - Chapel Manager (uncredited)
- Mountain Moonlight (1941) - Holbrook
- Always Tomorrow: The Portrait of an American Business (1941) - Larry Larabee
- Shepherd of the Ozarks (1942) - Doolittle
- A Desperate Chance for Ellery Queen (1942) - Riley - Reporter (uncredited)
- Moonlight Masquerade (1942) - Minor Role (uncredited)
- Henry Aldrich Gets Glamour (1943) - Hotchkiss (uncredited)
- That Nazty Nuisance (1943) - Suki Yaki
- The Masked Marvel (1943) - Mura Sakima
- This Is the Life (1944) - Mr. Ferguson (uncredited)
- Take It Big (1944) - Desk Clerk (uncredited)
- It's in the Bag! (1945) - Finley (uncredited)
- Follow That Woman (1945) - Jeweler (uncredited)
- It Happened on 5th Avenue (1947) - Apartment Manager (uncredited)
- I Want You (1951) - (uncredited)
