= The Unknown Purple =

1923 film by Roland West

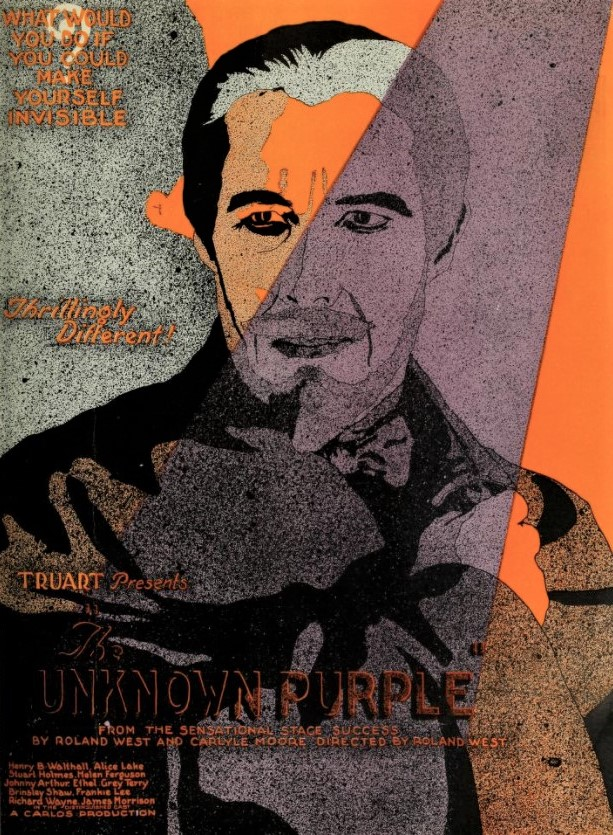
- Advertisement from The Film Daily
- Directed by: Roland West
- Written by: Roland West; Paul Schofield; Alfred A. Cohn (titles)
- Starring: Henry B. Walthall; Alice Lake; Stuart Holmes; Helen Ferguson
- Cinematography: Oliver T. Marsh
- Edited by: Alfred A. Cohn
- Production company: Carlos Productions
- Distributed by: Truart Film Corporation
- Release date: October 29, 1923
- Running time: 92 minutes
- Country: United States
- Language: Silent (English intertitles)

The Unknown Purple is a lost 1923 American silent mystery film that was written and directed by Roland West.

== Plot ==
After his release from prison, an inventor develops an eerie purple light that renders him invisible, enabling him to seek revenge on his unfaithful wife and his crooked business partner.

== Cast ==
- Henry B. Walthall as Peter Marchmont
- Alice Lake as Jewel Marchmont
- Stuart Holmes as James Dawson
- Helen Ferguson as Ruth Marsh
- Frankie Lee as Bobbie
- Dorothy Phillips as Mrs. Freddie Goodlittle
- Ethel Grey Terry as Leslie Bradbury
- James Morrison as Leslie Bradbury
- Johnny Arthur as Freddie Goodlittle
- Richard Wayne as George Allison
- Brinsley Shaw as Hawkins
- Mike Donlin as Burton

== Production ==
Film historian Scott MacQueen cited "The Vanishing Men", a treatment West had targeted for film in 1921, as the inspiration for the film. In that way, it’s also inspired by H.G. Wells’ novel The Invisible Man, which wouldn’t get a proper adaptation until a decade later in 1933. The film was adapted from a stage play which was written by Roland West and Carlyle Moore. Comedian Johnny Arthur made his feature-length debut in The Unknown Purple.

== Release ==
The premiere of The Unknown Purple was on October 29, 1923 at Strand Theatre in Providence, Rhode Island. The manager of the repeater said in Moving Picture World that the film "opened with capacity business."

== Reception ==
In contemporary reviews, Variety described the film as an "exceptionally well-made picture - among the best of its type - a mystery." The review praised the photography of Oliver Marsh and the acting by Henry Walthall and Alice Lake. Mary Kelly of Moving Picture World described the film making good use of actor Henry Walthall and that the production was "elaborate and impressive" while finding the only lacking element in the film was comedy.

== See also ==
- Invisibility in fiction
