= Red River Valley (1936 film) =

1936 film by B. Reeves Eason

- Theatrical release poster
- Directed by: B. Reeves Eason
- Written by: Dorrell McGowan; Stuart E. McGowan
- Starring: Gene Autry; Smiley Burnette; Frances Grant
- Cinematography: William Nobles
- Edited by: Carl Pierson
- Production company: Republic Pictures
- Distributed by: Republic Pictures
- Release date: March 2, 1936 (U.S.)
- Running time: 59 minutes
- Country: United States
- Language: English

Red River Valley, later retitled Man of the Frontier for American television screening, is a 1936 American Western film directed by B. Reeves Eason and starring Gene Autry, Smiley Burnette, and Frances Grant. Written by Dorrell and Stuart E. McGowan, the film is about a "ditch rider" and his sidekick who set out to find out who has been causing the accidents at a dam construction site.

== Plot ==
In Red River Valley, Banker Hartley Moore (Frank LaRue) schemes to sabotage the efforts of citizens to secure water rights in order to win water profits for himself. Following the murder of five men who were overseeing the completion of an irrigation system, Gene Autry (Gene Autry) is hired for the dangerous job of "ditch rider", in charge of patrolling the ditches to prevent malfunction or sabotage.

At the Red River Land and Irrigation Company, Steve Conway (Boothe Howard) works for Mary Baxter (Frances Grant) and her father, George Baxter (Sam Flint). Jealous of Mary's attention towards Gene, Conway joins Moore in his scheming actions and hires Bull Dural and his gang to dynamite the water gates and kill the ditch riders.

On his first night on the job, Gene and his friend Frog Millhouse (Smiley Burnette) are almost killed. They apprehend Bull's henchmen and turn them over to the sheriff. Conway and Bull then rob the payroll, accuse Gene of the crime, and encourage Baxter's workmen to revolt by destroying the dam. Gene and Frog go after Bull, while Baxter and the railroad conductor hold off the men at the dam until Gene arrives with Bull and the payroll.

Conway and Moore steal the train in a desperate attempt to escape, but they are killed riding into dynamite. Baxter successfully finishes the irrigation, after which, Gene and Mary ride off on their honeymoon.

== Cast ==
- Gene Autry as Gene Autry
- Smiley Burnette as Frog Millhouse
- Frances Grant (pseudonym used by Stella McCarron) as Mary Baxter
- Boothe Howard as Steve Conway
- Jack Kennedy as Mike, the Train Engineer
- Champion as Gene's Horse
- Sam Flint as George Baxter
- George Chesebro as Bull Dural, Conway's Henchman
- Charles King as Sam, Bull's Dupe
- Eugene Jackson as Iodine
- Edward Hearn as Sheriff Ed
- Frank LaRue as Banker Hartley Moore
- Ken Cooper as Henchman Long
- Frankie Marvin as Henchman Becker

== Production ==
=== Stuntwork ===
- Ken Cooper
- Tracy Layne
- Jay Wilsey
- Joe Yrigoyen

=== Filming locations ===
- Laguna Dam, Yuma, Arizona, USA
- Yuma Territorial Prison State Park, 206 N. Fourth Avenue, Yuma, Arizona, USA
- Yuma, Arizona, USA

=== Soundtrack ===
- "Red River Valley" (Nick Manoloff) by Gene Autry and Smiley Burnette (on guitar) in the saloon
- "Red River Valley" (Nick Manoloff) by Gene Autry, George Chesebro, and men in the saloon
- "Yodeling Cowboy" (Gene Autry) by Gene Autry and Smiley Burnette (on guitar)
- "Instrumental Dance #1" by a band in the saloon, danced by Eugene Jackson
- "Instrumental Dance #2" by a band in the saloon
- "Fetch Me Down My Trusty '45" (Gene Autry, Smiley Burnette) by Smiley Burnette
- "Construction Song (We Love Our Foreman)" by the construction workers
- "Ride of the Valkyrie" (from Die Walküre by Richard Wagner) during the riot at the dam
- "Where a Water Wheel Keeps Turning On" (Oliver Drake, Sam H. Stept) (instrumental)
- "Red River Sweetheart" (Smiley Burnette) (instrumental)
- "Keep Goin' Little Pony" (Smiley Burnette) (instrumental)
- "Rienzi Overture" (Richard Wagner) riot at dam, as train pulls up at lineshack and disgorges the dam's defenders

== Memorable quotes ==
- Gene Autry: If you walk out now, you'll ruin the valley. Everybody will lose their homes, farms. You'll get your money! Baxter's arranging for a loan now and he'll be here to tell you himself.
