= Thunder Mountain (1935 film) =

1935 film by David Howard

- Theatrical release poster
- Directed by: David Howard
- Screenplay by: Daniel Jarrett; Don Swift
- Produced by: Sol Lesser; John Zanft
- Starring: George O'Brien; Barbara Fritchie; Frances Grant; Morgan Wallace; George "Gabby" Hayes; Edward LeSaint
- Cinematography: Frank B. Good
- Edited by: Robert O. Crandall
- Production companies: Fox Film; Sol Lesser Productions
- Distributed by: 20th Century Fox
- Release date: September 27, 1935
- Running time: 68 minutes
- Country: United States
- Language: English

Thunder Mountain is a 1935 American Western film directed by David Howard, written by Daniel Jarrett and Don Swift, and starring George O'Brien, Barbara Fritchie, Frances Grant, Morgan Wallace, George "Gabby" Hayes and Edward LeSaint. It is based on the 1935 novel Thunder Mountain by Zane Grey. The film was released on September 27, 1935, by 20th Century Fox.

== Cast ==
- George O'Brien as Kal Emerson
- Barbara Fritchie as Sydney Blair
- Frances Grant (pseudonym used by Stella McCarron) as Nugget
- Morgan Wallace as Rand Leavitt
- George "Gabby" Hayes as Foley
- Edward LeSaint as Samuel Blair
- Dean Benton as Steve Sloan
- William Bailey as Cliff Borden
- Sid Jordan as Warns Leavitt
