= Cavalry (1936 American film) =

1936 film

- Original film poster
- Directed by: Robert N. Bradbury
- Written by: Robert N. Bradbury (story); George H. Plympton (screenplay)
- Produced by: A.W. Hackel
- Starring: Bob Steele
- Cinematography: Bert Longenecker
- Edited by: S. Roy Luby
- Distributed by: Republic Pictures
- Release date: October 5, 1936
- Running time: 63 minutes
- Country: United States
- Language: English

Cavalry is a 1936 American Western film produced by A.W. Hackel, written and directed by Robert N. Bradbury and starring his son Bob Steele.

== Plot ==
Following General Lee's surrender, Colonel Lafe Harvey, CSA returns to the family plantation to inform his niece Betty Lee that her father, General John Harvey, CSA was killed in a river during a battle. At that moment former guerillas have turned to brigandage where they attack and burn the plantation. Col. Harvey shoots one of them who attempt to attack a female slave. After the skirmish, where their plantation home has been burned to the ground, the Colonel and Betty Lee inform the freed slaves that they will take a wagon train to the West.

Shortly afterwards, Union Army Lieutenant Ted Thorn brings a blinded General Harvey home, as one last favour, the General asks Ted the inform his brother and his daughter of his return. The General does not know the man who saved his life was a Union officer until one of the ex-slaves tells him so.

Lt. Thorn meets President Abraham Lincoln who promotes him to Captain in the US Army and sends him on an undercover mission to stop a new republic from being formed in the West. The same former guerrillas who burned the Harvey plantation are amongst the plotters who consort with the Indians to act as a buffer state for them.

== Cast ==
- Bob Steele as Captain Ted Thorn
- Frances Grant (pseudonym used by Stella McCarron) as Betty Lee Harvey (Holbrook)
- Karl Hackett as Gavin Rance
- Hal Price as Horace Leeds
- Earle Ross as Colonel Lafe Harvey (Holbrook)
- Ed Cassidy as Henchman Bart Haines
- William Welsh as General John Harvey
- Budd Buster as Wagon Boss Jake / President Lincoln

== Soundtrack ==
- Plantation workers in Kentucky - "Massa's Gone Away"
- Wagon train group - "Old Folks at Home"

== See also ==
- List of films and television shows about the American Civil War
- Bob Steele filmography
