= Cleaning Up (1925 film) =

1925 film

- Directed by: Fatty Arbuckle (as William Goodrich)
- Starring: Johnny Arthur
- Release date: November 22, 1925
- Country: United States
- Languages: Silent; English intertitles

Cleaning Up is a 1925 American comedy film directed by Fatty Arbuckle.

== Cast ==
- Johnny Arthur
- Helen Foster (actress)
- George Davis
- Mark Hamilton as Fire Chief Engine 32

== See also ==
- List of American films of 1925
