= Rich Relations (film) =

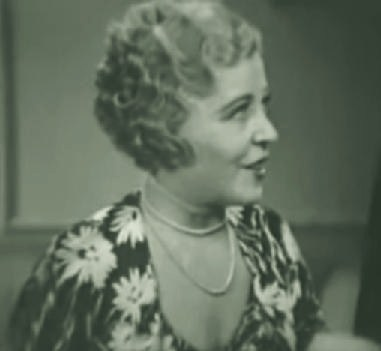
- Silent star Ethel Clayton, as she appeared in the film
- Directed by: Clifford Sanforth
- Screenplay by: Joseph O'Donnell
- Based on: Rich Relations (novel) by Priscilla Wayne
- Produced by: Clifford Sanforth
- Starring: Ralph Forbes; Frances Grant; Barry Norton
- Cinematography: James S. Brown Jr.; Jack Greenhalgh
- Edited by: Henry Spitz
- Production company: Cameo Pictures
- Distributed by: Imperial Distributing Corporation
- Release date: February 1, 1937 (US)
- Running time: 65 minutes
- Country: United States
- Language: English

Rich Relations is a 1937 American comedy film directed by Clifford Sanforth and starring Ralph Forbes, Frances Grant, and Barry Norton. Written by Joseph O'Donnell and based on the novel of the same name by Priscilla Wayne. The film was released in the United States on February 1, 1937.

== Plot ==
A secretary is romanced by a "ladies' man", unaware that her boss is in love with her.

== Cast ==
- Ralph Forbes as Dave Walton
- Frances Grant as Nancy Tilton
- Barry Norton as Don Blair
- Muriel Evans as Trixie Lane
- Franklin Pangborn as Mr. Dwight
- Wesley Barry as Albert
- Jeanie Roberts as Buddy
- Crauford Kent as Mr. Colby
- Ethel Clayton as Mrs. Blair
- Donald Kirke
- Mary Carr
- Ed Lawrence
- Irving White
- Gertrude Astor
- Harry Myers
- Mary MacLaren
- Rosemary Theby
