= Oh, Susanna! (1936 film) =

1936 film

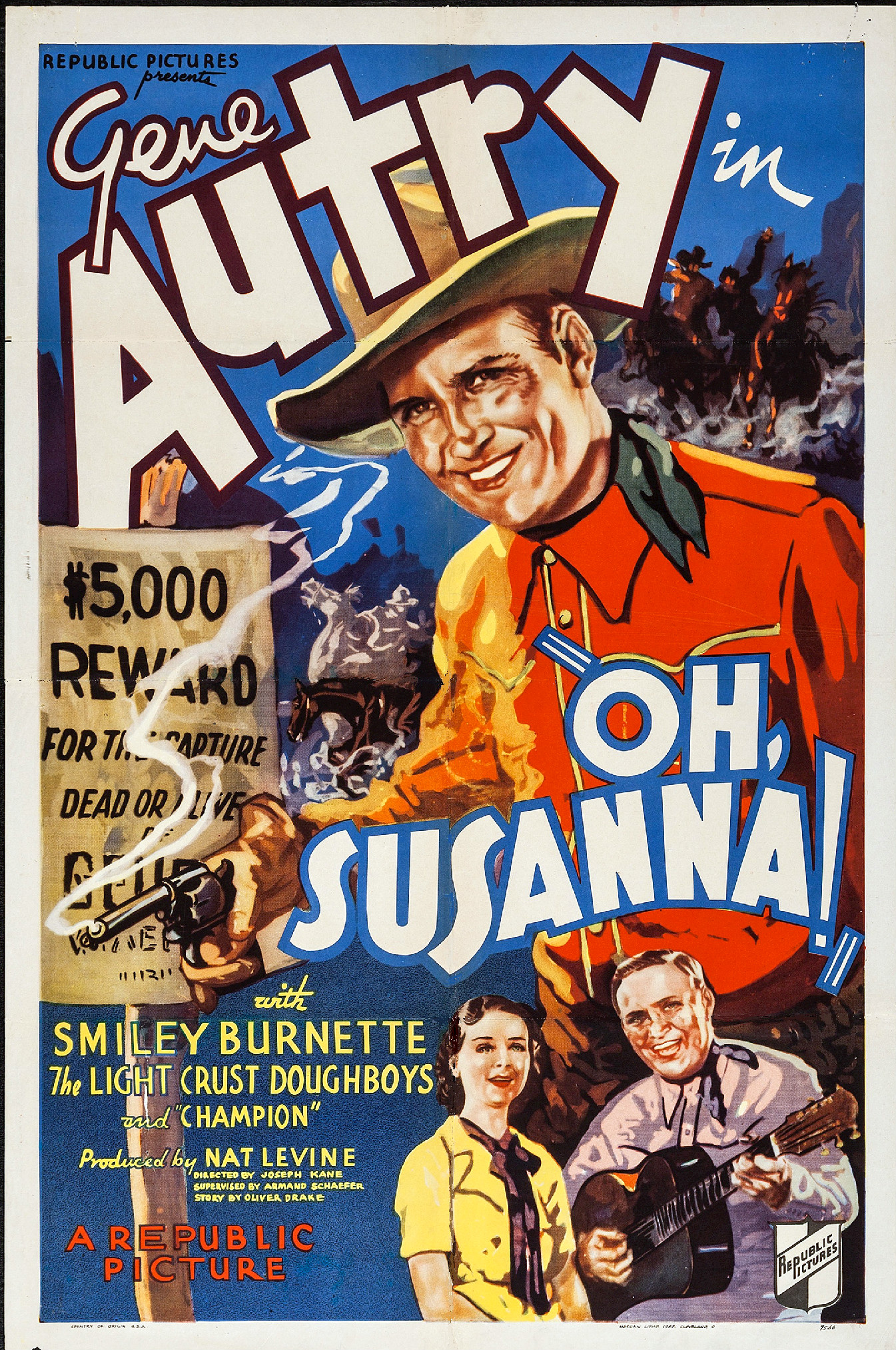
- Theatrical release poster
- Directed by: Joseph Kane
- Written by: Oliver Drake
- Produced by: Nat Levine
- Starring: Gene Autry; Smiley Burnette; Frances Grant
- Cinematography: William Nobles
- Edited by: Lester Orlebeck
- Music by: Harry Grey (supervisor)
- Production company: Republic Pictures
- Distributed by: Republic Pictures
- Release date: August 19, 1936 (U.S.)
- Running time: 54 minutes
- Country: United States
- Language: English

Oh, Susanna! is a 1936 American Western film directed by Joseph Kane and starring Gene Autry, Smiley Burnette, and Frances Grant. Written by Oliver Drake, the film is about a cowboy who is robbed and then thrown from a train by an escaped murderer who then takes on the cowboy's identity.

This film takes its title from the well known minstrel song "Oh! Susanna" by Stephen Foster. The pre-Civil war‘ song's original racist lyrics have long been omitted, erroneously re-making it as a Western song.

== Plot ==
Singing cowboy Gene Autry (Gene Autry) is traveling to Mineral Springs Ranch to visit an old friend, Jefferson Lee (Carl Stockdale), whom he hasn't seen in fifteen years. On the train, he is robbed and then thrown from the train by escaped murderer Wolf Benson (Boothe Howard). Believing Gene to be dead, Wolf plans to travel to Mineral Springs Ranch and pose as the radio celebrity in order to collect the $10,000 that Lee owes Gene.

Meanwhile, Gene is rescued by traveling actors Frog Millhouse (Smiley Burnette) and Professor Ezekial Daniels (Earle Hodgins). Together they travel to Sage City, where Gene gets into a fight with Sheriff Briggs (Walter James), who believes he is Wolf, and chokes the singing cowboy. Arrested for Wolf's crimes, Gene is unable to sing in order to prove his identity. At the trial, Gene mouths the words to his songs while a phonograph plays, and after the jury listens, Gene is set free.

Wolf arrives at Lee's Mineral Springs Ranch pretending to be Gene and asks for his money back. Knowing he is an impostor, Lee refuses to give him the money and Wolf shoots him and robs his safe. On his way to Mineral Springs, Gene comes across a posted reward for "Gene Autry", the murderer of Jefferson Lee. Gene meets Lee's niece Mary Ann (Frances Grant), who is riding with Flash Baldwin (Donald Kirke), Wolf's accomplice. Gene notices that Baldwin is wearing his own suit, and decides to pose as Tex Smith, offering to perform at the Lee ranch in place of Gene Autry. After finding his suitcase in Baldwin's room, Gene overhears Wolf's scheme to rob the ranch safe, but Baldwin recognizes Gene's voice by playing his record while he sings.

The next day, while the guests picnic, Wolf and his men crack the ranch safe. Gene pulls a gun on them, but Sheriff Briggs and his posse arrive with Frog and Daniels. He arrests Gene, instead of Wolf, still believing that Gene killed Lee. While the posse locates Mary Ann to implicate Wolf, he deserts his men and Gene overtakes him in his car. Mary Ann then testifies to Gene's innocence and they kiss.

== Cast ==
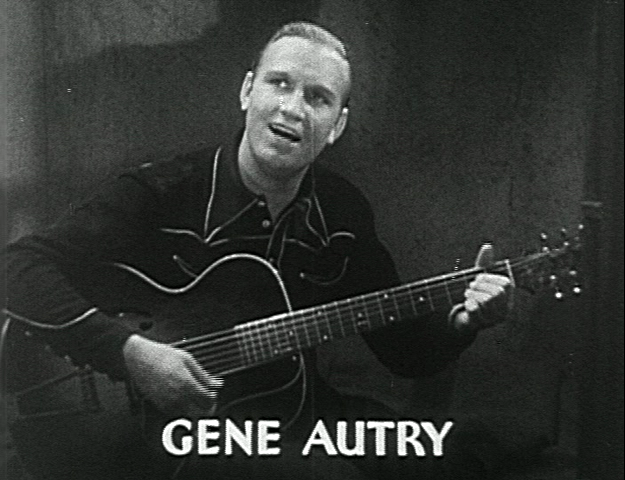
Gene Autry in Oh, Susanna!, 1936

- Gene Autry as Gene Autry / Tex Smith
- Smiley Burnette as Frog Millhouse
- Frances Grant (pseudonym used by Stella McCarron) as Mary Ann Lee
- Earle Hodgins as Professor Ezekial Daniels
- Donald Kirke as Flash Baldwin
- Boothe Howard as Wolf Benson
- The Light Crust Doughboys as Western Band
- Champion as Champion, Autry's Horse
- Clara Kimball Young as Aunt Peggy Lee
- Edward Peil Sr. as Mineral Springs Sheriff
- Frankie Marvin as Henchman Hank
- Carl Stockdale as Jefferson Lee
- Roscoe Gerald as Irate Farmer
- Roger Gray as Sage City Judge
- Fred Burns as Cottonwood Sheriff Jones
- Walter James as Sage City Sheriff Briggs
- Lew Meehan as Henchman Pete
- Fred Snowflake Toones as Train Porter

== Production ==
=== Stuntwork ===
- Yakima Canutt
- Tommy Coats
- Jay Wilsey
- Joe Yrigoyen

=== Filming locations ===
- Alabama Hills, Lone Pine, California, USA
- Kernville, California, USA
- Saugus Train Depot, Saugus, California, USA

=== Soundtrack ===
- "Oh! Susanna" (Stephen Foster) opening credits medley
- "Oh! Susanna" (Stephen Foster) by Gene Autry, Smiley Burnette, and Earle Hodgins (a cappella)
- "Oh! Susanna" (Stephen Foster) by Smiley Burnette (accordion)
- "Oh! Susanna" (Stephen Foster) by The Light Crust Doughboys
- "Jeanie with the Light Brown Hair" (Stephen Foster) opening credits medley
- "Gwine to Rune All Night (De Camptown Races)" (Stephen Foster) opening credits medley
- "Old Folks at Home (Swanee River)" (Stephen Foster) opening credits medley
- "Dear Old Western Skies" (Gene Autry) by Gene Autry
- "Honeymoon Trail" by Gene Autry
- "Tiger Rag" (Edwin B. Edwards, Nick LaRocca, Tony Sbarbaro, Henry Ragas, Larry Shields, Harry DeCosta) by The Light Crust Doughboys
- "They Never Come Through with the Ring" by Smiley Burnette and Earle Hodgins with The Light Crust Doughboys
- "Ride On Vaquero" (Abel Baer, L. Wolfe Gilbert) by The Light Crust Doughboys
- "Water Wheel" (Sam H. Stept) by Gene Autry and Frances Grant with Autry on guitar
- "As Our Pals Ride By" by The Light Crust Doughboys

== Memorable quotes ==
- Gene Autry a.k.a. Tex Smith: But I tell you, I'm Gene Autry!

Deputy Sheriff: And I'm Bing Crosby. [singing] Boo-boo-boo-boo!
Frog Millhouse: Boo-boo yourself.
