= Sweet Sixteen (1928 film) =

1928 film

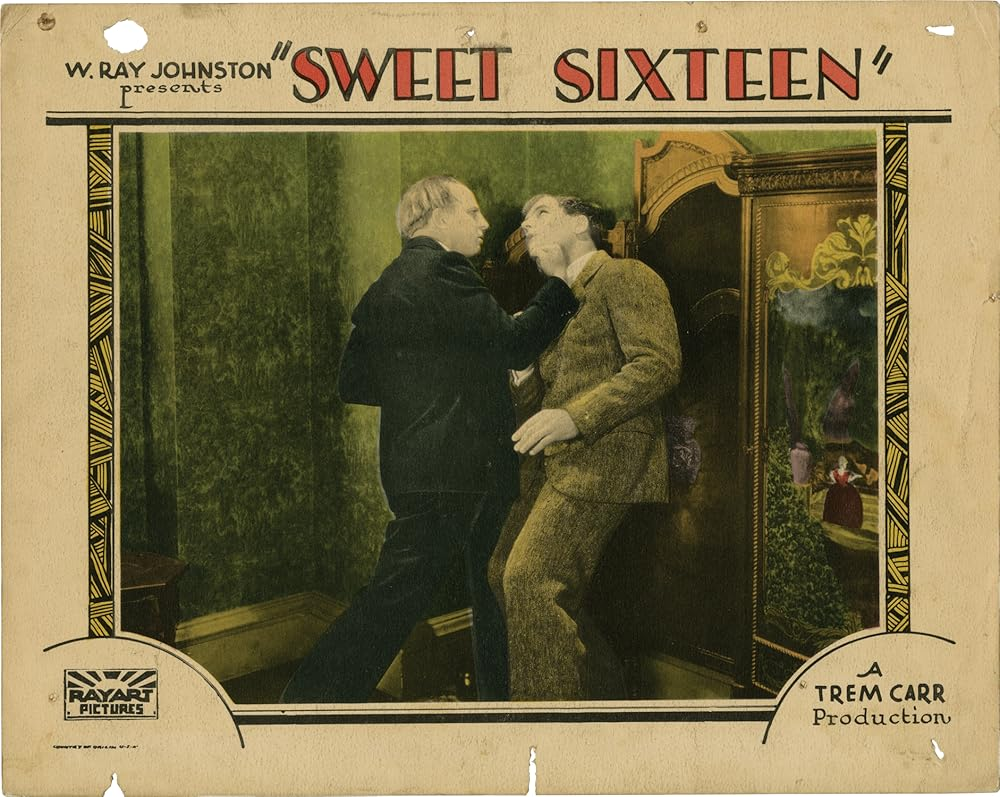
- Directed by: Scott Pembroke
- Written by: Phyllis Duganne; Arthur Hoerl
- Produced by: Trem Carr
- Starring: Helen Foster; Gertrude Olmstead; Gladden James
- Cinematography: Walter L. Griffin
- Edited by: J.S. Harrington
- Production company: Trem Carr Pictures
- Distributed by: Rayart Pictures
- Release date: August 1928
- Running time: 60 minutes
- Country: United States
- Languages: Silent; English intertitles

Sweet Sixteen is a 1928 American silent drama film directed by Scott Pembroke and starring Helen Foster, Gertrude Olmstead and Gladden James. It was distributed by the independent Rayart Pictures, the forerunner of Monogram Pictures.

== Synopsis ==
When her younger sister Cynthia becomes entangled with the caddish Howard De Hart, Patricia tries to persuade her away from his clutches. When this is no good she decides to break them up even if it means compromising her own reputation at the risk of losing her own boyfriend.

== Cast ==
- Helen Foster as Cynthia Perry
- Gertrude Olmstead as Patricia Perry
- Gladden James as Howard De Hart
- Lydia Yeamans Titus as Grandma Perry
- Reginald Sheffield as Tommy Lowell
- William H. Tooker as Patrick Perry

== Bibliography ==
- Connelly, Robert B. The Silents: Silent Feature Films, 1910-36, Volume 40, Issue 2. December Press, 1998.
