= Frances Grant =

American actress (1909–1982)

Stella McCarron
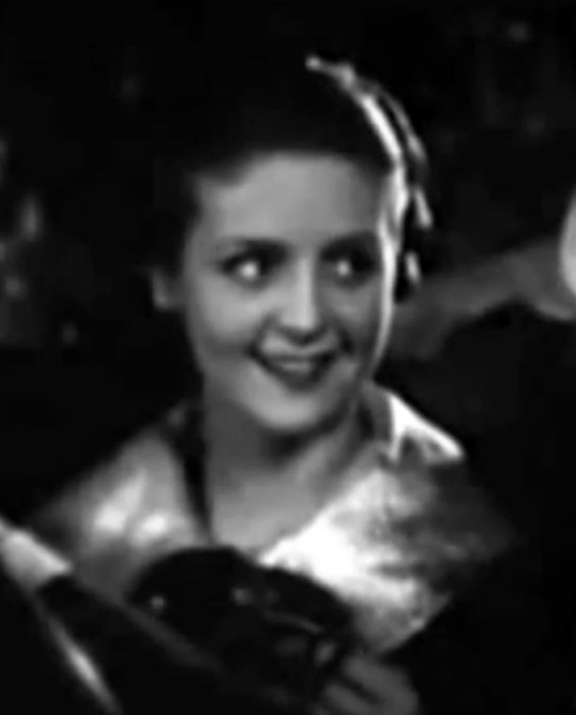
- McCarron (a.k.a.Frances Grant) in Rich Relations 1937
- Born: Stella Theophane Fortier; March 15, 1913; Roxbury, Massachusetts, USA
- Died: February 20, 1982 (aged 68); Lexington, Massachusetts, US
- Other names: Theo Phane; Frances Grant
- Occupations: Actress, dancer
- Spouse: James F. McCarron (m. 1939–1982)
- Children: 2

Stella Fortier McCarron, better known by her performance name Frances Grant, (March 15, 1913 – February 20, 1982) was an American actress, dancer, and dance teacher. Born Stella Theophane Fortier, she began her career using the stage name Theo Phane (taken from her middle name) which she used while working as a dancer on Broadway, including in the Ziegfeld Follies. She changed her stage name to Frances Grant when appearing in the 1931 Broadway drama Cold in Sables, and it is under this name that she had a career as a film actress. She appeared as the leading lady of Gene Autry in Red River Valley (1936) and Oh, Susanna! (1936) and other B-films such as Thunder Mountain (1935) and Cavalry (1936). After marrying the American boxer Jimmy McCarron, she became a well known dance teacher in Massachusetts from the late 1940s until her retirement in 1970. She founded her own dance school in Boston, the Stella Fortier McCarron School of Dance, and also operated dance studios in Lexington and Concord. She died in Lexington at the age of 68.

== Biography ==
The daughter of Mr. and Mrs. Alfred H. Fortier, Stella Theophane Fortier was born on March 15, 1913, in Roxbury, Boston, Massachusetts. She graduated from Somerville High School in 1930. She studied dancing with the Corbett sisters with whom she worked in variety theatre. She acted in stock theater after high school, and moved to New York City in late 1930.

In her early career as a dancer, Stella used the stage name Theo Fane (derived from her middle name). In the early 1930s, she performed with this name on Broadway in the musical revues Ballyhoo of 1930 and the Ziegfeld Follies of 1931, and the musical Hot-Cha! (1932). In the Ziegfeld Follies she was the dancing partner of Hal Le Roy. For the Broadway play Cold in Sables (1931) she adopted the moniker of Frances Grant for her first appearance in a dramatic role, the role of Mobelia.

In 1932 Stella and Lucille Ball were both plucked out of the Ziegfeld Follies by Hollywood scouts to come to California for screen tests. In 1934, she began her film career with uncredited roles as a dancer in the Kentucky Kernels (1934) and The Nitwits (1935). It was determined that she would be used as a dramatic actress using the name Frances Grant. She first used this name on screen in the Will Rogers film Doubting Thomas (1935); a work in which she portrayed the supporting part of Peggy Burns who is accosted by a swindler.

As Frances Grant she had her first major film role, the part of Nugget, in the 1935 Western film Thunder Mountain opposite George O'Brien. In the following year she appeared as the leading lady of Gene Autry in Red River Valley (1936) and Oh, Susanna! (1936). In the latter film, Grant sings a duet with Autry on the song "Water Wheel" with Autry accompanying them on guitar. That same year she had leading roles in Born to Fight with Frankie Darro, The Traitor with Tim McCoy, and Cavalry opposite Bob Steele. Her last leading role was in Rich Relations (1937). She appeared in three additional films as a dancer uncredited. In the 1940s and 1950s, Grant worked as a dance director in films such as Masquerade in Mexico (1945), Mrs. Mike (1949), and Fancy Pants (1950).

In 1939 Stella married the American boxer James "Jimmy" F. McCarron who had been a part of the American team at the 1932 Summer Olympics. The pair knew each other from their childhood, having attended the same schools in Somerville and dating each other in high school. The couple had two daughters, Phyllis and Linda.

McCarron continued to work as a dancer, actress, and nightclub performer in Boston into the 1940s. She founded the Stella Fortier McCarron School of Dance in Boston, and was a member of both the Boston Dance Guild and Dance Masters of America. She also operated dance studios in Lexington, Massachusetts and Concord, Massachusetts. She retired from teaching in 1970, and lived the last 25 years of her life in Lexington.

Stella McCarron died in Lexington, Massachusetts, on February 20, 1982, at the age of 68.

== Filmography ==
- Kentucky Kernels (1934) Kentucky Belle (uncredited)
- The Nitwits (1935) Hoofer (uncredited)
- Doubting Thomas (1934) Peggy Burns
- Thunder Mountain (1935) Nugget
- The Oregon Trail (1936) Settler Girl (uncredited)
- Dancing Feet (1936) Dance Hall (uncredited)
- Red River Valley (1936) Mary Baxter
- Born to Fight (1936) Nan Howard
- Oh, Susanna! (1936) Mary Ann Lee
- The Traitor (1936) Mary Allen
- Cavalry (1936) Betty Lee Harvey
- Rich Relations (1937) Nancy Tilton
- Top of the Town (1937) Dancer (uncredited)
- Bride by Mistake (1944) Dancing Instructress (uncredited)
- Gypsy Holiday (Short) (1948) Specialty Dancer
- Artists and Models (1955) Dancer (uncredited)
