= Helen Foster (actress) =

American actress (1906–1982)

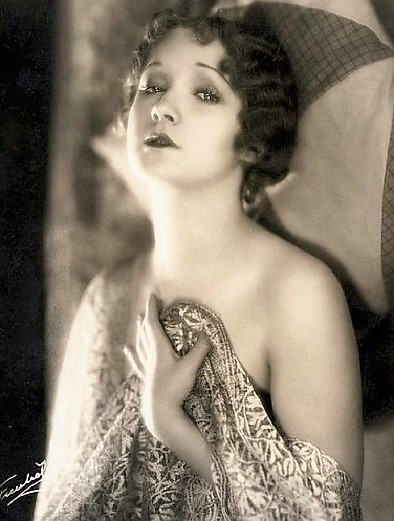
- Foster in 1930
- Born: May 23, 1906; Independence, Kansas, U.S.
- Died: December 25, 1982 (aged 76); Los Angeles, California, U.S.
- Occupation: Actress
- Years active: 1925–1956

Helen Foster (May 23, 1906 – December 25, 1982) was an American film actress.

== Early life and career ==
Born in Independence, Kansas, Foster attended school in Kansas City and later attended finishing school in Florida. She began acting in 1924, appearing in comedy shorts and early Westerns. In 1929, she had a role in her first sound film Gold Diggers of Broadway, and was also named a WAMPAS Baby Star that same year. In 1933, Foster starred in the exploitation film Road to Ruin, a remake of the 1928 film of the same name in which Foster also starred. Following the release of Road to Ruin, Foster made only eight more film appearances in mostly uncredited roles. She made her last onscreen appearance as an extra in the 1956 film Around the World in 80 Days.

Foster died on Christmas Day, 1982, in Los Angeles at the age of 76.

== Filmography ==
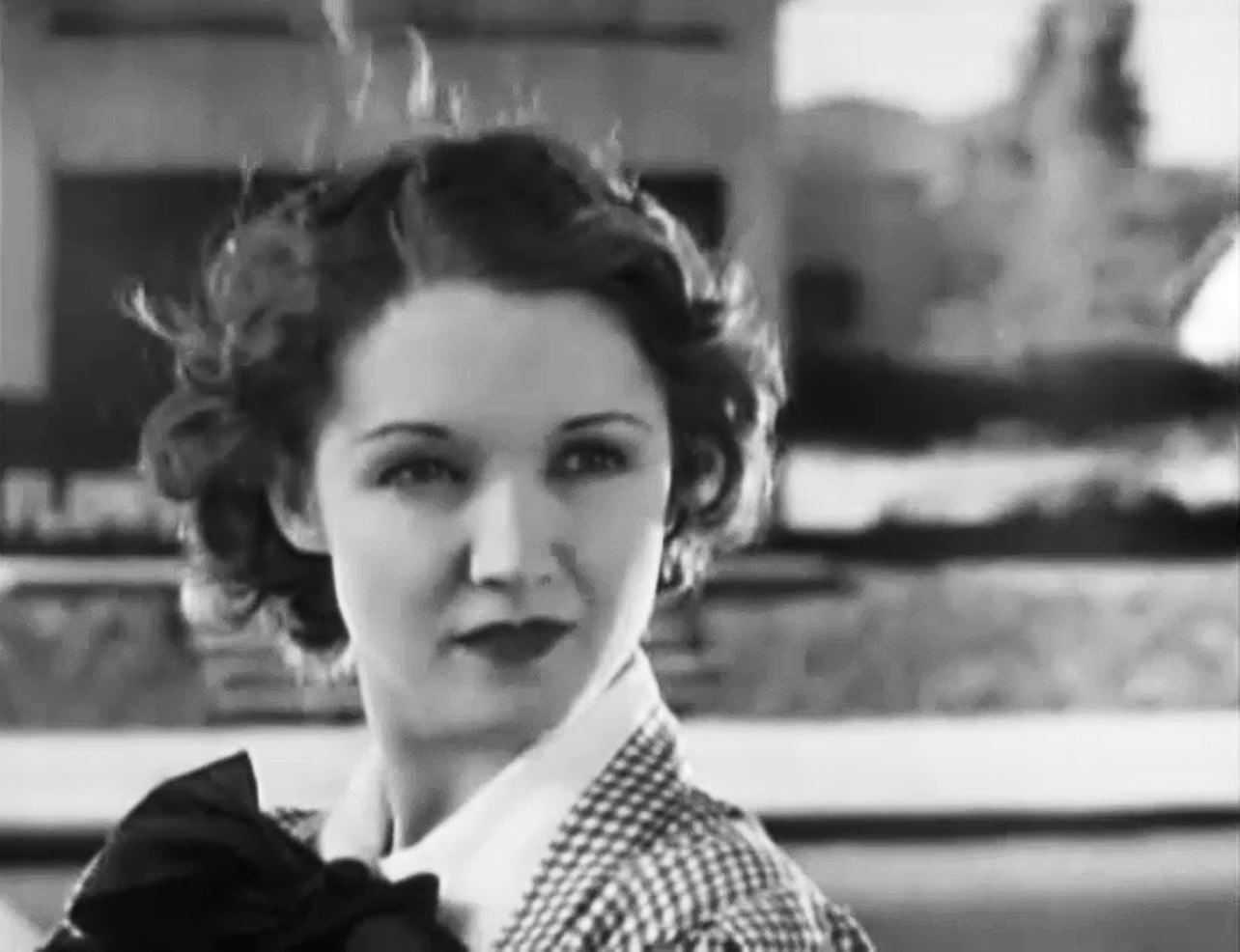
Foster in The Road to Ruin (1934)

Year	Title	Role	Notes
1925	On the Go	Nell Hall	
1925	Reckless Courage	Doris Bayne	Alternative title: Flying Courage
1925	The Bandit's Baby	Esther Lacy	
1925	The Tourist		
1925	Cleaning Up	Wife	
1925	Maid in Morocco	The Bride	
1926	Move Along	The Girl	
1927	California or Bust	Nadine Holtwood	
1927	The Courage of Collins	Rose Foster	
1927	When a Dog Loves	Agnes Flanagan	
1927	Naughty Nanette	Lucy Dennison	
1927	The Outlaw Dog	Helen Meadows	
1927	Hands Off	Myra Perkins	
1928	13 Washington Square	Mary Morgan	
1928	The Road to Ruin	Sally Canfield	
1928	Haunted Island	Rosalind Joy	
1928	Won in the Clouds	Grace James	
1928	Hellship Bronson	Mary Younger	
1928	The Mating Call	Jessie Peebles	
1928	Sweet Sixteen	Cynthia Perry	
1928	Should a Girl Marry?	Alice Dunn	
1929	The Sky Skidder	Stella Hearns	
1929	Linda	Linda	
1929	Circumstantial Evidence	Jean Benton	
1929	Hoofbeats of Vengeance	Mary Martin	
1929	The Harvest of Hate	Margie Smith	
1929	Gold Diggers of Broadway	Violet Dayne	
1929	So Long Letty	Sally Davis	
1929	Painted Faces	Nancy	
1929	Irish Fantasy		
1929	Finders Keepers	Ninon	
1931	Primrose Path	Molly Malone	
1931	Is There Justice?	June Lawrence	
1932	Ghost City	Laura Martin	
1932	Temptation's Workshop	Connie Lawton	Alternative title: Youths Highways
1932	Sinister Hands	Vivian Rogers	
1932	The Saddle Buster	Sunny Hurn	
1932	The Boiling Point	Lora Kirk	
1932	Young Blood	Gail Winters	Alternative title: Lola
1932	The Big Flash	Nadine's maid	
1932	Lucky Larrigan	Virginia Bailey	
1934	The Road to Ruin	Ann Dixon	
1934	School for Girls	Eleanor	
1939	North of Shanghai	Undetermined Role	Uncredited
1940	The Westerner	Janice	Uncredited
1942	Parachute Nurse	Company "C" Girl	Uncredited
1948	Call Northside 777	Secretary	Uncredited; Alternative title: Calling Northside 777
1948	Good Sam		Uncredited
1952	Never Wave at a WAC	Captain Finch	Uncredited; Alternative title: The Private Wore Skirts
1956	Around the World in 80 Days	Extra	Uncredited
