= Born to Fight (1936 film) =

1936 film directed by Charles Hutchison

- Directed by: Charles Hutchison
- Screenplay by: Stephen Norris
- Based on: "To Him Who Dares"; 1911 story in The Saturday Evening Post by Peter B. Kyne
- Produced by: Maurice Conn; Martin G. Cohn
- Starring: Frankie Darro; Kane Richmond; Jack LaRue
- Cinematography: Arthur Reed
- Edited by: Richard G. Wray
- Music by: Didheart Conn
- Production company: Conn Pictures
- Release date: November 3, 1936 (US)
- Running time: 58 minutes
- Country: United States
- Language: English

Born to Fight is a 1936 American drama film directed by Charles Hutchison from a screenplay by Stephen Norris, based on the short story, "To Him Who Dares" by Peter B. Kyne. The film stars Frankie Darro, Kane Richmond, and Jack LaRue.

== Plot ==
Tom Brown, known as "The Bomber", is a professional lightweight boxer. One night he is out at a nightclub when he gets involved in a fight with a local gangster, "Smoothy" Morgan, over fixing a fight. When Tom knocks Smoothy down, everyone believes the gangster to be dead. On the advice of his manager, Gloomy Gus, Tom flees New York City, heading to Chicago. On the way he meets a young unknown boxer, "Baby Face" Madison, and he agrees to train him, but uses the alias of Tom Hayes. He goes to a local gym in Chicago where he used to train, where he finds out that the former owner has died, and the gym is now run by his daughter, Nan Howard. Nan thinks she remembers Tom, but is not sure. As Tom trains Baby Face as a flyweight, he begins to have some success in the ring, winning his first fight. After the fight, the police arrive, looking for Tom Brown, and question Nan, but she does not tell the police that she thinks she recognizes Tom. After his initial successes, Baby Face is offered a shot at the title in Madison Square Garden. Tom warns him that he is not ready, but his hubris makes Baby Face ignore Tom's warning. He does not know that Baby Face's opponent has been paid off to take a fall. However, because he is so unprepared, Baby Face loses the fight and returns to Chicago in disgrace, finding it difficult to get bouts.

Back in the ring, Baby Face, using Tom's tutelage and techniques, once again begins his ascent. He gets to the point where he is legitimately good enough to try to attempt the big time in Madison Square Garden once again. However, the press has become suspicious of the close resemblance between Baby Face's boxing style and that of Tom Brown. So as to not expose himself, Tom has Gus pose as Baby Face's manager. As the fight nears, Tom and Gus are approached by Morgan, who has faked his death. He offers to "return to life", thus clearing Tom's name, in exchange for them getting Baby Face to throw the fight. They reluctantly agree, but do not tell Baby Face, who they do not think will win the fight anyway. During the fight, however, Tom comes to the ring, exposing himself to the police, in order to cheer on Baby Face, who wins the bout. The loss proves deadly to Morgan, who cannot cover his losses with the mob, and they kill him, inadvertently clearing Tom, who ends up with Nan.

== Cast ==
- Frankie Darro as "Baby Face" Madison
- Kane Richmond as Tom "Bomber" Brown/Tom Hayes
- Jack LaRue as "Smoothy" (billed as Jack La Rue)
- Frances Grant (pseudonym used by Stella McCarron) as Nan Howard
- Sheila Bromley as Sheila MannorsAda
- Monte F. Collins as "Gloomy Gus" (billed as Monty Collins)
- Eddie Phillips as Duffy
- Fred Toones as Snowflake (billed as Snowflake)
- Philo McCullough as Goodall
- Hal Price as Heckler

== Production ==
The picture was originally titled, Johnnie Gets His Gun, but the name was changed to its final title in April 1936, and Madeleine Ruthven was assigned to write the script. However, the writing duties were reassigned to Stephen Norris, who adapted it from the short story, "To Him Who Dares", by Peter B. Kyne, which appeared in the Saturday Evening Post in the December 23, 1911 issue. While AFI's database gives a release date of November 3, 1936, contemporaneous sources state the film had an April 13 release. Variety was reporting gross receipts information as early as May 1936.

In February 1936 it was announced that Frankie Darro was attached to the project. While AFI and certain contemporaneous sources such as The Film Daily say the screenplay adaptation was credited to Stephen Norris, other contemporaneous sources such as Variety and Photoplay list Sascha Baraniev as the screenwriter.

== Reception ==
The Film Daily gave the picture a favorable review, saying that the film "ranks with the best of independent products, and can hold its own with some of the program major releases of this type." They applauded the action, specifically the fight scenes, felt the direction was well-paced, based on a solid script. They said the film was well-acted, with good romantic elements, with good cinematography. The Motion Picture Herald also gave the film a good review saying, "This lower bracket programmer is head and shoulders above its predecessors in the Frankie Darro Series. In fact, it is almost as good as some of the major company efforts and better than several we have seen."
