= The Monster (1925 film) =

1925 film by Roland West

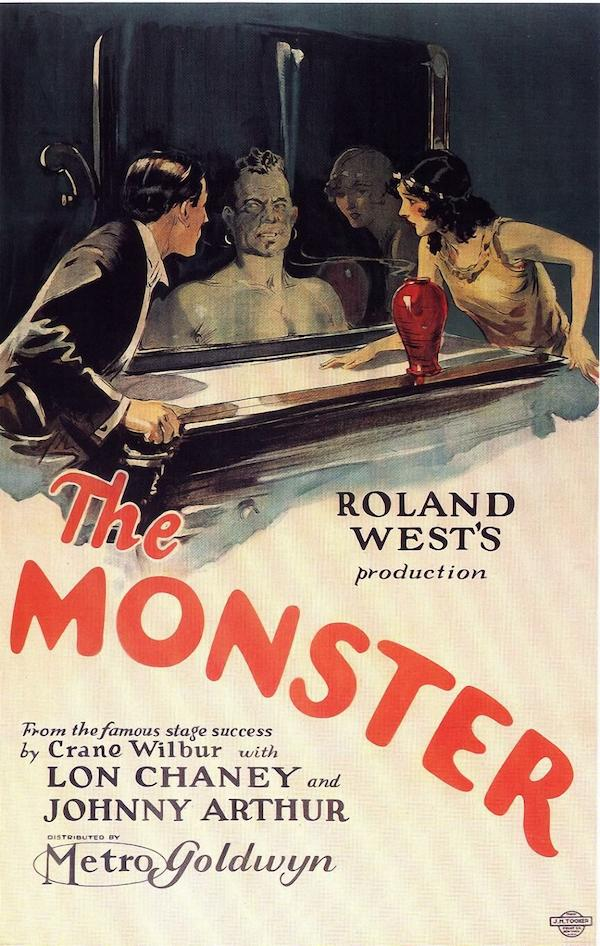
- Theatrical release poster
- Directed by: Roland West
- Written by: Willard Mack; Albert Kenyon
- Based on: The Monster; 1922 play by Crane Wilbur
- Produced by: Roland West
- Starring: Lon Chaney; Johnny Arthur; Gertrude Olmstead
- Cinematography: Hal Mohr
- Distributed by: Metro-Goldwyn Pictures
- Release date: February 22, 1925
- Running time: 86 minutes
- Country: United States
- Language: Silent (English intertitles)

The Monster is a 1925 American silent horror-comedy film directed by Roland West, based on the stage play of the same name by Crane Wilbur, and starring Lon Chaney and comedian Johnny Arthur. The screenplay was written by Willard Mack and Albert Kenyon. It is remembered as an early prototype "old dark house" movie, as well as a precedent to a number of horror film subgenres such as mad scientists with imbecilic assistants. Some sources list the film's release date as March 1925, while others say February.

The film has been shown on TCM network with an alternative and uncredited musical score. West later went on to direct The Bat (1926) and its later sound remake The Bat Whispers (1930).

Although it earned only $55,600 for the week ending on February 18, 1925, the film could be considered the first horror film in history to top the North American box office because the gross reported by Variety was the highest amount listed for that week in theaters nationwide. The movie was made by Roland West Productions and Tec-Art and distributed by MGM. The film was released with lavish color tints that enhanced the eerie mood. The film's tagline was "A mystery thriller and a love adventure. The romance of a boy and a girl in a mansion of hidden motives. You'll Guess! You'll Gasp! You'll love it! A Mansion of Many Doors – A House of Strange Shadows – What lies beyond the door? WHAT does it mean? Who can solve it? You'll keep guessing until the very end."

The Monster (1925)

== Plot ==
John Bowman, a wealthy farmer, is kidnapped one night after two mysterious men lure his car off the road. When the wreckage is discovered the next day, constable Russ Mason forms a search party with Amos Rugg and Johnny Goodlittle. Johnny has just graduated from crime school, receiving a diploma as an amateur detective.

Amos and Johnny work at the general store in Danburg. Both are in love with Betty Watson, the storeowner's daughter. Attempting to woo Betty, Amos invites her on a drive in the country. Meanwhile, Johnny has followed a mysterious stranger to the country. The strange man has lured Amos' car off the road and kidnapped the couple. Johnny accidentally enters a hidden tunnel, and all three end up at Dr Edwards' sanitarium.

Once inside, they are greeted by Dr. Gustave Ziska, who introduces Rigo, Caliban, and Daffy Dan, his three patients. Ziska explains that he took control of the asylum after it had closed. Amos, Johnny, and Betty are captured and sent to a dungeon, wherein Johnny finds Dr. Edwards and John Bowman have been kidnapped by Dr. Ziska and his cronies.

Dr. Edwards tells Johnny that Ziska, Caliban, Rigo and Daffy Dan were once his patients in the sanitarium. Ziska had been a great surgeon who went mad and began to perform unorthodox operations. He now intends to perform experiments on Betty and Amos, attempting to discover the secret of eternal life.

Amos and Johnny are captured and brought to Ziska's laboratory, where Betty lies fastened to a surgical bed. Amos is strapped to the "death chair" and connected to Betty through a transducer, which will exchange their souls. Johnny eludes Ziska's henchmen and escapes up to the roof, sending flares seen by policemen investigating the wreckage of Amos' car.

Having escaped, Johnny disguises himself as Rigo and begins to assist the doctor. He frees Betty and Amos and straps Ziska to his own death chair. Caliban appears and, mistaking the figure in the chair for Amos, activates the transducer, removing Ziska's soul from his body. Because there is no one on the surgical bed, there is no soul to complete the exchange, and Ziska is rendered completely lifeless.

Realizing his mistake, Caliban is distracted and Johnny captures him by hooking a winch to the monster's feet and hoisting him upside down. The policemen enter the laboratory to find that Johnny has successfully apprehended the madmen and located the kidnapped people. He gains the police department's respect as a detective and wins Betty's heart and hand.

== Cast ==
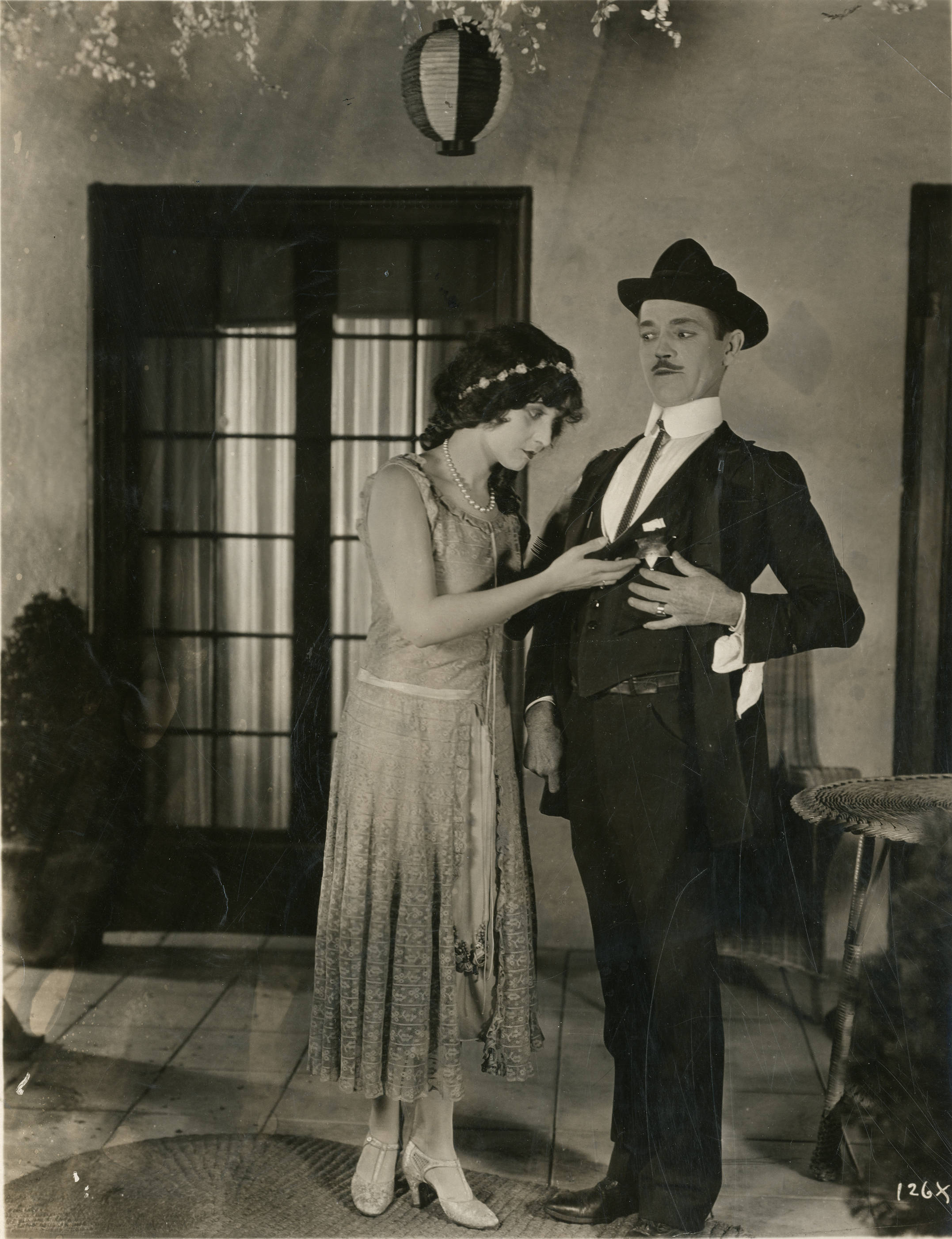
Gertrude Olmstead.

- Lon Chaney as Dr. Gustave Ziska
- Johnny Arthur as Johnny Goodlittle, amateur detective
- Gertrude Olmstead as Betty Watson
- Hallam Cooley as Amos Rugg
- Charles Sellon as Russ Mason, a constable
- Walter James as Caliban
- Knute Erickson as Daffy Dan
- George Austin as Rigo
- Edward McWade as Luke Watson, Betty's father
- Ethel Wales as Mrs Watson, Betty's mother
- Elmo Billings as Freckle-Faced Kid (uncredited)
- Herbert Prior as Dr. Edwards (uncredited)
- Matthew Betz as Detective Jennings (uncredited)
- Dorothy Vernon as Townswoman at Accident Scene (uncredited)
- William H. Turner as Detective Jennings (uncredited)

== Genre ==
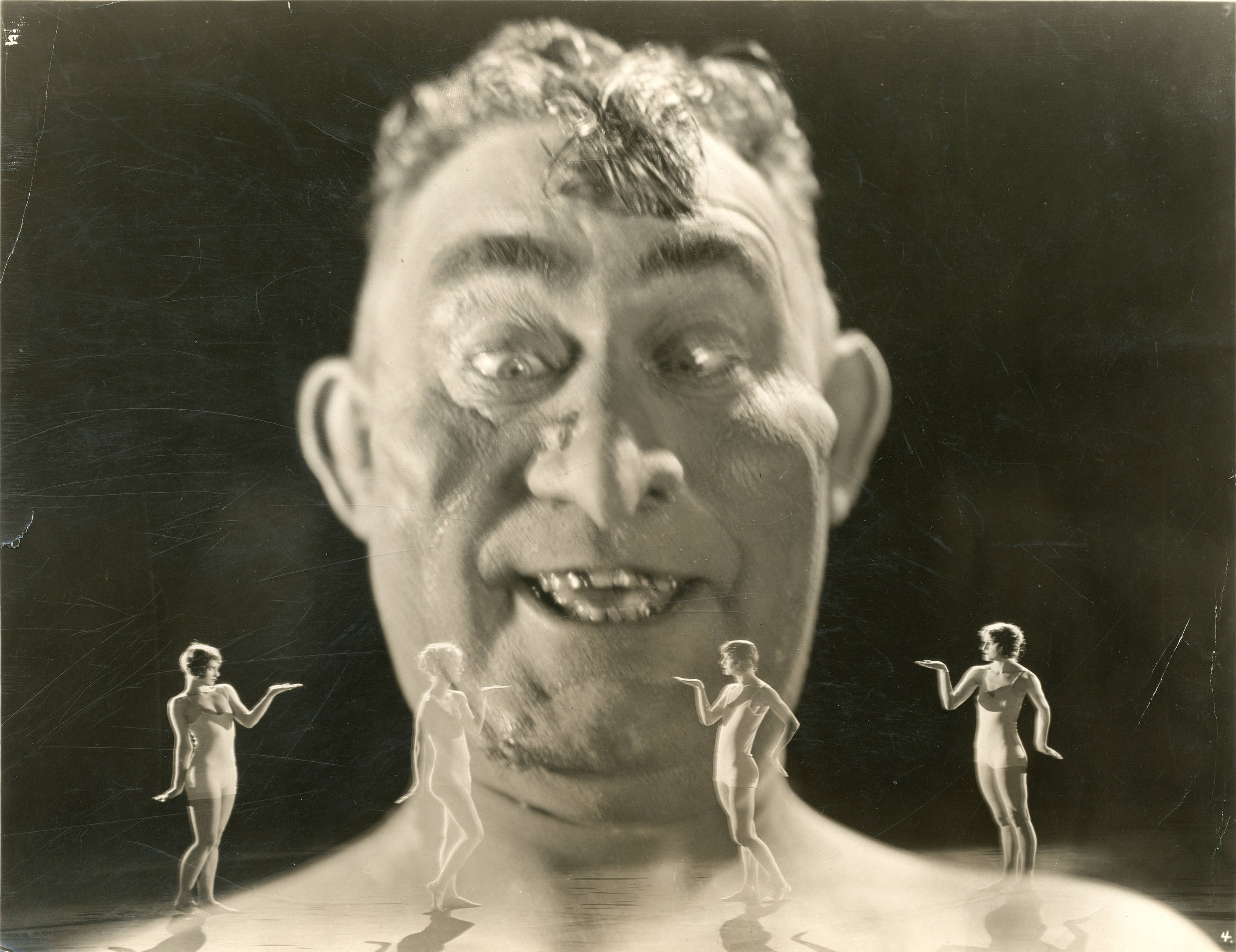
Still from the film with Walter James.

The genre and cinematic style of The Monster is ambiguous. It stands as an early mad scientist movie. The picture also stands as an early example of an '"old dark house" movie, even preceding The Old Dark House (1932).

A distinguishing quality of The Monster which deviates from most horror films is its use of subtle humour in serious or dramatic situations. As in many conventional comedies, the protagonist Johnny Goodlittle is a comic relief character. He is also an early example of an effeminate, cowardly hero, as the actor Johnny Arthur usually played.

Critic Troy Howarth stated "Viewers expecting a typical Lon Chaney vehicle are in for a major disappointment, as the actor doesn't show up into well into the picture. And while he admittedly makes for an alarming presence...it's not much of a role and doesn't allow him to evoke the kind of audience empathy one normally associates with the great actor."

== Reception ==
"As always, Lon Chaney does excellent work in an unusual character role. He appears as the sinister surgeon in charge and scores heavily although his role is secondary to that of Johnny Arthur as the boob detective." ---Moving Picture World

"'The Monster' was a corking stage thriller. As a picture it proves to be somewhat suspenseful, but it seemingly is played too fast to get the full effectiveness that there was in the play...Lon Chaney does not make the crazed surgeon as terrifying a picture as he might have, and in that the film lets down to a certain extent." ---Variety

"The starch seems to have been taken out of the pictorial conception of THE MONSTER by the inclusion of too much light comedy. The result is that, although this film possesses a degree of queer entertainment, it is neither fish, fowl nor good red herring. The thrills that might have chilled one's feet and finger tips end in causing chuckles and giggles...Mr. Chaney does not have very much to do, but his various appearances are effective...Chaney looks as if he could have enjoyed a more serious portrayal of the theme." ---The New York Times

"The Monster seems to us to be Lon Chaney's best part of recent years, because his art comes from within, not without...In The Monster, he appears as himself with no disfiguring makeup....a thrilling picture"--- Movie Weekly

"An entertaining comedy and mystery play...but it will prove too gruesome for tender-hearted people." ---Harrison's Reports

"Spook thriller that mingles laughs and thrills in rapid succession and includes a quantity of hair-raising stunts... Johnny Arthur's part seems more important than Chaney's" ---Film Daily

"Brrrr, this one will give you delicious creeps... A real thriller!" ---Photoplay

Film historian Jon Mirsalis opined "THE MONSTER will prove somewhat of a disappointment to die-hard Chaney fans, but a delight to connoisseurs of Director Roland West's stylistic Gothic dramas. Like some of his other works, especially THE BAT and THE BAT WHISPERS, THE MONSTER is a lavish production marked by Gothic sets, lush art design, and is punctuated by both the grotesque and quite a bit of comic relief supplied by Arthur."
