= California or Bust =

1927 film directed by Phil Rosen

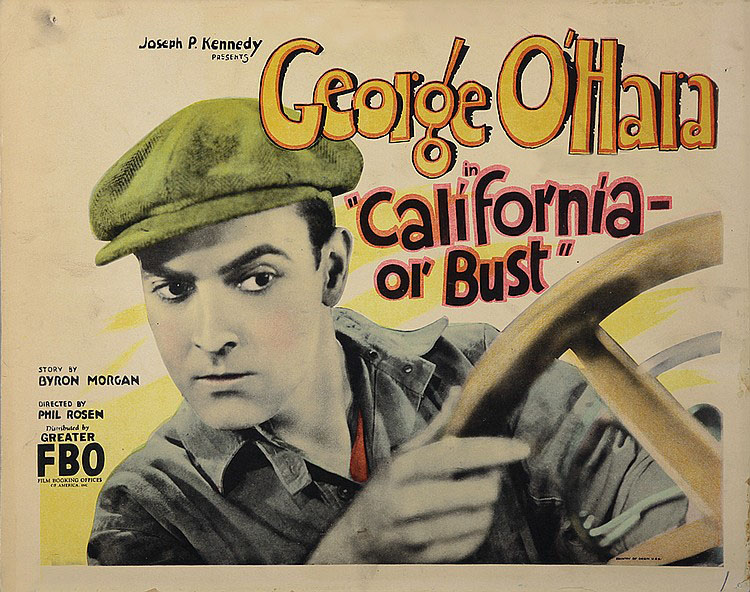
- Lobby poster for the film
- Directed by: Phil Rosen
- Screenplay by: Byron Morgan; Al Boasberg
- Story by: Byron Morgan
- Produced by: Joseph P. Kennedy
- Starring: George O'Hara; Helen Foster; John Steppling
- Cinematography: H. Lyman Broening
- Production company: R-C Pictures
- Distributed by: Film Booking Offices of America
- Release date: January 9, 1927 (US)
- Running time: 5 reels
- Country: United States
- Language: Silent (English intertitles)

California or Bust is a 1927 American silent comedy-drama film, directed by Phil Rosen. It stars George O'Hara, Helen Foster, and John Steppling, and was released on January 9, 1927.

== Plot ==
Jeff Daggett is a mechanic in the fictional town of Rockett, Arizona. He owns a local garage, but he leaves the day-to-day operation of the garage to his assistant, the mechanic. Daggett spends all his time on developing a new car motor.

While they are driving west to California, the president of a motor company, Holtwood, and his daughter Nadine are passing through Rockett when their car breaks down. When Daggett comes to service them, he begins talking about his new motor. When they get back to the garage, Holtwood contacts his chief engineer, Wade Rexton, to come out from California to take a look at the motor.

When he arrives, Rexton realizes the potential of the engine, but as he watches the interaction between Daggett and Nadine, he sees Daggett as a competitor for Nadine's affections and becomes jealous. Instead of praising Daggett's motor, he denigrates it, and challenges Daggett to a race, with Rexton in a car with a Holtwood motor, and Daggett in a car using his own design. After the race starts, Rexton is waylayed on the highway by a robber. As Daggett reaches Rexton, they take off after the robber, and eventually catch him, retrieving the car. After they return to Rockett, Holtwood offers Daggett a job, which he accepts.

== Cast list ==
- George O'Hara as Jeff Daggett
- Helen Foster as Nadine Holtwood
- John Steppling as President Holtwood
- Johnny Fox as Mechanic
- Irving Bacon as Wade Rexton

== Production ==
In November 1926, Byron Morgan finished the screenplay for California or Bust, which was to be a vehicle for George O'Hara. Initially, it was reported that the film was to be directed by Alf Goulding. By late November the film was in production with Phil Rosen at the helm. In addition to O'Hara, Helen Foster, John Steppling, John Fox Jr., and Irving Bacon were announced to be in the cast. At the beginning of January it was revealed that Al Boasberg had been brought in to work on the titles. Portions of the film were shot on location in Southern California. Filming on the project was completed by the middle of December.

== Censorship ==
Before California or Bust could be exhibited in Kansas, the Kansas Board of Review required the removal of the scenes where a boy thumbs his nose and of the actual hold-up, and the robbery scene was shortened significantly.
