= Phyllis Duganne =

American author

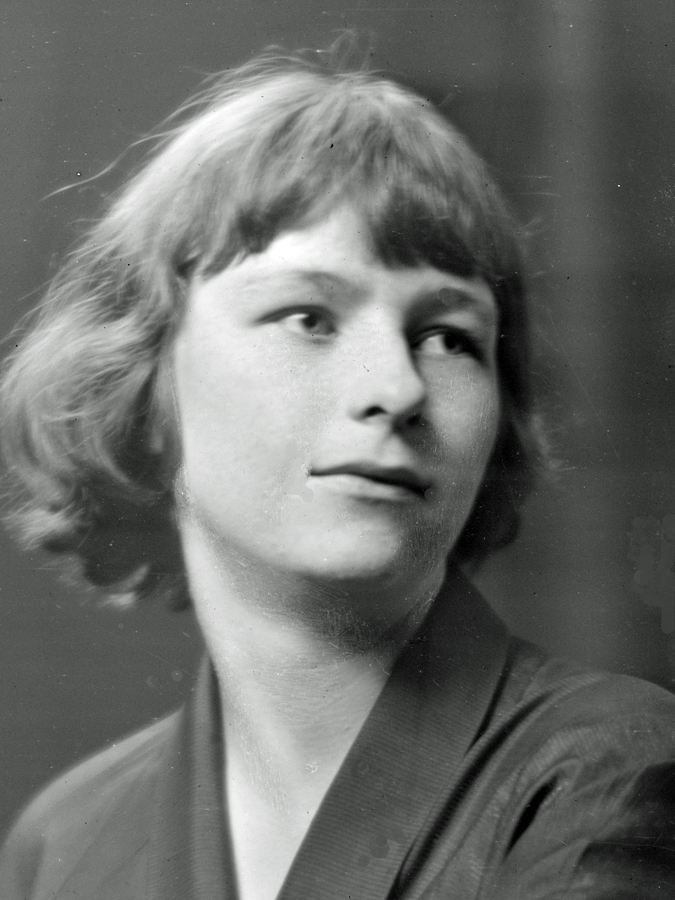
- Phyllis Duganne (1918). Portrait by Arnold Genthe.
- Born: November 24, 1899; Boston, Massachusetts
- Died: November 8, 1976 (aged 76); Massachusetts, United States
- Occupation: Writer

Phyllis Duganne (November 24, 1899 – November 8, 1976), also known as Phyllis Duganne Given, was an American writer of short stories, novels, and drama. Beginning her professional writing career as a teenager, she published fiction in magazines including The Saturday Evening Post, Collier's, Ladies' Home Journal, Harper's Bazaar, and McCall's. Her books included the novels Prologue (1920) and Ruthie (1921). Her 1930 play Nice Girl was adapted as the 1941 film Nice Girl?, and other stories by Duganne were also adapted for film.

== Early life and education ==
Duganne was born Carol Atherton Dugan on November 24, 1899, in Boston, Massachusetts, to Stephen and Maud (Haynes) Dugan. Her father was a missionary.

Duganne attended the Girls' Latin School in Boston, but she did not attend college. She spent summers with her uncle and aunt, Will Irwin and Inez Haynes Irwin. In her book Janey, Inez Haynes Irwin based the character of Janey on Duganne as a child.

In 1908, at age eight, Duganne had a poem published in a Boston newspaper. At 12, she won a short story contest in the same paper. She was 17 when her short story "Crabbed Youth" was published in the The Saturday Evening Post.

== Career ==
In 1919, Duganne joined the feminist magazine Judy as an editor; however, the magazine stopped publication after four issues. Duganne's first novel, Prologue, was published in 1920. The plot of Prologue focused on 16-year-old Rita and her coming of age. A contemporary review in the San Francisco Chronicle found Rita improbably precocious. Duganne's second book, the children's novel Ruthie, appeared in 1921. Its protagonist, after spending 13 years in China, adjusts to life in an American suburb.

From the 1920s through the 1940s, Duganne published short stories in periodicals including Collier's, Ladies’ Home Journal, The Saturday Evening Post, Harper’s Bazaar, and McCall’s. She also served in the 1920s and 1930s as an associate editor on the National Woman's Party journal, Equal Rights.

In 1928, the film Sweet Sixteen was based on one of her stories. In 1930, Duganne wrote the play Nice Girl. It was made into the film Nice Girl? in 1941. The film The Way Home (1957) was also based on one of Duganne's short stories.

== Personal life ==
Duganne married Austin Parker on January 27, 1919; they had one daughter. The couple divorced on June 22, 1928. In February 1934, Duganne married Frederick Eben Given; they had one son. Duganne died on November 8, 1976 in Massachusetts.

== Selected works ==
=== Books ===
- Prologue (1920)
- Ruthie (1921)

=== Play ===
- Nice Girl (1930)

=== Short stories ===
- Crabbed Youth (1918)
- White Man'll Get You (1918)
- Love Asks Too Much (1930)
- Bedtime Story (1936)

== Film adaptations ==
- Sweet Sixteen (1928)
- Nice Girl? (1941)
- The Way Home (1957)
