= Doubting Thomas (1935 film) =

1935 film by David Butler

- Theatrical release poster
- Directed by: David Butler
- Screenplay by: William Conselman; Bartlett Cormack
- Based on: The Torch Bearers by George Kelly
- Produced by: Buddy G. DeSylva
- Starring: Will Rogers; Billie Burke; Alison Skipworth; Sterling Holloway; Andrew Tombes; Gail Patrick
- Cinematography: Joseph A. Valentine
- Edited by: Irene Morra
- Music by: Arthur Lange
- Production company: Fox Film Corporation
- Distributed by: 20th Century-Fox Film Corporation
- Release date: June 7, 1935
- Running time: 73 minutes
- Country: United States
- Language: English

Doubting Thomas is a 1935 American comedy film directed by David Butler and written by William Conselman and Bartlett Cormack. It is based on the 1922 play The Torch Bearers by George Kelly. The film stars Will Rogers, Billie Burke, Alison Skipworth, Sterling Holloway, Andrew Tombes, and Gail Patrick. It was released on June 7, 1935, by 20th Century-Fox Film Corporation.

== Plot ==
A husband mocks his wife's theatrical aspirations when she agrees to appear in a local production. When she starts to neglect him, he decides to retaliate by taking the stage himself.

== Cast ==
- Will Rogers as Thomas Brown
- Billie Burke as Paula Brown
- Alison Skipworth as Mrs. Pampinelli
- Sterling Holloway as Mr. Spindler
- Andrew Tombes as Huxley Hossefrosse
- Gail Patrick as Florence McCrickett
- Frances Grant as Peggy Burns
- Frank Albertson as Jimmy Brown
- Johnny Arthur as Ralph Twiller
- Helen Flint as Nelly Fell
- Fred Wallace as Teddy
- T. Roy Barnes as LaMaze
- Ruth Warren as Jenny
- John Qualen as Von Blitzen
- George Cooper as Stagehand
- Helen Freeman as Mrs. Sheppard
- William "Billy" Benedict as Caddie
- Dennis O'Keefe as Audience Member (uncredited)
