= The Everlasting Whisper =

1925 film

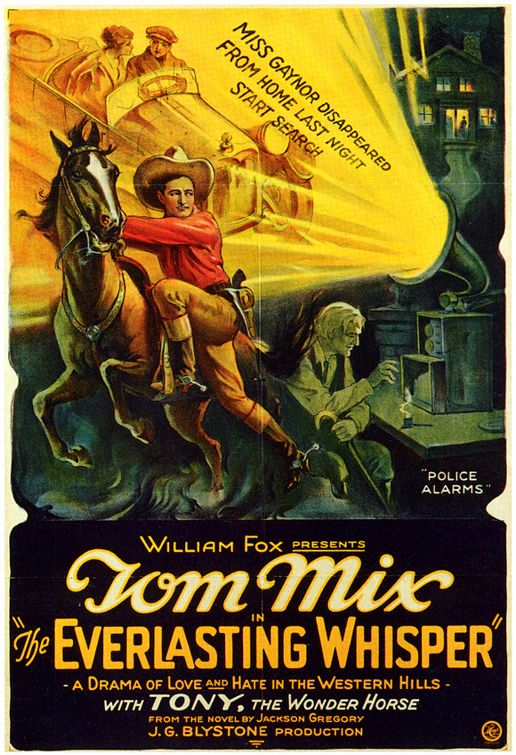
- Theatrical release poster
- Directed by: John G. Blystone
- Screenplay by: Wyndham Gittens
- Based on: The Everlasting Whisper, a Tale of the California Wilderness by Jackson Gregory
- Starring: Tom Mix; Alice Calhoun; Robert Cain; George Berrell; Walter James; Virginia Madison
- Cinematography: Daniel B. Clark
- Production company: Fox Film Corporation
- Distributed by: Fox Film Corporation
- Release date: October 11, 1925
- Running time: 60 minutes
- Country: United States
- Language: Silent (English intertitles)

The Everlasting Whisper is a lost 1925 American silent Western film directed by John G. Blystone and written by Wyndham Gittens. It is based on the 1922 novel The Everlasting Whisper, a Tale of the California Wilderness by Jackson Gregory. The film stars Tom Mix, Alice Calhoun, Robert Cain, George Berrell, Walter James and Virginia Madison. The film was released on October 11, 1925, by Fox Film Corporation.

== Cast ==
- Tom Mix as Mark King
- Alice Calhoun as Gloria Gaynor
- Robert Cain as Gratton
- George Berrell as Old Honeycutt
- Walter James as Aswin Brody
- Virginia Madison as Mrs. Gaynor
- Karl Dane as Jarrold
- Tony the Horse as Mark's Horse
