= The Road to Ruin (1928 film) =

1928 film

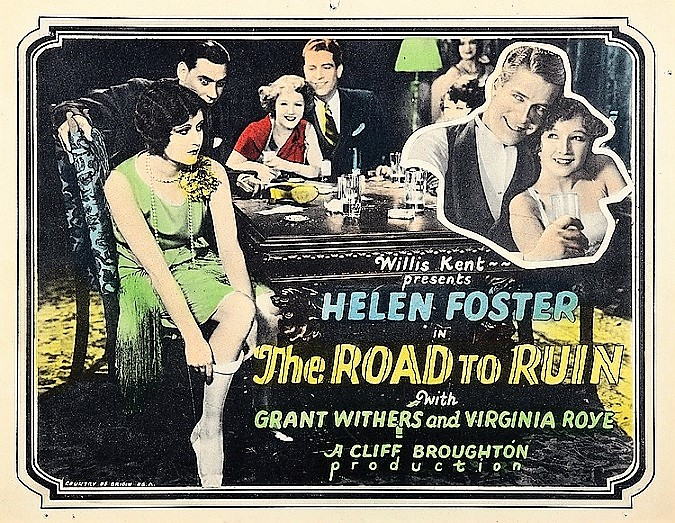
- Lantern slide
- Directed by: Norton S. Parker
- Written by: Willis Kent
- Produced by: Willis Kent
- Starring: Helen Foster
- Cinematography: Henry Cronjager
- Edited by: Edith Wakeling
- Distributed by: True-Life Photoplays
- Release date: March 23, 1928
- Running time: 60 minutes
- Country: United States
- Language: Silent (English intertitles)
- Box office: $2,500,000

The Road to Ruin (1934) remake directed by Dorothy Davenport and Melville Shyer

The Road to Ruin is a 1928 American silent black-and-white exploitation film directed by Norton S. Parker and starring Helen Foster. Due to its popularity, a sound version of the film was released late in 1928. While the sound version of the film has no audible dialog, it featured a synchronized musical score with sound effects using both the sound-on-disc and sound-on-film process. The film is about a teenage girl, Sally Canfield, whose life is led astray by sex, smoking, and drinking, and ruined by an abortion. The film was remade as a talkie in 1934.

== Cast ==
- Helen Foster as Sally Canfield
- Grant Withers as Don Hughes
- Florence Turner as Mrs. Canfield
- Charles Miller as Mr. Canfield
- Virginia Roye as Eve Terrell
- Thomas Carr as Jimmy Canfield
- Don Rader as Al
- Eddie Dunn as Strip Poker Player
- Joe Darensbourg as Musician in Barn Dance Scene (uncredited)
- Kallie Foutz as Extra (uncredited)
- Walter James as Headwaiter (uncredited)

== Music ==
The sound version featured a theme song entitled "The Road to Ruin" by Lottie Wells and Maurice Wells.

== Production ==
The Road to Ruin was made on a budget of either $15,000 or $25,000, making it one of the least expensive films made that year. Director Norton S. Parker later told his wife that lead actress Helen Foster was much like her character in that she was relatively naive; during the filming of the strip poker scenes, Parker kept a bottle of hard alcohol to offer Foster "liquid courage". The film was shot by Henry Cronjager using a hand-cranked camera typical of the era, but at faster-than-normal crank speed; this helped fill up each reel and getting the final film to feature length, but had the effect of making all the action in the film move slower.
