= Always Tomorrow: The Portrait of an American Business =

- Starring: John Archer
- Music by: Samuel Benavie
- Release date: 1941
- Country: United States
- Language: English

Always Tomorrow: The Portrait of an American Business is a 1941 American promotional film dramatizing the history of the Coca-Cola company.

== Plot ==
The film opens with Jim Westlake (John Archer) reflecting on the newspaper headlines about World War II, emphasizing a sense of uncertainty about the future. He says, "Men's souls wrestle with the thought of tomorrow, and today is the eve of tomorrow." His employee Larry Larabee (Johnny Arthur) is worried about the future of their company, but Westlake attempts to placate him by reminding him that the company has survived World War I and the lean years of the Great Depression.

Westlake narrates how he became a Coca-Cola bottler and has recently opened a new bottling plant in his town. The scene shifts back several years to the planning stages of the new factory, and Larabee worries about the risk of building a new plant during the Depression. "Right now isn't the time to go sinking a lot of money—" he begins, before a co-worker interrupts him: "Right now isn't what we're building for. It's the future." "You talk just like Jim Westlake," Larabee responds, "All he thinks about is tomorrow. Always tomorrow."

More scenes from the history of the bottling business follow, illustrating Westlake's willingness to spend money and time on new initiatives to grow his business, and the efforts of the company's salesmen and dealers. Details such as a Depression-era bank holiday, a 20s-era dance party, and an early wireless (radio) help to place each scene in period context as the film proceeds through its reverse chronological narrative, moving backwards through time to show different moments in the company's history. Also illustrated is the development of manufacturing and bottling standards, in which chemists and modern quality-control methods are employed. A cooler to allow Coca-Cola to be sold ice-cold in the store is introduced. Sugar rationing during World War I threatens the company's future. The design of the well-known "Coke bottle" shape is said to have been inspired a woman's hobble skirt.

The final scene of the film shows the business's earliest operations. Westlake is denied a loan due to a period of financial uncertainty, presumably the Panic of 1907, but remains confident about his business's future. Larabee is shown operating a manual bottling machine, which is slow and difficult to use, contrasting with the automated production line shown early in the film. He complains about the quality of their second-hand equipment, but Westlake remains characteristically optimistic.

== Cast ==
- John Archer as Jim Westlake
- Johnny Arthur as Larry Larabee
- Bill Erwin as Sam Tompkins

== References in other media ==
In 2012, Red Bull Racing used a sample from the film's dialog in the promotional debut video for their RB8 Formula One race car. In the Red Bull video, the words "the eve of" are omitted from the line "Men's souls wrestle with the thought of tomorrow, and today is the eve of tomorrow."
