= The Road to Ruin (1934 film) =

1934 film

- DVD cover (detail)
- Directed by: Dorothy Davenport; Melville Shyer
- Written by: Dorothy Davenport; Willis Kent(uncredited)
- Produced by: Willis Kent
- Starring: Helen Foster; Nell O'Day; Glen Boles
- Cinematography: James Diamond
- Edited by: S. Roy Luby
- Distributed by: True-Life Photoplays; First Division Pictures
- Release dates: February 17, 1934 (New York City); May 15, 1934 (U.S.)
- Running time: 62 minutes
- Country: United States
- Language: English

The Road to Ruin is a 1934 pre-Code exploitation film directed by Dorothy Davenport, under the name "Mrs. Wallace Reid", and Melville Shyer, and written by Davenport with the uncredited contribution of the film's producer, Willis Kent. The film, now in the public domain, portrays a young woman whose life is ruined by sex and drugs.

== Plot ==
Ann Dixon and Eve Monroe are high school friends. Eve is more "experienced" and shows Ann some things that are new to Ann, like smoking and drinking alcohol. Eve laughs when Ann asks her, "Do you let boys kiss you?" One weekend, Ann and Eve go to the lake with fellow high schoolers, Tommy and Ed. After what must have been Ann's first sexual experience, she cries pitifully and Tommy asks her whether she hates him. But, Ann continues to see Tommy and they go to restaurants where they drink alcohol and kiss passionately.

One night while out drinking, Ralph notices Ann and likes what he sees. Noticing that her date, Tommy, has had too much to drink, he moves in on Ann. Since Tommy is out of it, Ann joins Ralph for a drink. When Tommy tries to fight Ralph, he and Ed are kicked out of the place. Ann drops Tommy, and he warns her that Ralph is "bad news for a girl like you." One night, at Ralph's home he gives Ann a "special brew" and they end up (apparently) having intercourse, since Ann has no resistance.

Ann continues to see Ralph and lies to her parents about where she has been. Ann and Ralph attend a party at Brad's where most of the guests are drinking to excess. The party guests begin a game akin to strip poker, played with dice. Only the girls seem to lose their clothing, and eventually lots of the guests noisily end up in the swimming pool, lacking much of their clothes. Disgruntled neighbors are outraged and call the police. Ralph sees the cops arrive, and leaves, abandoning Ann to be arrested with Eve. Ann and Eve end up with Mrs. Merrill, the head of the Girls Division of the Juvenile Department of the police. The girls are required to be "examined" by a doctor before they can be released. The examination reveals Eve has been labelled as a "Sex Delinquent" and has been tested positive for the Wassermann test (one of the earliest test for syphilis). Mrs. Merrill tells Mrs. Dixon that today's youth needs the armor of knowledge and sex instruction.

Then, we find out through innuendo that Ann is going to have a baby. She tells Ralph and finds out that he is married. He also (apparently) suggests she get an abortion. The abortion, "a clumsy, unsanitary operation" leaves Ann gravely ill. On Ann's deathbed, her mother asks Ann for forgiveness for utterly failing her; Ann quietly slips away.

== Cast ==
- Helen Foster as Ann Dixon
- Nell O'Day as Eve Monroe
- Glen Boles as Tommy
- Robert Quirk as Ed
- Paul Page as Ralph Bennett
- Richard Hemingway as Brad
- Virginia True Boardman as Martha Dixon
- Richard Tucker as Mr. Dixon

Director/writer Dorothy Davenport appears in the film in the role of "Mrs. Merrill." Mae Busch and Fern Emmett appear in uncredited roles.

== Production ==
The Road to Ruin is a sound re-make of a 1928 silent film of the same name, written and produced by Willis Kent and also starring Helen Foster. Foster, reprising her role as a high school girl, was 27 years old at the time, and six years older than her on-screen boyfriend, Glen Boles.

The titles and composers of the three songs performed in the film are not recorded.

To promote the film, the producers advertised that it was not to be shown to anyone under eighteen, implying that it contained salacious material. Film censors in Virginia required a "record number" of cuts in the film before clearing it for release, according to Film Daily, while in Detroit, the film was boycotted by the Catholic Church, but was cleared by the local censors after some cuts.

A novelization of the film was put out by the producers, apparently intended for use by school and civic groups as an aid to discussion of the social problems presented in the film: teenage drinking, promiscuity, pregnancy and abortion.

== Reception ==
The reviewer for Variety found the film "restrained" in comparison to the more "hotly sexed" silent version, while other reviewers found it to be an improvement over the earlier film, and "sensational". Bret Wood, a more recent critic, called the film "[A] sordid drive down the path of moral and physical degradation, capped off with just enough of a moral lesson to alleviate any guilt the viewer might feel for watching such a decadent display."

== See also ==
- Pre-Code sex films

== Notes ==
=== Bibliography ===
- Felicia Feaster and Bret Wood. Forbidden Fruit: The Golden Age of Exploitation Film. (Midnight Marquee Press, 1999). ISBN 1-887664-24-6
