= Foxy (musical) =

- Original Playbill
- Music: Robert Emmett Dolan
- Lyrics: Johnny Mercer
- Book: Ian McLellan Hunter; Ring Lardner Jr.
- Basis: Ben Jonson's play Volpone
- Productions: 1964 Broadway

Foxy is a musical with a book by Ian McLellan Hunter and Ring Lardner Jr., lyrics by Johnny Mercer, and music by Robert Emmett Dolan.

Based on Ben Jonson's Volpone, it transports the original play's setting of early-17th century Renaissance Venice to the Yukon during the gold rush of 1898. When prospector Jim Fox confides in buddies Bedrock, Shortcut, and Buzzard that he's discovered a mother lode in the Klondike River, they set off to claim it as their own. Foxy and con man Doc Mosk join forces to swindle the greedy trio out of their stolen wealth. The two arrive in the Yukon with an enormous chest they claim is filled with gold and announce that Foxy is dying and looking to name an heir. As expected, the three begin to cater to their pal's every whim in the hope they'll be selected.

Subplots focus on Doc's affair with local madam Brandy; destitute Celia, who decides to sell herself to the highest bidder; and Bedrock's son Ben, who returns from Dartmouth College in time to save Celia and become involved in Foxy's shenanigans.

== Background ==
Foxy was conceived by the Canada-born producer Robert Whitehead for a 70th-anniversary commemoration of the Yukon Gold Rush, and tailored to the comic talents of Bert Lahr. Co-produced by the Government of Canada, "Foxy" opened about as far from Broadway as possible - in a rehabilitated opera house, the Palace Grand, in the Yukon Territory town of Dawson City. The government's dream of promoting tourism in this remote area proved to be a folly, and the show played - for seven weeks - to mostly empty houses, losing its entire $400,000 investment.

The New York Times reported the show's losses as $340,000.

Lahr returned to New York City and signed for S. J. Perelman's The Beauty Part. The following season, however, producer David Merrick decided to mount a production on Broadway. The book was revamped, and seven new songs were added to the score.

== Productions ==
The Broadway production, directed by Robert Lewis and choreographed by Jack Cole, opened on February 16, 1964 at the Ziegfeld Theatre, where it ran for 72 performances. In addition to Lahr, the cast included Larry Blyden as Doc, Robert H. Harris as Bedrock, Gerald Hiken as Shortcut, Edward Greenhalgh as Buzzard, Cathryn Damon as Brandy, Julienne Marie as Celia, and John Davidson as Ben.

Foxy's failure was due less to critical reaction, which for the most part was favorable, and more to Merrick's lack of interest in the project. His Hello, Dolly! had opened the month before, and he was too involved with its immediate success to devote any time or money to promoting the less promising effort. Additionally, the Ziegfeld was off the beaten Broadway track, losing walk-in business to venues more centrally located in the theatre district.

RCA Victor, which had acquired the rights to the cast album, opted not to release an original cast recording.

== Song list ==
Act I

- "Prologue"
- "Many Ways to Skin a Cat"
- "Rollin' in Gold"
- "My Weight in Gold"
- "Money Isn't Everything"
- "Larceny and Love"
- "Ebenezer McAfee III"
- "Talk to Me, Baby"
- "This is My Night to Howl"
- "Bon Vivant"

Act II

- "It's Easy When You Know How"
- "Run, Run, Run Cinderella"
- "Talk to Me, Baby" (Reprise)
- "I'm Way Ahead of the Game"
- "A Case of Rape"
- "In Loving Memory"

== Awards and nominations ==
=== Original Broadway production ===
Year	Award	Category	Nominee	Result
1964	Tony Award	Best Actor in a Musical	Bert Lahr	Won
1964	Tony Award	Best Featured Actress in a Musical	Julienne Marie	Nominated
