= Jeanette Hackett =

American dancer and choreographer

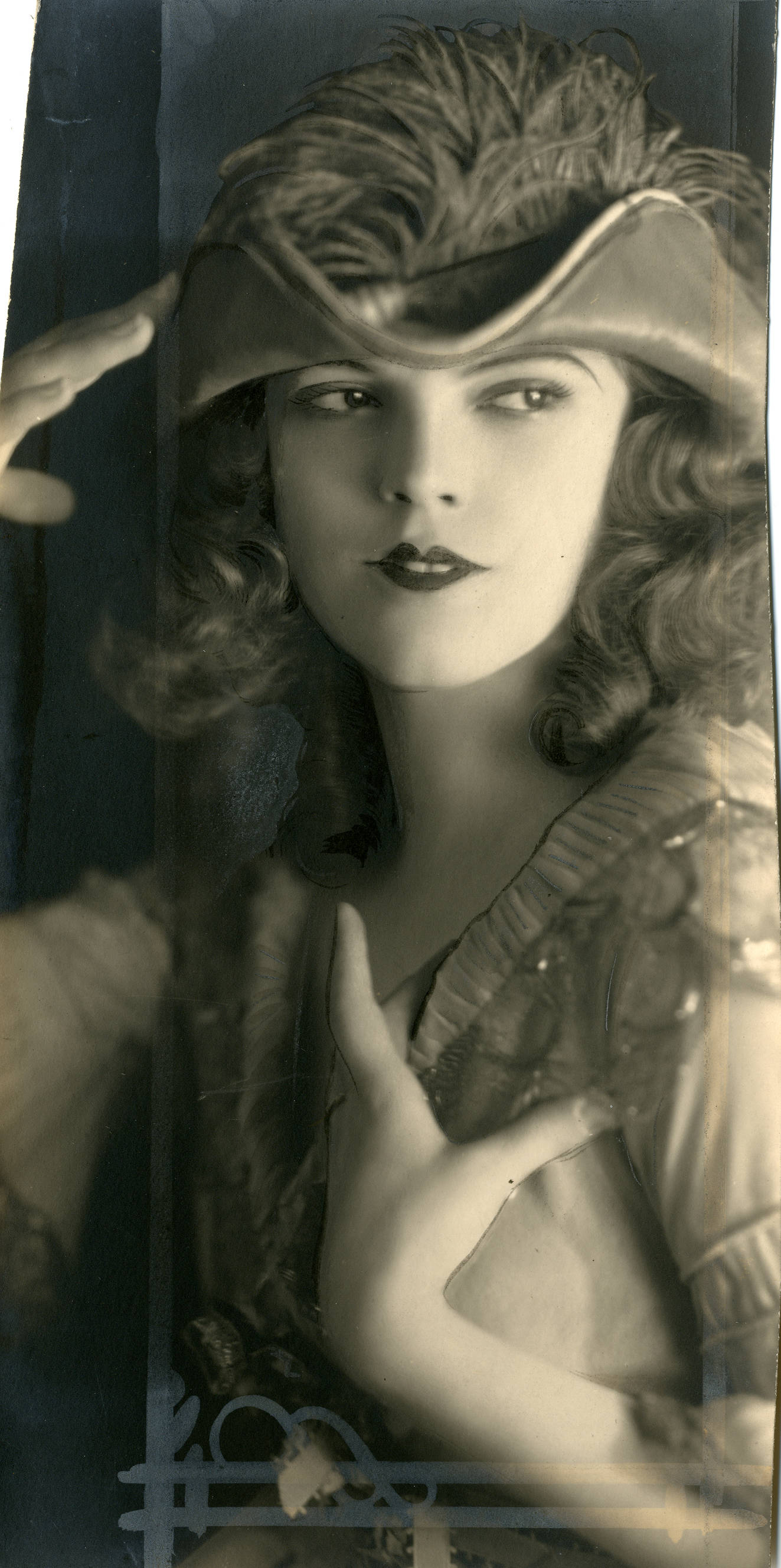
- Born: March 7, 1898; New York City, U.S.
- Died: August 15, 1979 (aged 81); New York City
- Occupations: Dancer, choreographer

Jeanette Hackett, sometimes given as Janette Hackett, (March 7, 1898 – August 15, 1979) was an American dancer and choreographer popular in vaudeville in the 1920s and 1930s. For the first part of her career, she partnered Harry Delmar.

== Life and career ==
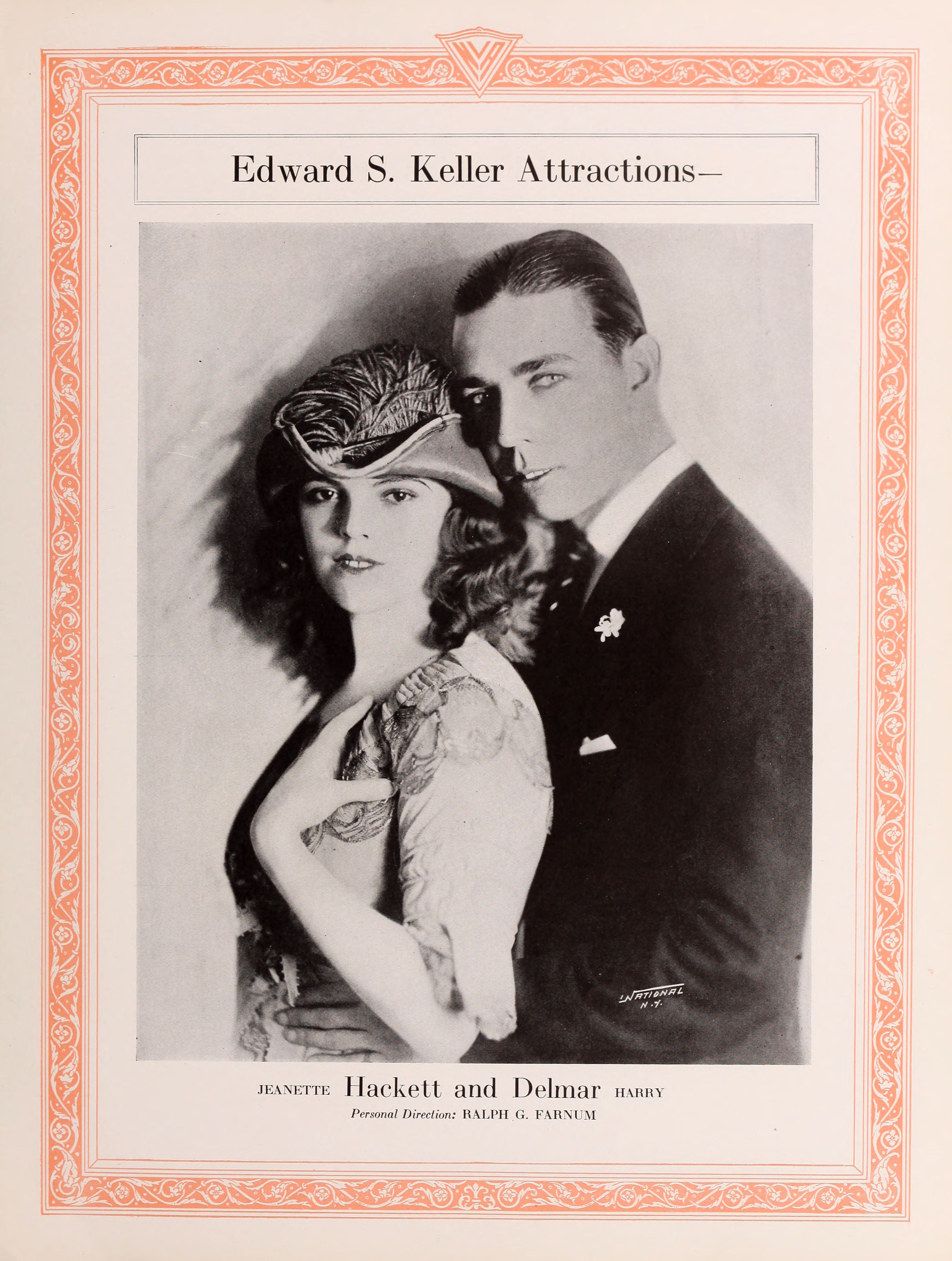
Hackett with her dance partner, Harry Delmar.

She was born in New York City, the daughter of Maurice and Florence Hackett, an actress in silent films. Sources give various alternate spellings of her name, including Jeanette, Jenette and Jeannette. She was trained as a dancer by Kitty Doner, and performed in the chorus of The Passing Show, and as a nightclub dancer, before replacing Billie Shaw in the vaudeville act of Seabury and Shaw in the late 1910s. When Seabury also retired, Hackett joined forces with Missouri-born Harry Delmar. As Hackett and Delmar, the couple made their debut as dancers at the 125th Street Theatre in 1919, and married soon afterwards.

Although initially not highly regarded as performers, they continued together in vaudeville and became increasingly popular through the 1920s. They regularly produced new dance revues, featuring revealing costumes, chorus girls, choreography by Hackett, and acrobatics by Delmar. They produced a Broadway revue, Harry Delmar's Revels, in 1927. However, Hackett and Delmar divorced in the late 1920s, and their performing partnership ended.

In 1930, Hackett married singer John Steel. She began performing as a solo dancer, scantily clad, in dramatic performances supported by three male dancers. At the climax of their performances, Hackett would remove her main partner's mask and reveal him to be the personification of death; she would then fall down a flight of stairs, pulling down the curtain behind her to end the performance. She continued to perform through the 1930s; one of her dance partners was Cesar Romero. She established a dance group, the "Janette Hackett Dancers" or "Janette Hackett Girls", who appeared in several short "soundies" in the 1940s, directed by William Forest Crouch.

Hackett died in New York City in 1979 at the age of 81.
