= First Love (1970 film) =

- Film poster
- Directed by: Maximilian Schell
- Written by: Screenplay: Maximilian Schell; Novella: Ivan Turgenev
- Produced by: Barry Levinson; Maximilian Schell
- Starring: Maximilian Schell; Dominique Sanda; John Moulder-Brown
- Cinematography: Sven Nykvist
- Edited by: Dagmar Hirtz
- Music by: Mark London
- Release date: 10 July 1970 (San Sebastian Film Festival)
- Countries: Switzerland; West Germany; Hungary
- Languages: English; German

First Love (German: Erste Liebe) is a 1970 film, written, directed, produced and starred in by Austrian director Maximilian Schell. It is an adaptation of Ivan Turgenev's 1860 novella of the same name, starring Schell, Dominique Sanda, and John Moulder-Brown.

First Love was nominated for the Best Foreign Language Film at the 43rd Academy Awards as a Swiss entry.

== Plot ==
In 19th-century Russia, Princess Zasekina and her daughter Zinaida move in next door to Alexander, a 16-year-old boy. Alexander falls deeply in love with Zinaida, who attracts the attention of several men, including Count Malevsky, Doctor Luzhin, and the poet Maidanov. Despite Zinaida's initial aloofness, she appears to reciprocate Alexander's affection inconsistently, sometimes pushing him away and other times showing him affection.

Alexander's mother disapproves of his infatuation with the daughter of a financially troubled family, but his father seems indifferent or even supportive. Alexander becomes increasingly obsessed with Zinaida, going so far as to spy on her at night. He discovers his father's secret affair with Zinaida, which deeply wounds him.

Zinaida manipulates Alexander's emotions, playing with his affections and treating him alternately as a child and a lover. Despite his mother's suspicions and eventual discovery of his father's involvement with Zinaida, Alexander remains fixated on her.

Years later, Alexander discovers that Zinaida married Doctor Luzhin after becoming pregnant from an affair. Despite his father's warning about women, Alexander's infatuation with Zinaida persists. However, his hopes for a future with her are shattered when he learns that she died in childbirth.

== Cast ==
- John Moulder-Brown as Alexander
- Dominique Sanda as Sinaida
- Maximilian Schell as Father
- Valentina Cortese as Mother
- Marius Goring as Dr. Lushin
- Dandy Nichols as Princess Zasekina
- Richard Warwick as Lt. Belovzorov
- Keith Bell as Count Malevsky
- Johannes Schaaf as Nirmatsky
- John Osborne as Maidanov

== Reception ==
=== Critical response ===
Roger Greenspun of The New York Times wrote of the film that "despite its pretentiousness, its prettiness, its 1,000 excesses—and to a degree perhaps because of them—it succeeds as vision even while it looks as if it were being suffocated by style." Roger Ebert of the Chicago Sun-Times gave the film two stars out of four and wrote, "The problem in 'First Love' (apart from the fact that the conclusion in no way emerges organically from the material) is that the whole movie is so smug in its sense of tragedy. In his directing debut, Maximilian Schell has taken a Turgenev story and stretched it out with silence, vast characterless landscapes, plenty of birds, some solitude and a visual style that doesn't help much." Gene Siskel of the Chicago Tribune gave the film an identical two-star grade and declared, "Schell neglects to pare Turgenev's story to the essential element of a young boy's love for a visiting neighbor, and attempts to include some of the Russian author's social comment on the superficiality of the ruling class. The result is a screenplay with vaulting ambition that is neither sensual nor witty." Variety called it "a sincere, affectionate and exquisitely pretty picture of youthful love—or infatuation—against the leisurely but already threatened backdrop of a world and society that was, but that symbolically also mirrors the present day." Charles Champlin of the Los Angeles Times stated, "At moments 'First Love' is overly elliptical and confusing, though the main advance of the narrative never falters. What is especially noteworthy is the film's power of suggestion and restraint in conveying an atmosphere highly charged with decadent sex." Gary Arnold of The Washington Post wrote, "Cinematographer Sven Nykvist puts on a swell show, performing one stunning feat of luminosity after another, but director Maximilian Schell is compulsively unilluminating about matters of theme and character and historical period and continuity."

=== Awards and nominations ===
- Academy Awards, USA

1971 Nominated for Best Foreign Language Film (Switzerland)

- German Film Awards

1971 Won the "Film Award in Gold" for "Outstanding Feature Film"

- San Sebastián International Film Festival

1970 Maximilian Schell Won the "Silver Seashell" award

== See also ==
- List of submissions to the 43rd Academy Awards for Best Foreign Language Film
- List of Swiss submissions for the Academy Award for Best Foreign Language Film
