= Martin Gottfried =

American critic, columnist and author

- Born: October 9, 1933; Brooklyn, New York
- Died: March 6, 2014 (aged 80); Manhattan, New York
- Education: Columbia University (BA)
- Occupations: Drama critic; columnist; author
- Years active: 1968–2014
- Employer: New York Law Journal
- Spouse: Jane Lahr (div.)
- Children: 1
- Relatives: Bert Lahr (former-father-in-law)

Martin Gottfried (October 9, 1933 – March 6, 2014) was an American critic, columnist and author. He was born in Brooklyn, New York.

== Biography ==
=== Early career ===
Gottfried was a 1959 graduate of Columbia College in New York City, and attended Columbia Law School for three semesters, next spending one year with U.S. Army Military Intelligence. Gottfried began his writing career as the classical music critic for The Village Voice, doubling as an off-Broadway reviewer for Women's Wear Daily, a position that made him the youngest member of the New York Drama Critics Circle in the organization's history.

In 1968, Little, Brown and Company published his first book, A Theater Divided, a study of post-World War II American theater. The book won the highest honor in dramatic criticism, the George Jean Nathan Award. In 1970 Putnam published Opening Nights, a collection of his essays. By then, he had become a regular contributor to the Arts and Leisure section of The New York Times' Sunday edition.

=== Drama critic and educator ===
In 1974, he became the drama critic for the New York Post. Four years later, he "Americanized" the West End musical Bar Mitzvah Boy for an off-Broadway production.

In 1979, Gottfried began writing for the Saturday Review, the same year Harry N. Abrams, Inc. published his Broadway Musicals. In 1991, it was joined by a sequel, More Broadway Musicals. and "In Person," a tribute to performing artists.

As drama critic for the New York Law Journal, Gottfried conducted a series of "Conversations" at the 92nd Street Y as well as at the New School of Social Research and the Metropolitan Museum of Art. Participants included Stephen Sondheim, Andrew Lloyd Webber, Harold Prince, Jane Alexander, Christopher Walken and Richard Dreyfuss. Gottfried also was a contributor to The New York Times Sunday Magazine, Vogue, the Yale Drama Review and Condé Nast Traveler. He also wrote regular articles on the performing arts for Stagebill, the program distributed in theaters and concert halls across America.

He was a guest professor of theater at the Columbia University School of the Arts, Carnegie-Mellon University, Rutgers University and the Colorado College, as well as a Visiting Artist/Professor at the College of Santa Fe.

He died of complications of pneumonia at the age of 80 on March 6, 2014, in Manhattan. He was married to Jane Lahr, daughter of Bert Lahr and sister of John Lahr.

=== Author ===
Gottfried's writings include biographies of Sondheim, Arthur Miller, Jed Harris, Bob Fosse, Danny Kaye, George Burns, and Angela Lansbury. His latest book, co-written with Bill Condon and Cheo Coker, is Dreamgirls The Movie Musical, published in April 2007.

A review of Arthur Miller: His Life and Work called the book a "thorough and revealing biography".
