= Tennessee Williams: Mad Pilgrimage of the Flesh =

2014 book by John Lahr

- First edition (UK)
- Author: John Lahr
- Language: English
- Genre: Biography
- Publication date: 2014

Tennessee Williams: Mad Pilgrimage of the Flesh is a book by John Lahr first published in 2014. It is a biography of Tennessee Williams. It was published by Bloomsbury Publishing in the UK and by W. W. Norton Company in the US.

== Awards and honors ==
- 2014 National Book Critics Circle Award (Biography) winner.
