= Harry Delmar's Revels =

Broadway review in 1927

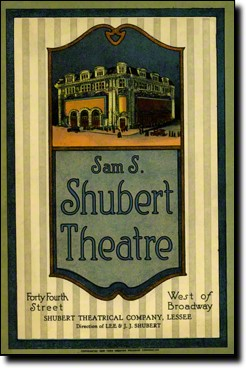
- Program for Harry Delmar's Revels (1927)
- Music: Jimmy Monaco, Jesse Greer, Lester Lee
- Lyrics: Billy Rose, Ballard MacDonald
- Book: William K. Wells

Harry Delmar's Revels was a Broadway revue that ran from Nov 28, 1927 - Mar 1928 for 112 performances. It was produced by Samuel Baerwitz and Harry Delmar. The music is by Jimmy Monaco, Jesse Greer, and Lester Lee. The book is by William K. Wells and the lyrics are by Billy Rose and Ballard MacDonald.

== Featured players ==
- Hugh Cameron
- Glen Dale
- Frank Fay
- William Gaston
- Patsy Kelly
- Bert Lahr and Mercedes Delpino
- Winnie Lightner
- Ivan Triesault

== Songs ==
- Four Walls
- Golden Memories of Perfume
- I Love a Man in a Uniform
- The Jigaboo Jig
- Laff 'Em Away
- Limbs of the Law
- My Rainbow
- Nagasaki
- Say It with a Solitaire

The well-known standard I Can't Give You Anything But Love by Jimmy McHugh and Dorothy Fields was cut before the opening. It was later used for Lew Leslie's Blackbirds of 1928.
