= Ivan Triesault =

Estonian-American actor (1898-1980)

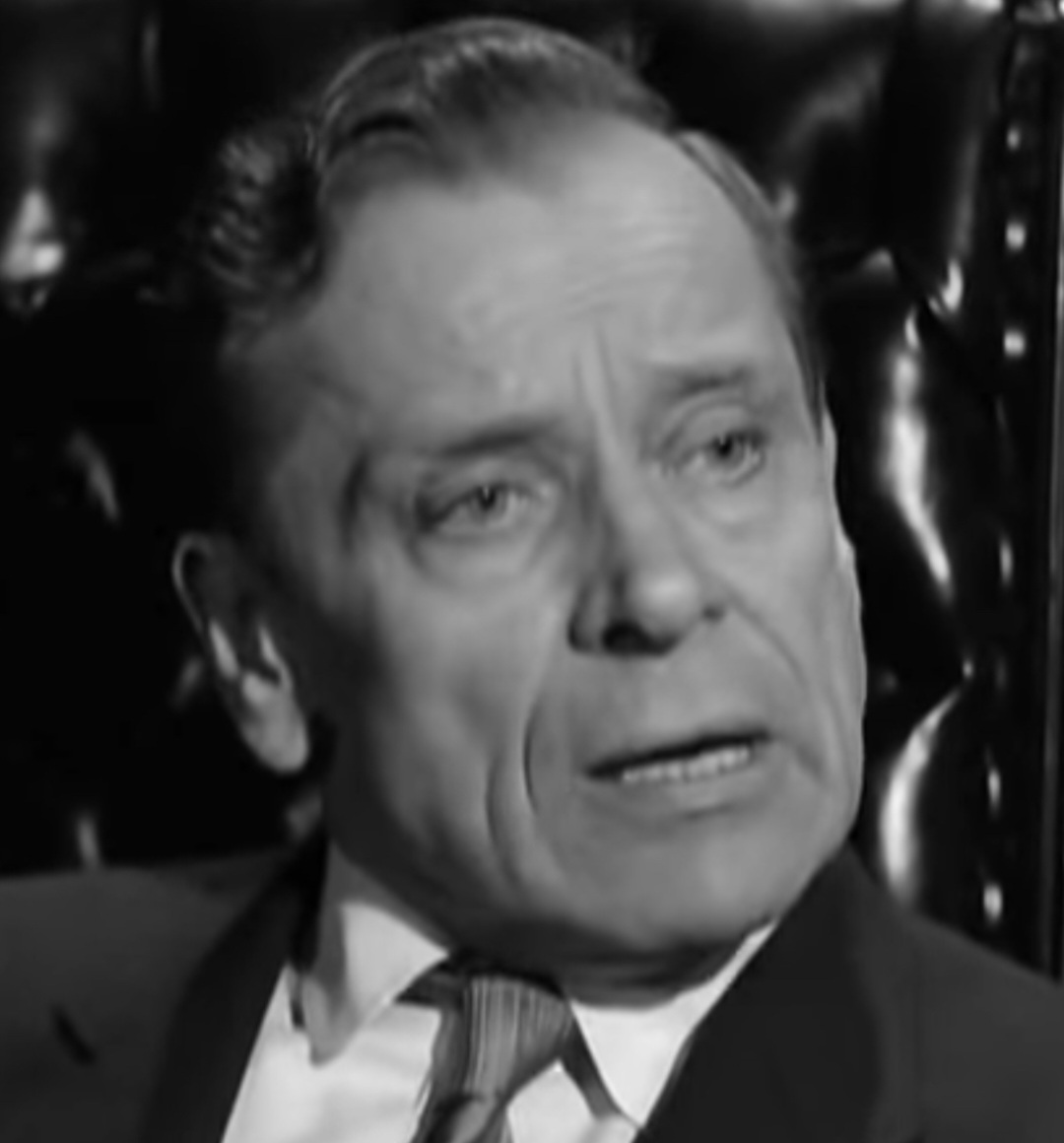
- Triesault in an episode of One Step Beyond (1959)
- Born: Johann Constantin Treisalt; 13 July 1898; Tallinn, Governorate of Estonia, Russian Empire (now in Harju County, Estonia)
- Died: 3 January 1980 (aged 81); Los Angeles, California, U.S.
- Other name: Juhan Treisalt
- Occupation: Actor
- Years active: 1942–1970

Ivan Triesault (born Johann Constantin Treisalt; 13 July [O.S. 1 July] 1898 – January 3, 1980) was an Estonian-American character actor and dancer, who appeared in some 130 film and television productions between 1943 and 1969.

== Early life ==
Triesault was born Johann Treisalt (rendered in Estonian as Juhan Treisalt) in Tallinn, the son of Baltic German parents from the island of Hiiumaa. His father was a foreman in a furniture factory and his mother worked as an au pair for a wealthy family. Triesault's father died when he was five years old.

He made his first stage appearance at the German Theatre in Tallinn aged 12, before moving to the United States aged 18. He trained as a ballet dancer under famed choreographer Mikhail Fokine, and worked as his assistant for several years. Working for Russian-born Fokine, he adopted 'Ivan' as his given name (Ivan [Иван] is the Russian form of 'Johann').

== Career ==
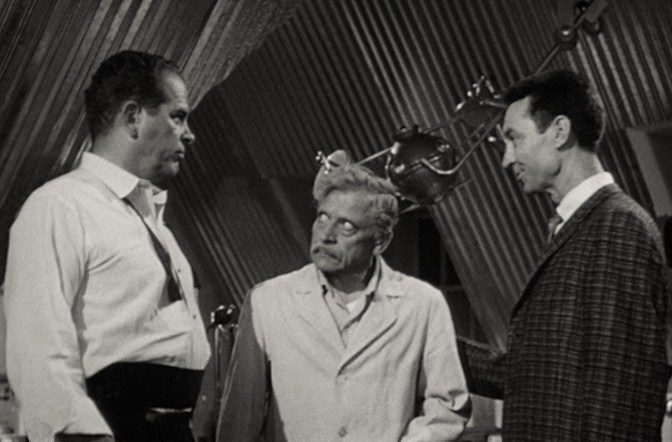
Douglas Kennedy, Ivan Triesault (center), and James Griffith in The Amazing Transparent Man (1960).

Triesault worked as a dancer and mime at Radio City Music Hall. During the 1920s, he worked with a touring theatre company in Europe, and furthered his acting studies in London. After returning to New York, he acted in various Broadway productions.

He made his debut in 1943's Mission to Moscow, a pro-Soviet propaganda film by Warner Bros., playing Mikhail Tukhachevsky. His notable roles include appearances in Cry of the Werewolf (1944), The Story of Dr. Wassell (1944), A Song to Remember (1945), Notorious (1946), 5 Fingers (1952), Jet Pilot (1957), Journey to the Center of the Earth (1959), The 300 Spartans (1962), It Happened in Athens (1962), Von Ryan's Express (1965), Batman (1966) and the TV series The Wild Wild West.

According to film historian Pekka Linnainen, Triesault is "the most successful Estonian actor in Hollywood history," who is "still completely unknown even in his home country." However, "fans of classic American cinema know his face".

== Death ==
Triesault died in Los Angeles in 1980, aged 81, from cardiac failure.

== Filmography ==
=== Film ===
Year	Title	Role(s)	Notes
1943	Mission to Moscow	Marshal Mikhail Tukhachevsky	Uncredited
1943	Hostages	Franta	
1943	The Strange Death of Adolf Hitler	Prince Hohenberg	
1944	Five Were Chosen		
1944	Song of Russia	Comissar	Uncredited
1944	In Our Time	Bujanski	Uncredited
1944	Uncertain Glory	Saboteur	Uncredited
1944	The Hitler Gang	Martin Niemöller	
1944	The Story of Dr. Wassell	Janssen Pharmacist's Mate	Uncredited
1944	The Black Parachute	Colonel Pavlec	
1944	Days of Glory	German Lieutenant	Uncredited
1944	The Mummy's Ghost	Scripps Museum Guide	Uncredited
1944	Cry of the Werewolf	Jan Spavero	
1944	Strange Affair	Dr. Igor Baumler	Uncredited
1945	A Song to Remember	Nicolas Chopin	Uncredited
1945	Escape in the Fog	Hausmer	
1945	Counter-Attack	Sgt. Johann Grillparzer	
1946	Notorious	Eric Mathi	
1946	Crime Doctor's Man Hunt	Alfred 'Alfredi' Hempstead	Uncredited
1946	The Return of Monte Cristo	Major Chavet	
1947	The Crimson Key	Peter Vandaman	
1947	Golden Earrings	Maj. Reimann	
1947	Escape Me Never	Choreographer	Uncredited
1948	The Woman from Tangier	Rocheau	
1948	To the Ends of the Earth	Naftalie Vrandstadter	Uncredited
1949	Outpost in Morocco	Tribal Leader	Uncredited
1949	Home in San Antone	Van Vliet, Jewel Thief	
1949	Johnny Allegro	Pelham Vetch	
1949	The Sickle or the Cross	I.V. Morse	
1949	Battleground	German Captain	Uncredited
1950	D.O.A.	Photographer	Uncredited
1950	Spy Hunt	Assassin	
1950	Kim	The Russian	
1951	Target Unknown	German Lieutenant	Uncredited
1951	My True Story	Alexis Delios	
1951	The Lady and the Bandit	King George	
1951	The Desert Fox: The Story of Rommel	German Major	Uncredited
1951	My Favorite Spy	Gunman	Uncredited
1952	5 Fingers	Steuben	Uncredited
1952	The Bad and the Beautiful	Von Ellstein	
1953	Desert Legion	Cpl. H. Schmidt	Uncredited
1953	Ma and Pa Kettle on Vacation	Henri Dupre	
1953	Scandal at Scourie	Father Barrett	Uncredited
1953	Young Bess	Danish Envoy	
1953	How to Marry a Millionaire	Phillip	Uncredited
1953	Back to God's Country	Reinhardt	
1954	Border River	Baron Von Hollden	
1954	Charge of the Lancers	Dr. Manus	
1954	The Student Prince	Prof. Klauber's Assistant	Uncredited
1954	The Gambler from Natchez	Raoul	Uncredited
1954	Her Twelve Men	Erik Haldeman	
1955	The Girl in the Red Velvet Swing	Ludwig	Uncredited
1957	Top Secret Affair	German Field Marshal	Uncredited
1957	The Buster Keaton Story	Duke Alexander Michael David	
1957	Silk Stockings	Russian Embassy Official	Uncredited
1957	Jet Pilot	Gen. Langrad	
1958	The Young Lions	German Colonel	Uncredited
1958	Fraulein	Prof. Julius Angermann	
1958	Me and the Colonel	Polish Vice Consul	Uncredited
1958	Mardi Gras	Bernard	Uncredited
1959	Journey to the Center of the Earth	Prof. Peter Göteborg	Uncredited
1960	I'll Give My Life	Dr. Neuman	
1960	The Amazing Transparent Man	Dr. Peter Ulof	
1960	Cimarron	Lewis Venable	Uncredited
1961	Go Naked in the World	Mons. Jacques Vrey	Uncredited
1961	Barabbas	Emperor	Uncredited
1962	It Happened in Athens	Grandpa Loues/Mr. Trisapopolis	
1962	The 300 Spartans	Demaratus	
1963	The Prize	Mr. Lindquist	Uncredited
1964	Viva Las Vegas	Head Captain	Uncredited
1965	Von Ryan's Express	SS-Obergruppenfuhrer Wilhelm von Kleist	
1965	Morituri	Lt. Brandt	
1966	Batman	West German Delegate	Uncredited
1969	The Search for the Evil One		
1970	The Lady, or the Tiger?	The King	

=== Television ===
Year	Title	Role(s)	Notes
1952	Dangerous Assignment	Dr. Anacos	Episode: "The Iron Banner Story"
1953	The Plymouth Playhouse	The President	Episode: "A Tale of Two Cities: Part 2"
1953	Ford Television Theatre	Lt. Schinkel	Episode: "The Jewel"
1953	G.E. True Theater	Walter	Episode: "The Eye of the Beholder"
1954	City Detective	Hans Orby	Episode: "The Blonde Orchid"
1954	The Adventures of Falcon	Ernest Meckler	Episode: "Borderline Case"
1954	Mystery Is My Business		Episode: "Mardi Gras"
1954	Climax!		Episode: "Epitaph for a Spy"
1954–59	Schlitz Playhouse	Dr. Colman	2 Episodes: "At the Natchez Inn" and "And Practically Strangers"
1955	Passport to Danger	Hoenschen	Episode: "Rome"
1955	Lux Video Theatre	Major Strasser	Episode: "Casablanca"
1955	Soldiers of Fortune	Dr. Harman	Episode: "The Honor of Dr. Mazaro"
1955–56	Crusader	Thomas Ulm / August Bonner	2 episodes: "The Bargain" and "Berlin Love Story"
1956	Four Star Playhouse	Volpe	Episode: "Safe Keeping"
1956	Matinee Theater	Urbain	Episode: "The American"
1956	The Joseph Cotten Show: On Trial	Von Bering	Episode: "The Trial of Edward Pritchard"
1956	Playhouse 90	Carl Kersch	Episode: "Confession"
1956	The 20th Century Fox Hour	Steuben	Episode: "Operation Cicero"
1956–57	The Adventures of Jim Bowie	Maurice Toulouse	5 episodes
1956–57	Navy Log	German Officer	2 episodes: "The Helium Umbrella" and "After You, Ludwig"
1958	Jane Wyman Presents The Fireside Theatre	Ambassador	Episode: "Day of Glory"
1958	Northwest Passage	Father Ricard	Episode: "The Hostage"
1958	Man with a Camera	Doctor Kolberg	Episode: "Lady on the Loose"
1959	Alcoa Presents: One Step Beyond	Inspector	Episode: "The Dark Room"
1959	The Third Man	Dr. Fourtier	Episode: "The Indispensable Man"
1959	Markham	Stephen Saltzman	Episode: "Double Negative"
1959	World of Giants		Episode: "Gambling Story"
1959–64	Perry Mason	Fred Schoenbeck / Dr. Kleinman	2 episodes: "The Case of the Shattered Dream" and "The Case of a Place Called Midnight"
1960	Not for Hire	Masters / Mueller / Schoenberg	3 episodes
1962	Walt Disney's Wonderful World of Color	Professor Levenson	2 episodes: "Escapade in Florence: Part 1" and "Escapade in Florence: Part 2"
1964–66	Voyage to the Bottom of the Sea	Commander / Klaus	2 episodes: "The Price of Doom" and "The Death Ship"
1965	The Rogues	Mitter	Episode: "Run for the Money"
1965	Combat!	Doctor	Episode: "Odyssey"
1965	Bob Hope Presents the Chrysler Theatre	Baron	Episode: "The Game"
1965	Burke's Law	Wexler	Episode: "The Man with the Power"
1965	Honey West	Lazlo Shatzi	Episode: "Rockabye the Hard Way"
1966	Batman	Parkhurst	Episode: "The Clock King's Crazy Crimes"
1966	The Girl from U.N.C.L.E.	Professor Voltan	Episode: "The Danish Blue Affair"
1966	12 O'Clock High	Tanzman	Episode: "To Seek and Destroy"
1967	Mission: Impossible	Plantinov	Episode: "The Trial"
1967	Hogan's Heroes	General von Katz	Episode: "D–Day at Stalag 13"
1967	Felony Squad	Mannheim	Episode: "The Pat Hand of Death"
1967–69	The Wild Wild West	Ambassador / Bishop Kucharyk	2 episodes: "The Night of the Cossacks" and "The Night of the Surreal McCoy", (final appearance)
1968	Garrison's Gorillas	Dr. Bergholtz / Dr. Moletti	2 episodes: "Time Bomb" and "The Big Lie"
1968	Bonanza	Thad Borchik	Episode: "Commitment at Angelus"
1968	It Takes a Thief	Kruger / Maitre	2 episodes: "Get Me to the Revolution on Time" and "It Takes One to Know One"
1969	Ironside	Dr. Driscoll	Episode: "In Search of an Artist"

== Partial stage credits ==
Year	Title	Role(s)	Venue	Notes
1926	The Jeweled Tree	Face-Turned-Backward, Ahmes	48th Street Theatre, New York	
1927–28	Harry Delmar's Revels	Performer	Shubert Theatre, New York	
1933	Marathon	Luis Borkofski	Mansfield Theatre, New York	
1936	Star Spangled	Prof. Jake Niebieski	John Golden Theatre, New York	
1936–37	Hamlet	Ensemble member	Empire Theatre, New York	
1936–37	Hamlet	Ensemble member	St. James Theatre, New York	
1939	Foreigners	The Russian	Belasco Theatre, New York	
1940	The Burning Deck	Nicholas	Maxine Elliott's Theatre, New York	
1940	Russian Bank	Revolutionary	St. James Theatre, New York	
1941	The Walrus and the Carpenter	Corder	Cort Theatre, New York	
