= Leila Hadley =

American travel writer and socialite

Leila Hadley (22 September 1925 – 10 February 2009) was an American travel writer and socialite. Her books include Give Me the World (1958) and A Journey with Elsa Cloud (1997).

== Early life and education ==
Beatrice Leila Eliott Burton was born on September 22, 1925, and grew up in Old Westbury, New York. Her mother, Beatrice Eliott Burton, was the sister of Sir Gilbert Eliott, chief of the Scottish Clan Elliot. James Boswell was her great-great-great-great grandfather. Her father, Frank V. Burton Jr., inherited his business in the cotton trade. Her middle name, which she took as her first name, was pronounced "LEE-la" and was, according to her, "Hindi for 'cosmic play,' which should register in anyone’s mind forever, but doesn't". She attended the Green Vale School, Long Island, with Gloria Vanderbilt, then St. Timothy's School, Stevenson, Maryland. She was introduced to society at the Junior Assembly on December 23, 1943, held at the Ritz-Carlton Hotel in Manhattan.

== Marriages and divorces ==
She married Arthur Twining Hadley II, a Lieutenant in a Tank destroyer battalion, and the grandson of Arthur Twining Hadley, president of Yale University, on March 2, 1944. After the birth of her son, Arthur Twining Hadley III, in February 1945, her 18-month marriage ended in divorce in 1947.

Hadley obtained employment in public relations, first working for cartoonist Al Capp and was described in a 1950 article in Look magazine as "the chic, high-level, in-the-know, celebrity-surrounded career girl that millions of young women dream of becoming in New York." She later was publicity director for The Howdy Doody Show.

In 1953, she married geologist and inventor Yvor Hyatt Smitter. They divorced in 1969, after having three children.

In 1969, she married 27-year-old Swedish ship chandler Hans Gillner.

In 1976, she married businessman William C. Musham; they divorced in 1979. January 1990 she married her fifth husband, Henry Luce III. That marriage lasted until Luce's death in September 2005.

== Trip around the world ==
Hadley quit her job in 1951 and took her son Arthur Twining Hadley III, known as Kippy, then six years old, on a trip around the world that lasted 18 months. She sailed on a barkantine schooner from Singapore to Ceylon, then from Beirut to Malta. It was on the schooner where she met geologist Yvor Hyatt Smitter, the son of Faith (née Winters) and Wessel Smitter (author, F.O.B. Detroit). S.J. Perelman, who urged her to take the trip in the first place, then encouraged her to write Give Me the World (1958) about her journey.

After returning to America and marrying Smitter on 24 January 1953, she lived in South Africa, then in Jamaica, West Indies. She worked at Diplomat magazine in 1966 and at The Saturday Evening Post as cartoon editor in 1968–69. She wrote a number of books, including How to Travel with Children in Europe (1963), Fielding's Guide to Traveling with Children in Europe (1972) and Traveling with Children in the U.S.A. (1976). She co-wrote the 1966 book Manners for Young People with John Barclay, who gave dancing lessons to children at the Pierre Hotel.

== India and A Journey with Elsa Cloud ==
In March 1978, for two months, she visited her daughter, Victoria Barlow, who was living in Dharamsala, India, where she had been studying Buddhism at the Library of Tibetan Works and Archives and in Manali, in meditation retreat. The trip became the inspiration for her book A Journey with Elsa Cloud, which provided a fictionalized account of her own experiences. The book's title was derived from the private name, elsa cloud, her daughter created as a 15-year-old runaway, when she daydreamed she would like to be the sea or else a cloud; elsa cloud. Her daughter denounced the book.

The trip triggered an interest in Tibetan people. She became a member of the board of Tibet House and her experiences on her trip became the source of her 1979 pamphlet Tibet 20 Years After the Chinese Takeover.

In 1976, she married businessman William Musham; the marriage ended in divorce two years later, due in part, according to Musham's son, to Hadley's "decadent" behavior and lifestyle. On January 5, 1990, she married Henry Luce III, son of Henry Robinson Luce, the co-founder of Time and head of The Henry Luce Foundation. The couple remained together until his death in 2005.

== Allegations by daughter and granddaughter ==
In 2003, Hadley's daughter, Caroline Smitter Nicholson, claimed that Leila Hadley Luce and Henry Luce III, who died in 2005, had sexually abused her, as well as Caroline's daughter, in the 1990s. Caroline claimed that Henry "Hank" Luce III had repeatedly tried to rape her when she was a teenager, and had sexually abused her over a six-year span in the 1970s. She claimed to have been lured into bed by Luce and her mother. Hadley denied the allegations, and insisted that the suit had been an attempt to obtain money from her. Son Matthew also challenged Caroline's version of events. Charges were dismissed in 2004; a civil suit was settled out of court shortly before Hadley died.

== Death ==
Hadley, who had suffered from emphysema for many years, died at age 83 on February 10, 2009, at her home in Manhattan. She also lived on Fishers Island, New York, where she is buried next to Henry Luce III at the Union Chapel. She was survived by her eldest son, Dr. Arthur T. Hadley III, Matthew Eliott (who had changed his last name from Smitter in the 1970s), Caroline Smitter Nicholson, Victoria California Van Duzer Barlow, stepson Henry Christopher Luce, stepdaughter Lila Luce, and seven grandchildren.
