= Jane Lahr =

American editor and publisher (born 1943)

- Born: September 2, 1943 (age 82)
- Occupations: Editor; anthologist; literary agent
- Notable work: Searching for Mary Magdalene: A Journey Through Art and Literature
- Spouse: Martin Gottfried (div.)
- Children: Maya Gottfried
- Father: Bert Lahr
- Relatives: John Lahr (brother)

Jane Lahr (born September 2, 1943) is an American author, editor, and literary agent, the daughter of actor Bert Lahr, and sister of The New Yorker drama critic John Lahr.

After studying art at The Slade School of Fine Art at University College London and working with sculptor Rhys Caparn, she began working at publisher Harry N. Abrams, Inc., where she pioneered the area of Special Sales and became Director of Advertising Publicity and Promotion. She left to help co-found Stewart, Tabori & Chang (STC), where she was pivotal in the packaging and marketing of Grandmother Remembers, and co-edited Love: a Celebration in Art & Literature with Lena Tabori, now in its 24th year in publication.

Books that Lahr packaged include: Jean Howard’s Hollywood and Only the Best. She edited The Celtic Quest, a selection of both the Book of the Month Club and the Literary Guild. Her book Searching for Mary Magdalene: A Journey in Art & Literature published in 2007 by Welcome Books, and distributed by Random House in 2007, won a Silver Independent Publisher Book Award in the category of religion. In 2007 she co-edited Speaking from the Heart: Ethics, Reincarnation & What it Means to Be Human, with Joan Grant. She is partner in a book packaging/agenting company "Lahr & Partners, LLC".

Lahr was married to theater critic and author Martin Gottfried, and is now married to Sherman E. Crites. She has a daughter, Maya Gottfried, who is a writer.

Lahr is on the Board of Directors of The School of Images in New York City, a school founded by Dr. Catherine Shainberg in 1982, as well as the Board of the Abby Whiteside Foundation.

== Bibliography ==
- Love a Celebration in Art & Literature by Jane Lahr and Lena Tabori, Stewart Tabori & Chang 1981 (ISBN 978-1-58479112-6)
- Grandmother Remembers by Judith Levy, Stewart Tabori & Chang, 1983 (ISBN 978-0-94143432-4)
- Searching for Mary Magdalene: A Journey Through Art and Literature by Jane Lahr, Welcome Books, 2006 (ISBN 978-1-93218389-4)
- The Celtic Quest edited by Jane Lahr, Welcome Books, 2007 (ISBN 978-1-59962045-9)
- Speaking from the Heart: Ethics, Reincarnation & What it Means to Be Human by Joan Grant, Overlook Press, 2007 (ISBN 978-1-58567898-3)
