= Harry Delmar =

American film director

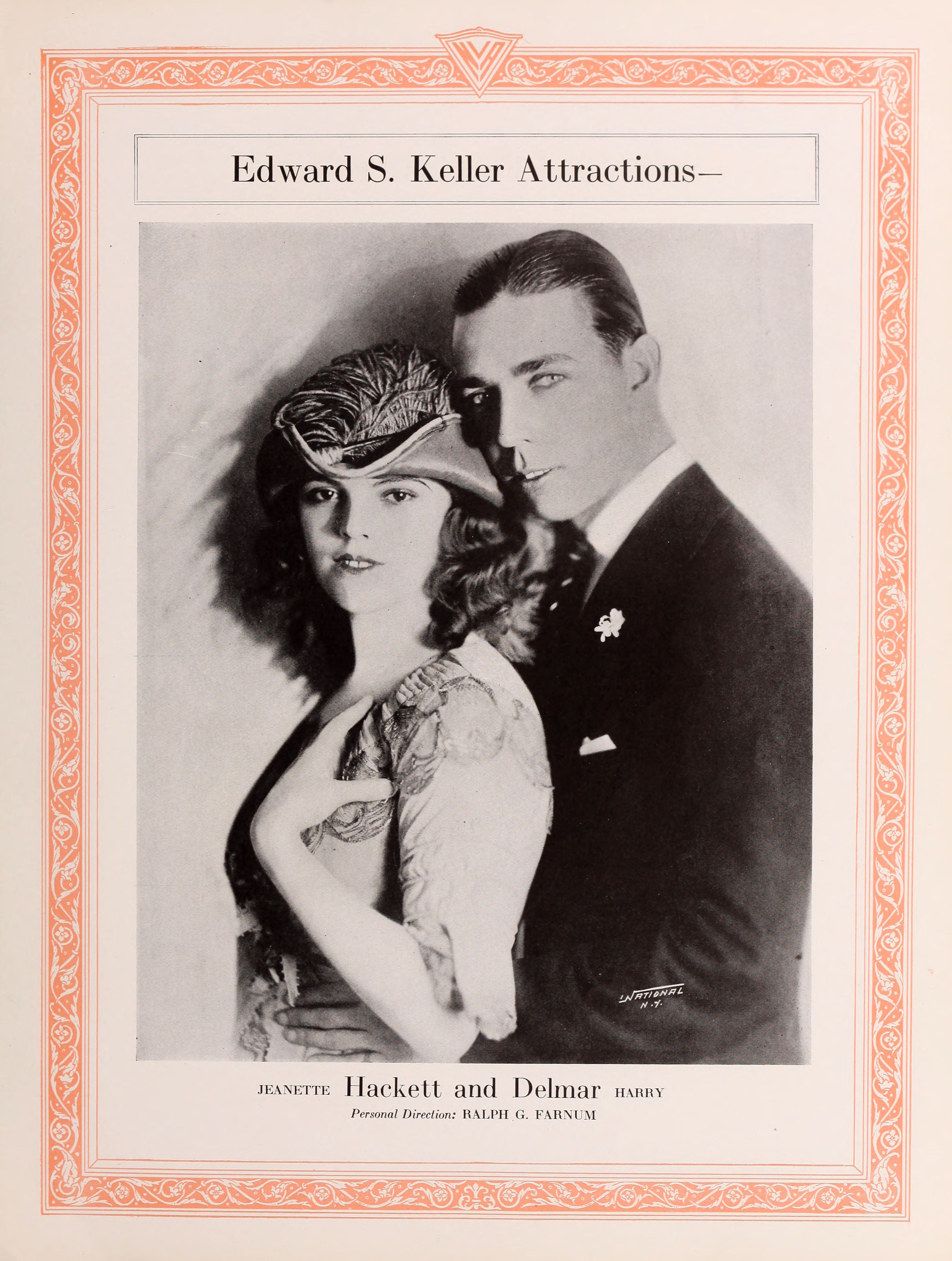
Delmar with his dancer partner Jeanette Hackett.

Harry Delmar (September 8, 1892 – August 29, 1984) was an American Broadway producer and later film director. He was born in Missouri, US. and died in Los Angeles. Prior to his stint as a Broadway producer, Delmar began his career as a Vaudeville song and dance man.

"Harry Delmar's Revels" was a musical revue on Broadway, containing songs, women and Vaudeville skits. The book was by William K. Wells; lyrics by Ballard MacDonald, Billy Rose; music by Lester Lee, Jesse Greer, Jimmy Monaco. It ran November 28, 1927 – March 1928 at the Shubert Theatre. Delmar hired some of the finest stars of the day, with a cast including Hugh Cameron and Patsy Kelly. He also gave Bert Lahr his Broadway debut.

With the advent of sound in films, Delmar transferred his skills to the silver screen. Starting as a writer and moving quickly to director and producer. He utilized his experience with revues as inspiration for his films, many of which included the Eddie Elkins Orchestra.

At the end of his life, Delmar was working with Buddy Feyne to produce his revue Up Your Alley.

== Filmography ==
Writer:

- After the Show (1929)
- Syncopated Trial (1929)

Director:

- America or Bust (1930)
- Sixteen Sweeties (1930)
- Ride 'em Cowboy (1930)
- A Night in a Dormitory (1930)
- Her Hired Husband (1930)
- After the Show (1929)
- Syncopated Trial (1929)

Producer:

- A Night in a Dormitory (1930)
- Her Hired Husband (1930)
- After the Show (1929)
