= John Steel (singer) =

American tenor

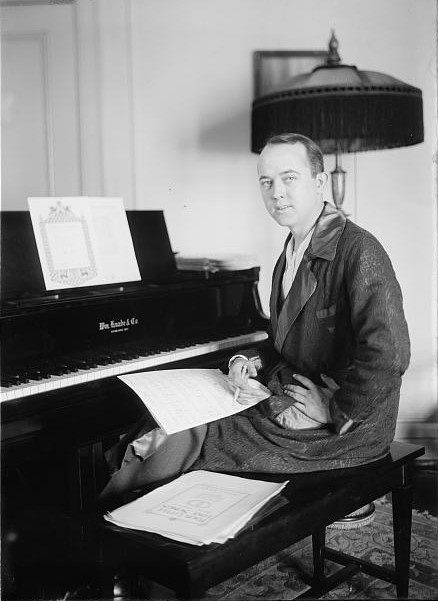
John Steel photographed by George Grantham Bain

John W. Steel (January 11, 1895 – June 25, 1971; sometimes referred to as John Steele) was an American tenor. He was featured in the Ziegfeld Follies of 1919 and 1920 and Irving Berlin's Music Box Revues of 1922 and 1923.

== Biography ==
=== Early life ===
Steel was born in Montclair, New Jersey, on January 11, 1895, and grew up in the New York City area. He served in the military during World War I, and studied music in Paris during leaves of absence from military duty.

=== Career ===
In 1918 Steel appeared on Broadway in the musical The Maid of the Mountains, which had been a hit in London, but closed in New York after just 37 performances. This was followed by his appearance in the Ziegfeld Follies of 1919, in which he was one of the show's most popular performers. In the 1919 Follies he introduced Irving Berlin's song "A Pretty Girl is Like a Melody," as well as singing "My Baby's Arms" and "Tulip Time." Producer Florenz Ziegfeld is said to have paid him $3,500 a week for this show. In later years, Irving Berlin said that he had composed "A Pretty Girl is Like a Melody" with Steel in mind.

Subsequent performances included appearances in the Ziegfeld Follies of 1920, Ziegfeld's "Midnight Frolic" in 1920, and Irving Berlin's Music Box Revues of 1922 and 1923. In the Ziegfeld Follies of 1920 he introduced the songs "Tell Me, Little Gypsy," "The Girls of My Dreams," and "The Love Boat." In the Music Box Revue of 1923 he introduced songs including "One Girl" and "Little Butterfly" and joined with Florence Moore, Ivy Sawyer, Joseph Santley, Grace Moore and Frank Tinney to sing the novelty song "Yes, We Have No Bananas". As of 1921, he reportedly was paid between $1,000 and $2,000 weekly by Ziegfeld.

In 1922 Steel began touring the United States on a summer vaudeville circuit. He preferred vaudeville to musical theatre because vaudeville allowed him to choose the songs he wanted to sing instead of performing an assigned role. Additionally, he liked working in Los Angeles and the West Coast states of California, Oregon, and Washington. In addition to singing, in Los Angeles he appeared as an amateur boxer in staged matches.

In 1927 he appeared in a London production of the musical Castles in the Air, playing the role of John Brown opposite soprano Helen Gilliland. Although the show closed in London after just 28 performances, after it closed in London it toured through the United Kingdom for the remainder of the year and well into 1928.

Steel returned to the United States, where in the early 1930s he performed in vaudeville and in cabarets and clubs in New York, Chicago, and other cities. In August 1938 he filed for bankruptcy, with liabilities of $40,070 against assets of just $350. In later years he worked as a singing instructor.

=== Personal life ===
Steel had a tempestuous marital history. In 1919, he married Sidonie Espero, another member of the cast of The Maid of the Mountains. A son, John W. Steel, Jr., was born to the marriage on June 14, 1921. The marriage foundered in 1921 amid allegations that Steel had abused his wife and abandoned her and the infant child. It ended in divorce in 1925.

Shortly after his divorce from Sidonie Espero, Steel married Mabel Stapleton, a professional violinist. They appeared together in a series of concerts. In 1929 he was named as co-respondent in the divorce suit of Walter P. Inman, a stepson of tobacco magnate James Buchanan Duke. Inman accused his wife (Helen Garnet Patten Inman) of infidelity with Steel. In April 1930, in the wake of the highly publicized Inman divorce case, Mabel Steel sued John Steel for divorce. Mabel Steel was then living in Paris, and it was revealed that the couple had been living apart since 1927.

Steel's third wife was Jeanette Hackett, a former dancer. Their son, Donn Raymond Steel, was born in 1930.

Steel died in New York City on June 25, 1971, aged 76. . His wife, Jeanette Hackett Steel, survived him. His son, Donn Steel, died in 1993.

== Recordings ==
There are about 40 known recordings of John Steel's work. Almost all of these were made between 1919 and 1923 in New York City for Victor. His contract with Victor ended in 1923. His final three known recordings were made for Columbia in London in 1927.
