= Mercedes Delpino =

American actress

Mercedes Delpino Lahr
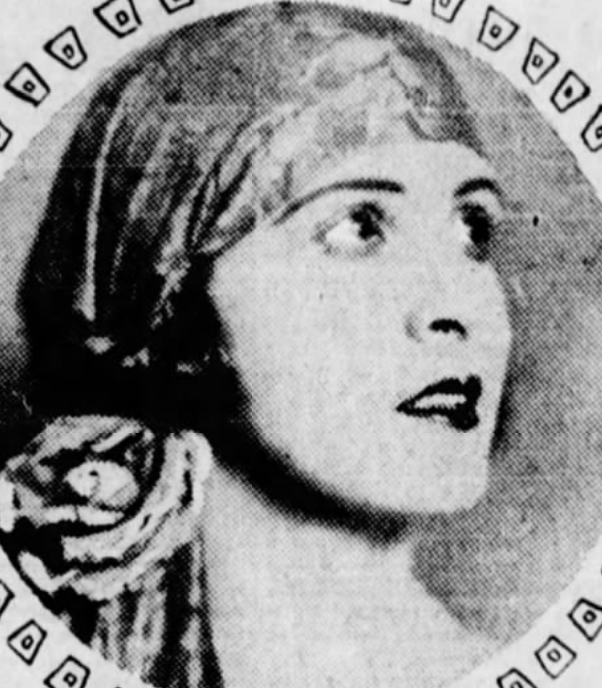
- Mercedes Delpino Lahr, from a 1926 newspaper
- Born: Mercedes Del Pino Rodríguez; February 19, 1898; San Juan, Puerto Rico
- Died: May 12, 1965 (aged 67); Tucson, Arizona, US
- Other names: Mercedes Delpino Lahrheim (married name), E. Mercedes (stage name)
- Occupation: Actress
- Spouse: Bert Lahr (m. 1929; ann. 1939)
- Children: Herbert Edward Lahr

Mercedes Delpino (February 19, 1898 – May 12, 1965) was an American dancer and comedian, born in Puerto Rico. She was half of a successful vaudeville and burlesque comedy act in the 1920s with Bert Lahr, who was also her husband.

== Early life ==
Delpino was born in San Juan, Puerto Rico and raised in New York City. Second daughter of Roberto Del Pino and Isabel Rodríguez Delgado.

== Career ==
Delpino was a chorus girl, comedian, and dancer, touring the United States and Canada on the vaudeville and burlesque stages in the 1920s. She was described as "one of the most beautiful women on vaudeville... dark and alluring". She shared an "ultra smart" comedy act with comedian Bert Lahr, usually billed as "Lahr & Mercedes". They were on Broadway together in Harry Delmar's Revels in 1927; by then, bouts of mental instability were beginning to affect her work, and she left the stage while Lahr continued to greater success.

In 1997, archival footage of Mercedes Delpino Lahr appeared in a documentary about vaudeville, part of the American Masters series on PBS.

== Personal life and legacy ==
Delpino and Lahr had a son together, Herbert Edward Lahr, in 1928. They were married from 1929 until 1939, when the marriage was annulled on the basis of her longterm chronic mental illness, so that he was able to remarry. She was institutionalized, and later lived in her sister Isabel's home. She died at home in 1965, aged 67 years, in Tucson, Arizona. The play Max and Maxie by James McLure is a fictionalized account of her life with Lahr; the Maxie character, based on Delpino, was played by Sandy Roveta in the show's 1989 New York run.
