= John Lahr =

American theater critic (born 1941)

John Henry Lahr
- Born: John Henry Lahr; July 12, 1941 (age 85); Los Angeles, California, U.S.
- Education: Worcester College, Oxford; Yale University
- Occupations: Theater critic; writer; biographer
- Spouses: Anthea Mander (m. 1965, divorced) Connie Booth (m. 2000)
- Children: 1
- Parent(s): Bert Lahr (father); Mildred Schroeder (mother)
- Relatives: Jane Lahr (sister)
- Writing career
- Years active: 1968–2013
- Website: johnlahr.com

John Henry Lahr (born July 12, 1941) is an American theater critic and writer. From 1992 to 2013, he was a staff writer and the senior drama critic at The New Yorker. He has written more than 20 books related to theater, including Tennessee Williams: Mad Pilgrimage of the Flesh, and won many awards for his work.

== Early life and education ==
John Henry Lahr was born on July 12, 1941 in Los Angeles, California, to a Jewish family. He is the son of Mildred "Millie" Schroeder, a Ziegfeld girl, and Bert Lahr, an actor and comedian most famous for portraying the Cowardly Lion in The Wizard of Oz.

Until his father was on the cover of Time magazine when Lahr was in grade school, he did not know what he did for a living. Lahr later wrote: "On stage, Dad was sensational; in private he was sensationally taciturn: a brooding absent presence, to be encountered mostly in his bedroom chair at his desk, turned away from us...". However, Lahr did spend a lot of time with his father at theaters playing with props and costumes. His childhood was also filled with access to Hollywood and Vaudeville celebrities who were his father's friends, such as Eddie Foy Jr., Buster Keaton, Groucho Marx, and Ethel Merman.

When his father left movies for the stage, the family moved from their home in Coldwater Canyon to Manhattan.

Lahr received a B.A. from Yale University. While there, he was a member of the literary fraternity of St. Anthony Hall and was an editor of the Yale Daily News. He also has a master's degree from Worcester College, Oxford University.

== Career ==
=== Theater ===
Lahr started his career managing theaters. In 1968, he was a literary adviser to the Guthrie Theatre in Minneapolis, Minnesota. He was an advisor to the Vivian Beaumont Theatre in Manhattan, New York from 1969 to 1971. He also was a literary consultant for the Lincoln Center's Repertory Theater in the 1970s.

He has adapted several books for the stage; these plays were performed at the Royal National Theatre in London, the Mark Taper Forum in Los Angeles, the Royal Exchange in Manchester, and in the West End of London.

In 2002, he co-wrote Elaine Stritch's one-woman show Elaine Stritch at Liberty. He and Stritch won a Tony Award and the Drama Desk Award for Outstanding Book of a Musical for the show. However, Lahr sued Strich, claiming she "cheated him of profits" from the play.

=== Critic and writer ===
Lahr became a contributing editor to Evergreen Review in 1967. At the same time, he was a freelance theater critic for The Village Voice and as a general theater editor for Grove Press. He has also written for British Vogue, BroadwayWorld, the Daily Mail, Esquire, The Guardian, The Nation, The New Indian Express, The New Republic, The New York Times, The Paris Review, Slate, and The Telegraph.

In 1992, when he was fifty years old, Lahr became a staff writer and a senior drama critic at The New Yorker magazine. He wrote profiles, reviews, and behind-the-scenes portraits. He also began reviewing regional and international theater, expanding the magazine's coverage beyond Broadway for the first time. His profiles are biographies consisting of 8,000 to 10,000 words. Each article takes him three to four months to write and research. Throughout his time at The New Yorker, Lahr profiled more than forty actors, including Woody Allen, Roseanne Barr, Ingmar Bergman, Cate Blanchett, Judi Dench, Bob Hope, Eddie Izzard, Tony Kushner, David Mamet, Arthur Miller, Helen Mirren, Mira Nair, Mike Nichols, and Al Pacino. One unique aspect of a profile by him is that "Lahr typically receives more access to his subjects than they've ever allowed before. Just as he wants to write about them, they want to be written about in his magazine." For example, Sean Penn gave his mother's telephone number to Lahr.

In 2000, his compilation book, Show and Tell: New Yorker Profiles, included a profile of his mother who was a Ziegfeld Follies girl. Lahr's most recent book, Joy Ride: Show People and Their Shows in the US (2015), is a collection of his New Yorker profiles on playwrights and directors, as well as some of his reviews of their work.

In 2015, Lahr admitted he got death threats for not liking a musical by Stephen Sondheim.

He retired from The New Yorker in 2013. His 21-year stint is the longest in the magazine's history. He is currently a chief theater critic emeritus of The New Yorker and writes two profiles a year.

=== Film ===
In 1987, Lahr co-produced Prick Up Your Ears, a film version of his 1978 book about British playwright Joe Orton, Prick Up Your Ears: The Biography of Joe Orton. Lahr was portrayed in the film by Wallace Shawn.

Lahr has also written movie scripts, including the short film Sticky My Fingers...Fleet My Feet which was nominated for a 1971 Academy Award for Best Short Subject, Live Action Subjects.

=== Author ===
When Lahr was 21 years old, he decided to connect to his father by writing a biography. Eight years later, he finished the biography called Notes on a Cowardly Lion, the week before his father died. Since then, he has written many other books, including the novels and biographies of theatrical figures. His biographies include the Australian comedian Barry Humphries, Joe Orton, and Frank Sinatra.

In 1994, Lahr published an expose in The New Yorker detailing the behavior of Lady Maria St. Just, the literary executor of playwright Tennessee Williams's estate. Lahr's profile helped Lyle Leverich publish Tom: The Unknown Tennessee Williams after "a five-year legal stranglehold" by St. Just. In 2000, Leverich died while working on a planned second volume about Williams, and named Lahr as his successor in this project; Lahr agreed to complete the book, covering Williams from 1945 to his death in 1983.

Lahr's stand-alone biography, Tennessee Williams: Mad Pilgrimage of the Flesh, was published in 2014. In the United States, the biography won the National Book Critics Circle Award, the American Academy of Arts and Letters Vursell Award, and the Lambda Literary Award for the best gay biography. In the United Kingdom, it won the 2015 Sheridan Morley Prize for Theatre Biography.

== Recognition and awards ==
In 2014, in a review of Tennessee Williams: Mad Pilgrimage of the Flesh for The Guardian, journalist, historian, and author Alexander Larman called Lahr "one of the greatest biographers writing today".

He has won a number of awards, including:

- Harold D. Vursell Memorial Award, American Academy of Arts and Letters (2015)
- Sheridan Morley Prize for Theatre Biography – Tennessee Williams: Mad Pilgrimage of the Flesh (2015)
- Lambda Literary Award for Gay Memoir/Biography – Tennessee Williams: Mad Pilgrimage of the Flesh (2014)
- National Book Award Finalist, National Book Foundation – Tennessee Williams: Mad Pilgrimage of the Flesh (2014)
- National Book Critics Circle Award – Tennessee Williams: Mad Pilgrimage of the Flesh (2014)
- Tony Award for Special Theatrical Event – Elaine Stritch at Liberty (2002)
- Drama Desk Award for Outstanding Book of a Musical – Elaine Stritch at Liberty (2002)
- ASCAP Deems Taylor Award for Writers, Editors, Publishers — for his work for The New Yorker (1998)
- ASCAP Deems Taylor Award for Writers, Editors, Publishers — for Sinatra's Song (1997)
- George Jean Nathan Award for Dramatic Criticism – for reviews in The New Yorker (1993–1994)
- Roger Machell Prize for the best book on the performing arts – Dame Edna Everage and the Rise of Western Civilization (1992)
- ASCAP Deems Taylor Award for Writers, Editors, Publishers — for his work with The New Republic (1982)
- George Jean Nathan Award for Dramatic Criticism – for "In Search of a New Mythology", Evergreen Review, January 1969 and reviews in The Village Voice (1968–1968)
- The National Arts Club Medal of Honor for Achievement in Theatre
- Yale writing prize
- American Film Institute Award
- The Wall Street Journal Fellowship

== Personal life ==
In July 1965, Lahr became engaged to Anthea Mander of Wightwick Manor in Wolverhampton, whom he met while they both were attending Oxford University. She was the daughter of the Liberal politician, art patron, and industrialist Sir Geoffrey Mander. They married on August 12, 1965, at St. Peter's Church in Eaton Square, London. They also had a second wedding in New York City for Lahr's parents, who were unable to travel to England. After their marriage, they lived in New York City. They have a son named Christopher.

Lahr moved to London in 1973. While he was still working for The New Yorker, he divided his time between the two cities, spending two weeks in New York City a month, returning home to London for the rest of the month. Rather than maintaining a residence in New York, he rented the maid's room of producer Margo Lion's apartment.

Lahr began a relationship with US-born ex-pat actress Connie Booth, co-writer and a cast member of Fawlty Towers and ex-wife of John Cleese, and they lived together for 15 years before marrying in 2000. They lived in Muswell Hill, north London, buying Jeremy Beadle's former home in 2007.

His sister is the editor and writer Jane Lahr.

Lahr contributed to John Kerry's presidential campaign and Democratic organizations.

== Bibliography ==
=== Books ===
==== Biographies and profiles ====
- Notes on a Cowardly Lion (Knopf, 1970) ISBN 978-0713901672
- The Business of Rainbows: The Life and Lyrics of E.Y. Harburg (Holt, Rinehart, and Winston, 1978) ISBN 9781585674237
- Prick Up Your Ears: The Biography of Joe Orton (Lane, 1978) ISBN 978-0713910445
- Coward the Playwright (University of California Press, 1983) ISBN 978-0520234147
- Dame Edna Everage and the Rise of Western Civilization: Backstage with Barry Humphries (Bloomsbury, 1991) ISBN 978-0747510215
- Sinatra: The Artist and the Man (Random House, 1997) ISBN 978-0375501449
- Show and Tell: New Yorker Profiles (Overlook Press, 2000) ISBN 978-1585670628
- Honky Tonk Parade: New Yorker Profiles of Show People (Overlook Press, 2005) ISBN 978-1585677030
- Tennessee Williams: Mad Pilgrimage of the Flesh (W. W. Norton & Company, 2014) ISBN 978-0393021240
- Joy Ride: Show People and Their Shows (W. W. Norton & Company, 2015) ISBN 978-0393246407
- Arthur Miller: American Witness (Yale University Press, 2022) ISBN 9780300234923

==== Collected criticism ====
- Up Against the Fourth Wall (Grove Press, 1970) ISBN 978-0394172842
- A Casebook on Harold Pinter's "The Homecoming" (Grove Press, 1971) ISBN 978-0394172880
- Acting Out America: Essays on Modern Theater (Penguin, 1972) ISBN 978-0140214932
- Astonish Me: Adventures in Contemporary Theater (Viking 1973) ISBN 978-0670138876
- Life Show: How to See Theater in Life and Life in Theater (Viking, 1973, with Jonathan Price ISBN 978-0879101305
- Automatic Vaudeville: Essays on Star Turns (Knopf, 1984) ISBN 978-0394529769
- Light Fantastic: Adventures in Theatre (Bloomsbury, 1997) ISBN 978-0385315500

==== Fiction ====
- The Autograph Hound (Knopf, 1972) ISBN 978-0413167101
- Hot to Trot (Knopf, 1974) ISBN 978-0394493527

==== As editor ====
- Plays from the Eugene O'Neill Foundation (Grove Press, 1970)
- The Orton Diaries (HarperCollins, 1986) ISBN 978-0413736505
- The Diaries of Kenneth Tynan (Bloomsbury, 2002) ISBN 978-1582341606
- Gem of the Ocean ( Theatre Communications Group, 2003) ISBN 9781559362818

=== Plays and film adaptations ===
- Sticky My Fingers...Fleet My Feet (1969)
- Diary of a Somebody (Limelight Editions, 1989) ISBN 978-0879101244
- The Manchurian Candidate (Dramatist Play Service, 1993) ISBN 978-0822213390
- Accidental Death of an Anarchist
- The Bluebird of Unhappiness: A Woody Allen Revue
- Keys to the Kingdom (2019)
- Elaine Strich at Liberty (2002)

=== Essays and reporting ===
- Lahr, John. (January 1969) "In Search of a New Mythology", Evergreen Review, No. 62.
- — (Summer 1969) "Jules Feiffer: Interviewed by John Lahr.: The Transatlantic Review, 32: 38–47. (Note: Lahr, John (1969). Jules Feiffer: Interviewed by John Lahr. The Transatlantic Review, 32, 38–47, accessed May 21, 2022)
- — (November 24, 2008). "Land of Lost Souls". The Critics. Life and Letters. The New Yorker. **84** (38): 114–120.
- — (April 5, 2010). "Telling it like it is : 'The Glass Menagerie' re-imagined". The Critics. The Theatre. The New Yorker. Vol. 86, no. 8. pp. 82–83.
- — (November 15, 2010). "Angels on the Verge". The Critics. The Theatre. The New Yorker. **86** (36). Retrieved April 30, 2012.
- — (March 14, 2011). "Losers Take All". The Critics. The Theatre. The New Yorker. **87** (4): 62–64.
- — (April 4, 2011). "God Squad". The Critics. The Theatre. The New Yorker. **87** (7): 76–77. Retrieved October 7, 2014.
- — (November 7, 2011). "The Natural". Backstage Chronicles. The New Yorker. **87** (35): 31–37. Retrieved March 28, 2014.
- — (January 30, 2012). "Boldfaced Bard". The Critics. The Theatre. The New Yorker. **87** (46): 68–70.
- — (February 13–20, 2012). "A Talent to Abuse". The Critics. The Theatre. The New Yorker. **88** (1): 118–119.
- — (November 19, 2012). "Supersize". The Critics. The Theatre. The New Yorker. **88** (36): 94–95. Retrieved 2014-11-04.
- — (November 26, 2012). "Unhappy Families". The Critics. The Theatre. The New Yorker. **88** (37): 84–85.
- — (February 25, 2013). "Songs of Angry Men". The Talk of the Town. Credit Due Dept. The New Yorker. **89** (2): 26–27.
- — (March 31, 2014). "Joy ride: Susan Stroman puts 'Bullets over Broadway' on Broadway". Profiles. The New Yorker. **90** (6): 50–59.
- — (July 21, 2014) "A Last Lunch with Mike Nichols". Culture Desk. The New Yorker.
- — (September 15, 2014) "Caught in the Act: What Drives Al Pacino" Profiles. The New Yorker. **90** (27): 58 (Note: John, Lahr. 2014. "Caught In The Act". The New Yorker, September 15. Via EBSCO. Accessed May 21, 2022)
- — (November 24, 2014) "Poster Boy" The Boards. The New Yorker.
- — (September 21, 2015) "Julianne Moore, Beauty and the Beast". The New Yorker
- — (October 24, 2016) "The Dynamism of Janet McTeer." The New Yorker.
- — (December 19–26, 2016). "Act of Grace : Viola Davis Aims to Alter How African-Americans Are Seen". Profiles. The New Yorker. **92** (42): 52–64.
- — (July 31, 2017) "Postscript: Sam Shepard Who Brought Rage and Rebellion Onstage". The New Yorker.
- — (July 19, 2018) "Squealing to Survive", London Review of Books, 40 (14): 33–35.
- — (September 8, 2014) "When He Acted it was Like Jazz". Daily Telegraph (London). (Note: John Lahr. When he acted it was like jazz. Daily Telegraph (London). September 2014:8,9. Accessed May 22, 2022. via EBSCO, accessed May 21, 2022.)
- — (September 24, 2018) "Sam Mendes's Directional Discoveries". Profiles. The New Yorker.
- — (November 19, 2019) "Todd Haynes Rewrites the Hollywood Playbook". Profiles. The New Yorker.
- — (September 21, 2020). "The shape-shifter : the protean career of Ethan Hawke". Profiles. The New Yorker. Vol. 96, no. 28. pp. 44–51. (Note: Online version is titled "The many faces of Ethan Hawke".)
