= The Beauty Part =

1962 play by S. J. Perelman

- Original language: English
- Written by: S. J. Perelman
- Genre: Comedy

Premiere
- Date: December 26, 1962
- Place: Music Box Theatre; New York City

The Beauty Part is a 1962 stage play by S. J. Perelman.

== Production history ==
After the success of "Malice in Wonderland," a 1959 episode of the Omnibus television series based on S. J. Perelman's New Yorker humor pieces, Perelman began developing a similar project for the stage. The show consisted of satirical sketches loosely themed around what Perelman saw as "the widespread yearning for creativity" among untalented members of the American public; he pointed to an incident wherein an elevator operator told him "I'm having trouble with my second act."

In the summer of 1961, The Beauty Part had a pre-Broadway tryout at the Bucks County Playhouse in New Hope, Pennsylvania. The production starred Bert Lahr, who played five roles over the course of the evening: a scheming Hollywood producer, a lecherous garbage-disposal magnate, an enfeebled millionaire, a fame-hungry judge, and a female editor of erotica. Perelman did "at least" 10 rewrites of the script before a heavily altered version of the play opened on Broadway on December 26, 1962 at the Music Box Theatre, with a cast that included Lahr, Alice Ghostley, Charlotte Rae, and Larry Hagman.

The Beauty Part opened during the 1962-1963 New York City newspaper strike, meaning that very few reviews appeared and the play could not be advertised in print. Producer Michael Ellis attempted to promote the show via skywriting and fliers distributed in cigar stores, but his efforts were unsuccessful and the show closed on March 9, 1963 after 85 performances. Lahr and Ghostley were both nominated for Tony Awards for their performances. In subsequent years, the play's commercial failure has been attributed to high production costs, mismanagement, and the fact that Perelman's dialogue, "steeped in syntactical invention and idiomatic Yiddish," may have been more suited to the page. In 1992, The New York Times observed that "few flops have been as celebrated, mulled over and positively entitled to cult status as The Beauty Part.

Perelman hoped that Peter Sellers would star in a film adaptation of The Beauty Part and met with him in the summer of 1963 to discuss the project, but the film was never made.

A 1974 Off-Broadway revival starred Joseph Bova in Lahr's five roles, and a 1992 revival at the Yale Repertory Theatre featured MacIntyre Dixon in four of Lahr's roles.

== Awards and nominations ==
=== Original Broadway production ===
Year	Award	Category	Nominee	Result
1963	Tony Award	Best Actor in a Play	Bert Lahr	Nominated
1963	Tony Award	Best Featured Actress in a Play	Alice Ghostley	Nominated
