= S. J. Perelman =

American screenwriter (1904–1979)

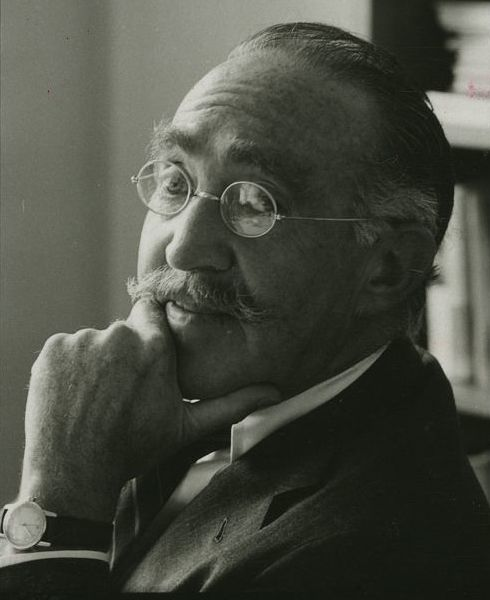
- Born: Sidney Joseph Perelman; February 1, 1904; New York City, U.S.
- Died: October 17, 1979 (aged 75); New York City, U.S.
- Education: Brown University
- Occupations: Author, screenwriter
- Spouse: Laura West (m. 1929; died 1970)
- Children: 2

Sidney Joseph Perelman (February 1, 1904 – October 17, 1979) was an American humorist and screenwriter. He is best known for his humorous short pieces written over many years for The New Yorker. He also wrote for several other magazines, including Judge, as well as books, scripts, and screenplays. Perelman received an Academy Award for screenwriting in 1956.

== Early life, family and education ==
Perelman was born in Brooklyn, New York City, the only son of Joseph and Sophie Perelman, who moved from one failed business to another until they found themselves raising chickens on a farm and running a dry goods store in Providence, Rhode Island.

He attended the Candace Street Grammar School and Classical High School in Providence. He entered Brown University in 1921, where he became editor of the campus humor magazine The Brown Jug in 1924.

== Career ==
Perelman dropped out of Brown and moved to Greenwich Village in Manhattan, New York City.

Perelman wrote many brief, humorous descriptions of his travels for various magazines, and of his travails on his Pennsylvania farm, all of which were collected into books. (A few were illustrated by caricaturist Al Hirschfeld, who accompanied Perelman on the round-the-world trip recounted in Westward Ha!.)

Perelman is highly regarded for his humorous short pieces that he published in magazines in the 1930s and 1940s, most often in The New Yorker. For these, he is considered the first surrealist humor writer of the United States. In these numerous brief sketches he pioneered a new and unique style, using parody to "wring every drop of false feeling or slovenly thinking."

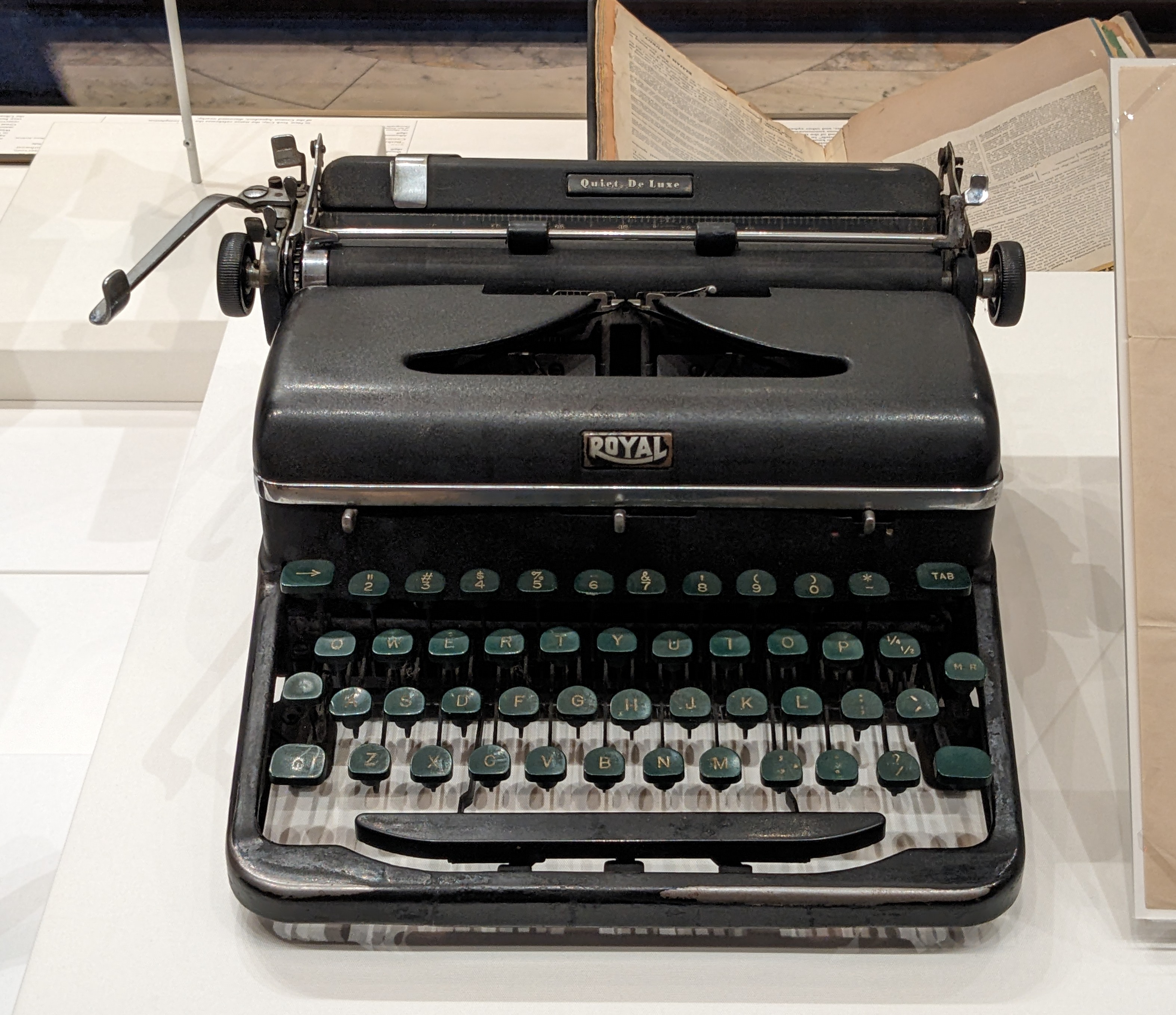
S. J. Perelman's typewriter (New York Public Library)

They were infused with a sense of ridicule, irony, and wryness and frequently used his own misadventures as their theme. Perelman chose to describe these pieces as feuilletons — a French literary term meaning "literary or scientific articles; serial stories" (literally "little leaves") — and he defined himself as a feuilletoniste. Perelman's only attempt at a conventional novel (Parlor, Bedlam and Bath, written in collaboration with Quentin Reynolds) was unsuccessful, and throughout his life he was resentful that authors who wrote in the full-length form of novels received more literary respect (and financial success) than short-form authors like himself even as he openly admired British humorist P.G. Wodehouse. While many believe Dawn Ginsbergh's Revenge to be a novel, it is actually his first collection of humorous pieces, many written while he was a student at Brown. It is largely considered juvenilia, and its pieces were never included in future Perelman collections.

The tone of Perelman's feuilletons was very different from those sketches of the inept "little man" struggling to cope with life that James Thurber and other New Yorker writers of the era frequently produced. Yet his references to himself were typically wittily self-deprecatory—as for example, "before they made S.J. Perelman, they broke the mold."

Sometimes he gleaned an apparently off-hand phrase from a newspaper article or magazine advertisement and would then write a brief, satiric play or sketch inspired by that phrase. A typical example is his 1950s work "No Starch in the Dhoti, S'il Vous Plait." Beginning with an off-hand phrase in a New York Times Magazine article ("...the late Pandit Motilal Nehru—who sent his laundry to Paris—the young Jawaharlal's British nurse etc. etc. ...), Perelman composed a series of imaginary letters that might have been exchanged in 1903 between an angry Pandit Nehru in India and a sly Parisian laundryman about the condition of his laundered underwear.

In other sketches, Perelman satirized popular magazines or story genres of his day. In "Somewhere a Roscoe," he pokes fun at the "purple prose" writing style of 1930s pulp magazines such as Spicy Detective. In "Swing Out, Sweet Chariot," he examines the silliness of the "jive language" found in The Jitterbug, a teen magazine with stories inspired by the 1930s Swing dance craze. Perelman voraciously read magazines to find new material for his sketches. (He often referred to the magazines as "Sauce for the gander.")

Perelman also occasionally used a form of word play that was, apparently, unique to him. He would take a common word or phrase and change its meaning completely within the context of what he was writing, generally in the direction of the ridiculous. In Westward Ha!, for instance, he writes: "The homeward-bound Americans were as merry as grigs (the Southern Railway had considerately furnished a box of grigs for purposes of comparison)". Another classic Perelman pun is "I've got Bright's Disease and he's got mine".

He also wrote a notable series of sketches called Cloudland Revisited in which he gives acid (and disillusioned) descriptions of recent viewings of movies (and recent re-readings of novels) that had enthralled him as a youth in Providence, Rhode Island, later as a student at Brown University, and then while a struggling comic artist in Greenwich Village.

A number of his works were set in Hollywood and in various places around the world. He stated that as a young man he was heavily influenced by James Joyce and Flann O'Brien, particularly his wordplay, obscure words and references, metaphors, irony, parody, paradox, symbols, free associations, clang associations, non-sequiturs, and sense of the ridiculous. All these elements infused Perelman's writings but his style was precise, clear, and the very opposite of Joycean stream of consciousness. Perelman dryly admitted to having been such a Ring Lardner thief that he should have been arrested. Woody Allen has in turn admitted to being influenced by Perelman and recently has written tributes in very much the same style. The two once happened to have dinner at the same restaurant, and when the elder humorist sent his compliments, the younger comedian mistook it for a joke. Authors that admired Perelman's ingenious style included T.S. Eliot and W. Somerset Maugham.

Frank Muir, a British expert on comic writing, lauded Perelman as the best American comic author of all time in his Oxford Book of Humorous Prose. Humorist Garrison Keillor has declared his admiration for Perelman's writing. Keillor's "Jack Schmidt, Arts Administrator" is a parody of Perelman's classic "Farewell, My Lovely Appetizer", itself a parody of the Raymond Chandler school of tough, amorous 'private-eye' crime fiction. Irish comedian and actor Dylan Moran listed Perelman as a major influence in his December 13, 2012 interview on the WTF with Marc Maron podcast (episode 343). He died in 1979.

== Broadway and film ==
Perelman wrote at least five original plays produced on Broadway from 1932 to 1963, two as collaborators with his wife Laura. The first was the musical revue Walk a Little Faster, which opened in December 1932. With Ogden Nash, he wrote the book for the musical One Touch of Venus (music by Kurt Weill, lyrics by Nash), which opened on Broadway in 1943 and ran for more than 500 performances. His final play The Beauty Part (1962), which starred Bert Lahr in multiple roles, fared less well, its short run attributed in part to the 114-day 1962 New York City newspaper strike.

In cinema, Perelman is noted for co-writing scripts for the Marx Brothers films Monkey Business (1931) and Horse Feathers (1932), and for the Academy Award-winning screenplay Around the World in 80 Days (1956).

Along with his explicit credits, Perelman and Laura West Perelman worked as contract screenwriters for Metro-Goldwyn-Mayer and made uncredited contributions for films such as Sweethearts (1938).

His official credits include:

- Monkey Business (1931)
- Horse Feathers (1932)
- Hold 'Em Jail (1932)
- Sitting Pretty (1933)
- Paris Interlude (1934)
- Florida Special (1936)
- Early to Bed (1936)
- Ambush (1939)
- Boy Trouble (1939)
- The Golden Fleecing (1940)
- One Touch of Venus (1948)
- Larceny, Inc. (1942) based on the Perelmans' Broadway play The Night Before Christmas
- Around the World in 80 Days (1956)
- Aladdin (1958), produced for television and featuring the final score written by Cole Porter

== Personal life ==
Perelman's personal life was difficult. In 1929 at the age of 25 he married the 18-year-old sister of his school friend Nathanael West, Laura West (née Lorraine Weinstein). The two worked as writing collaborators on the 1935 play All Good Americans, produced on Broadway, and both were signed by Irving Thalberg as contract screenwriters for Metro-Goldwyn-Mayer the same year. They remained married until Laura's death in 1970. Perelman did not remarry.

The marriage was strained from the start because of his innumerable affairs (notably with Leila Hadley).

Perelman spent most of his later life on an 83-acre property off Geigel Hill Road in Erwinnia, PA that he purchased in the 1930s. Life on the farm and its contrast to his experience of urban life on both coasts was a frequent source of inspiration in his columns, and his book Acres and Pains.

Perelman reportedly regarded children as a nuisance. His son Adam (born in 1936) committed several robberies in the mid-1950s, was accused of attempted rape, and ended up in a reformatory for wayward boys. The two things that brought Perelman happiness were his MG automobile and a mynah bird, both of which he pampered like babies. His Anglophilia turned rather sour when late in his life he (temporarily) relocated to England. He returned to New York in 1972, having concluded that "English life, while very pleasant, is rather bland. I expected kindness and gentility and I found it, but there is such a thing as too much couth."

Perelman had a problematic relationship with Groucho Marx, who once said of the writer, "I hated the son of a bitch, and he had a head as big as my desk." In the later years of Perelman's career, he bristled at being identified as a writer of Marx Brothers comedy, insisting that his publishers omit any mention of it in publicity material.

== Cultural influence ==
Perelman was indirectly responsible for the success of Joseph Heller's novel Catch-22. When first published, this novel received lukewarm reviews and indifferent sales. A few months later, Perelman was interviewed for a national publication. The interviewer asked Perelman if he had read anything funny lately. Perelman—a man not noted for generosity with his praise—went to considerable lengths to commend Catch-22. After the interview was published, sales of Heller's novel skyrocketed.

Perelman picked up plenty of pungent expressions from Yiddish and liberally sprinkled his prose with these phrases, thus paving the way for the likes of Philip Roth.

The phrase "crazy like a fox" gained popularity after Perelman used it as a book title in 1944.

== Bibliography ==
=== Books by S.J. Perelman ===
- Dawn Ginsbergh's Revenge (1929)
- Parlor, Bedlam and Bath (with Quentin Reynolds) (1930)
- Strictly from Hunger (1937)
- Look Who's Talking! (1940)
- The Dream Department (1943)
- Crazy Like a Fox (1944)
- Keep It Crisp (1946)
- Acres and Pains (1947)
- The Best of S.J. Perelman (1947)
- Westward Ha! (1948)
- Listen to the Mockingbird (1949)
- The Swiss Family Perelman (1950)
- A Child's Garden of Curses (UK) (1951)
- The Ill-Tempered Clavichord (1952)
- Hold that Christmas Tiger (UK) (1954)
- Perelman's Home Companion (1955)
- The Road to Miltown or Under the Spreading Atrophy (1957)
- Bite on the Bullet (UK title for Road to Miltown)(1957)
- The Most of S.J. Perelman (collection of re-printed pieces) (1958)
- The Rising Gorge (1961)
- The Beauty Part (1961)
- Chicken Inspector No. 23 (1966)
- Baby, It's Cold Inside (1970)
- Vinegar Puss (1975)
- Eastward Ha! (1977)
- The Last Laugh (1981)
- That Old Gang o' Mine (1984)
- Don't Tread on Me: Selected Letters of S.J. Perelman (1987)
- Conversations with S.J. Perelman (1995)
- The World of S.J. Perelman (UK reprinted pieces) (2000)
- Writings (Library of America)(2021)

=== Books about S.J. Perelman ===
- Fowler, Douglas. S.J. Perelman. Twayne Publishers, (1983).
- Gale, Steven H. S.J. Perelman A Critical Study. Greenwood Press, (1987).
- Hermann, Dorothy. S.J. Perelman – A Life. G. P. Putnam's Sons, (1986). ISBN 0-399-13154-X
- Lister, Eric. Don't Mention the Marx Brothers: Reminiscences of S.J. Perelman (UK)(1985)
- Wilk, Max. And Did You Once See Sidney Plain? A Random Memoir of S.J. Perelman. (1986)

=== Humor pieces ===
- Perelman, S. J. (January 1, 1949). "Stringing Up Father". The New Yorker. Vol. 24, no. 45. pp. 16–17.
