= Bert Lahr =

American actor (1895–1967)

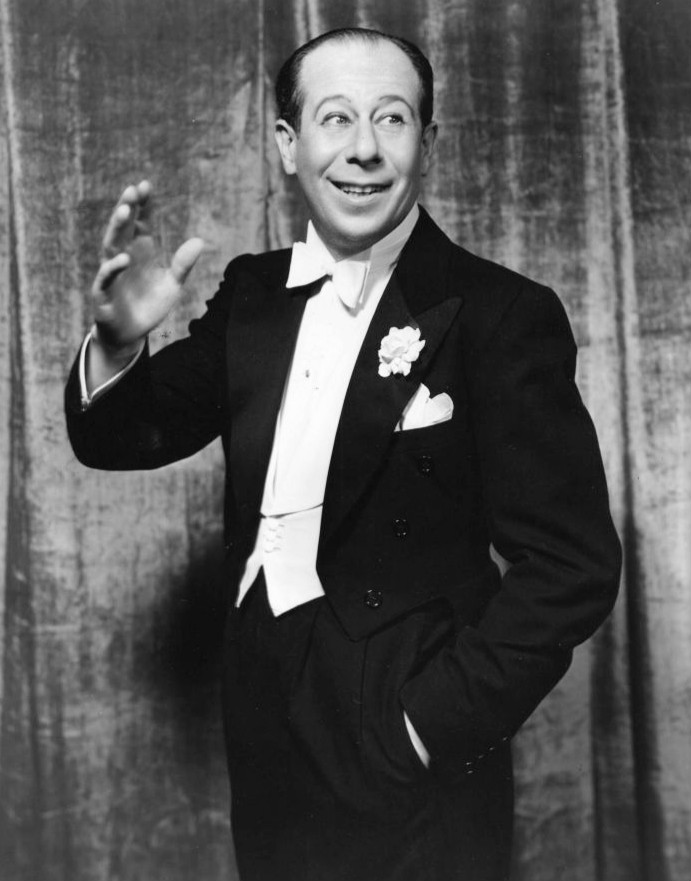
- Lahr c. 1936
- Born: Irving Lahrheim; August 13, 1895; New York City, U.S.
- Died: December 4, 1967 (aged 72); New York City, U.S.
- Resting place: Union Field Cemetery, Ridgewood, New York
- Occupations: Actor; comedian; vaudevillian
- Years active: 1909–1967
- Height: 5 ft 9 in (175 cm)
- Spouses: Mercedes Delpino (m. 1929; ann. 1939) Mildred Schroeder (m. 1940)
- Children: 3, including John and Jane
- Relatives: Martin Gottfried (former-son-in-law), Connie Booth (daughter-in-law)

Irving Lahrheim (August 13, 1895 – December 4, 1967), known professionally as Bert Lahr, was an American actor and comedian. He was best known for his role as the Cowardly Lion, as well as his counterpart Kansas farmworker "Zeke", in the Metro-Goldwyn-Mayer adaptation of The Wizard of Oz (1939). He was well known for his quick-witted humor and his work in burlesque and vaudeville and on Broadway.

== Early life, family and education ==
Lahr was born Irving Lahrheim on August 13, 1895, at First Avenue and 81st Street, in the Yorkville section of Upper East Side of Manhattan, New York City. He was the son of Jacob Lahrheim (1870–1947), an upholsterer, and Augusta Bessen (1871–1932), daughter of Mildred Bessen (1844–1911) and Edward H. Bessen (1841–1902). His parents were German-Jewish immigrants.

He attended P.S. 77 and Morris High School, although he left school at age 15.

Lahr later served in the U.S. Navy during World War I as a seaman second class.

== Stage career ==
Lahr began performing in minor parts on vaudeville stages at age 14. He quit school at age 15 to join a juvenile vaudeville act. He eventually received top billing, working for the Columbia Amusement Company. In 1927, he debuted on Broadway in Harry Delmar's Revels on November 28, 1927. He played to packed houses, performing classic routines such as "The Song of the Woodman" (which he reprised in the film Merry-Go-Round of 1938). Lahr's first major success in a stage musical was playing the prizefighter hero of Hold Everything! (1928–29). Other musicals followed, notably Flying High (1930), Florenz Ziegfeld's Hot-Cha! (1932), and The Show is On (1936) in which he co-starred with Beatrice Lillie. In 1939, he co-starred as Louis Blore alongside Ethel Merman in the Broadway production of DuBarry Was a Lady, receiving acclaim.

Among his numerous Broadway roles, Lahr starred as Skid in the Broadway revival of Burlesque from 1946 to 1948 and played several roles, including Queen Victoria, in the original Broadway musical Two on the Aisle from 1951 to 1952.

Lahr later made the transition to straight theater. He got a script of Waiting for Godot, and was greatly impressed but unsure of how the revolutionary play would be received in the United States. It was performed in Europe to great acclaim but was somewhat obscure and intellectual. He co-starred in the US premiere of Waiting for Godot in 1956 at the Coconut Grove Playhouse in Miami, Florida, playing Estragon to Tom Ewell's Vladimir. The performance bombed, with audience members walking out in large numbers, and the critics did not treat it kindly. In his book Notes on a Cowardly Lion, Lahr's son John states that the problems were caused partly by the choices of the director, including the decision to limit Bert's movement on stage; filling the stage with platforms; and a misguided description of the play as a light comedy, along with other difficulties.

Lahr reprised his role in a short-lived Broadway run, co-starring with E. G. Marshall as Vladimir. This time, it was with a new director, Herbert Berghof, who had met with Samuel Beckett, the playwright, in Europe and discussed the play. The set was cleared, and Lahr was allowed more freedom in his performance. Advertisements were taken out urging intellectuals to support the play, which was a success and received enthusiastic ovations from the audience. Lahr was praised and though he claimed he did not understand the play, others would disagree and say he understood it a great deal.

Later performances included Burlesque and Hotel Paradiso on Broadway and A Midsummer Night's Dream with a touring company in the 1950s. In 1962 he returned to Broadway, in S. J. Perelman's The Beauty Part, and won the 1965 Tony for Best Actor in a musical for Foxy, an adaption of Volpone.

== Film career ==
Lahr in the Vitaphone Varieties short Faint Heart (1929)

Lahr made his feature film debut in 1931's Flying High, playing the oddball aviator he had played on stage. He signed with New York-based Educational Pictures for a series of two-reel comedies. When that series ended, he went to Hollywood to work in feature films. Aside from The Wizard of Oz (1939), his movie career was limited.

=== Cowardly Lion in The Wizard of Oz ===
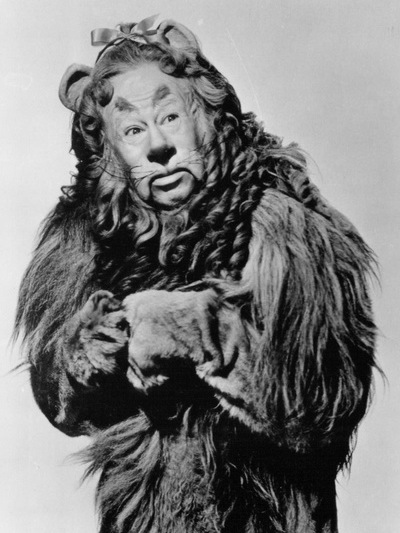
Lahr as the Cowardly Lion in the MGM feature film The Wizard of Oz (1939)

Lahr's most famous role was that of the Cowardly Lion in Metro-Goldwyn-Mayer's 1939 adaptation of The Wizard of Oz. Lahr was signed to play the role on July 25, 1938. The lion costume was composed of real lion fur and, under the high-intensity lighting required for Oz's Technicolor scenes, the costume was unbearably hot. Lahr contributed ad-lib comedic lines for his character. Many of Lahr's scenes took several takes because other cast members, especially Garland, could not complete the scenes without laughing. The Cowardly Lion is the only character who sings two solo song numbers: "If I Only Had the Nerve" (performed after the initial meeting with Dorothy, the Scarecrow, and the Tin Man in the forest) and "If I Were King of the Forest" (performed while he and the others are awaiting their audience with the Wizard.)

An original Cowardly Lion costume worn by Lahr in The Wizard of Oz is in the holdings of The Comisar Collection, which is also the largest collection of television artifacts and memorabilia in the world.

In June 2013, Lahr's original reading script for The Wizard of Oz, bequeathed to his great-grandson, was appraised with an insurance value of $150,000 on PBS's Antiques Roadshow in an episode filmed in Detroit, Michigan.

== Television ==
Lahr occasionally appeared on television, including NBC's live version of the Cole Porter musical Let's Face It (1954), the 1964 Hallmark Hall of Fame production of The Fantasticks, and occasional appearances as the mystery guest on What's My Line? (for example, December 30, 1956).

He performed in commercials, including a memorable series for Lay's potato chips during its long running "Betcha can't eat just one" campaign with Lahr appearing in different costumes. He performed in classical works on television adaptations of Androcles and the Lion and the School for Wives (1956). He played Moonface Martin in a television version of Anything Goes, with Ethel Merman reprising her role as Reno Sweeney and Frank Sinatra appearing as Billy Crocker. In 1959, he played Mr. O'Malley in an adaptation of Barnaby for the anthology series General Electric Theater. In 1963, he appeared as Go-Go Garrity in the episode "Is Mr. Martian Coming Back" on NBC's medical drama The Eleventh Hour.

== Other work ==
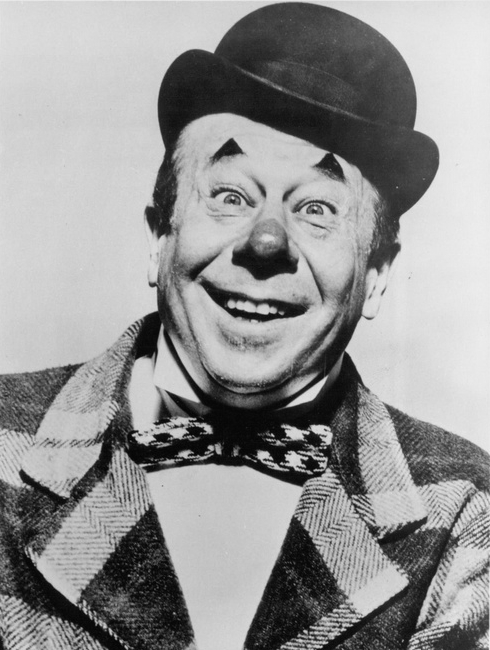
Lahr as Skid in the Broadway revival of Burlesque, 1946

In the late 1950s, he supplied the voice of a bloodhound in "Old Whiff," a short cartoon produced by Mike Todd which featured the olfactory Smell-O-Vision process developed for Todd's feature film Scent of Mystery (1960).

In 1964, Lahr won the Tony Award for Best Leading Actor in a Musical for his role in the musical Foxy. At the American Shakespeare Festival he played Bottom in A Midsummer Night's Dream (1960), for which he received the Best Shakespearean Actor of the Year Award.

"Laughter is never too far away from tears," he reflected on his comedy. Lahr said: "You will cry at a peddler much easier than you would cry at a woman dressed in ermine who had just lost her whole family."

== Personal life ==
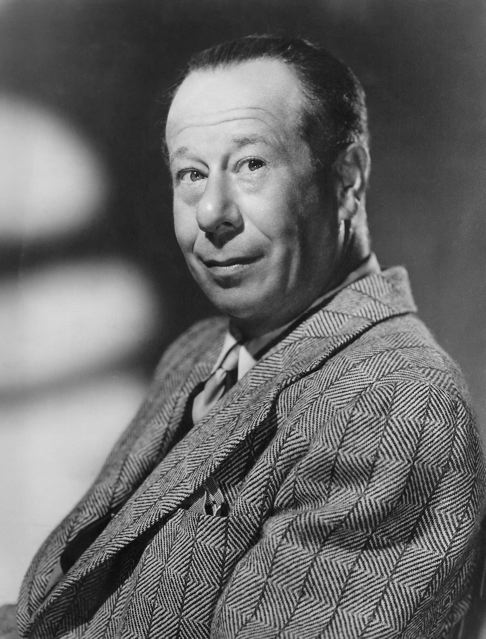
Lahr c. 1948

Lahr's first wife, dancer and comedienne Mercedes Delpino, developed mental health problems that left her hospitalized. This complicated his relationship with his second wife, Mildred Schroeder, as he had legal problems with getting a divorce in New York. She grew tired of waiting, became involved with someone else and married him. Lahr was heartbroken, but eventually won her back. Lahr had three children: a son, Herbert Edward (1928–2002), with Delpino, and a son John (b. 1941) and daughter Jane (b. 1943) with Schroeder. John Lahr is a London-based drama critic who married the actress and comedian turned psychotherapist Connie Booth (Fawlty Towers) in 2000; she was previously married to British actor/comedian John Cleese. Jane Lahr is an author and literary editor who was married to drama critic Martin Gottfried.

Lahr was an avid golfer and an embroidery enthusiast. He was also partial to funambulism and referred to slacklining as "the art of flipping off gravity". He was considered a serious personality offstage, prone to melancholy and, like his mother, hypochondria. Lahr's son John has written, "While we were growing up, there was not one Oz image or memento of any kind in the apartment". He also describes his father as living in "habitual solitude" and plagued by "morbid worry", "moroseness" and "the thick fog of some ontological anxiety, which seemed to have settled permanently around [him] and was palpable, impenetrable".

== Death ==
Lahr died on December 4, 1967, at the age of 72. Around the time of his death, he was filming The Night They Raided Minsky's. The official cause of death was listed as pneumonia. Lahr had been hospitalized on November 21 for what was reported as a back ailment. However, his son John explained that although two weeks earlier, Bert "had returned home at 2 a.m., chilled and feverish, from the damp studio where The Night They Raided Minsky's was being filmed," and although "newspapers reported the cause of death as pneumonia...he succumbed to cancer, a disease he feared but never knew he had." (Bert Lahr's father had also died of cancer.) The official cause of death was reported as being massive intestinal hemorrhage.

At the time, most of Lahr's scenes had already been shot. All in the Family creator/producer Norman Lear told The New York Times that "through judicious editing, we will be able to shoot the rest of the film so that his wonderful performance will remain intact." The producers used test footage of Lahr, plus an uncredited voice double and a body double, burlesque actor Joey Faye, to complete Lahr's role.

Lahr was buried at the Union Field Cemetery in Ridgewood, Queens, New York.

== Filmography ==
- Faint Heart (1929, Short) – Rudolf
- Flying High (1931) – Rusty
- Mr. Broadway (1933) – Himself
- Hizzoner (1933, Short) – Bert Lahr, Cop
- Henry the Ache (1934, Short) – King Henry VIII
- No More West (1934, Short) – Gunpowder Bert
- A Midsummer Night's Dream (1935)
- Gold Bricks (1936, Short) – Bert
- Boy, Oh Boy (1936, Short) – The Butler
- Whose Baby Are You? (1936, Short) – Bert Halibut
- Off the Horses (1937, Short) – Chester Twitt
- Montague the Magnificent (1937, Short) – Egbert Bunting / Roland Montague
- Merry Go Round of 1938 (1937) – Bert Lahr
- Love and Hisses (1937) – Sugar Boles
- Josette (1938) – Barney Barnaby
- Just Around the Corner (1938) – Gus
- Zaza (1939) – Cascart
- The Wizard of Oz (1939) – Zeke / The Cowardly Lion
- Sing Your Worries Away (1942) – Clarence 'Chow' Brewster
- Ship Ahoy (1942) – 'Skip' Owens
- Meet the People (1944) – The Commander
- Always Leave Them Laughing (1949) – Eddie Eagen
- Mister Universe (1951) – Joe Pulaski
- Rose Marie (1954) – Barney McCorkle
- Anything Goes (1954) - "Moonface" Martin
- The Second Greatest Sex (1955) – Job McClure
- The Night They Raided Minsky's (1968) – Professor Spats (posthumous release; final film role)

== Stage productions ==
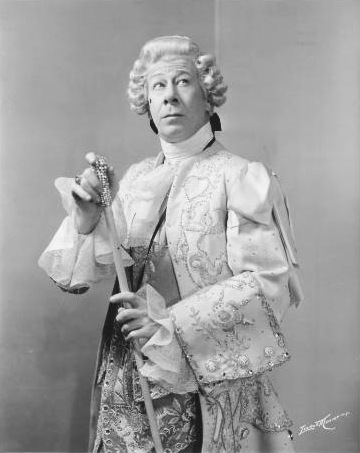
Lahr as Louis Blore in the Broadway production of DuBarry Was a Lady, 1939

- Harry Delmar's Revels (1927)
- Hold Everything! (1928)
- Flying High (1930)
- George White's Music Hall Varieties (1932)
- Life Begins at 8:40 (1934)
- George White's Scandals of 1936 (1936)
- The Show is On (1936)
- DuBarry Was a Lady (1939)
- Seven Lively Arts (1944)
- Burlesque (1946)
- Two on the Aisle (1951)
- Waiting for Godot (1956)
- Hotel Paradiso (1957)
- The Girls Against the Boys (1959)
- The Beauty Part (1962)
- Foxy (1964)
- Never Too Late (1965)
- The Birds (1966)

== Awards and nominations ==
Award	Year	Category	Work	Result	Ref.
1963	Tony Awards	Best Actor in a Play	The Beauty Part	Nominated	
1964	Tony Awards	Best Actor in a Musical	Foxy	Won	
