= 1971 Academy Awards =

1971 Academy Awards may refer to:

- 43rd Academy Awards, the Academy Awards ceremony that took place in 1971
- 44th Academy Awards, the 1972 ceremony honoring the best in film for 1971
