= Gunsmoke Ranch =

1937 film by Joseph Kane

- Directed by: Joseph Kane
- Written by: William Colt MacDonald (idea); Oliver Drake (story and screenplay) and Jack Natteford (story)
- Produced by: Sol C. Siegel
- Cinematography: Gus Peterson
- Production company: Republic Pictures
- Distributed by: Republic Pictures
- Release date: May 5, 1937
- Running time: 53 minutes
- Country: United States
- Language: English
- Budget: $35,000 (estimated)

Gunsmoke Ranch is a 1937 American Western "Three Mesquiteers" B-movie directed by Joseph Kane.

== Cast ==
- Robert Livingston as Stony Brooke
- Ray "Crash" Corrigan as Tucson Smith
- Max Terhune as Lullaby Joslin
- Kenneth Harlan as Phineas T. Flagg
- Jean Carmen as Marion Warren
- Sammy McKim as Jimmy Warren
- Ed 'Oscar' Platt as Oscar (as Oscar)
- Lou Fulton as Elmer Twiddlebaum
- Burr Caruth as Judge Jonathan Warren
- Allen Connor as Henchman Reggie Allen
- Yakima Canutt as Henchman Spider
- Horace B. Carpenter as Joe Larkin
- Jane Keckley as Mathilda Larkin
- Robert D. Walker as Seth Williams (as Robert Walker)
- Jack Ingram as Cowhand Jed
- Jack Kirk as Sheriff
- Loren Riebe as Henchman Hank
- Vinegar Roan as Henchman Zeke
- Wes Warner as Settler
- Jack Padjan as Henchman Charles 'Duke' Madden

== Soundtrack ==
- Ranchers on the bus - "I Wandered Today to the Hills, Maggie"
- Max Terhune - "Oh! Susanna"(Written by Stephen Foster)
- Robert Livingston - "When the Campfire is Low on the Prairie" (Written by Oliver Drake)
