= Only 38 =

1923 film by William C. deMille

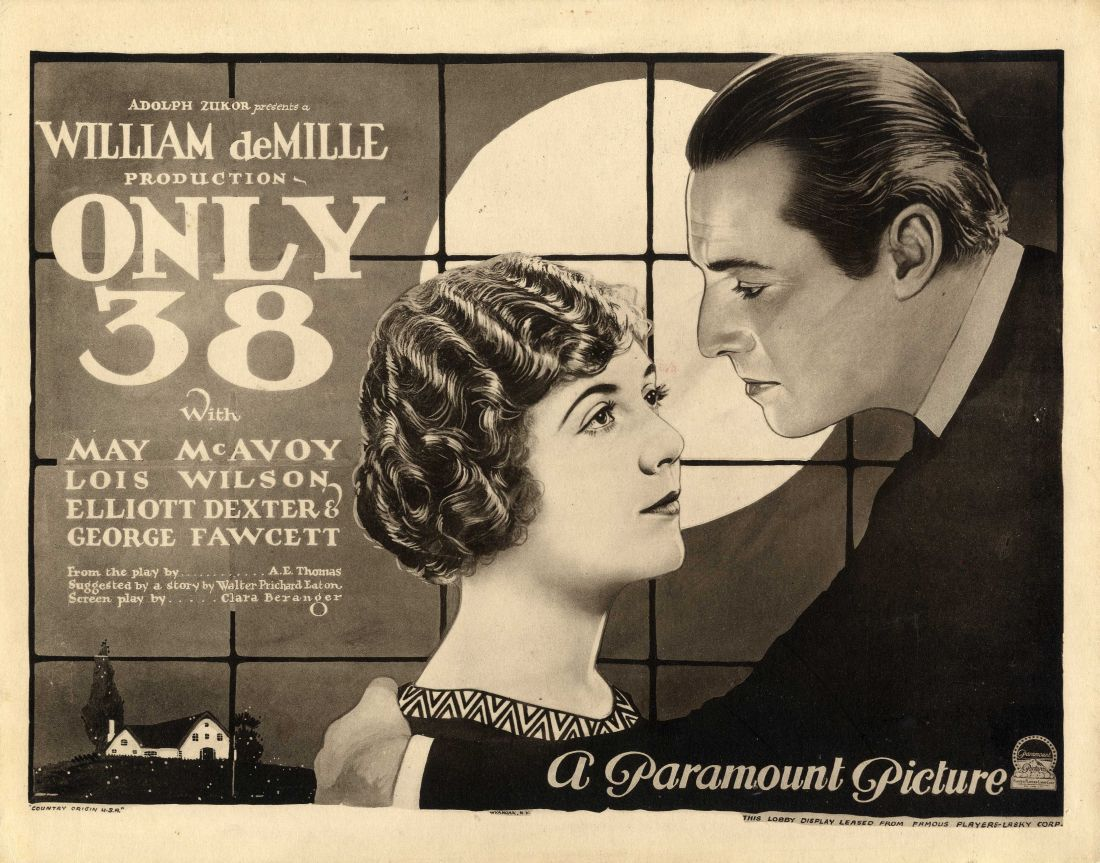
- Lobby card
- Directed by: William C. deMille
- Screenplay by: Clara Beranger; Walter Prichard Eaton; A.E. Thomas
- Produced by: Adolph Zukor
- Starring: May McAvoy; Lois Wilson; Elliott Dexter; George Fawcett; Robert Agnew; Jane Keckley
- Cinematography: L. Guy Wilky
- Production company: Famous Players–Lasky Corporation
- Distributed by: Paramount Pictures
- Release date: June 17, 1923
- Running time: 70 minutes
- Country: United States
- Languages: Silent film (English intertitles)

Only 38 is a 1923 American drama silent film directed by William C. deMille and written by Clara Beranger, Walter Prichard Eaton and A.E. Thomas. The film stars May McAvoy, Lois Wilson, Elliott Dexter, George Fawcett, Robert Agnew and Jane Keckley. The film was released on June 17, 1923, by Paramount Pictures.

== Cast ==
- May McAvoy as Lucy Stanley
- Lois Wilson as Mrs. Stanley
- Elliott Dexter as Professor Charles Giddings
- George Fawcett as Hiram Sanborn
- Robert Agnew as Bob Stanley
- Jane Keckley as Mrs. Newcomb
- Lillian Leighton as Mrs. Peters
- Taylor Graves as Sydney Johnson
- Anne Cornwall as Mary Hedley

== Preservation ==
With no prints of Only 38 located in any film archives, it is considered a lost film.
