= Arizona Gunfighter =

1937 film by Sam Newfield

- Theatrical release poster
- Directed by: Sam Newfield
- Screenplay by: George H. Plympton
- Story by: Harry F. Olmsted
- Produced by: A.W. Hackel
- Starring: Bob Steele; Jean Carmen; Ted Adams
- Cinematography: Robert E. Cline
- Edited by: S. Roy Luby
- Music by: Lee Zahler
- Production company: Supreme Pictures
- Distributed by: Republic Pictures
- Release date: September 24, 1937
- Running time: 58 minutes
- Country: United States
- Language: English

Arizona Gunfighter is a 1937 American Western film directed by Sam Newfield and starring Bob Steele, Jean Carmen and Ted Adams. It was produced and distributed by Republic Pictures.

== Plot ==
Colt Ferron (Bob Steele) and his cowhand plan a horse race only to stopped by Farley (John Merton) Durkin's henchman. Colt rides home and finds his father murdered by Durkin (Karl Hackett). Colt kills Durkin and Farley in a fair fight. Colt rides off, collapses and is found by outlaw Wolf Whitson (Ted Adams) who is actually Pop Whittaker a rancher. Colt joins Wolf's outlaw gang for two years. Wolf disbands the gang and He and Colt ride to his ranch. Pop deeds the ranch to Colt and rides off. Colt meets his neighbor Beth Lorimer (Jean Carmen) and her uncle Dan (Frank Ball). Colt learns that Wolf may be back to outlawing and together with the town sheriff (Steve Clark) and posse shoot it out with the gang. Afterward, Grizzly (Ernie Adams) hands Colt a note to visit Wolf in jail. Wolf tells Colt that it was he who killed Durkin and Farley. Colt tells governor Gray ( A.C. Henderson) that was he who shot Durkin and Farley because they murdered his father. The governor finally agrees to let Colt and Wolf go after the bandits. Together with the sheriff they find the gang has kidnapped Beth who turns out to be Wolf's daughter. They find the gang and Colt knocks Snake (Lew Meeham ) out cold. Snake comes to and draws his pistol but Grizzly arrives and shoots him. Back in the sheriff's office Colt, Wolf and Grizzly confess to being the Arizona Gunfighter. The sheriff tells Wolf and grizzly to step outside, "I still got a couple of charges." Laughter is heard while Colt and Beth embrace.

== Cast ==
- Bob Steele as Colt Ferron ("The Arizona Gunfighter")
- Jean Carmen as Beth Lorimer
- Ted Adams as Wolf Whitson / Pop Whittaker
- Ernie Adams as Grizzly Barr
- Lew Meehan as Snake Bralt
- Steve Clark as Sheriff
- John Merton as Farley (Durkin Henchman)
- Karl Hackett as Rancher Durkin
- A.C. Henderson as Governor Gray
- Frank Ball as Dan Lorimer

== See also ==
- Bob Steele filmography
