= Crashing Through (film) =

1928 film

- Directed by: Tom Buckingham
- Written by: Wyndham Gittens; Jack Stevens
- Starring: Jack Padjan; Sally Rand; Tom Santschi
- Cinematography: M.A. Andersen; Harry Davis
- Production company: Liberty Pictures
- Distributed by: Pathé Exchange
- Release date: February 5, 1928
- Running time: 50 minutes
- Country: United States
- Languages: Silent; English intertitles

Crashing Through is a 1928 American silent Western film directed by Tom Buckingham and starring Jack Padjan, Sally Rand, and Tom Santschi.

== Cast ==
- Jack Padjan as Tex Belden
- Sally Rand as Rita Bayne
- William Eugene as Jim Bayne
- Buster Gardner as Slim
- Tom Santschi as Bart Ramy
- Duke R. Lee as Sheriff

== Preservation ==
With no holdings located in archives, Crashing Through is considered a lost film.
