= Sweet Lavender (1920 film) =

1920 film

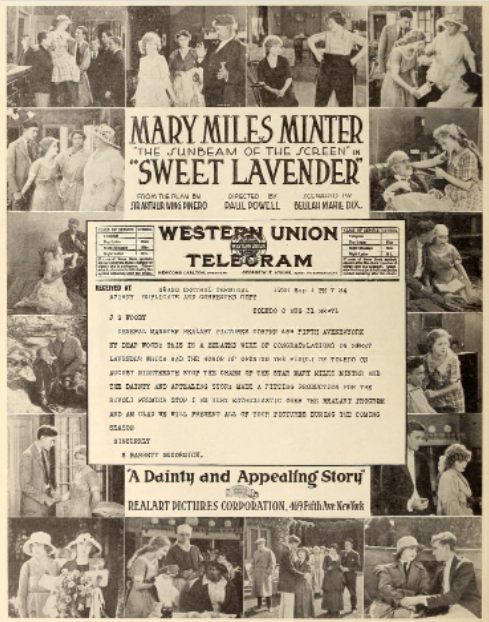
- Advertisement
- Directed by: Paul Powell
- Screenplay by: Beulah Marie Dix
- Based on: Sweet Lavender by Arthur Wing Pinero
- Starring: Mary Miles Minter; Milton Sills; Harold Goodwin; Jane Keckley
- Cinematography: William Marshall
- Production company: Realart Pictures Corporation
- Distributed by: Realart Pictures Corporation
- Release date: October 1920
- Running time: 5 reels
- Country: United States
- Language: Silent (English intertitles)

Sweet Lavender is a 1920 American silent drama film directed by Paul Powell and starring Mary Miles Minter. The scenario was adapted by Beulah Marie Dix from the 1888 play of the same name by Arthur Wing Pinero. Like many of Minter's features, it is thought to be a lost film.

== Plot ==
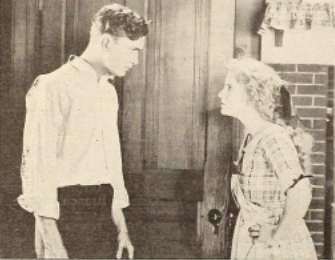
Mary Miles Minter in a scene from "Sweet Lavender" (1920)

As described in various film magazine reviews, Lavender lives with her aunt Ruth Holt, who runs a boarding house for college boys. Lavender believes that Ruth is her mother; she does not know that her real mother died in childbirth after her husband cast her out for her lower social status.

Among the boys at Ruth's boarding house is a freshman called Clem Hale. Some sophomores play a prank on him, tying him to a chair when he is supposed to be giving a speech at a dinner. Lavender deceives the sophomores and rescues Clem from his plight, and a romance develops between them.

Clem's guardian, Horace Weatherburn, pays his charge a visit, and, thinking Lavender to be beneath Clem's status, objects vehemently to the relationship. Lavender's aunt Ruth also objects, but for very different reasons; she recognises Weatherburn as her sister's cruel husband, and thus Lavender's father. Lavender is sent off to boarding school and away from Clem.

Lavender escapes from boarding school when she hears that Clem is seriously ill. Disguising herself in boys' clothes, she walks through the rain until she is overcome with exhaustion and faints. Weatherburn finds her, and recognises her from Clem's engagement ring, which she still wears. Impressed by Lavender's devotion to Clem at the expense of her own safety, he takes her to him. Mrs. Holt tells Weatherburn the truth - that Lavender is really his daughter - and all objections to her union with Clem are overcome.

The September 4th, 1920 edition of Motion Picture News lists a musical cue sheet for the film.

== Cast ==
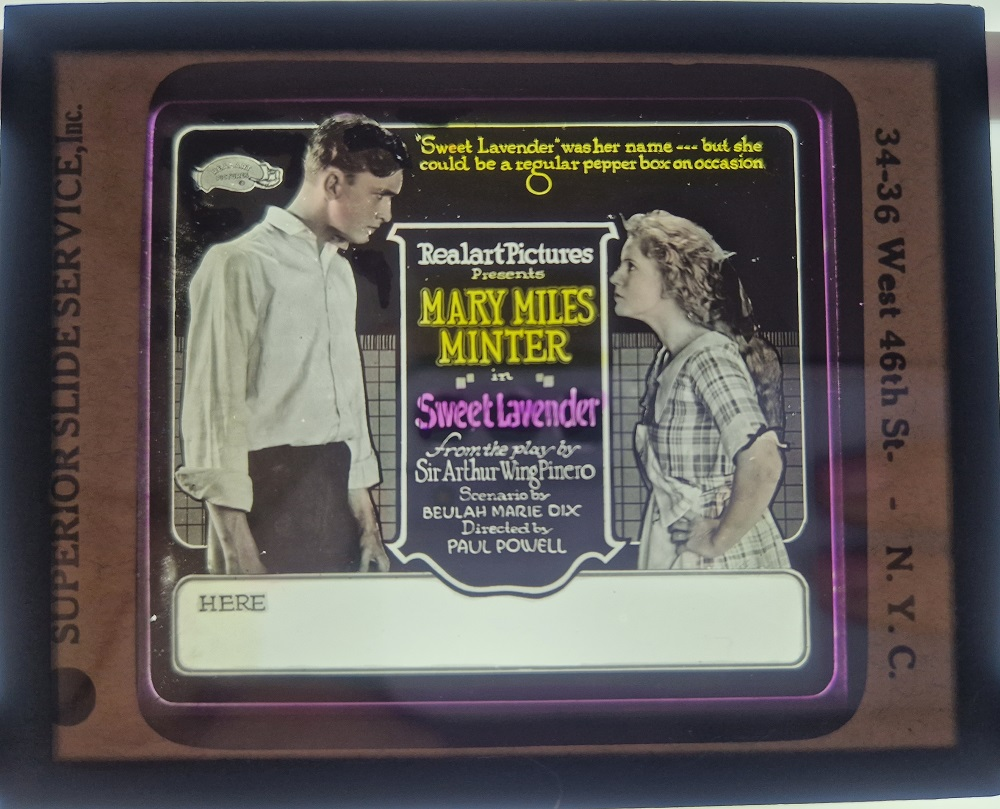
Lantern Slide for "Sweet Lavender"

- Mary Miles Minter as Lavender
- Harold Goodwin as Clem Hale
- Milton Sills as Horace Weatherburn
- Jane Keckley as Ruth Holt
- Theodore Roberts as Professor Phenyl
- Sylvia Ashton as Dotty Driscoe
- J.M. Dumont as Mr. Driscoe
- Starke Patteson as Billy Driscoe
- Flora Hollister as Minnie
