= Jean Carmen =

American actress (1913–1993)

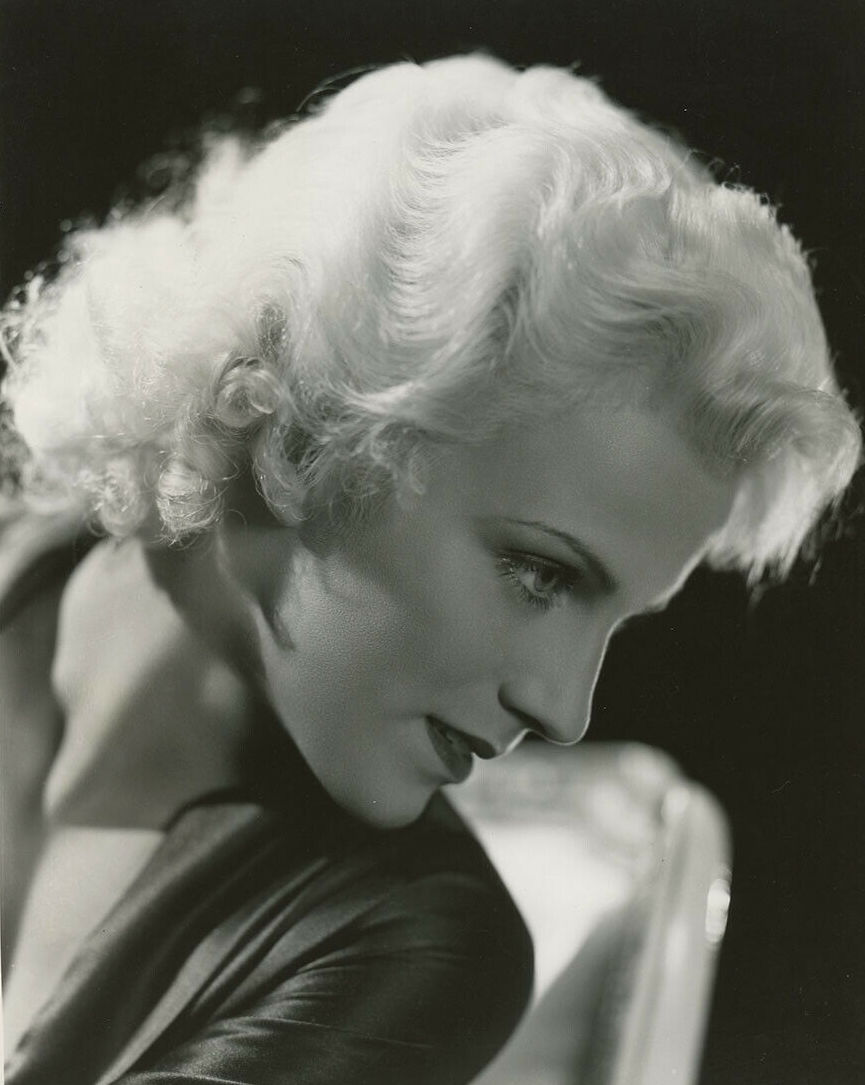
- Carmen in 1934
- Born: Jean Carmean; April 7, 1913; Portland, Oregon, U.S.
- Died: August 26, 1993 (aged 80); Charleston, South Carolina, U.S.
- Other names: Julia Thayer; Jean Carmen Dillow
- Occupations: Actress, director, writer
- Spouse(s): Walter Lohman (1932 - 19??); Barrett Collyer Dillow (c. 1949 - c. 1959/1960); divorced
- Children: 1

Jean Carmen (born Jean Carmean; April 7, 1913 – August 26, 1993) was an American film, stage, and radio actress. She sometimes went by the stage name Julia Thayer. In addition to her appearances in various films throughout the 1930s, Carmen starred on Broadway in the original production of The Man Who Came to Dinner, appearing as a replacement for the role of June Stanley. In her later career, Carmen wrote, directed, and produced the film The Pawn in 1966.

== Biography ==
Born in Portland, Oregon on April 7, 1913, to John and Agnes Carmean, she had two siblings. Jean Carmen (she altered her surname) was selected as one of the WAMPAS Baby Stars in 1934, the last year they were named. She had a supporting role as The Rider in the 1937 Republic Pictures Western serial The Painted Stallion. She also worked in radio and on Broadway, in Stage Door and the original 1939 production of The Man Who Came to Dinner (as a replacement for the role of June Stanley). She was one of three gold diggers in the 1938 Three Stooges comedy, Healthy, Wealthy and Dumb.

=== Marriages ===
Her first marriage was in 1932, at age 19, to insurance broker Walter Lohman, who was more than two decades her senior. Newspapers and the August 14, 1932 marriage license indicate their wedding ceremony was at the beach home of Constance Talmadge in Santa Monica, California. She filed for divorce in 1937. She married, secondly, to Barrett Collyfer Dillow, around 1949, whose family headed the B.F. Goodrich Company. They had a son, Guy (1951-1985), before divorcing around 1959 or 1960. Guy H. Dillow, nicknamed "Buz" or "Buzzie", was born in 1951 and died in 1985. Guy was featured in Jean's movie The Pawn, an early 1960s film shot in the U.S. and Italy. Guy died in 1985, after which his mother sold her Greenwich, Connecticut home and re-located to Charleston, South Carolina.

=== Writing credits ===
In 1945, Jean and Irish Owen authored the comedy Last House on the Left and there was a pre-Broadway tryout in Hartford, Connecticut. The leads were Jean and Gene Barry. The play was not successful and never made it to New York. In 1966, Carmen wrote, directed, and produced the film The Pawn, credited as Jean Carmen Dillow. During this time, she resided in Greenwich, Connecticut. Her son starred in the film.

== Death ==
Carmen died on August 26, 1993, in Charleston, South Carolina, aged 80.

== Filmography ==
Year	Title	Role	Notes	Ref.
1933	Midshipman Jack	Gloria's Blonde Girlfriend		
1934	Hips, Hips, Hooray!	Blonde	Uncredited	
1934	Kiss and Make-Up	Maharajah's Wife		
1934	Young and Beautiful	WAMPAS Baby Star		
1934	The Third Sex	Bobby Allen		
1935	Born to Battle	Betty Powell		
1936	Wolves of the Sea	Nadine Miller		
1937	Bill Cracks Down	Girl	Uncredited	
1937	Gunsmoke Ranch	Marion Warren	As Julia Thayer	
1937	The Painted Stallion	The Rider	As Julia Thayer	
1937	Arizona Gunfighter	Beth Lorimer		
1937	Million Dollar Racket	Jessie		
1938	Healthy, Wealthy and Dumb	Marge	Short film	
1938	Paroled from the Big House	Pat Mallory		
1938	Sunset Murder Case	Chorus Girl	Uncredited	
1939	Four Girls in White	Nurse	Uncredited	
1939	In Old Montana	June Allison		
1939	Smoky Trails	Marie		
1939	Yes, We Have No Bonanza	Singing Sister	Uncredited	
1939	Crashing Thru	Ann "Angel" Chambers		
1953	Here Come the Girls	Missouri Chorine	Uncredited	
1968	The Pawn	—N/a	Director, producer, and writer	

== Stage credits ==
Year	Title	Role	Notes	Ref.
1939–1941	The Man Who Came to Dinner	June Stanley	Music Box Theatre	
