= Eccentric-hub scooter =

An eccentric-hub scooter is a two-wheeled human powered vehicle with an off centered hub on the large rear wheel. The scooter is powered by the rider making a bouncing motion on the platform.

== Description ==
An eccentric hub scooter

An eccentric-hub scooter is similar to a kick scooter, but with a large rear wheel, mounted off-centre. It is propelled by the user bouncing up and down or rocking backwards and forwards on the platform to drive the rear wheel around the eccentric hub. One early inventor described the vehicle as a 'galloping scooter' and the rider's motion does resemble a horse-rider's motion. Although the motion produced is impact-free, it is reportedly less efficient than a conventional bicycle and will not propel the vehicle uphill.

== History ==
=== Exercycle / Ingo-Bike ===
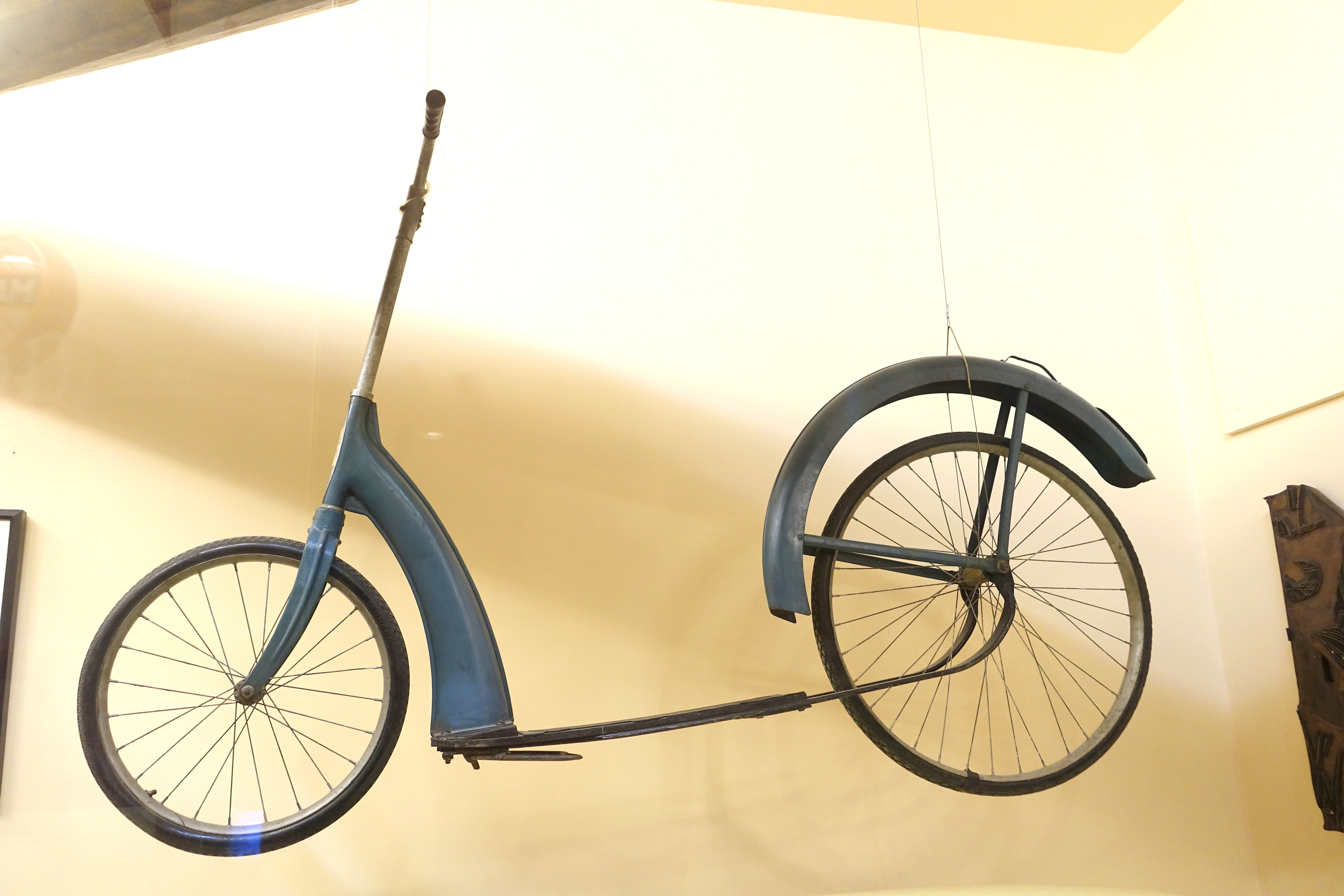
Ingo-bike

Although several patents for eccentric-hub cycles exist from 1928, the most popular incarnation was patented in 1934 by brothers Phillip and Prescott Huyssen and called the "Exercycle". It was produced by the Ingersoll Steel & Disc Co. (a division of Borg-Warner Corp.), from 1934 to 1937, under the name "Ingo-bike". A large number of publicity events and promotions popularised the bike and a group of Ingo-bikers in the late 1930s traveled from Chicago to Miami in 30 days. Production ceased when the factory re-tooled to begin producing armaments prior to the Second World War. Phillip Huyssen continued designing variations until at least the 1970s. In the Three Stooges movie Yes, We Have No Bonanza, Curly rides up to a saloon bar on an Ingo-Bike.

=== Kangaroo Scooter ===
Apparently re-introduced as a children's scooter in the 1960s with the name "kangaroo scooter", kangaroo scooters were built in Taiwan for a company based in Concord, California. They had the eccentric rear wheel and a front caliper brake, chrome fenders, and a kickstand.

Another device, also called the Kangaroo Scooter, has been designed and sold by Ron and Johnny Knox's company, Knoxcooter Inc., of Weyburn, Canada since 2004. This variant includes a one-sided rear wheel support, disk brakes and uniquely a clutched rear hub; which allows the user to coast for periods without bouncing up and down. Contrary to popular belief, the Eco-Fav (Frequency Accelerated Velocipede) scooter is efficient enough to ride uphill; many users prefer to ride it on an incline to increase their workout resistance.

=== Bounce Bike ===
A similar concept is the 'Bounce-Bike' which has an eccentric front wheel and a small rear wheel.

=== Whymcycle ===
Peter Wagner has produced variants called "whymcycles" since the 1990s. The name is derived from the word 'whimsical.' Several dozen units of various configuration have been produced.
