= Sammy McKim =

Canadian actor and artist

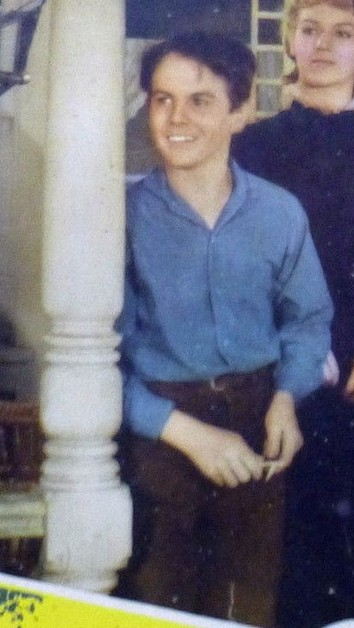
- McKim in Laddie (1940)
- Born: December 20, 1924; Vancouver, British Columbia, Canada
- Died: July 9, 2004 (aged 79); Burbank, California, U.S.
- Education: Los Angeles Art Center, Pasadena
- Occupations: Actor; Artist
- Years active: 1935–1987
- Employer: WED Enterprises (Walt Disney Imagineering)
- Children: Matt McKim, Brian McKim
- Awards: Distinguished Service Cross medal, Disney Legend, 1996

Sammy McKim (December 20, 1924 – July 9, 2004) was a Canadian film actor and artist. He graduated from Los Angeles Art Center with a Bachelor of Arts Degree and was born in Vancouver, British Columbia. He died in Burbank, California from heart failure in 2004. McKim Served in the U.S. Army in 1943 with his brother David McKim where he fought in the Korean War. He earned the Distinguished Service Cross medal for being shot down in combat during the Korean War. After the war McKim stopped acting and became an artist, starting his career at the art department of Fox Studios before moving to the Walt Disney Company where he'd stay for the next 32 years until his retirement in 1987, 12 of which he would work closely with Walt Disney.

== WED Enterprises/Walt Disney Imagineering career ==
McKim began his career at WED Enterprises in 1954 as an illustrator six months prior to the opening of Disneyland. One of his earliest illustrations being of The Golden Horseshoe in Frontierland as well as storyboards for various films and television shows such as, Nikki, Wild Dog of the North, Big Red, and Zorro. Later on he would contribute some illustrations for Great Moments with Mr. Lincoln, Walt Disney's Carousel of Progress, Pirates of the Caribbean and the Haunted Mansion. He was also responsible for the concept art of all four Disney attractions seen at the New York World's Fair 1964–1965.

By 1958 McKim became known as "master map maker" for creating the Disneyland Park souvenir maps that were sold at the park from 1958 to 1964. After retiring from Walt Disney Imagineering in 1987, McKim was brought back in 1992 to help his son Matt McKim on the Disneyland Paris project (also known as Euro Disneyland), Sam McKim created the map for the park. During the process of making the map for Euro Disneyland McKim suffered a heart attack which led him to asking Tony Baxter for a replacement on the map project which was refused by Baxter because he would have rather waited until McKim was done with the map. McKim would eventually go on to finishing the map for the park three weeks after the opening of Euro Disneyland.

== Awards and honors ==
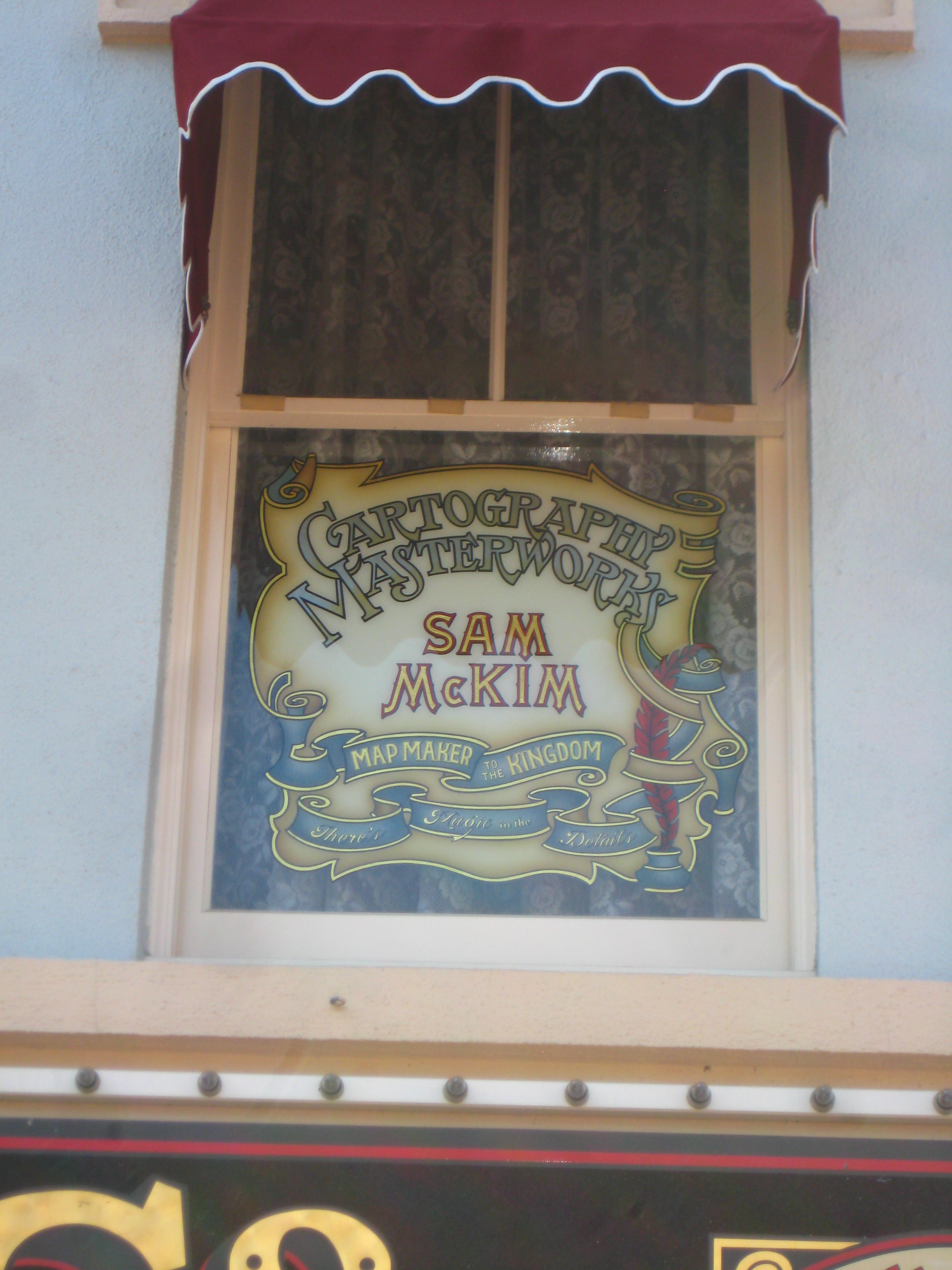
Disney Imagineer Sam McKim's dedication window on Main Street in Disneyland.

In 1996, McKim was inducted as a Disney Legend. Two years after his death, in 2006, McKim received the honor of having his name appear on Main Street, U.S.A. windows at Disneyland. The window, which can be found above the Main Street Photo Supply Co. reads: Cartography Masterworks – Sam McKim – Map Maker of the Kingdom – There's Magic in the Details.

== Filmography ==
| Year | Title | Role | Notes |
|---|---|---|---|
| 1935 | Annie Oakley | Boy at Shooting Gallery | Uncredited |
| 1936 | San Francisco | Choirboy | Uncredited |
| 1937 | Hit the Saddle | Tim Miller (Sheriff's Son) | |
| 1937 | Gunsmoke Ranch | Jimmy Warren | |
| 1937 | The Painted Stallion | Christopher Kit Carson | Serial |
| 1937 | Heart of the Rockies | Davey Dawson | |
| 1937 | It Happened in Hollywood | Boy | Uncredited |
| 1937 | The Trigger Trio | Mickey Evans | |
| 1938 | The Lone Ranger | Sammy | Serial |
| 1938 | Call the Mesquiteers | Timothy Irving | |
| 1938 | The Crowd Roars | One Punch O'Malley | Uncredited |
| 1938 | Sons of the Legion | Spec | |
| 1938 | Red River Range | Tommy Jones | |
| 1939 | Western Caravans | Matt Winters | |
| 1939 | The Night Riders | Tim Randall | |
| 1939 | New Frontier | Stevie Braddock | |
| 1939 | Dick Tracy's G-Men | Sammy Williams | Serial, Uncredited |
| 1939 | Mr. Smith Goes to Washington | Boy Ranger | Uncredited |
| 1940 | Laddie | Leon Stanton | |
| 1940 | Rocky Mountain Rangers | Danny Burke | |
| 1940 | Little Men | Tommy | |
| 1941 | Nice Girl? | Boy | Uncredited |
| 1941 | Men of Boys Town | Boys Town Sentry | Uncredited |
| 1941 | Sergeant York | Boy | Uncredited |
| 1942 | Wild Bill Hickok Rides | Boy | Uncredited |
| 1944 | The Adventures of Mark Twain | Cub Pilot | Uncredited |
| 1947 | Undercover Maisie | Trainee | Uncredited |
| 1947 | Dark Delusion | Young Townsboy | Uncredited |
| 1947 | The Hucksters | Western Union Messenger | Uncredited |
| 1949 | Flamingo Road | Hotel Bellboy | Uncredited |
| 1952 | The Story of Will Rogers | Scotty - Flier | Uncredited |
| 1953 | Battle Circus | Soldier | Uncredited |

== Bibliography ==
- Goldrup, Tom and Jim (2002). Growing Up on the Set: Interviews with 39 Former Child Actors of Film and Television. McFarland & Co. pp. 191–199. ISBN 1476613702.
- Holmstrom, John (1996). The Moving Picture Boy: An International Encyclopaedia from 1895 to 1995. Norwich: Michael Russell, p. 130.
