= The Painted Stallion =

1937 film by William Witney, Ray Taylor, Alan James

- Directed by: Alan James; Ray Taylor; William Witney
- Written by: Morgan Cox; Ronald Davidson; Hal G. Evarts; Winston Miller; Barry Shipman
- Produced by: J. Laurence Wickland
- Starring: Ray "Crash" Corrigan; Hoot Gibson; LeRoy Mason; Duncan Renaldo; Sammy McKim; Hal Taliaferro; Jack Perrin; Julia Thayer
- Cinematography: Edgar Lyons; William Nobles
- Edited by: Edward Todd; Helene Turner
- Music by: Raoul Kraushaar
- Distributed by: Republic Pictures
- Release dates: June 5, 1937 (U.S. serial); February 11, 1938 (U.S. feature)
- Running time: 12 chapters (212 minutes (serial); 67 minutes (feature); 6 26½-minute episodes (TV)
- Language: English
- Budget: $102,157 (negative cost: $109,164)

The Painted Stallion is a 1937 American Western film serial from Republic Pictures. It was the sixth Republic serial of the sixty-six made by that company. Western serials such as this made up a third of the serials from Republic, a studio that was also heavily involved in making B-Western feature films at the time.

This serial saw the directorial debut of William Witney, who would become one of the star directors at Republic. It was not until Zorro Rides Again, later in 1937, that he first worked with his famous directorial partner, John English. Witney had been working as an editor on earlier serials but made the switch when another director became unable to work due to heavy drinking.

== Plot ==
A wagon train travelling from Independence, Missouri to Santa Fe means trouble for Alfredo Dupray, his authority from Spain will end with the arrival of a Mexican Governor. He plots to solve this by intercepting a trade agreement, to be negotiated by Clark Stuart on the wagon train, and disrupt Mexico–United States relations.

Repeated attacks are thwarted, however, by the appearance of a mysterious Rider on a Painted Stallion who issues warnings with her whistling arrows. With her help Clark Stuart, along with historical characters, Kit Carson, Jim Bowie and Davy Crockett work to defeat Dupray. Eventually, they assist the arrival of the United States Cavalry and the treaty is signed, leaving Stuart and the Rider to ride away together.

== Cast ==
Main cast

- Ray "Crash" Corrigan as Clark Stuart, government official with a trade treaty to be agreed with Mexico
- Hoot Gibson as Walter Jamison, Leader of the Wagon train
- LeRoy Mason as Alfredo Dupray, Spanish dictator determined to hold onto power
- Julia Thayer as 'The Rider', a mysterious woman on a painted stallion, believed to be an Indian Spirit riding a Ghost Horse
- Duncan Renaldo as 'Zamorro', one of Dupray's henchmen
- Sammy McKim as Young Christopher 'Kit' Carson, along as part of the wagon train
- Hal Taliaferro as Jim Bowie, along as part of the wagon train
- Jack Perrin as Davy Crockett, along as part of the wagon train
- Ed "Oscar" Platt and Lou Fulton as 'Oscar and Elmer', a comedy duo with the wagon train

Supporting cast

- Yakima Canutt as 'Tom', one of Dupray's henchmen
- Matson Williams as 'Macklin', one of Dupray's henchmen undercover on the wagon train
- Duke Taylor as 'Bill', one of Dupray's henchmen
- Loren Riebe as 'Pedro', one of Dupray's henchmen
- George DeNormand as 'Oldham', one of Dupray's henchmen undercover on the wagon train
- Gordon De Main as 'Governor'
- Charles King as 'Bull Smith', one of Dupray's henchmen
- Vinegar Roan as 'Pete', one of Dupray's henchmen

== Production ==
The serial was filmed between February 10 and March 3, 1937. The serial's production number was 421. The Painted Stallion was budgeted for $102,157 but went over budget by $7007 (6.9%). The final cost of production was $109,164. This made the serial the cheapest republic serial of 1937 and the fourth cheapest of all Republic serials. Portions of the film were shot in the Coachella Valley, California.

=== Stunts ===
- Yakima Canutt as Clark Stuart & Alfredo Dupray (doubling Ray "Crash" Corrigan and LeRoy Mason)
- Babe DeFreest as The Rider (doubling Julia Thayer)
- Duke Taylor

=== Special effects ===
- The Lydecker brothers

== Release ==
=== Theatrical ===
The Painted Stallion's official release date is 5 June 1937, although this is actually the date the sixth chapter was made available to film exchanges.

A 67-minute feature film version, created by editing the serial footage together, was released on 11 February 1938. It was one of fourteen feature films Republic made from their serials.

=== Television ===
In the early 1950s, The Painted Stallion was one of fourteen Republic serials edited into a television series. It was broadcast in six 26½-minute episodes.

=== Home media ===
On December 27, 2005, a Region 0 DVD of the serial was released by Alpha Video.

== Critical reception ==
Raymond Stedman describes Thyer as quiet yet impressive and William Nobles is noted for his sweeping camera work. Raoul Krausharr's musical score is a bridge between the "synthetic fusions" of earlier sound serials and the "creative scorings" of his successors at Republic. According to Cline, The Painted Stallion is an outstanding example of the Western "Covered Wagon" (wagon train based) subgenre.

== Chapter titles ==
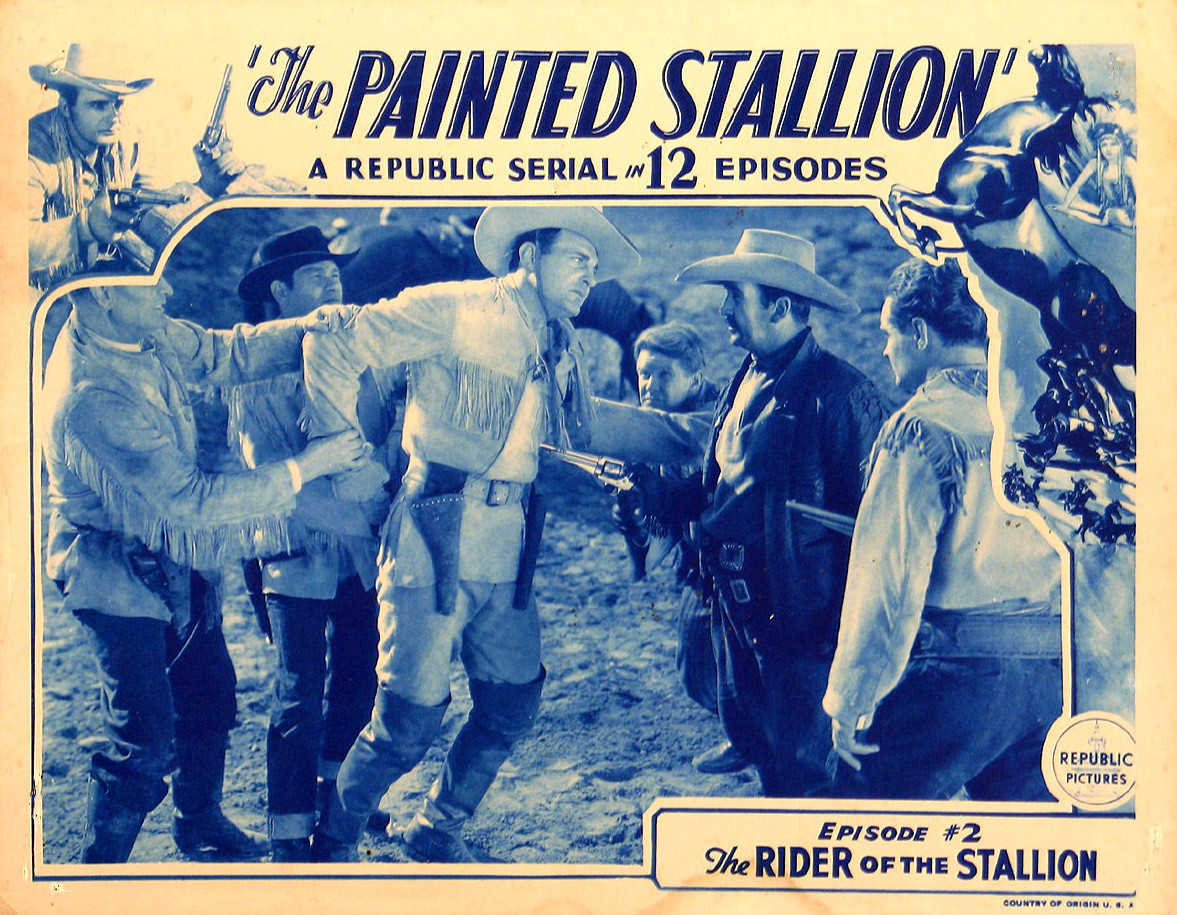
Lobby card for chapter 2

1. Trail to Empire (27 min 35s)
2. Rider of the Stallion (17 min 6s)
3. The Death Leap (18 min 05s)
4. Avalanche (17 min 14s)
5. Volley of Death (16 min 42s)
6. Thundering Wheels (17 min 45s)
7. Trail Treachery (16 min 9s)
8. The Whistling Arrow (16 min 25s)
9. The Fatal Message (16 min 24s)
10. Ambush (15 min 59s)
11. Tunnel of Terror (16 min 17s)
12. Human Targets (16 min 48s)

_{Source:}

== Cliffhangers ==
1. Trail to Empire: Clark is shot from his horse and falls under the hoofs of attacking Indians.
2. Rider of the Stallion: Clark is knocked unconscious while fording a river in a wagon, which begins to sink.
3. The Death Leap: Escaping on horseback, Clark and the Rider are chased over a cliff into a lake.
4. Avalanche: An explosion catches Clark in a landslide
5. Volley of Death: Clark hides in a cupboard but has been seen - a firing squad opens fire.
6. Thundering Wheels: Clark is in a burning wagon full of gunpowder as it falls over a cliff.
7. Trail Treachery: Attempting to reign in a runaway stagecoach, Clark falls under their hooves.
8. The Whistling Arrow: Clark falls into a trapdoor.
9. The Fatal Message: Clark and Kit are caught in a burning building.
10. Ambush: While jumping a ravine, Clark slips from the saddle and falls.
11. Tunnel of Terror: Dupray's henchmen cause a landslide to fall on Jamison and the others.

== See also ==
- Hoot Gibson filmography
- List of film serials
- List of film serials by studio
- List of films in the public domain in the United States

Preceded by Dick Tracy (1937)	Republic Serial; The Painted Stallion (1937)	Succeeded by S.O.S. Coast Guard (1937)
