= Jane Keckley =

American actress (1876-1963)

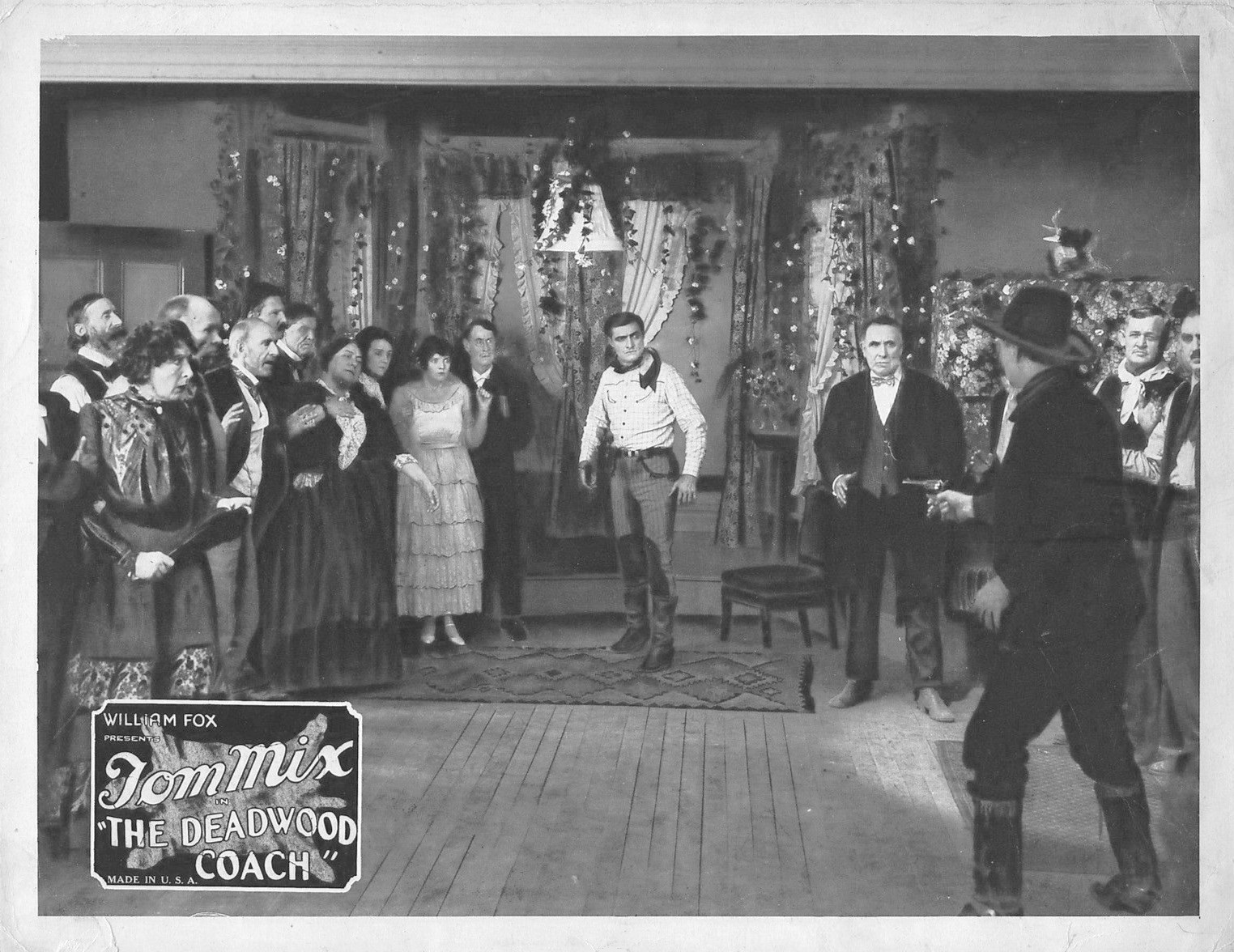
- Keckley (left) on lobby card for The Deadwood Coach (1924)
- Born: September 10, 1876; Charleston, South Carolina, U.S.
- Died: August 14, 1963 (aged 86); South Pasadena, California, U.S.
- Other name: Jane Watson
- Occupation: Actress
- Years active: 1916–1942
- Spouse: Roy Watson

Jane Keckley (September 10, 1876 – August 14, 1963) was an American actress of the silent and sound film eras.

== Biography ==
Keckley was born in Charleston, South Carolina, and went to school there and in Georgia.

Before she acted in films, Keckley performed in stock theater and in vaudeville.

Keckley began her film career in one- and two-reel Westerns in 1911. Her first feature film was 1915's The Circular Staircase (under the name Jane Watson). In her twenty-five year career, she would appear in over 90 films, as well as dozens of shorts. She would appear as a supporting actress in such films as: William Desmond Taylor's Huck and Tom (1918); the 1936 version of Show Boat, starring Irene Dunne and Allan Jones; and Magnificent Obsession (1935), starring Irene Dunne and Robert Taylor.

She was under contract to Paramount in the late 1930s and early 1940s, where she appeared in her final film, South of Santa Fe (1942), starring Roy Rogers.

Keckley was married to, and divorced from, actor Roy Watson. She died on August 14, 1963.

== Filmography ==
(Per AFI database)

- The Circular Staircase (1915)
- Redeeming Love (1916)
- The Parson of Panamint (1916)
- Molly Entangled (1917)
- Huck and Tom; or, the Further Adventures of Tom Sawyer (1918)
- A Petticoat Pilot (1918)
- Sauce for the Goose (1918)
- The Girl of My Dreams (1918)
- Children of Banishment (1919)
- The Third Kiss (1919)
- The Soul of Youth (1920)
- Sweet Lavender (1920)
- Everything for Sale (1921)
- Sacred and Profane Love (1921)
- A Virginia Courtship (1921)
- Rags to Riches (1922)
- Are You a Failure? (1923)
- Just Like a Woman (1923)
- Only 38 (1923)
- The Deadwood Coach (1924)
- Fair Week (1924)
- The Hill Billy (1924)
- The Mile-a-Minute Man (1926)
- Aflame in the Sky (1927)
- The Angel of Broadway (1927)
- The Country Doctor (1927)
- The King of Kings (1927)
- The Lady in Ermine (1927)
- Craig's Wife (1928)
- Harold Teen (1928)
- The Masked Angel (1928)
- Object: Alimony (1928)
- On to Reno (1928)
- Road House (1928)
- Walking Back (1928)
- Dynamite (1929)
- Noisy Neighbors (1929)
- The Godless Girl (1929)
- Conspiracy (1930)
- Hide-Out (1930)
- The Naughty Flirt (1931)
- Dance Hall Hostess (1933)
- Curtain at Eight (1933)
- Murder on the Campus (1933)
- One Year Later (1933)
- Notorious but Nice (1933)
- Strange People (1933)
- The World Accuses (1934)
- The Quitter (1934)
- One in a Million (1934)
- Stolen Sweets (1934)
- City Limits (1934)
- The Painted Veil (1934)
- I Give My Love (1934)
- Ruggles of Red Gap (1935)
- A Shot in the Dark (1935)
- False Pretenses (1935)
- The Tonto Kid (1935)
- Ginger (1935)
- Diamond Jim (1935)
- Show Boat (1936)
- Paddy O'Day (1936)
- The Bridge of Sighs (1936)
- Roarin' Lead (1936)
- And Sudden Death (1936)
- Tango (1936)
- Girl of the Ozarks (1936)
- Theodora Goes Wild (1936)
- Pepper (1936)
- Gentle Julia (1936)
- Magnificent Obsession (1936)
- Next Time We Love (1936)
- Laughing at Trouble (1936)
- Souls at Sea (1937)
- The Plainsman (1937)
- That I May Live (1937)
- Dangerous Holiday (1937)
- Gunsmoke Ranch (1937)
- The Buccaneer (1938)
- Road Demon (1938)
- Tom Sawyer, Detective (1938)
- Scandal Street (1938)
- Lightning Carson Rides Again (1938)
- In Old Montana (1939)
- Romance of the Redwoods (1939)
- Union Pacific (1939)
- Persons in Hiding (1939)
- The Doctor Takes a Wife (1940) (uncredited)
- Bedtime Story (1941)
- Buy Me That Town (1941)
- Dude Cowboy (1941)
- Honky Tonk (1941)
- There's Magic in Music (1941)
- Tight Shoes (1941)
- Riding the Wind (1942)
- South of Santa Fe (1942)
