= Healthy, Wealthy and Dumb =

1938 American short film by Del Lord

- Directed by: Del Lord
- Written by: Searle Kramer
- Produced by: Jules White
- Starring: Moe Howard; Larry Fine; Curly Howard; James C. Morton; Bud Jamison; Lucille Lund; Jean Carmen; Earlene Heath
- Cinematography: Allen G. Siegler
- Edited by: Charles Nelson
- Distributed by: Columbia Pictures
- Release date: May 20, 1938 (U.S.)
- Running time: 16:24
- Country: United States
- Language: English

Healthy, Wealthy and Dumb is a 1938 short subject directed by Del Lord starring American slapstick comedy team The Three Stooges (Moe Howard, Larry Fine and Curly Howard). It is the 31st entry in the series released by Columbia Pictures starring the comedians, who released 190 shorts for the studio between 1934 and 1959.

== Plot ==
After Curly wins $50,000 by crafting a memorable jingle for a radio competition, the Stooges resolve to adopt an affluent lifestyle. They relocate to the Hotel Costa Plente, where their accommodation, replete with opulent furnishings, becomes the unwitting canvas for their characteristic clumsiness, resulting in the systematic destruction of numerous expensive items.

Concurrently, three cunning young women in arrears for their rent formulate a plan to gain possession of the Stooges' fortune by masquerading as affluent widows seeking remarriage to wealthy suitors. While they prepare to implement their scheme, a registered letter is delivered to Curly informing him that exorbitant tax deductions have whittled his winnings down to $4.85. When the purported widows introduce themselves, the desperate Stooges need little prompting to accede to matrimonial arrangements. However, the facade of affluence swiftly unravels when the true financial state of the Stooges is exposed, leading to a retaliatory act wherein the gold diggers incapacitate their erstwhile suitors with champagne bottles.

== Production notes ==
The title Healthy, Wealthy and Dumb is a parody of Benjamin Franklin's proverb "early to bed, early to rise, makes a man healthy, wealthy and wise." It was remade with Shemp as A Missed Fortune (1952), with minimal stock footage.
