= Paroled from the Big House =

1938 film

- Directed by: Elmer Clifton
- Written by: George H. Plympton
- Based on: He Killed a Cop by George H. Plympton
- Produced by: J.D. Kendis
- Starring: Jean Carmen; Ted Adams; George Eldredge
- Cinematography: Edward Linden
- Edited by: Carl Pierson
- Music by: Lew Porter
- Production company: Jay-Dee-Kay Productions
- Distributed by: Syndicate Film Exchange
- Release date: July 29, 1938
- Running time: 57 minutes
- Country: United States
- Language: English

Paroled from the Big House is a 1938 American crime film directed by Elmer Clifton and starring Jean Carmen, Ted Adams and George Eldredge. It was produced as a second feature on Poverty Row. It was later reissued under the alternative title Main Street Girl.

== Plot ==
A district attorney opposes the leniency of the parole board. In particular a cop killer, 'Slicker' Nixon is released from prison and immediately sets up a new racket. Pat Mallory's father is a store owner who is killed by Nixon's gang and seeks revenge by plotting to kill the gangster.

== Cast ==
- Jean Carmen as Pat Mallory
- Ted Adams as H.S. 'Slicker' Nixon
- George Eldredge as 'Red' Herron
- Milburn Stone as Commissioner Downey
- Walter Anthony as Joe 'Killer' Britt
- Ole Olsen as Torchy
- Gwen Lee as Binnie Bell
- Earl Douglas as Huke 'The Dude' Curtis
- Eleanor DeVan as Rita
- Edward Kaye as 'Gunner' Garson
- Joe Devlin as Jed Cross
- Allan Cavan as Chief of Police
- Kit Guard as Thug

== Bibliography ==
- Pitts, Michael R. Poverty Row Studios, 1929–1940. McFarland & Company, 2005.
