= In Old Montana =

1939 film

- Theatrical poster
- Directed by: Raymond K. Johnson
- Written by: Jackson Parks; Raymond K. Johnson; Homer King Gordon; Barney Hutchinson
- Produced by: C.C. Burr
- Starring: Fred Scott; Jean Carmen; John Merton
- Cinematography: Marcel Le Picard; Harvey Gould
- Edited by: Charles Henkel Jr.
- Music by: Lee Zahler
- Production company: C.C. Burr Productions
- Distributed by: Spectrum Pictures; Equity British Films (UK)
- Release date: February 5, 1939
- Running time: 61 minutes
- Country: United States
- Language: English

In Old Montana is a 1939 American Western film directed by Raymond K. Johnson and starring Fred Scott, Jean Carmen and John Merton. It is about the conflict existing between sheepherders and cattlemen in the nineteenth century.

== Background ==
The film was "the second of four singing Westerns Scott made for C. C. Burr". It was distributed in the United Kingdom in 1940 by Equity British Films.

The film begins with a statement explaining the conflict:

When the links in the chain of States that made up the great United States were forged, there were many conflicts, dramatic and spectacular, that often threatened the prosperity of the frontier and the economic structure of the whole nation. Such was the war that broke out in Montana in 1860 between the cattle barons and the sheepherders. The cattlemen had priority and also claimed sheep polluted the land and streams, cropping the grass so short the grazing land was ruined for years. The sheepmen claimed that raising sheep was more profitable and that "the spread" was Government land and they had as much right to it as anyone else. The series of events chronicles here took place in the Lobo Valley just below the fertile grazing lands of the Powder River Basin. Although frankly a Western story, with fictitious characters, each one originally had its counterpart in fact.

== Plot ==
Fred Dawson (Scott), a serving cavalry officer, requests leave of absence to visit his father, who has been shot. His commanding officer grants the request, but asks him to carry out an investigation at the same time into the current conflict between the sheepherders and cattlemen in the area. Dawson arranges a meeting between the two factions to encourage cooperation in an attempt to resolve the dispute. During the meeting, Joe Allison (Walter Mcgrail) is shot and Dawson is framed for the shooting. He is locked up pending a trial, but his friend Doc Flanders (Harry Harvey) breaks him out. Later, Dawson and Ed Brandt (John Merton) have a fist fight, after which it emerges that Theodore Jason (Frank LaRue) has secretly been creating all the trouble for his own ends, hoping that the cattlemen and sheepherders would run out of money so that he could foreclose on their debts.

There is a subplot in which Fred Dawson forms a close relationship with June Allison (Carmen), the daughter of Joe Allison.

== Cast ==
- Fred Scott as Fred Dawson
- Jean Carmen as June Allison
- John Merton as Ed Brandt
- Harry Harvey as Doc Flanders
- Walter McGrail as Joe Allison, father of June Allison
- Wheeler Oakman as Jim Dawson, father of Fred Dawson
- Frank LaRue as Theodore Jason
- Allen Cavan as Sheriff
- Jane Keckley as Pocohantas

== Bibliography ==
- Pitts, Michael R. Poverty Row Studios, 1929–1940. McFarland & Company, 2005.
