= The Iron Horse (film) =

1924 film directed by John Ford

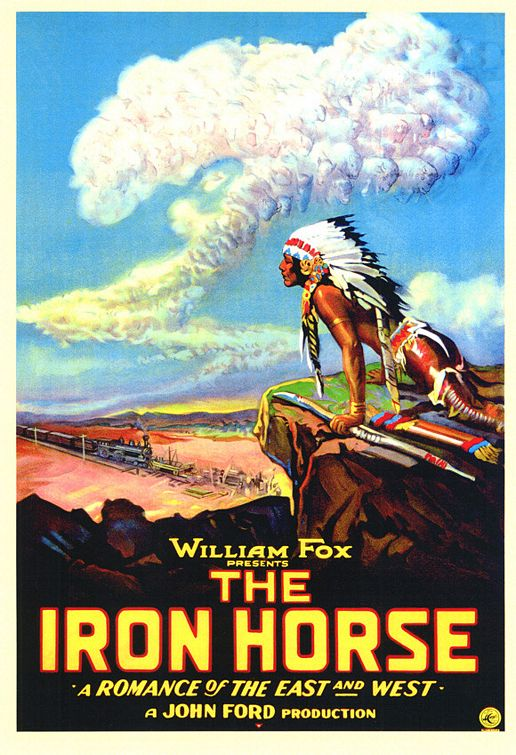
- Film poster
- Directed by: John Ford (uncredited)
- Written by: Charles Kenyon; John Russell; Charles Darnton
- Produced by: John Ford; William Fox
- Starring: George O'Brien; Madge Bellamy
- Cinematography: George Schneiderman
- Edited by: Hettie Gray Baker
- Music by: Ernö Rapée (uncredited)
- Distributed by: Fox Film Corporation
- Release date: August 28, 1924
- Running time: 150 minutes (US version); 133 minutes (International version)
- Country: United States
- Language: Silent (English intertitles)
- Budget: $450,000
- Box office: $3 million

The Iron Horse is a 1924 American silent epic Western film directed by John Ford and produced by Fox Film. It was the studio's hastily planned response to the success of Paramount Pictures' The Covered Wagon. The studio gave Ford his first major budget, which he exceeded. The gamble paid off, and The Iron Horse was an enormous success. The film marked the beginning of Ford's strong association with Westerns.

In 2011, the film was deemed "culturally, historically, or aesthetically significant" by the United States Library of Congress and selected for preservation in the National Film Registry. It is now in public domain.

== Plot ==
The Iron Horse (full film)

In Springfield, Illinois, surveyor David Brandon daydreams about a transcontinental railroad. He is mocked by railroad owner Thomas Marsh. A young Abraham Lincoln visits the men, and Brandon confirms his plan to head west with his son Davy. Marsh's daughter Miriam bids a lovelorn goodbye to Davy.

The Brandons survive the cold and wilderness for three months until they are attacked in the Cheyenne Hills. Davy manages to hide but witnesses his father's murder by a two-fingered white man posing as Cheyenne. He takes refuge with American frontiersmen.

In 1862, Congress authorizes construction of two railways: the westbound Union Pacific and eastbound Central Pacific. Before signing the Pacific Railroad Acts, President Lincoln asks Miriam about Davy's fate. Miriam is unaware, but introduces her fiancé Peter Jesson.

Chinese immigrants are imported to build the first transcontinental railroad. After the Civil War, veterans of the Union and Confederate armies also work on the Union Pacific railway which has now reached North Platte. William F. Cody (Buffalo Bill) provides buffalo meat to the railroad workers.

The Cheyenne attack a payroll and supply train. It prompts Thomas Marsh to seek a shorter route through the Black Hills than the one along the Smoky River. Most of the land on the intended route is owned by Deroux who learns of Marsh's desire for a shortcut. The frustrated workers are freezing and now being asked to work without pay. On her father's behalf, Miriam implores them to keep working.

Jesson is put in charge of charting the shortcut. Meanwhile, Miriam reunites with Davy Brandon. She asks him if there is a shorter route available. He remembers one his father mapped and goes with Jesson to survey it. When they come to a canyon, Jesson cuts a rope holding Davy. He alerts Marsh that Davy is dead, unaware that he survived the fall. Miriam is bereft. Jesson appoints three former soldiers to supervise the completion of the railroad: Sergeant Slattery, Corporal Casey, and Private Mackay.

Upon Davy's return, he is shocked to see the tracks still pointing towards the Smoky River. Miriam is relieved he is alive, but Davy is irate that Jesson lied about the shortcut. They scuffle with each other. Deroux warns Jesson that he needs to get Davy out of the way. He gathers his gang to help Jesson.

Meanwhile, Miriam begs Davy to steer clear of Jesson. She confesses her love for Davy. Jesson tries to shoot Davy in the saloon and a brawl ensues. Davy explains to Miriam how he tried to make peace with Jesson, but she refuses to forgive him.

Deroux enlists the Cheyenne to attack the railroad to prevent it from using Davy's shortcut. During their ambush, Davy fires up the engine and drives it back to town for help. Miriam joins the volunteers who ride back to the battle. The Pawnee serve as their cavalry. During the fighting, the two-fingered renegade is confronted by Davy who recognizes him as Deroux. He kills him and avenges his father's death.

On May 10, 1869 at Promontory Summit, the golden spike is driven to join the Union and Central lines to complete the transcontinental railroad. Davy and Miriam reconcile and marry.

== Cast ==
- George O'Brien - Davy Brandon
- Madge Bellamy - Miriam Marsh
- Charles Edward Bull - Abraham Lincoln
- Cyril Chadwick - Peter Jesson
- Will Walling - Thomas Marsh
- Francis Powers - Sergeant Slattery
- J. Farrell MacDonald - Corporal Casey
- James Welch - Private Schultz / Mackay
- George Waggner - Col. William F. 'Buffalo Bill' Cody
- Fred Kohler - Deroux
- James Marcus - Judge Haller
- Gladys Hulette - Ruby
- Jean Arthur - Reporter (uncredited)
- Chief John Big Tree - Cheyenne Chief (uncredited)
- Jack Padjan - Wild Bill Hickok (uncredited)

== Production ==
William Fox gave John Ford $450,000 to create a picture that would rival Paramount's The Covered Wagon, which had earned millions in 1923. Since it was shot on location, Fox sent Ford to shoot in Wadsworth, Nevada. Sol Wurtzel solved the town's lack of hotels by renting sleeper cars from Al G. Barnes Circus. The cast and crew of 200 left Los Angeles on New Year's Eve 1923.

Most of the Californians were underdressed for temperatures that were below zero and they took to wearing their costumes to stay warm. Barnes' cars were flea-ridden. The result was an impromptu Camp Ford where people slept in tents and the movie sets.

The cast was a broad mix of ethnicities, including Chinese men who had worked as coolies building the Central Pacific. Members of Cheyenne, Paiute, Pawnee, and Sioux tribes played Native Americans in the film. They would also stand in as Chinese and vice versa.

Ford was injured while filming the buffalo stampede. He was positioned in a plank-covered trench when some animals ran over his location. Wurtzel was so encouraged by the rushes that he urged Ford to continue. Ford's older brother Eddie worked as his assistant and ran interference with the studio. Their uncle had laid track for the Union Pacific, and when the difficult shoot wrapped, Ford felt they had experienced something similar.

The film accurately depicts a notable episode during the construction of the Central Pacific route when supply trains had to be hauled overland. Central Pacific loaned Ford its engine No. 3, "C.P. Huntington". 50 horses were hitched to the front of the locomotive while dozens of men pushed from the back. The production also relied on a hidden wires attached to another train to inch the C.P. Huntington along on a sled in the scene. C.P. Huntington was also displayed to promote the West Coast premiere of The Iron Horse.

The title card before the golden spike ceremony includes a note: The locomotives shown in the scene are the original Jupiter and #116. The actual trains (Union Pacific No. 119 and Jupiter) were scrapped in the 1900s.

The finished print ran for 12 reels and 11,355 feet.

== Distribution ==
The Iron Horse opened at Grauman's Egyptian Theatre in Los Angeles on August 24, 1924.

The Iron Horse was promoted heavily in New York City. Skywriters were employed to display the name in giant letters above the skyline. Ernö Rapée composed an orchestral score for the film which was played during its run at the Lyric Theatre.

== Reception ==
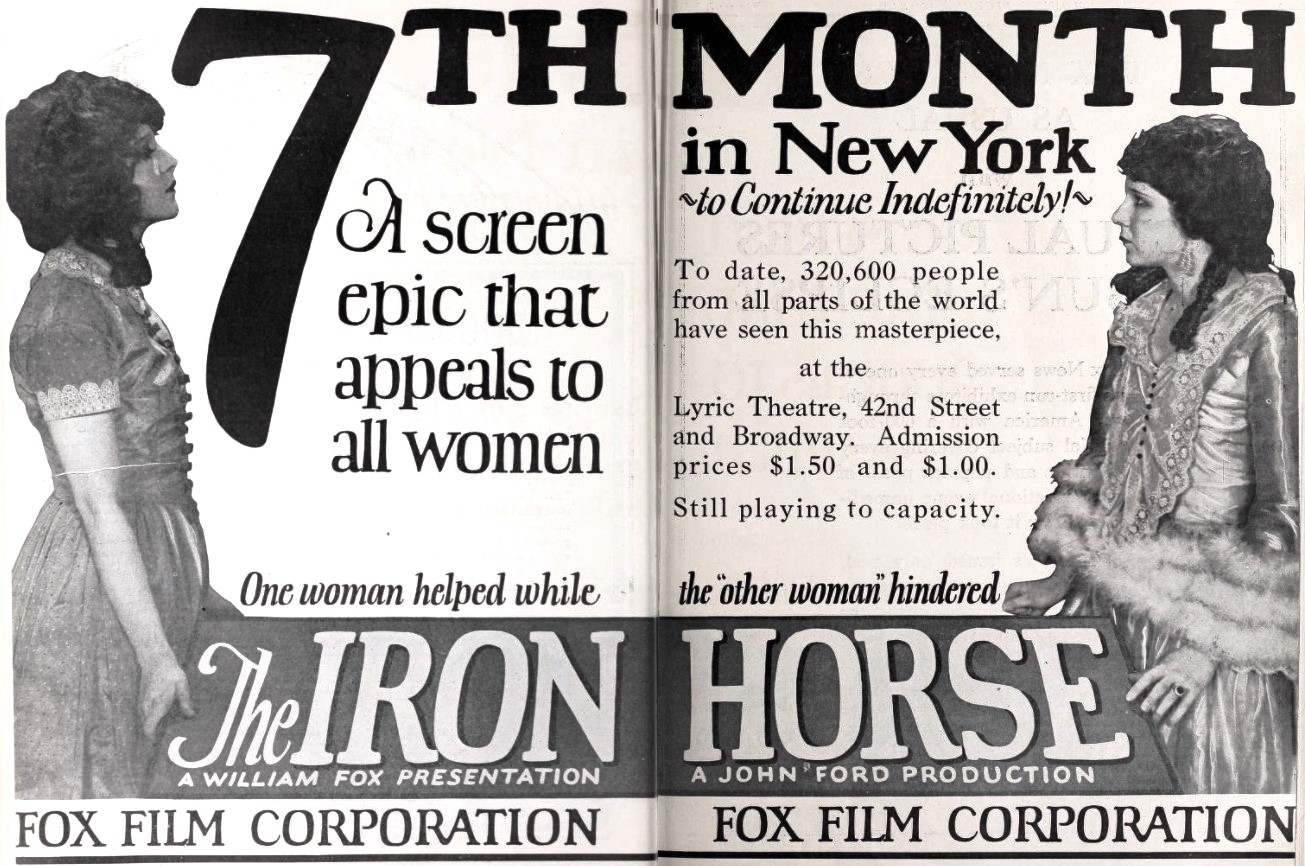
Print advertisement for The Iron Horse.

In the Daily News, Mabel McElliott praised the film and said it came off well in comparison with The Covered Wagon. She did find Rapée's score overwhelming and "hard on the ears". The Los Angeles Express raved, "Nothing more truly dramatic than 'The Iron Horse'...has been put together for the screen".

== Home media ==
The film was released on DVD in America in its full-length US version (accompanied by the truncated UK version). A 2011 release of The Iron Horse on DVD in the UK included both the US and International/UK versions of the picture, and a half-hour video-essay about the film by author and critic Tag Gallagher. The international version includes some variant shots and uses different names for some supporting characters; it also carries a dedication to the British railway engineer George Stephenson.

== Novelization ==
In the early 1920s, Grosset and Dunlap started publishing novelizations of major Hollywood films. Journalist Edwin C. Hill adapted The Iron Horse into a novel in 1924. Hill would become a prominent radio broadcaster best remembered for The Human Side of the News.

== Legacy ==
Ford's upward angle as the locomotive advances over the camera in The Iron Horse became essential visual grammar for Westerns. It is reused in Sergio Leone's 1968 spaghetti western Once Upon a Time in the West. Ford's shot of the railroad slowly advancing on the workers laying its track is also quoted by Cecil B. DeMille in Union Pacific (1939) as well as Leone.

In December 2011, The Iron Horse was selected for inclusion in the Library of Congress' National Film Registry. In choosing the film, the Registry said that The Iron Horse "introduced to American and world audiences a reverential, elegiac mythology that has influenced many subsequent Westerns."

The film's importance was recognized by the American Film Institute in the 2008 AFI's 10 Top 10, where it was nominated in the Western category.

== See also ==
- List of American films of 1924
