= Yes, We Have No Bonanza =

1939 film by Del Lord

- Directed by: Del Lord
- Written by: Searle Kramer; Elwood Ullman
- Produced by: Jules White
- Starring: Moe Howard; Larry Fine; Curly Howard; Dick Curtis; Lynton Brent; Vernon Dent; Lola Jensen; Suzanne Kaaren; Jean Carmen
- Cinematography: Lucien Ballard
- Edited by: Charles Nelson
- Distributed by: Columbia Pictures
- Release date: May 19, 1939 (U.S.)
- Running time: 16:04
- Country: United States
- Language: English

Yes, We Have No Bonanza is a 1939 short subject directed by Del Lord starring American slapstick comedy team The Three Stooges (Moe Howard, Larry Fine and Curly Howard). It is the 39th entry in the series released by Columbia Pictures starring the comedians, who released 190 shorts for the studio between 1934 and 1959.

== Plot ==
The Stooges are employed as singing waiters in a saloon located in the Western frontier, where they perform with a trio of singing cowgirls. Despite their diligent efforts, they are subjected to the cruelty of saloon keeper Maxey, who exploits the girls' labor in consequence of their familial indebtedness to him.

Determined to liberate the cowgirls from their predicament and secure their affections, the Stooges embark on a quest to amass wealth through gold prospecting. Unbeknownst to them, Maxey has recently perpetrated a bank robbery and concealed the stolen loot, $40,000 in stocks and gold bonds, in the vicinity where the Stooges commence their search.

However, a series of mishaps ensue during their prospecting endeavors, culminating in a chaotic sequence of events involving a burro named Yorick, whom the Stooges erroneously believe has swallowed a stick of dynamite and exploded. While the Stooges are mourning Yorick, they stumble upon Maxey's ill-gotten gains, mistakenly believing their fortunes to have turned.

Upon their return to town they are confronted by Maxey, who absconds with the stolen money, prompting a pursuit by the Stooges. Ultimately, they apprehend Maxey and recover the pilfered loot, leading to a fortuitous encounter with the sheriff. The stolen money is duly returned to its rightful owners at the First National Bank, leaving the Stooges to lament that they have no bonanza.

== Production notes ==
Filming for Yes, We Have No Bonanza commenced between November 28 and December 1, 1938. The film's title is a parody of the 1923 song "Yes! We Have No Bananas".

After the dynamite explodes, and thinking that the burro perished in the explosion, Moe misquotes the famous Shakespeare line from "hamlet", the words: "Alas, Poor Yorrick, I knew him (well)"

Early in the movie, Curly is seen riding to the saloon on an Ingo-Bike.
