= Walter Prichard Eaton =

American theatre critic and author

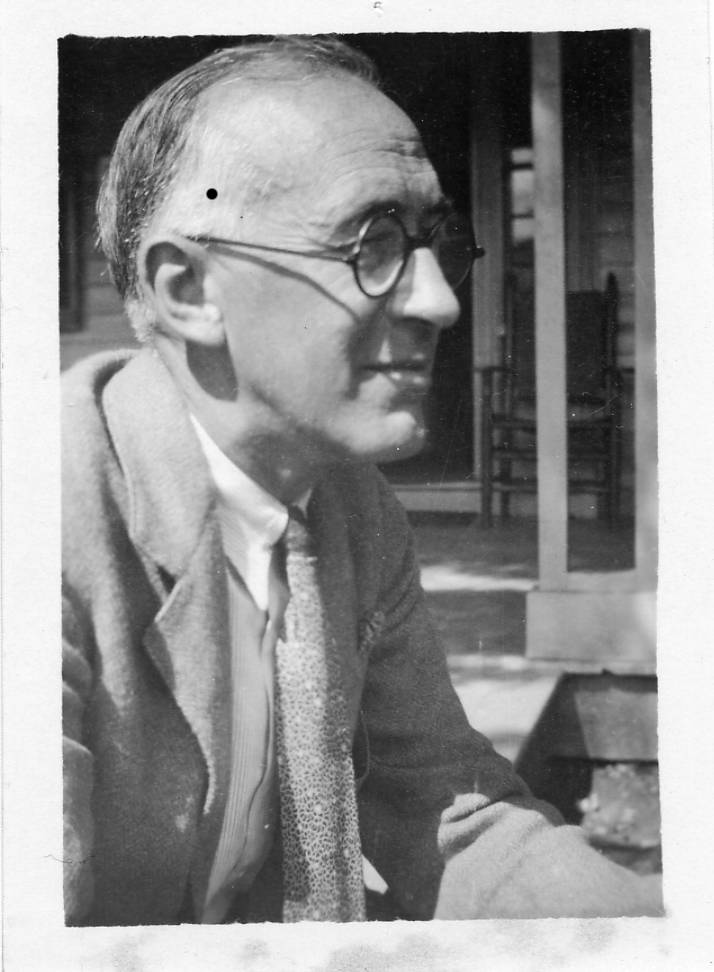
- August 1941
- Born: August 24, 1878; Malden, Massachusetts, U.S.
- Died: 1957 (aged 78–79)
- Occupations: Author, drama critic

Walter Prichard Eaton (August 24, 1878 – 1957) was an American theatre critic and author. Born in Massachusetts, he graduated from Harvard and later worked as a drama critic for various newspapers and magazines. He wrote several books on theatre and served as a professor of playwriting at Yale University. His papers are preserved at the Albert and Shirley Small Special Collections Library at the University of Virginia.
