= Jack Padjan =

American actor (1887–1960)

Jack Padjan (14 December 1887 – 1 February 1960), also known as Jack Duane, was an American stunt performer and actor.

Padjan was born in Silver Bow, Montana. He began acting in Hollywood Westerns in the 1920s, starting with minor roles in films such as The Ten Commandments and The Covered Wagon. In 1924, he played the role of Wild Bill Hickok in The Iron Horse. This was followed by roles in Land of the Lawless (1928) and Crashing Through (1928), for which he was credited as "Jack Duane".

In 1930, he coordinated the stunt performers for The Big Trail, and acted as an advisor to lead actor John Wayne. He acted as Victor McLaglen's stunt double in the 1936 film Under Two Flags. He was injured during the filming of The Lives of a Bengal Lancer, while performing a high fall.

He retired from stunt performance work in the late 1930s and worked as a foreman on a ranch in Chatsworth, California.
