= List of licensed and localized editions of Monopoly: USA =

The following is a list of game boards of the Parker Brothers/Hasbro board game Monopoly adhering to a particular theme or particular locale in the United States. Lists for other regions can be found here. The game is licensed in 103 countries and printed in 37 languages. It is estimated that more than 250 million Monopoly games have been sold and that the game has been played by billions of people.

== Historical ==
- 1935 Classic Reproduction Edition
- 1935 Deluxe First Edition (2002 re-production)
  Copyright date: 1937/2002	Released by: Winning Moves Games	Issued through: General release
  Free Parking	Kentucky Avenue $220	Chance	Indiana Avenue $220	Illinois Avenue $240	B&O Railroad $200	Atlantic Avenue $260	Ventnor Avenue $260	Water Works $150	Marvin Gardens $280	Go To Jail
  New York Avenue $200										Pacific Avenue $300
  Tennessee Avenue $180										North Carolina Avenue $300
  Community Chest										Community Chest
  St. James Place $180										Pennsylvania Avenue $320
  Pennsylvania Railroad $200										Short Line $200
  Virginia Avenue $160										Chance
  States Avenue $140										Park Place $350
  Electric Company $150										Luxury Tax (pay $100)
  St. Charles Place $140										Boardwalk $400
  In Jail/Just Visiting	Connecticut Avenue $120	Vermont Avenue $100	Chance	Oriental Avenue $100	Reading Railroad $200	Income Tax (pay 10% or $300)	Baltic Avenue $60	Community Chest	Mediter-ranean Avenue $60	Go (collect $200)
  Game description: This is a reproduction of a 1935 Monopoly set (specifically the Deluxe Edition #9). The board has the imprint "1933, Chas B. Darrow" in the Jail corner, and the Parker Brothers signature in the Go corner. Many of the graphics are the same, though the icon for Community Chest had not been designed. The Income Tax space is also Pay 10% or $300, instead of the later Pay 10% or $200. Property values are omitted from the board (they were not printed on the original) – a Banker's Rate Card is included with those values, as well as Mortgage values, and the required interest and repayment rates if a property is mortgaged. The property, Chance and Community Chest cards are all reprints from the 1935 edition, and the latter two types feature artwork that was replaced after the development of the more familiar Uncle Pennybags/Mr. Monopoly figure, and had not been seen since 1935. Some boards came with two packs of currency, instead of the usual one. The dice are a standard black pips on white dice, and the houses and hotels are both wooden.
  Tokens: A lantern, an iron, a thimble, a rocking horse, a purse, a battleship, a cannon, a tophat, a shoe and a car.
  Other features: Some of the cards feature instructions that were changed after 1935, such as "A collection has been taken up and everyone must donate 10% of his holdings to you (cash)", and "We're off the Gold Standard, collect $50."
- 1935 Retro Series Edition
- 1935 Commemorative Edition
- (50th) Anniversary Deluxe Edition
- 60th Anniversary Edition
- 70th Anniversary Edition
- 80th Anniversary Edition
- 85th Anniversary Edition
- 1936 Brown Box "New Edition" Edition
- 1936 Super Gold Edition

== Original board with a special design or packaging ==
- The Cat Voted #1 Edition
- The Classic Edition
- Franklin Mint Edition
- Franklin Mint Collector's Edition
- Giant Deluxe Edition
- Hasbro Gaming Road Trip Edition
- Library Classic Games Edition
- Luxe Edition (Navy Blue & Gold, Black & Gold, White & Gold)
- The Mega Edition
  Copyright date: 2006	Released by: Winning Moves Games	Issued through: Initially, Game Specialty Stores and Winning Moves' own website; later, Toys "R" Us stores
  Free Parking	Kentucky Avenue $220	Chance	Indiana Avenue $220	Illinois Avenue $240	Michigan Avenue $240	Bus Ticket	B&O Railroad $200	Atlantic Avenue $260	Ventnor Avenue $260	Water Works $150	Marvin Gardens $280	California Avenue $280	Go To Jail
  New York Avenue $200													Pacific Avenue $300
  New Jersey Avenue $200													South Carolina Avenue $300
  Tennessee Avenue $180													North Carolina Avenue $300
  Community Chest													Community Chest
  St. James Place $180													Pennsylvania Avenue $320
  Pennsylvania Railroad $200													Short Line $200
  Virginia Avenue $160													Chance
  States Avenue $140													Birthday Gift take $100 or a Bus Ticket
  Electric Company $150													Florida Avenue $350
  St. Charles Place $140													Park Place $350
  Maryland Avenue $140													Luxury Tax (pay $75)
  Auction any unowned property													Boardwalk $400
  In Jail/Just Visiting	Connecticut Avenue $120	Vermont Avenue $100	Gas Company $150	Chance	Oriental Avenue $100	Massachusetts Avenue $100	Reading Railroad $200	Income Tax (pay 10% or $200)	Arctic Avenue $80	Baltic Avenue $60	Community Chest	Mediterranean Avenue $60	Go collect $200 salary as you pass
  Game description: This is an expanded edition of the classic game. The larger board encompasses 9 new properties (one for each Color Group and one new Utility) and three new spaces (AUCTION, BUS TICKET and BIRTHDAY GIFT). The gameplay is expedited by inclusion of a third Speed Die (which adds to or affects movement, or awards bonuses) and by an additional deck of 16 Bus Ticket cards (which allow forward movement to any space on the side currently occupied by a player's token; 3 of the cards also negate Tickets held by players by having them expire). It is also enhanced by the inclusion of 8 Skyscrapers (which can be built on full monopolies after Hotels are erected) and 4 Train Depots (which double the rent values of the Railroad spaces).
  Tokens: The current group of eleven standard tokens are included (cannon, boot, thimble, wheelbarrow, car, horse and rider, dog, hat, battleship, iron and money bag).
  Other features: Because of the additional properties, the gameboard is approx. 50% bigger, and the set includes grey-colored $1000 bills. Players start the game with $2500 (adding a $1000 bill to the standard $1500 distribution in the regular game). In addition, gameplay allows players to build Houses and Hotels on a Color Group if they have a Majority Ownership (own all but one of the properties in the Group), but Skyscrapers can only be built on a full Monopoly (owning all the properties in the given Group).
- Nostalgia Wooden Box Edition (2001)
- Onyx Limited Edition
- Parker Brothers Nostalgia Games Series Edition
  Copyright date: 2001	Released by: Parker Brothers/Hasbro	Issued through: Target stores until 2005, general release (except Target stores) as of 2005.
  Free Parking	Kentucky Avenue $220	Chance	Indiana Avenue $220	Illinois Avenue $240	B&O Railroad $200	Atlantic Avenue $260	Ventnor Avenue $260	Water Works $150	Marvin Gardens $280	Go To Jail
  New York Avenue $200										Pacific Avenue $300
  Tennessee Avenue $180										North Carolina Avenue $300
  Community Chest										Community Chest
  St. James Place $180										Pennsylvania Avenue $320
  Pennsylvania Railroad $200										Short Line $200
  Virginia Avenue $160										Chance
  States Avenue $140										Park Place $350
  Electric Company $150										Luxury Tax (pay $100)
  St. Charles Place $140										Boardwalk $400
  In Jail/Just Visiting	Connecticut Avenue $120	Vermont Avenue $100	Chance	Oriental Avenue $100	Reading Railroad $200	Income Tax (pay $200)	Baltic Avenue $60	Community Chest	Mediter-ranean Avenue $60	Go
  Game description: This is a reproduction of a 1957 board and Monopoly set. It uses the standard U.S. Atlantic City properties. The set comes in a wooden case, with a lid that slides off, and holds the board, with compartments for the cards, tokens and paper money. A brief history of the game is reprinted inside the lid. The houses and hotels are similarly made of wood, and come in the original green for houses and red for hotels.
  Tokens: Racecar, dog, top hat, thimble, locomotive and shoe.
  Other features: Slats cut in the box's wooden compartment dividers allow for storage of money by denomination during game play. This game was released as part of a series of Parker Brothers Nostalgia Games, and was exclusive to Target until the line was discontinued in 2005. Other retailers (such as Barnes and Noble Booksellers) bought up the remaining stock for sale. Target replaced the product line with the Hasbro Library series.
- Neon Edition
- Platinum Edition (Barnes & Noble)
- Retro Game Edition (Walmart)
- Rustic Series Edition (Target)
- Signature Token Edition
- Silver Line Edition (Toys "R" Us)
- Sparkle Edition (Amazon)
- Tin Car Case Edition (2001)
- Token Madness Edition
- Train Tin Collector's Edition
- Vintage Game Collection Edition (Wooden Book Shelf)
- Vintage Bookshelf Edition (Linen)
- Zapped Edition

== Numbers ==
- 007 Edition
- 007: 50th Anniversary Edition (Skyfall)
- 007: Collector's Edition
  Copyright date: 2006	Released by: USAopoly under license from Sony/MGM and Hasbro	Issued through: General release
  Free Parking	Kentucky Avenue $220	Chance	Indiana Avenue $220	Illinois Avenue $240	B&O Railroad $200	Atlantic Avenue $260	Ventnor Avenue $260	Water Works $150	Marvin Gardens $280	Go To Jail
  New York Avenue $200										Pacific Avenue $300
  Tennessee Avenue $180										North Carolina Avenue $300
  Community Chest										Community Chest
  St. James Place $180										Pennsylvania Avenue $320
  Pennsylvania Railroad $200										Short Line $200
  Virginia Avenue $160										Chance
  States Avenue $140										Park Place $350
  Electric Company $150										Luxury Tax (pay $100)
  St. Charles Place $140										Boardwalk $400
  In Jail/Just Visiting	Connecticut Avenue $120	Vermont Avenue $100	Chance	Oriental Avenue $100	Reading Railroad $200	Income Tax (pay $200)	Baltic Avenue $60	Community Chest	Mediter-ranean Avenue $60	Go
  Game description: This edition focuses solely on James Bond movies, though the three non-Eon versions have been omitted. The only property on the board that is not a movie is 007 Assignment; the twenty-first movie, the 2006 Casino Royale is included. The Chance and Community Chest spaces have been replaced by: Bond Women and Bond Villains. There is a different colour photo on top of each card. The railways have been replaced by: Aston Martin DB5, Mustang, Lotus Esprit and Aston Martin DBS. The Luxury tax space has been replaced by Casino Tax.
  Tokens: 007 logo, Aston Martin DBS, Lotus Esprit sub, BD-5J, Rosa Klebb's Shoe and Oddjob's Hat.
- 007: James Bond Ultimate Collector's Edition
- 2006 FIFA World Cup Edition (2006)

== A ==
- Achievement Hunter Edition
- AC/DC Collector's Edition
- Adventure Time Edition
  Released by: USAopoly under license from Hasbro	Issued through: General release
  Free Parking	Land of the Dead $220	Algebraic!	Nightosphere $220	Fire Kingdom $240	Bananaman Rocket $200	Billy's Cave $260	Marceline's House $260	BMO $150	Crystal Dimension $280	Go To Jail
  Lumpy Space $200										Hot Dog Kingdom $300
  Mars $180										Wildberry Kingdom $300
  What the Lump?										What the Lump?
  Astral Plane $180										Cloud Kingdom $320
  The Morrow $200										Lady Rainicorn $200
  Marauder Village $160										Algebraic!
  Wizard Village $140										Finn and Jake's Treehouse $350
  N.E.P.T.R. $150										Jacked Up! (pay $100)
  Mushroom Village $140										Candy Kingdom $400
  In Jail/Just Visiting	Ice Kingdom $120	City of Thieves $100	Algebraic!	Goblin Kingdom $100	Ancient Psychic Tandem War Elephant $200	Jerk Tax (pay $200)	Tree Trunks' Farm $60	What the Lump?	LSP's Hobo Camp $60	Go
  Tokens: Finn the Human, Jake the Dog, Princess Bubblegum, Ice King's crown, LSP in car, and Tree Trunks with wheelbarrow.
- America Special Edition
- American Chopper Edition (2006)
- The American Express Funds Edition (2000)
  Copyright date: 2000	Released by: American Express Mutual Fund Co. (AXP Funds), a subsidiary at the time of American Express, Inc., under license from USAopoly	Issued through: Not sold to the public. This was a limited release used by the company as a promotional prize to its financial advisors.
  Game description: Only 2000 games were ever produced, the minimum run allowed at the time by USAopoly. The game was distributed in the year 2000 by the American Express Funds Company to its captive network of financial advisors. The intent was to reward advisors who sold a high volume of American Express Funds and to encourage other advisors to increase their sales of AXP funds. The game was designed so that the advisors could also give the game to their clients or use it as a sales tool to introduce AXP funds. The board was populated by various AXP Mutual Funds, with the places of Boardwalk and Park Place taken by AXP New Dimensions and AXP Growth, two of the company's best performing funds at the time. Because securities are a regulated industry, the game had to meet NASD legal requirements, which required careful wording of everything to avoid misleading investors. In 2005, American Express Financial Advisors was spun off from its parent company, American Express, Inc. It is now Ameriprise Financial, Inc. and the AXP Funds Company is now RiverSource Funds.
  Tokens: To reduce costs, the traditional pewter tokens were used.
  Other features: Chance and Community Chest cards were replaced due to legal concerns to Service and Planning Cards. A package of 32 Asset Allocations 12 Comprehensive Plans were also included.
- America's National Parks Edition (2005)
- America's World War II Edition
- Alaska Iditarod Edition
- AMG 50th Anniversary Edition
- Angry Birds Edition
- Animal Crossing: New Horizons Edition (2021)
- Animaniacs Edition
- App Banking Edition
- Ariel Edition (2005)
- Assassin's Creed Edition
- Assassin's Creed Syndicate Edition
- Astronomy Edition
- Atlantic City (pre-2008)
  Released by: Parker Brothers	Issued through: General release
  Free Parking	Kentucky Avenue $220	Chance	Indiana Avenue $220	Illinois Avenue $240	B&O Railroad $200	Atlantic Avenue $260	Ventnor Avenue $260	Water Works $150	Marvin Gardens $280	Go To Jail
  New York Avenue $200										Pacific Avenue $300
  Tennessee Avenue $180										North Carolina Avenue $300
  Community Chest										Community Chest
  St. James Place $180										Pennsylvania Avenue $320
  Pennsylvania Railroad $200										Short Line $200
  Virginia Avenue $160										Chance
  States Avenue $140										Park Place $350
  Electric Company $150										Luxury Tax (pay $75)
  St. Charles Place $140										Boardwalk $400
  In Jail/Just Visiting	Connecticut Avenue $120	Vermont Avenue $100	Chance	Oriental Avenue $100	Reading Railroad $200	Income Tax(pay 10% or $200)	Baltic Avenue $60	Community Chest	Mediterranean Avenue $60	Go (collect $200)
- Atlantic City (2008-2025)
  Released by: Parker Brothers	Issued through: General release
  Free Parking	Kentucky Avenue $220	Chance	Indiana Avenue $220	Illinois Avenue $240	B&O Railroad $200	Atlantic Avenue $260	Ventnor Avenue $260	Water Works $150	Marvin Gardens $280	Go To Jail
  New York Avenue $200										Pacific Avenue $300
  Tennessee Avenue $180										North Carolina Avenue $300
  Community Chest										Community Chest
  St. James Place $180										Pennsylvania Avenue $320
  Pennsylvania Railroad $200										Short Line $200
  Virginia Avenue $160										Chance
  States Avenue $140										Park Place $350
  Electric Company $150										Luxury Tax (pay $100)
  St. Charles Place $140										Boardwalk $400
  In Jail/Just Visiting	Connecticut Avenue $120	Vermont Avenue $100	Chance	Oriental Avenue $100	Reading Railroad $200	Income Tax (pay $200)	Baltic Avenue $60	Community Chest	Mediterranean Avenue $60	Go (collect $200)
- Atlantic City (since July 2025)
  Released by: Parker Brothers	Issued through: General release
  Free Parking	Kentucky Avenue $220	Chance	Indiana Avenue $220	Illinois Avenue $240	B&O Railroad $200	Atlantic Avenue $260	Ventnor Avenue $260	Water Works $150	Marvin Gardens $280	Go To Jail
  New York Avenue $200										Pacific Avenue $300
  Tennessee Avenue $180										North Carolina Avenue $300
  Community Chest										Community Chest
  St. James Place $180										Pennsylvania Avenue $320
  Pennsylvania Railroad $200										Short Line $200
  Virginia Avenue $160										Chance
  States Avenue $140										Park Place $350
  Electric Company $150										Luxury Tax (pay $100)
  St. Charles Place $140										Boardwalk $400
  In Jail/Just Visiting	Connecticut Avenue $120	Vermont Avenue $100	Chance	Rhode Island Avenue $100	Reading Railroad $200	Income Tax (pay $200)	Baltic Avenue $60	Community Chest	Mediterranean Avenue $60	Go (collect $200)
- Attack on Titan Edition (2016)
- Avalon Communications Edition (2001)
- The Avengers (Marvel) Edition (2014)
- The Avengers (Marvel) Edition (2018)

== B ==
- Back to the Future Edition
- Back to the Future Trilogy Edition
- Bank of America and MLB Edition (2005)
- Bank of America Toy Bank Edition (2004)
- Bass Fishing Lakes Edition (2005)
- Batman Edition (2006)
- Batman and Robin (1997)
  Free Parking	Alfred's Pantry	Batman Card	Wayne Manor Garage	Wayne Fountain	Freeze's Mobile	Mr Freeze's Lair	Mr Freeze's Vault	Ice Cream Factory	Gotham City Observatory	Go To Jail
  Mr Freeze's Cell										Blossom Street Station
  Gotham City Museum										Poison Ivy's Lair
  Robin Card										Robin Card
  Diamonds										Botanical Gardens
  Bathammer										Robin's Redbird
  Crime Alley										Batman Card
  Holographic Gym										Batcave
  Arkham Asylum										Political Bribes
  Observatory Island										Wayne Manor
  Jail	Gotham City Airport	Dr Woodrue's Lab	Batman Card	Pamela Isley's Lab	Batmobile	Police Protection	Biker Race	Robin Card	Biker Alley	Go
  Tokens: Batman, Robin, Ivy, Freeze, The Batmobile, The Freezemobile, The Bathammer, The Redbird
- BBK Clinical Research and Development Edition (2007)
- The Beatles Edition
  Released by: Apple Studios	Issued through: General Release
  Game description: The Beatles Collector's Edition replaces all normal properties with Beatles albums and other points of interest, and includes every single known album ever produced by The Beatles, listed in chronological order from their release dates. It also includes special Fabs versions of the pewter tokens. Many other aspects of the game are changed. For example, the railroads are concert tickets, chance and community chest are The Fab Four and Beatlemania, the houses (white) and hotels (black) are listening parties and concerts, and money is called love, a reference to All You Need Is Love.
  Tokens: An octopus (Octopus's Garden), a walrus (I Am The Walrus), a strawberry (Strawberry Fields Forever), a raccoon (Rocky Raccoon), the sun (Here Comes The Sun), and a hammer (Maxwell's Silver Hammer)
- The Beatles Collector's Edition
- The Beatles Yellow Submarine Edition
- Beetlejuice Edition
- Belkin Edition (2006)
- Berkshire Hathaway Diamond Edition (2005)
- Best Buy Corp. Edition (2002)
- Betty Boop Collector's Edition (2002)
  Copyright date: 2002	Released by: USAopoly
  Free Parking	Hula Betty $220	Wink	Surfing Betty $220	Bamboo Betty $240	London $200	Easy Rider Betty $260	Biker Betty $260	Bathing Beauty $150	Queen of Hearts $280	Go To Jail
  Cowgirl Betty $200										Hollyboop $300
  Lasso Betty $180										Star Betty $300
  Smile										Wink
  Rodeo Betty $180										Pin Up Betty $320
  Las Vegas $200										Paris $200
  Jukebox Betty $160										Smile
  Letter Sweater Betty $140										Celebrity Betty $350
  Electric Betty $150										Talkartoon Tickets (pay $75)
  Radio Betty $140										Classic Betty $400
  In Jail/Just Visiting	Sunday's Best $120	Any Rags? $100	Wink	Dizzy Dishes $100	New York City $200	Screen Actors Guild Dues (pay 10%/$200)	Basic Betty $60	Smile	Bimbo's Girlfriend $60	Go
- The Big Bang Theory Edition
- The Big Friendly Giant Edition (BFG)
- Black Panther Edition
- Black Panther: Wakanda Forever Edition
- Bob's Burgers Edition
  Released by: USAopoly under license from Hasbro	Issued through: General release
  Free Parking	Elegant Doily Retirement Home $220	White Pants Take a Chance	Caffrey Taffy Factory $220	Capoeira Center for Capoeira $240	Scramble Pan $200	Pickles $260	OMG Mall $260	Dr. Yap's Dental Care $150	Fig Jam $280	Go To Jail
  Wagstaff School $200										Glencrest Yacht Club $300
  Family Funtime $180										Beville's $300
  Community Garden										Community Garden
  Reggie's Deli $180										Wharf Arts Center $320
  Scream-i-Cane $200										Tickle Boat $200
  First Oceanside Savings Bank $160										White Pants Take a Chance
  The Petalphile $140										Fischoeder's Estate $350
  Teddy's Handyman Service $150										Health Inspection (pay $100)
  Jimmy Pesto's Pizzeria $140										Wonder Wharf $400
  In Jail/Just Visiting	Yours Truly Stationery $120	Art Supply Store $100	White Pants Take a Chance	It's Your Funeral Home & Crematorium $100	Ferris Wheel $200	Lend Gayle Money (pay $200)	Bob's Burgers $60	Community Garden	Vacant Storefront $60	Go
  Tokens: Bob, Linda, Tina, Gene, Louise, and Teddy.
- BoJack Horseman Edition
- Boutique Edition
- Boy Scouts of America 95th Anniversary Edition
- Boy Scouts of America 100th Anniversary Edition
- Bratz Edition
- Brave Edition
- Britney Spears Edition (2023)

== C ==
- California Centers Magazine Edition
- California Centers Magazine Collector's Edition
- Call of Duty: Black Ops Edition
- Candy Crush Edition
- Coraline Edition
- Cat Lover's Edition
- Cats vs. Dogs Edition
- Cedar Point-opoly
- Century of Flight: Aviation Edition
- Championship Edition
- Chance Edition
- Cheaters Edition
- Cheerleading Edition
- ChileHeads Edition (2004)
- Chocolateopoly Edition
- Christmas Edition
- A Christmas Story Edition (2007, 2008, 2009)
- Chrysler Town & Country Road Trip Edition (2007)
- Clemsonopoly (Clemson University Edition)
- Coca-Cola 125th Anniversary Collector's Edition (2010)
- Coca-Cola Classic Ads Collector's Edition (2005)
- Coca-Cola Collector's Edition (1999)
- Cornwell Quality Tools 95 Years Anniversary Edition (2014)
- Corvette Edition (1997)
- Corvette 50th Anniversary Collector's Edition (2003)
- Costco Edition
- Crooks and Castles Collector's Edition (2013)
- Cthulhu Edition
- Cottage Grove Edition

== D ==
- The .com Edition (2000)
  Copyright date: 2000	Released by: Parker Brothers/Hasbro	Issued through: General release
  Free Parking	weather.com	E-mail Just in!	About.com	Cnet.com	Sprint	Etrade	monster.com	Sun Microsystems	CBS MarketWatch	Go To Jail
  EBay										AskJeeves
  Expedia.com										AltaVista
  Download										Download
  Priceline.com										Lycos
  MCI WorldCom										Lycos
  Eonline										AT&T
  Games.com										Excite@Home
  Linux										ISP Fee
  shockwave.com										Yahoo!
  In Jail/Just Visiting	iVillage.com	(oxygen)	E-mail Just in!	Yahoo! GeoCities	Nokia	Income Tax	FoxSports.com	Download	SportsLine.com	Go
  Game description: This was a special edition to capitalize on the dot Com craze of the late 1990s. The properties feature the logos of many Internet companies, including Yahoo!, E*TRADE, eBay and Priceline.com. Currency was changed so that it was denominated in millions of dollars; the dark purple properties sold at $60 million each, and the dark blue properties sold at $350 million and $400 million. Community Chest became Download and Chance became E-mail Just In! Houses and hotels were changed from their familiar green and red colors to blue and red, and were renamed Households and Offices. The Income Tax space remained fairly similar (10% or $200 million), but the Luxury Tax space became ISP Fee: Pay $75 million. The four railroad spaces became four companies involved in telecommunications: Nokia, MCI Worldcom, Sprint and AT&T. The two utilities became Linux and Sun Microsystems. Trademark disclaimers were made for all participating companies in fine print on the game board itself.
  Tokens: Eight pewter tokens were available, plus a special Mr. Monopoly at his computer token that could be used as a game piece, or for a special rule variant. The other eight tokens are: a computer desktop (tower, monitor and keyboard), a pointing hand (such as the icon that appears in many web browsers when the mouse pointer hovers over a hyperlink), a surfboard, a flat panel monitor, a mouse (made to look like a real mouse, instead of a computer mouse), another hand holding an envelope (supposedly representing e-mail), a pixelated arrow cursor and a microchip made to look like a bug.
  Other features: This edition introduced an offline rule, for optional use with the Mr. Monopoly at his computer token. This token is moved onto any space that has a Title Deed card whenever any player moves doubles. That space is considered offline, and no rent can be collected for it unless someone rolls doubles again and moves the token, or someone lands on the space and moves the token (bringing the site back online, thus rent can be charged for it again the next time someone lands on the space, provided the special token was not returned there in the meantime).
- Davita Collector's Edition
- DC Comics 1st Special Edition
- D-Day Edition
- Dale Earnhardt Collector's Edition (2000) (The first edition based on a person.)
- Dale Earnhardt Legacy Edition (2003)
- Deadpool Edition
- Deadpool Collector's Edition
- Deluxe Edition (1995)
- Deluxe Vintage 5-in-1 Edition
- Despicable Me Edition
- Despicable Me 2 Edition
- Disney Edition (2001)
  Copyright date: 2001
  Free Parking	Steamboat Willie $220	Show Time	Sleeping Beauty $220	Lady and the Tramp $240	Cinderella's Coach $200	Mulan $260	Alice in Wonderland $260	Pixie Dust $150	Cinderella $280	Go To Jail
  The Jungle Book $200										Bambi $300
  The Rescuers $180										Aladdin $300
  Magic Moments										Magic Moments
  The Fox and the Hound $180										Pinocchio $320
  Captain Hook's Pirate Ship $200										Cruella de Vil's Car $200
  The Little Mermaid $160										Show Time
  Beauty and the Beast $140										The Lion King $350
  Magic Wand $150										Prince John's Tax (pay $100)
  Dumbo $140										One Hundred and One Dalmatians $400
  In Jail/Just Visiting	Snow White and the Seven Dwarfs $120	Pocahontas $100	Show Time	Peter Pan $100	Aladdin's Magic Carpet $200	Scrooge McDuck's Tax (pay 10%/$200)	Toy Story $60	Magic Moments	Tarzan $60	Go
- Disney Cars 2 Edition
- Disney "Celebrate the magic and memories of Disney Animation" Edition
- Disney Chronicles of Narnia Edition
- Disney Frozen II Edition
- Disney The Lion King Edition
- Disney My Villains Edition (2008)
- Disney Theme Park Edition
  Copyright date: 2002	Issued through: Available only in Disney theme parks.
  Free Parking	Hollywood Tower Hotel	Wishing Well	Kilimanjaro Safaris	Spaceship Earth	Walt Disney World Resort Bus	Buzz Lightyear's Space Ranger Spin	Splash Mountain	Disney Magic	The Haunted Mansion	Go To Jail
  Journey to the Center of the Earth										Mr. Toad's World Ride
  Big Thunder Mountain Railroad										Mad Tea Party
  Magic Lamp										Magic Lamp
  Jungle Cruise										California Screamin'
  Tokyo Disneyland Boat										Disneyland Resort Monorail
  Dumbo The Flying Elephant										Wishing Well
  Peter Pan's Flight										"It's a Small World"
  Disney Wonder										Villain's Tax
  Castle Carousel										Matterhorn
  In Jail/Just Visiting	Pirates of the Caribbean	Space Mountain	Wishing Well	Orbitron	Disneyland Paris Train	Villain's Tax	Star Tours	Magic Lamp	Indiana Jones And The Temple Of Peril	Go
  Game description: This is a special edition sold only in Disney theme parks. The game comes in a tin with a quarter-fold board. Properties have been replaced by various attraction in Disney theme parks around the world. The railroads are replaced with a form of transportation used in each of four Disney parks: The Disneyland Monorail, the Disneyland Paris Train, the Tokyo Disneyland Boat (which is actually used in Tokyo DisneySea), and the Walt Disney World Bus. Chance and Community Chest have become Wishing Well and Magic Lamp, respectively. Houses became Main Street Buildings, and hotels became Castles (which came in two designs, one modeled after Sleeping Beauty Castle and the other after Cinderella Castle). The money is slightly smaller than the original and are referred to as wishes instead of dollars; however, they are included in the same denominations and colors as the original game. The game also includes a black plastic tray with slots which can be used to hold the banker's wishes in a vertical position.
  Tokens: Tokens are pewter and include a Splash Mountain log, a monorail cab, a Mr. Toad's Wild Ride car, an Astro Orbiter rocket, a ship from Tokyo DisneySea, a train locomotive, a Mad Tea Party teacup, and a Haunted Mansion Doom Buggy. In the newest edition there are different tokens than in the first edition. Also they added Expedition Everest as the best property. In this newer, still special edition, there are "Sorcerer's hat" and "Magic Mirror" instead of Wishing Well and Magic Lamp.
- Disney Theme Park II Edition
- Disney Theme Park III Edition
  Copyright date: 2010	Released by: Parker Brothers	Issued through: Available only in Disney theme parks.
  Free Parking	Grizzly River Run	Happily ever after...	California Screamin'	Toy Story Mania	Disney Bus	Test Track	Mission SPACE	Walt Disney World City Hall	Soarin'	Go To Jail
  Kilimanjaro Safari										King Arthur Carrousel
  Dinosaur										Dumbo the Flying Elephant
  Once upon a time...										Once upon a time...
  Expedition Everest										"it's a small world"
  Disney Boat										Disney Train
  Hollywood Tower Hotel										Happy ever after...
  The Great Movie Ride										Space Mountain
  Disneyland Fire Dept										"I'm surrounded by Idiots" Tax
  Muppet Vision 3D										Matterhorn Bobsleds
  In Jail/Just Visiting	Jungle Cruise	Enchanted Tiki Room	Happily ever after...	Pirates of the Caribbean	Disney Monorail	Maleficent's Evil Spell Tax	20,000 Leagues Under the Sea	Once upon a time...	Skyway	Go
  Game description: Monopoly® Disney Theme Park Edition III Game lets you relive the excitement of all your favorite attractions at Disney Theme Parks -- from The Haunted Mansion® attraction to the Disney Monorail -- with this very special edition of the classic Monopoly® board game. Magic Mirror and Sorcerers Hat cards might make your dreams come true or they might bring an unexpected trip to jail. Use your Wishes wisely to collect the deeds to Disney Theme Park attractions; increase their value by adding Mickeys Toontown houses and Disney castles on your way to victory!
  - Money: 7 Denominations of Wishes Disney-themed play money.
  - Houses & Hotels: Mickey's Toontown and Cinderella Castles.
  - Chance & Community Chest Cards: 'Once upon a time...' and 'Happy ever after...'.
  Tokens: Tokens are pewter and include a Figment, Sorcerer Mickey, Goofy, Princess Minnie, Tinker Bell, Yeti, and Partners Statue. These are different tokens then the first two Disney Theme Park Editions.
  Other features: Large 3D Popup Castle in the middle of the board.
- Disney Theme Park (Pop-up Castle 2019) Edition
- Disney/Pixar Edition (2005, 2007)
- Disney Vacation Club Edition
- Disney Villains Edition
- Dinosaur Edition
- Doctor Who 50th Anniversary Edition
- Doctor Who Edition
- Doctor Who Villains Edition
- The Dog Artist Edition
- Dog Lover's Edition
- Dominick's Collector's Edition
  Copyright date: 2006	Released by: USAopoly under license from Hasbro	Issued through: Exclusive to Dominick's supermarkets.
  Game description: In December 2006, the Dominick's division of Safeway, Inc. produced a Collector's Edition Monopoly set, honoring the chain's approximately ninety-year history. The game board has been changed to reflect departments within Dominick's supermarkets, with properties such as Grocery Department, Frozen Department, Dairy Department, Health & Beauty Department and Bakery Department. The four railroads became the Commissary, Donna's Distribution, Distribution Center and CPS Warehouse. Community Chest and Chance became Plastic and Paper (bags), respectively, with themes such as "Store Manager caught standing on a milk crate! Pay each player $50 for setting a bad example." The Electric Company and Water Works became Ludwig Dairy and Rancher's Reserve Ranch respectively. Income Tax and Luxury Tax kept their usual amounts, but became Repair Fee and Charitable Donation respectively.
  Tokens: Tokens are pewter and include: a shopping cart, an apple, a pizza, a cash register, a gallon of milk and a truck bearing the Dominick's logo.
  Other features: Properties, houses, hotels and currency retained their usual colors, based on the US Standard Edition. Houses and Hotels also retain the same shape, but are known as New Products and Merchandise Displays respectively. The currency features the Monopoly logo in a banner scroll at the top of every bill, and each uses the Chicago skyline as a full backdrop. The varying denominations each have a different Dominick's corporate logo from the company's history, with the exception of the 20, which uses the logo for the now defunct Omni Superstore, a former Dominick's division.
- Doraemon Edition
- Dragon Ball Super Edition
- Dragon Ball Z Edition
  Released by: USAopoly under license from Hasbro	Issued through: General release
  Free Parking	Piccolo; M220	Capsule Corp	Trunks; M220	Vegeta; M240	Flying Nimbus; M200	Android 16; M260	Android 17; M260	Dr. Brief; M150	Android 18; M280	Go To Jail
  Krillin; M200										Imperfect Cell; M300
  Tien Shinhan; M180										Semi-Perfect Cell; M300
  Red Ribbon Army										Red Ribbon Army
  Yamcha; M180										Perfect Cell; M320
  Capsule Corp Ship; M200										Trunks' Time Machine; M200
  King Kai; M160										Capsule Corp
  Dende; M140										Gohan; M350
  Bulma; M150										Use Senzu Bean (pay M100)
  Master Roshi; M140										Goku; M400
  In Jail/Just Visiting	Hercule; M120	Pirozhki; M100	Capsule Corp	Caroni; M100	Goku's Car; M200	Collateral Damage (pay M200)	Johnny Firecracker; M60	Red Ribbon Army	Miss Piiza; M60	Go
  Game description: {{{Game_description}}}
- Duel Masters Edition
- Dungeons & Dragons: Honor Among Thieves Edition

== E ==
- 80th Anniversary Edition
- 85th Anniversary Edition
- Electronic Banking Edition
- Elf Edition
- Elvis 25th Anniversary Collector's Edition
- Elvis 75th Anniversary Collector's Edition
- Elvis Collector's Edition (2002)
- Elvis Collector's Edition (2011)
- Emergency Medical Services Edition
- Empire Edition
- ESPN Ultimate Sports Fan Edition (2006)
- European Edition

== F ==
- Fall Guys Edition
- Fallout Edition
- Fallout Edition (Hot Topic)
- Family Guy Collector's Edition (2006, 2010)
- Fantastic Four Collector's Edition
- FAO Schwarz 150th Anniversary Edition
- Fazzino World Edition
- FedEx Edition (2004)
- FedEx 2nd Edition (2005)
- Firefighters Edition
- Firefighters 2nd Alarm Edition
- Firefighters 3rd Alarm Edition
- Firefly Edition
- Fisher Scientific Centennial Edition
- Five Nights at Freddy's Edition (2018; USAopoly)
- Five Nights at Freddy's Edition (2018 - Square Box; USAopoly; GameStop)
- Ford Edition
- Ford 100th Anniversary Collector's Edition
- Formula 1 Edition
- Fortnite Edition (2018 - Blue Box)
- Fortnite Edition (2018 - Purple Box)
- Foxwoods Resort Casino Special Edition
- Friends Edition
- Futurama Edition
- Future Electronics Collector's Edition

[For sore losers]

== G ==
Giant Edition (2012)

Game of Thrones Edition (2015, 2018)

Gamer Edition

Gamer Collector's Edition (GameStop)

Gamer: Mario Kart Edition

Gamer: Overwatch Edition

Gamer: Sonic the Hedgehog Edition

Garfield Collector's Edition

General Mills Collector's Edition (2006)

Copyright date: 2006	Released by: Parker Brothers/Hasbro	Issued through: General Mills Employees

Game description: This is a limited edition item made available to employees only! Rumor has it only 1300 of these games were made.
Tokens: General Mills characters: Hamburger Helper Helping Hand, Betty Crocker Spoon, Trix Rabbit, Lucky Leprechaun, Cheerios Racecar, Totino's Pizza, Green Giant Sprout, and the Pillsbury Doughboy.

Ghostbusters Collector's Edition

G.I. Joe Collector's Edition

Godfather Collector's Edition

Copyright date: 2012	Released by: USAopoly	Issued through: General release

Free Parking	Don Ciccio Estate $220	Enemies	Corleone Apartment $220	Tammasino Estate $240	Delivery Truck $200	Sicilian Church $260	St. Patrick's $260	Politicians $150	St. Peter's Basilica $280	Go To Jail
Woltz Mansion $200	Godfather Collector's Edition									Teatro Massimo $300
Woltz Intl Pictures $180	Godfather Collector's Edition									Abbandando Grosseria $300
Friends	Godfather Collector's Edition									Friends
Moe Green's Casino $180	Godfather Collector's Edition									Genco Import Co. $320
Getaway Car $200	Godfather Collector's Edition									Passenger Train $200
Louie's Restaurant	Godfather Collector's Edition									Enemies
Jack Dempsey's $140	Godfather Collector's Edition									Corleone Estate $350
Cops $150	Godfather Collector's Edition									Legitimate Business Tax (pay $100)
Joe's Diner $140	Godfather Collector's Edition									Corleone Home $400
In Jail/Just Visiting	Calvary Cemetery $120	Jones Beach Toll $100	Enemies	Clemenza's House $100	Fishing Boat $200	Bribery (pay $200)	Havana Capri $60	Friends	Hyman Roth's Home $60	Go (collect $200)

Game description: This Monopoly edition is based on the Godfather Saga. Deed cards represent properties in New York, Sicily, Miami, Havana, and Nevada.
Tokens: The six tokens include a horse head, a cannoli, a Genco Olive Oil tin, the Don's limo, a dead fish and a tommy gun.
Other features: "Community Chest" and "Chance" cards have been replaced with "Friends" and "Enemies" cards. Traditional houses and hotels have been turned into Hideouts and Compounds, and the game features new "Don" cards allowing each player to align with a particular family and employ a potentially lethal strike. The Corleone card, for instance, entitles the bearer to a kidnapping of an opponent while the Tattaglia card affords its owner a single money laundering opportunity.

The Golden Girls Edition

Golf Edition (1996, 1998, 2000)

Copyright date: 1996	Released by: USAopoly	Issued through: General release

Free Parking	Doral $220	Chance	La Quinta $220	PGA West $240	Nabisco Dinah Shore $200	Kapaulua $260	Spyglass Hill $260	Water Works $150	Bay Hill $280	Go To Jail
PGA Tour $200	Golf Edition (1996, 1998, 2000)									Ahworth Golf Company $300
Senior PGA Tour $180	Golf Edition (1996, 1998, 2000)									Top Flite $300
Community Chest	Golf Edition (1996, 1998, 2000)									Community Chest
LPGA $180	Golf Edition (1996, 1998, 2000)									Callaway $320
AT&T Pebble Beach $200	Golf Edition (1996, 1998, 2000)									The Players Championship $200
TPC Sawgrass $160	Golf Edition (1996, 1998, 2000)									Chance
TPC Woodlands $140	Golf Edition (1996, 1998, 2000)									Pinehurst $350
Electric Company $150	Golf Edition (1996, 1998, 2000)									Luxury Tax (pay $100)
TPC Scottsdale $140	Golf Edition (1996, 1998, 2000)									Pebble Beach $400
In Jail/Just Visiting	The Homestead $120	Aviara Golf Club $100	Chance	Torrey Pines $100	Andersen Consulting World Golf Championship $200	City Tax (pay 10% or $300)	Golf Digest $60	Community Chest	Golf World $60	Go (collect $200)

Game description: This is the 1996 Golf Edition of Monopoly. The gameplay is the same as in the regular version. The only noticeable differences are that the regular properties are replaced with Golf Clubs and Championships, and that the Income Tax is renamed City Tax.
Tokens: A car, a Top Hat, A shoe, a thimble, an iron, a battleship, a horse and rider, a wheelbarrow, a dog, and a wheel.
Other features: {{{Other_features}}}

Golf Signature Holes Edition (2005)

Glass Edition

Guardians of the Galaxy Vol. 2 Edition

GWopoly

== H ==
Halo Collector's Edition

Hallmark Channel Edition

Hard Rock Cafe Edition (2006, 2010)

Harley-Davidson 95th Anniversary Limited Collector's Edition (1998)

Harley Davidson Authorized Edition (1997)

Free Parking	Harley Davidson XR750	Chance	Harley Davidson Super Twins	Harley Davidson VR1000	Shovelhead	www.harleydavidson.com	Harley Owners Group	Motorcycle Oil	Enthusiast	Go To Jail
Heritage Springer	Harley Davidson Authorized Edition (1997)									Road King Classic
Heritage Softail Classic	Harley Davidson Authorized Edition (1997)									Electra Glide Standard
Community Chest	Harley Davidson Authorized Edition (1997)									Community Chest
Fat Boy	Harley Davidson Authorized Edition (1997)									Road Glide
Panhead	Harley Davidson Authorized Edition (1997)									Evolution
Softail Custom	Harley Davidson Authorized Edition (1997)									Chance
Dyna Wide Glide	Harley Davidson Authorized Edition (1997)									Bar and Shield
Spark Plug	Harley Davidson Authorized Edition (1997)									Luxury Tax
Dyna Super Glide	Harley Davidson Authorized Edition (1997)									Juneau
Jail	Sportster 1200 Sport	Sportster Custom	Chance	Sportster 883	Knucklehead	Income Tax	Sturgis, South Dakota	Community Chest	Daytona Beach, Florida	Go

Harley-Davidson Legendary Bikes Edition (2007)

Harley-Davidson Live to Ride Edition (2000)

Harry Potter Edition

Hasbro’s 100th Anniversary Edition

Heinz Edition (2002)

The Heirloom Edition

Here & Now Edition (2006, 2015)

Copyright date: 2006 & 2015	Released by: Parker Brothers/Hasbro	Issued through: General U.S. release

Game description: In April 2006, Hasbro launched a promotion through their monopoly.com website to select properties for a US version of the Here and Now Edition. The first Here and Now Edition of Monopoly had launched successfully in the UK in 2005. Like the UK edition, the US version has been updated for the twenty-first century, with higher property values and updated scenarios on the Chance cards and Community Chest cards. But unlike the UK edition, properties that appear on the US version were selected by visitors to monopoly.com, choosing one of three landmarks for each of twenty-two US cities. The voting lasted for three weeks. The landmark with the highest vote total per city is displayed on the final board, and the cities that received the most total votes have the highest property values, while those with the lowest total votes received the lowest property values. Thus New York City and Boston, Massachusetts have the dark blue properties, and Cleveland, Ohio and Dallas, Texas have the dark purple properties. The railroads became the four busiest airports in the US: Chicago's O'Hare International, Los Angeles International, New York City's John F. Kennedy International Airport, and Atlanta's Hartsfield-Jackson International Airport. The Income Tax space remained the same, though it becomes 10% or $2,000,000, but the Luxury Tax space changed to Interest on Credit Card Debt: Pay $750,000. The Electric Company became Cell Phone Service and the Water Works became Internet Service.
Tokens: There are eight pewter tokens: a laptop, a labradoodle, a jet plane, a Motorola RAZR phone, a New Balance running shoe, a Toyota Prius, a cup of Starbucks coffee and a container of McDonald's french fries.
Other features: A two-page document about the voting process and protests by cities which were not included as candidates for the final board is included with the game, particularly that by Atlantic City, New Jersey, which remains the setting of the US Standard Edition and the Mega Edition. Houses and hotels retained their familiar shapes, but became blue and silver plastic, respectively. Similarly, the tops of the Community Chest and Chance cards are no longer yellow and orange, but became blue and silver, respectively.

Here & Now: The World Edition

Copyright date: 2008

Free Parking	Sydney; 2.2M	Chance	New York City; 2.2M	London; 2.4M	Monopoly Cruise	Beijing; 2.6M	Hong Kong; 2.6M	Wind Energy	Jerusalem; 2.8M	Go To Jail
Vancouver; 2M	Here & Now: The World Edition									Paris; 3M
Shanghai; 1.8M	Here & Now: The World Edition									Belgrade; 3M
Community Chest	Here & Now: The World Edition									Community Chest
Rome; 1.8M	Here & Now: The World Edition									Cape Town; 3.2M
Monopoly Air	Here & Now: The World Edition									Monopoly Space
Toronto; 1.6M	Here & Now: The World Edition									Chance
Kyiv; 1.4M	Here & Now: The World Edition									Riga; 3.5M
Solar Energy; 1.5M	Here & Now: The World Edition									Luxury Tax (pay 1M)
Istanbul; 1.4M	Here & Now: The World Edition									Montreal; 4M
In Jail/Just Visiting	Athens; 1.2M	Barcelona; 1M	Chance	Tokyo; 1M	Monopoly Rail	Income Tax (pay 2M)	Taipei; 600k	Community Chest	Gdynia; 600k	Go (collect 2M)

Other features: M equals million. Pay 2M equals Pay $2,000,000

Here & Now: The World Edition Collector's Edition

Hello Kitty Collector's Edition

The Hobbit: An Unexpected Journey edition

The Hobbit motion picture trilogy edition

Hollywood Edition

Horse Lover's Edition

House Divided – about the U.S. Elections

House of the Dragon edition

House Rules

Copyright date: 2014

Other features: Added 5 new option rules from house rules selected by voters on Facebook. The five rules are:
- Frozen assets: While in jail, a player do not collect rent.
- Dash for the Cash: Landing on Go doubles the amount to $400.
- Free Parking, fast cash: Collect all taxes and fees if you land on free parking.
- See the sights: Properties may only be purchased after a player fully rounds the board.
- Lucky Roller: Rolling double ones, or snake eyes, get a player $500.

How to Train Your Dragon edition

HP Supply Chain Edition (2005)

Hull Edition

== I ==
Iditarod Edition

I Love Lucy Edition

I Love Lucy 50th Anniversary Collector's Edition

I Love Lucy California Here We Come Edition

Inflatable Edition

Indiana Jones Edition

Iron Maiden Edition

Iron Mountain Edition

It Edition

It Edition (GameStop Exclusive)

== J ==
Jackpot Edition

Jay and Silent Bob Strike Back Collector's Edition

John Wayne Collector's Edition

Joplin, Missouri Edition

Jujutsu Kaisen Edition

Junior Edition

Junior: Bluey Edition

Junior: Super Mario Edition

Jurassic Park Edition

Jurassic World Edition (Solid Blue Front)

Jurassic World Edition (Three Claw Marks)

Juicy Couture Edition

Justice League of America Collector's Edition (1999, 2002)

== K ==
KISS-opoly

Klingon Collector's Edition

Klingon Limited Edition

Monopoly [KFC edition] collector edition

[Monopoly knockout]

== L ==
The Legend of Zelda Edition

Copyright date: 2014	Released by: USAopoly under license from Hasbro; The Legend of Zelda elements licensed from Nintendo.	Issued through: General release

Free Parking	Gerudo Desert; 220 Rupees	Empty Bottle	Zora's Domain; 220 Rupees	Twilight Realm; 240 Rupees	King of Red Lions; 200 Rupees	Snowhead; 260 Rupees	Great Bay; 260 Rupees	Potion Shop; 150 Rupees	Clock Town; 280 Rupees	Go To Jail
Vaati's Palace; 200 Rupees	The Legend of Zelda Edition									Eldin Volcano; 300 Rupees
Death Mountain; 180 Rupees	The Legend of Zelda Edition									Faron Woods; 300 Rupees
Treasure Chest	The Legend of Zelda Edition									Treasure Chest
Four Swords Sanctuary; 180 Rupees	The Legend of Zelda Edition									Skyloft; 320 Rupees
Loftwing; 200 Rupees	The Legend of Zelda Edition									Epona; 200 Rupees
Dragon Roost Island; 160 Rupees	The Legend of Zelda Edition									Empty Bottle
Tower of the Gods; 140 Rupees	The Legend of Zelda Edition									Hyrule Castle; 350 Rupees
Bomb Shop; 150 Rupees	The Legend of Zelda Edition									Mask Merchant (pay 100 Rupees)
Forbidden Fortress; 140 Rupees	The Legend of Zelda Edition									Temple of Time; 400 Rupees
In Jail/Just Visiting	Lorule Castle; 120 Rupees	Sacred Realm; 100 Rupees	Empty Bottle	House of Gales; 100 Rupees	Spirit Train; 200 Rupees	Door Fee (pay 200 Rupees)	Minish Village; 60 Rupees	Treasure Chest	Elemental Sanctuary; 60 Rupees	Collect 200 Rupees Salary As You Pass Go

Game description: This board was released in 2014 and represents The Legend of Zelda video game franchise from Nintendo. The board features images of characters, items and locations from nearly all the Zelda video games. All of the paper currency has been renamed after the Zelda video games' currency Rupees. Properties are locations from the Zelda video games. Water Works is replaced by the Potion Shop and the Electric Company is now a Bomb Shop. The train stations have been changed to Link's methods of transport throughout the various games – Epona, the King of the Red Lions, Link's Loftwing and the Spirit Train. Community Chest have become Treasure Chest while Empty Bottle now represent Chance. The Income Tax is now a Door Fee and the Luxury Tax is now represented by the Mask Merchant. The plastic houses and hotels retained their usual shapes, but became "Deku Sprouts" and "Deku Trees" respectively.
Tokens: Five golden collector's tokens are included in all editions of the game: the Bow, the Hookshot, the Boomerang, the Triforce, and Hylian Shield. A sixth, exclusive golden token was included only in GameStop editions of the game: the Ocarina of Time.
Other features: Two editions of this game were released, a GameStop exclusive edition and a standard edition (available everywhere else). Besides having one exclusive token (already listed above) the GameStop edition also included some other exclusive items: an 11"x17" Hyrule Map Lithograph in Treasure Chest Holder and six Item Power Cards for added game play (Goddess Harp, Wind Waker, Minish Cap, Spirit Flute, Phantom Hourglass and Ocarina of Time).

The Legend of Zelda Edition (GameStop)

Lilly Pulitzer Edition

Lilo & Stitch Edition (Hot Topic)

Limited Too Collector's Edition

Lionel Trains Collector's Edition - Postwar Era

The Little Mermaid Edition

Littlest Pet Shop Edition (2007, 2008)

Loganopoly

Longest Game Ever

Looney Tunes Edition (1999, 2000)

Looney Tunes Collector's Edition (2003)

Looney Tunes: Official Classic Cartoon Edition

Copyright date: 1999	Released by: Parker Brothers/Hasbro	Issued through: Warner Brothers Studio Store

Free Parking	Bugs Bunny	What's Up Doc?	She Devil	Tasmanian Devil	Wile E. Delivery	Marvin The Martian	Daffy Duck	Acme Pipeline	Porky Pig	Go To Jail
Sylvester	Looney Tunes: Official Classic Cartoon Edition									Elmer Fudd
Granny	Looney Tunes: Official Classic Cartoon Edition									Bugs Bunny
That's All Folks!	Looney Tunes: Official Classic Cartoon Edition									That's All Folks!
Tweety	Looney Tunes: Official Classic Cartoon Edition									Daffy Duck
Marvin The Martian's Taxi	Looney Tunes: Official Classic Cartoon Edition									Rocket Airlines
Miss Prissy	Looney Tunes: Official Classic Cartoon Edition									What's Up Doc?
Mandrake	Looney Tunes: Official Classic Cartoon Edition									Wile E. Coyote
Acme Power	Looney Tunes: Official Classic Cartoon Edition									Carrot Tax
Foghorn Leghorn	Looney Tunes: Official Classic Cartoon Edition									Road Runner
In Jail/Just Visiting	Hippety Hopper	Sylvester	What's Up Doc?	Sylvester Jr.	Witch Hazel's Shuttle	Gravity Tax	Michigan J. Frog	That's All Folks!	Construction Worker	Go

Game description: This was a numbered, limited edition board. Properties bear the names of actual Looney Tunes cartoons and characters. Currency was denominated as laughs (1 laugh, 5 laughs, 10 laughs, etc.). Orange "What's Up, Doc?" cards replaced Chance, and yellow "That's All Folks!" cards replaced Community Chest. Grey plastic television sets replaced houses, gold movie theaters replaced hotels. Set also comes with a pewter Looney Tunes Trophy which can be awarded to the winner.
Tokens: Eight pewter tokens: Bugs Bunny, Marvin the Martian, Road Runner, Tasmanian Devil, Sylvester, Tweety Pie, Daffy Duck and Wile E. Coyote.
Other features: Rule variation: doubles take on extra meanings, or Looney Tunes effects. Extra tasks can be carried out depending on the value of the dice roll (double ones, double twos, etc.).

L.O.L. Surprise Edition

The Lord of the Rings Collector's Edition

The Lord of the Rings Trilogy Edition (2003, 2012)

The Lord of the Rings Edition (2021)

Luxury Edition

== M ==
Major League Baseball Edition

Major League Baseball Collector's Edition

Margaritaville Deluxe Edition

Marvel Comics Collector's Edition (1999, 2012)

Marvel Super Heroes Edition

Marshall Field's Edition (1997)

Copyright date: 1997	Released by: USAopoly, Inc. under license from Hasbro	Issued through: Marshall Field's stores

Free Parking	The Great Tree	Chance	Cozy Cloud Cottage	Uncle Mistletoe	Ravenswood Line	Atrium Fountain	Tiffany Dome	Water Works	State Street Clock	Go To Jail
Fashions Of The Hour	Marshall Field's Edition (1997)									English Room
28 Shop	Marshall Field's Edition (1997)									Hinky Dink's
Community Chest	Marshall Field's Edition (1997)									Community Chest
Charlie's Door	Marshall Field's Edition (1997)									Walnut Room
Lake/Dan Ryan Line	Marshall Field's Edition (1997)									Evanston Express
Flowering Field's	Marshall Field's Edition (1997)									Chance
Crest	Marshall Field's Edition (1997)									Frango
Electric Company	Marshall Field's Edition (1997)									Luxury Tax
Field's Afar	Marshall Field's Edition (1997)									111 No State Street
In Jail/Just Visiting	Trend House	Shopping Bag	Chance	Jingle Elves	Union Station	City Tax	Washington Avenue	Community Chest	Randolph Avenue	Go

Game description: This edition is essentially a customized game board sold at Marshall Field's stores in 1997. The board itself consists of locations and items best known at the chain's flagship store (111 North State Street, Chicago, Illinois, USA): the Walnut Room, the English Room, the Tiffany Dome, the Atrium Fountain, etc. The railroads consist of three CTA rapid transit lines and one station. Community Chest, Chance, the Electric Company and Water Works remained unchanged, although the Community Chest and Chance cards were updated for the new property names. Currency bears the Marshall Field's logo and houses and hotels are the standard plastic green and red, respectively.
Tokens: The tokens are the same as in a U.S. standard edition set as of 1997: cannon, boot, thimble, wheelbarrow, car, horse and rider, dog, hat, battleship and iron.

Mass Effect N7 Collector's Edition

Metallica Edition

MCI Classic (1997)

Free Parking	Liberty Oak	Chance	Sea Pines Circle	Harbour Town Lighthouse	MCI Network One	Lanny Wadkins	Loren Roberts	Water Works	Arnold Palmer	Go To Jail
MCI Classic Pro-Am	MCI Classic (1997)									Sea Pines Resort
Pro-Am Draw Party	MCI Classic (1997)									The Heritage Classic Foundation
Community Chest	MCI Classic (1997)									Community Chest
Harbour Town Cup Pro-Am	MCI Classic (1997)									Bert C Roberts Jr
MCI Local Service	MCI Classic (1997)									MCI Prepaid
Closing Ceremonies	MCI Classic (1997)									Chance
The Heritage Plaid Jacket	MCI Classic (1997)									MCI
Electric Company	MCI Classic (1997)									Luxury Tax
Opening Ceremonies	MCI Classic (1997)									MCI Classic
Jail	Harbour Town Yacht Basin	South Carolina Low Country	Chance	Calibogue Sound	MCI Systemhouse	Income Tax	Harbour Town Golf Links	Community Chest	MCI Classic Volunteers	Go

M&M's Collector's Edition (2004, 2007, white rectangle ?)

Monopoly Junior (U.S. version)

Uncle Pennybag's Loose Change	Chance	Video Arcade $3	Haunted House $3	Chance	Blue Line Railway (Roll Again)	Helicopter Ride $4	Pony Ride $4	Pay $2 To See The Water Show	Chance	Pay $3 To Take The Bus To The Cafe
Mini Golf $3	Monopoly Junior (U.S. version)									Dodgems $4
Water Slide $3	Monopoly Junior (U.S. version)									Big Wheel $4
Green Line Railway (Roll Again)	Monopoly Junior (U.S. version)									Red Line Railway (Roll Again)
Paddle Boats $2	Monopoly Junior (U.S. version)									Loop The Loop $5
Merry-Go-Round $2	Monopoly Junior (U.S. version)									Roller Coaster $5
Cafe	Chance	Pay $2 To See The Fireworks	Magic Show $2	Puppet Show $2	Yellow Line Railway (Roll Again)	Chance	Candy Floss $1	Balloon Stand $1	Chance	Go (collect $2 pocket money)

Game description: A simplified version of the board game Monopoly, aimed at young children. It has a smaller, rectangular board and instead of being based on street names it is based on a funfair, to make it more child-friendly.
Other features: There are different versions of the game, such as Dig'n Dinos, a Disney Channel version, and a Canadian version. In the Canadian version Cafe is Lunch and Uncle Pennybags is Mr. Monopoly.
Image at unclesgames.com

Michael Graves Edition (Target)

Michael Graves Design Edition

Copyright date: 2002	Released by: Parker Brothers/Hasbro	Issued through: Target stores

Game description: This is a special edition of the standard U.S. Atlantic City board and properties. The set comes in a hardwood case, which can be folded out. A drawer in the front of the case holds the money, cards, tokens, houses and hotels. The houses and hotels feature new designs, and come in light blue and red, instead of the standard green and red.
Tokens: Tokens

Mayberry Edition

Metallica Collector's Edition

Metallica World Tour Edition (2022)

Mickey Mouse 75th Anniversary Edition

Copyright date: 2004	Released by: USAopoly under licenses from The Walt Disney Company and Hasbro	Issued through: General release

Game description: As part of Disney's 75th anniversary of Mickey Mouse, a special edition of Monopoly was released with properties being many of Mickey's famous cartoon appearances. Depicted cartoons include Steamboat Willie, The Band Concert, The Prince and the Pauper and Mickey's appearance in Fantasia. The four railroads are depicted by four television series: The Mickey Mouse Club, The Wonderful World of Disney, The Mouse Factory and House of Mouse. Community Chest and Chance became Original Mickey and Present Day Mickey respectively. The Income Tax space became Magic Broom Flood Damage, depicting a broom from The Sorcerer's Apprentice from Fantasia. The Luxury Tax space became Dog License, depicting Pluto. The Electric Company became Mickey Avenue on the Walt Disney Studios lot, and Water Works became Walt Disney Studios.
Tokens: Six pewter tokens are included: Mickey Mouse, Minnie Mouse, Donald Duck, Daisy Duck, Pluto and Goofy.

Millennials Edition

Millennium Edition (2000)

Millionaire Edition

Monopoly City Edition

Ms. Monopoly Edition

Muhammad Ali "The Greatest" Edition

The Muppets Collector's Edition (2003, 2010)

Mustang (Ford) Edition

Mustang (Ford) 40th Anniversary Edition (2004)

My American Idol Edition

My Fantasy Baseball Players Edition (2007)

My Fantasy Football Players Edition (2007)

My Hero Academia Edition

My Little Pony: Friendship Is Magic Edition

My Marvel Heroes Edition

My Monopoly Edition

My National Parks (2008)

My MLB Edition (2006)

My NBA Edition (2006)

My NFL Edition (2006)

My NHL Edition (2006)

Mega

== N ==
NASCAR 50th Anniversary Limited Collector's Edition (1998)

NASCAR Nextel Cup Series Collector's Edition (2005)

NASCAR Collector's Edition (2002)

NASCAR Winston Cup Series Collector's Edition (1997)

Free Parking	Circuit City	Chance	Parts America	Pennzoil	Charlotte Motor Speedway	Texaco	Tide	76 Official Fuel	Ford Quality Care	Go To Jail
The Family Channel	NASCAR Winston Cup Series Collector's Edition (1997)									Valvoline
Exide Batteries	NASCAR Winston Cup Series Collector's Edition (1997)									Kellogg's
Community Chest	NASCAR Winston Cup Series Collector's Edition (1997)									Community Chest
Interstate Batteries	NASCAR Winston Cup Series Collector's Edition (1997)									McDonald's
Talladega Superspeedway	NASCAR Winston Cup Series Collector's Edition (1997)									Daytona International Speedway
Kodak Gold Film	NASCAR Winston Cup Series Collector's Edition (1997)									Chance
QVC	NASCAR Winston Cup Series Collector's Edition (1997)									Du Pont
Bellsouth	NASCAR Winston Cup Series Collector's Edition (1997)									Luxury Suite
Bellsouth	NASCAR Winston Cup Series Collector's Edition (1997)									Goodwrench
Jail	Cartoon Network	Skittles	Chance	Lowe's Home Improvement	California Speedway	Black Flag	Caterpillar	Community Chest	First Union	Go

NASCAR Official Collector's Edition (1997)

National Geographic Mountaineering Edition (2001)

National Parks Edition (1996)

Free Parking	Dinosaur	Chance	Badlands	Agate Fossil Beds	Window Trail	Isle Royale	Acadia	Hot Springs	Padre Island	Go To Jail
Little Bighorn	National Parks Edition (1996)									Everglades
Gettysburg	National Parks Edition (1996)									Great Smoky Mountains
Community Chest	National Parks Edition (1996)									Community Chest
Valley Forge	National Parks Edition (1996)									Olympic
Limberlost Trail	National Parks Edition (1996)									Chilkot Trail
Hawaii Volcanoes	National Parks Edition (1996)									Chance
Grand Canyon	National Parks Edition (1996)									Yosemite
Edison	National Parks Edition (1996)									Luxury Tax
Glacier Bay	National Parks Edition (1996)									Yellowstone
Jail	Canyon De Chelly	Petroglyph	Chance	Mesa Verde	Flattop Mountain Trail	Income Tax	Mount Rushmore	Community Chest	National Mall	Go

National Parks Edition (1998)

National Parks Edition (2001)

National Parks Edition (2010)

National Parks Edition (2014)

National Parks Special Edition (2020)

NFL Collector's Edition (2003)

NFL Limited 1999 Grid Iron Edition (1999)

NFL Official Limited Collector's Edition (1998)

Free Parking	Tennessee Oilers	AFC	Washington Redskins	New York Jets	Dolphins vs Lions	Minnesota Vikings	New England Patriots	Television	Tampa Bay Buccaneers	Go To Jail
Seattle Seahawks	NFL Official Limited Collector's Edition (1998)									New York Giants
Carolina Panthers	NFL Official Limited Collector's Edition (1998)									Jacksonville Jaguars
NFC	NFL Official Limited Collector's Edition (1998)									NFC
Cincinnati Bengals	NFL Official Limited Collector's Edition (1998)									Pittsburgh Steelers
Eagles vs Falcons	NFL Official Limited Collector's Edition (1998)									Chiefs vs 49ers
Baltimore Ravens	NFL Official Limited Collector's Edition (1998)									AFC
Buffalo Bills	NFL Official Limited Collector's Edition (1998)									Green Bay Packers
Radio	NFL Official Limited Collector's Edition (1998)									Luxury Box
Dallas Cowboys	NFL Official Limited Collector's Edition (1998)									Denver Broncos
Jail	New Orleans Saints	St. Louis Rams	AFC	Chicago Bears	Chargers vs Raiders	Exceed Salary Cap	Arizona Cardinals	NFC	Indianapolis Colts	Go

Tokens: The Quarterback, The Football, The Helmet, The Referee, The Shoe, Pennybags, The Runningback, The Defensive

NHL Collector's Edition (1999)

NHL Original Six Collector's Edition (2001, 2008)

The National Trust Edition (2009)

Copyright date: 2009	Released by: Parker

Free Parking	Powis Castle and Garden	Chance	Stourhead	Sissinghurst Castle Garden	Studland Beach	Blickling Hall	Knole	Farmer's Market	Cragside	Go To Jail
Ightham Mote	The National Trust Edition (2009)									High Peak Estate
Little Moreton Hall	The National Trust Edition (2009)									Giant's Causeway
Community Chest	The National Trust Edition (2009)									Community Chest
Baddesley Clinton	The National Trust Edition (2009)									Snowdonia
Blakeney National Nature Reserve	The National Trust Edition (2009)									Strangford Lough
Souter Lighthouse	The National Trust Edition (2009)									Chance
Ham House	The National Trust Edition (2009)									Hardwick Hall
National Trust Green Energy	The National Trust Edition (2009)									National Trust Insurance
Chartwell	The National Trust Edition (2009)									Lyme Park
Jail	The Workhouse Southwell	Cornish Mines and Engines	Chance	Quarry Bank Mill	Woolacombe	National Trust Books	Birmingham Back to Backs	Community Chest	20 Forthlin Road	Go

Game description: Released in September 2009 to raise money for the National Trust, the properties are replaced by National-Trust-owned sites around the United Kingdom.

Night Sky Edition (2004)

Night Sky Solar System Edition (2010)

The Nightmare Before Christmas Edition

The Nightmare Before Christmas: Collector's Edition

The Nightmare Before Christmas: Hot Topic Exclusive Edition

The Nightmare Before Christmas: 25 Years Edition

Nintendo Collector's Edition (2006)

Copyright date: 2006	Released by: USAopoly under license from Hasbro	Issued through: General release

Free Parking	Toad $220	? Block	Princess Peach $220	Yoshi $240	Warp Star $200	Dixie Kong $260	Diddy Kong $260	Warp Pipe $150	Donkey Kong $280	Go To Jail
Samus Aran $200	Nintendo Collector's Edition (2006)									Ganondorf $300
Ridley $180	Nintendo Collector's Edition (2006)									Princess Zelda $300
Coin Block	Nintendo Collector's Edition (2006)									Coin Block
Metroid $180	Nintendo Collector's Edition (2006)									Link $320
Blue Falcon $200	Nintendo Collector's Edition (2006)									Arwing $200
Kirby $160	Nintendo Collector's Edition (2006)									? Block
King Dedede $140	Nintendo Collector's Edition (2006)									Luigi $350
Piranha Plant $150	Nintendo Collector's Edition (2006)									Treasure Chest Deposit (pay $75)
Meta Knight $140	Nintendo Collector's Edition (2006)									Mario $400
In Jail/Just Visiting	Fox McCloud $120	Falco Lombardi $100	? Block	Slippy Toad $100	Mario Kart $200	1-Up Mushroom	Wario $60	Coin Block	Waluigi $60	Go

Game description: This Collector's Edition features characters from Nintendo's most popular franchises, including Mario, Metroid, and Zelda. The property spaces are replaced with characters from the games. Each color set represents characters from the same series or game. For instance, the green spaces are Ganondorf, Princess Zelda, and Link from The Legend of Zelda. The four vehicles included in this edition are the go-kart from the Mario Kart series, Blue Falcon from F-Zero, Kirby's Warp Star and the Arwing from Star Fox. The board background is also made up of a huge number of screenshots of Nintendo games from all series, systems, and generations. The Chance and Community Chest cards are renamed Coin Block and ? Block cards, and the houses and hotels are called Power-Ups and Invincibilities.
Tokens: Six tokens: Koopa Shell, Mario's Hat, DK Barrel, NES controller, Hylian Shield, Iron Boots.

Nintendo Collector's Edition (2010)

Copyright date: 2010	Released by: USAopoly under license from Hasbro	Issued through: General release

Free Parking	Toad $220	? Block	Princess Peach $220	Yoshi $240	Pikmin Onion $200	Dixie Kong $260	Diddy Kong $260	Warp Pipe $150	Donkey Kong $280	Go To Jail
Samus Aran $200	Nintendo Collector's Edition (2010)									Midna $300
Ridley $180	Nintendo Collector's Edition (2010)									Princess Zelda $300
Block	Nintendo Collector's Edition (2010)									Block
Morph Ball $180	Nintendo Collector's Edition (2010)									Link $320
Gunship $200	Nintendo Collector's Edition (2010)									Epona $200
Kirby $160	Nintendo Collector's Edition (2010)									? Block
King Dedede $140	Nintendo Collector's Edition (2010)									Luigi $350
Piranha Plant $150	Nintendo Collector's Edition (2010)									Treasure Chest Deposit (pay $100)
Meta Knight $140	Nintendo Collector's Edition (2010)									Mario $400
In Jail/Just Visiting	Tom Nook $120	K.K. Slider $100	? Block	Rosie the Cat $100	Mario Kart $200	1-Up Mushroom (pay $200)	Wario $60	Block	Waluigi $60	Go

Game description: This is the same as in the 2006 version but this time, the purple color group featuring Wario & Waluigi changed to brown, the light blue color group featured characters from Animal Crossing and three new vehicles in the respective vehicle spaces: Epona, Gunship and Pikmin Onion. The board background is made up of a huge number of characters.
Tokens: Six tokens: Mushroom, Starman, Samus's Power Helmet, Hocotate Ship, Master Sword, Gyroid.

Nintendo Collector's Edition (GameStop)

== O ==
The Office Collector's Edition

Offshore Engineering 40th Anniversary Collector's Edition

Olympic Games Edition (London 2012)

Olympic Games Centennial Edition (1996)

Free Parking	Rome (1960)	Chance	Tokyo (1964)	Mexico (1968)	Gymnastics	Munich (1972)	Montreal (1976)	Water Works	Moscow (1980)	Go To Jail
Melbourne (1956)	Olympic Games Centennial Edition (1996)									Los Angeles (1984)
Helsinki (1952)	Olympic Games Centennial Edition (1996)									Seoul (1988)
Community Chest	Olympic Games Centennial Edition (1996)									Community Chest
London (1948)	Olympic Games Centennial Edition (1996)									Barcelona (1992)
Basketball	Olympic Games Centennial Edition (1996)									Athletics
Berlin (1936)	Olympic Games Centennial Edition (1996)									Chance
Los Angeles (1932)	Olympic Games Centennial Edition (1996)									Athens (1896)
Electric Company	Olympic Games Centennial Edition (1996)									Luxury Tax
Amsterdam (1928)	Olympic Games Centennial Edition (1996)									Atlanta (1996)
Jail	Paris (1924)	Belgium (1920)	Chance	Stockholm (1912)	Cycling	Income Tax	London (1908)	Community Chest	St Louis (1904)	Go

One Piece Edition

Option One Mortgage Corporation Limited Edition (2000)

== P ==
Peanuts Edition

Peanuts Collector's Edition (2002, 2008, 2010)

Copyright date: 2002, 2008, and 2010	Released by: USAopoly under license from Hasbro. Peanuts design licensed from United Feature Syndicate, Inc.

Game description: This was a board released in 2002 to honor the comic strip Peanuts. The board features artwork by Charles M. Schulz; virtually all of the printed text on the box, the game board, the title deed, Chance and Community Chest cards, as well as the currency, is done in a style similar to the style Schulz used in writing out text in word balloons and thought balloons for his characters (this includes the four corner spaces, which rarely change for any licensed Monopoly game set). All of the currency features Snoopy: First Beagle on the Moon for the $1, as a frustrated writer in front of his typewriter for the $5, a golfer for the $10, a Beagle Scout for the $20, dressed in his Attorney outfit for the $50, the World War I flying ace on the $100 and Joe Cool on the $500. Properties are characters and situations from the strip's 50 year history: Peppermint Patty and Marcie are one of the dark purple properties, Schroeder is a light purple property, Suppertime! is a green property, and Flying Ace is one of the dark blue properties. Community Chest was changed to Pitcher's Mound and Chance became Psychiatric Booth, and the texts on their respective cards also reflect the theme. Houses were recolored brown, and have become nests. The Hotels stayed red, but have been renamed Dog Houses (as Snoopy's own dog house was shown to be red). The utilities became Bus Stop and French Café (instead of Electric Company and Water Works) and the tax spaces became No Valentine and Kite-Eating Tree (instead of Luxury Tax and Income Tax, though the spaces retained the usual rates). Railroads are replaced by holidays: Valentine's Day, Thanksgiving Day, Christmas and Halloween.
Tokens: Six pewter collector's tokens are included: Snoopy sleeping on top of his dog house, Snoopy's supper dish, Woodstock, a football on a kicking tee, Schroeder's piano, and Lucy's psychiatric booth.

Pedigree Dog Lover's Edition

Pennsylvania State University Edition (Penn State-opoly)

Copyright date: 2004	Released by: Late For the Sky Production Company under license from Penn State University

Spring Break	Rec Hall $210	Contingency	The Obelisk $210	The Mall $230	North Halls $250	Penn State Blue Band $250	Bryce Jordan Center $250	The Creamery $175	Mount Nittany $270	Academic Probation
Ye Olde College Diner $190	Pennsylvania State University Edition (Penn State-opoly)									Beaver Stadium $290
Student Book Store $170	Pennsylvania State University Edition (Penn State-opoly)									The HUB $290
Campus Mail	Pennsylvania State University Edition (Penn State-opoly)									Campus Mail
Hi Way Pizza $170	Pennsylvania State University Edition (Penn State-opoly)									State College, Pennsylvania $310
West Halls $250	Pennsylvania State University Edition (Penn State-opoly)									East Halls $250
University Book Centre $150	Pennsylvania State University Edition (Penn State-opoly)									Pattee Library $375
The Phyrst $130	Pennsylvania State University Edition (Penn State-opoly)									Contingency
Nittany Lion Shrine $175	Pennsylvania State University Edition (Penn State-opoly)									Car Fine $75
McLanahan's $130	Pennsylvania State University Edition (Penn State-opoly)									Old Main $425
Home/On Break	The Rathskeller $110	The Wall $90	Contingency	College Avenue $90	South Halls $250	Increased Tuition; Pay $200	Dining Halls $80	Campus Mail	Parking Lot 80 $70	Register & Proceed

Game description: This edition was released in 2004 in time for Penn State University's 150th anniversary of its founding as The Farmers High School in 1855.
Tokens: Alarm clock, bicycle, football, Nittany Lion Shrine, slice of pizza

Phineas and Ferb Edition (2012)

Phenix City, Alabama Edition (2021)

Pirates of the Caribbean Collector's Edition (2006)

Copyright date: 2006	Released by: USAopoly under license from Parker Brothers/Hasbro; Pirates of the Caribbean elements licensed from Disney.	Issued through: General release

Game description: This edition of Monopoly was issued to coincide with the release of Pirates of the Caribbean: Dead Man's Chest. It features special pewter tokens, money, and deed cards to items featured in the film and its predecessor, Pirates of the Caribbean: The Curse of the Black Pearl. The Community Chest and Chance cards were replaced with Aztec Gold and Compass cards. Docks and Harbors were used in place of houses and hotels. Cursed Loot replaces the Income Tax space, various ships including the Interceptor, the Black Pearl, and the Flying Dutchman replace the railroads, and Davy Jones' chest and key replace the utilities. The printed money continues the movies' theme, printed to look like old cash certificates, but maintaining the usual colors for U.S. edition Monopoly money.
Tokens: Six pewter tokens which include the dog with the keys to the jail cell, Jack Sparrow's Compass, a pirate skull, Jack the Monkey, Davy Jones' Chest, and a cannon from the Black Pearl.

Pirates of the Caribbean: On Stranger Tides Collector's Edition (2011)

Pirates of the Caribbean: Trilogy Edition (2007)

Pirates of the Caribbean: Ultimate Edition

Pixar Edition

Pizza Edition (2018)

Playmaster Edition

Planet Earth Edition

Planet of the Apes Retro Art Edition

Pokémon Edition (1999)

Copyright date: 1999	Released by: Parker Brothers	Issued through: General release

Game description: The Pokémon edition is based on the Pokémon Red and Blue video games, with minor influences from the Pokémon anime. Each color group represents the eight Pokémon Gyms of the Kanto region, and each property represents a particular Pokémon used at the Gym. A player is said to have won the corresponding Gym Badge if they have all of the Pokémon in the gym. Poké Balls are used for the four railroads, while Articuno and Zapdos represents Water Works and the Electric Company, respectively. Gary Oak and Team Rocket represent Income Tax and Luxury Tax, respectively. Players earn Pokédollars (the currency of the games), which feature Ash Ketchum and Pikachu on each denomination. Houses are represented by Pokémon Centers, while Poké Marts take the place of hotels. Professor Oak takes the place of Chance cards, while Trainer Battles (represented by Ash Ketchum and Pikachu) take the place of Community Chest cards.
Tokens: The standard edition comes with six pewter tokens, representing Charmander, Meowth, Pikachu, Poliwhirl, Psyduck, and Snorlax. The collector's edition comes with six colored plastic tokens, representing Blastoise, Bulbasaur, Charmander, Clefairy, Mewtwo, and Pikachu.
Other features: An optional set of rules is featured that allow players to take special actions (Pokémon Powers) whenever doubles are rolled in lieu of taking an extra turn. They are as follows: moving to any space on the board (akin to Mewtwo's Teleport), collect an extra 200 Pokédollars (akin to Clefairy's Rest), collecting 50 Pokédollars from every player (akin to Bulbasaur's Leech Seed), drawing a Professor Oak card, drawing a Trainer Battle card, and attacking another Pokémon. When choosing to attack another Pokémon, the player names any Pokémon held by an opponent that is not part of a completed color group (except for Articuno and Zapdos). The player and the property's owner both roll the dice, with the player rolling the higher number keeping control of the Pokémon (any ties result in a re-roll).

Pokémon Edition (2001)

Copyright date: 2001	Released by: Parker Brothers	Issued through: General release

Game description: The Pokémon edition is based on the Pokémon Gold and Silver video games, with minor influences from the Pokémon anime. Like the previous edition, players earn Pokédollars, which feature Ash Ketchum and Pikachu on each denomination. Houses and hotels, as before, are represented by Pokémon Centers and Poké Marts. As before, each color group represent the eight Pokémon Gyms and each property represent the particular Pokémon used at the Gym, but are of the Johto region in this game (similarly, Professor Elm and not Professor Oak represents the Chance cards, while Ash Ketchum and Pikachu continue to represent the Community Chest cards, which are simply termed Ash cards in this game). Unlike the previous edition, the Zephyr and Hive Badges, the first two obtained in the video games, take the place of the utilities, while Chikorita, Cyndaquil, Totodile, and Heracross represent the four railroads. Gary Oak and Team Rocket represent Income Tax and Luxury Tax, respectively.
Tokens: The collector's edition comes with six colored plastic tokens, representing Bellossom, Chikorita, Cyndaquil, Marill, Pikachu, and Totodile.
Other features: The same optional rules from the 1999 edition are also featured in this edition. The Pokémon representing some of these powers have changed to reflect the second generation of Pokémon games (Hoppip instead of Mewtwo, Bellossom using Absorb instead of Clefairy using Rest, and Skiploom instead of Bulbasaur). The four Pokémon representing the railroads may not be named in an attack.

Pokémon Edition (2025)

Pokémon Kanto Edition (2014)

Pokémon Johto Edition (2016)

Pokémon Go Edition

Pottery Barn Deluxe Edition

Pottery Barn Heirloom Edition

Power Rangers 20th Anniversary Edition

Copyright date: 2013	Released by: USAopoly under license from Hasbro; Power Ranger elements licensed from Saban Brands.	Issued through: General release

Free Parking	Animarium $220	Allies (Magna Defender)	Dino Lab $220	Terra Venture $240	Rail Rescues $200	Hartford Mansion $260	Rootcore $260	Eternal Falls of Aquitar $150	Power Chamber $280	Go To Jail
Pai Zhuq Academy $200	Power Rangers 20th Anniversary Edition									The Shiba House $300
Wind Ninja Academy $180	Power Rangers 20th Anniversary Edition									Angel Grove Youth Center $300
Villains (Lord Zedd)	Power Rangers 20th Anniversary Edition									Villains (Vrak)
S.P.D. Academy $180	Power Rangers 20th Anniversary Edition									Dome City of Corinth $320
Strata Cycle $200	Power Rangers 20th Anniversary Edition									Battlefleet $200
Astro Megaship $160	Power Rangers 20th Anniversary Edition									Allies (Alpha 5)
Max Solarzord $140	Power Rangers 20th Anniversary Edition									Gosei's Command Center $350
The Morphin Grid $150	Power Rangers 20th Anniversary Edition									Weapon's Upgrade (Saba & Dragon Dagger) (pay $100)
Clock Tower $140	Power Rangers 20th Anniversary Edition									Zordon's Command Center $400
In Jail/Just Visiting	Rita Repulsa's Palace $120	Master Xandred's Ship $100	Allies (Tensou)	Warstar Ship $100	Phantom Ranger's Airship $200	Power Boost (pay $200)	Divatox's Ship $60	Villains (Rita Repulsa)	Dark Fortress $60	Collect $200 Salary As You Pass Go

Game description: This board was released in 2013 to honor the 20th Anniversary of the Power Rangers franchise. The board features photo images of characters, Zords, vehicles, weapons and locations from nearly every season of the show up to its 20th Anniversary. All of the paper currency features the iconic lightning bolt used in nearly every Power Rangers logo. Properties are Zords, vehicles and locations from the franchise's 20 year history. Water Works is replaced by the Eternal Falls of Aquitar and the Electric Company is now a metaphorical representation of the "Morphin Grid" that powers the Rangers' costumes and abilities. Villains from the show represent the Community Chest while Allies from the show represent Chance. The Income Tax is now a power boost and the Luxury Tax is now represented by a weapons upgrade. The plastic houses and hotels retained their usual shapes, but became red "Zords" and white "Megazords" respectively. The board also includes two traditional white Monopoly dice with black dots.
Tokens: Six zinc collector's tokens are included: Alpha 5, a Power Morpher, the White Ranger Helmet, a Lightning Bolt, the Megazord, and Goldar. Goldar was the winning candidate from a fan voting contest that was conducted on the official Power Rangers Facebook page. The two losing candidates for becoming a token were a pair of Ranger Boots and a Juice Cup.
Other features: A limited edition Power Rangers themed Monopoly dice was also created for use in conjunction with this board, but was offered separately. The dice is black and features both the show logo's iconic yellow lightning bolt and yellow dots as the dice's dots. This dice was given away at San Diego Comic-Con in 2013 and could also be won in a giveaway contest (along with other Power Rangers themed items) that was conducted on the official Power Rangers Facebook page. Later the dice, while previously advertised as being created for Monopoly during its giveaway offerings, would eventually see a retail release with a completely different board game. The dice was included with the game Trivial Pursuit – Power Rangers 20th Anniversary Edition.

The Powerpuff Girls Edition (2001)

Copyright date: 2001	Released by: Parker Brothers/Hasbro	Issued through: General release

Game description: This edition of Monopoly was based on the Cartoon Network series of the same name. The box lid is made of a special reflective foil paper. The game board features locations from the series' fictional setting of The City of Townsville, illustrated with representative artwork. Community Chest and Chance are renamed into Forces of Evil and Hotline, respectively. The four railroads also become City of Townsville locations: Townsville Bank, Pokey Oaks School, The Mayor's Office and The Museum. The utilities are the Power Plant and the Water Tower. All of the currency features the face of The Mayor. This edition also features purple, stackable buildings in place of houses, and pink skyscrapers in place of hotels.
Tokens: Six full color plastic tokens were included: Blossom, Bubbles, Buttercup, The Mayor, Ms. Keane and Professor Utonium. In addition three cardboard punchout tokens are available, which can be used as regular playing tokens, or for a special rule variation. The three tokens represent Mojo Jojo, Fuzzy Lumpkins and Sedusa.
Other features: A special, optional set of rules was included for the three villain tokens. When using these rules, the three villains begin the game in Jail. Any of the three villain tokens can be moved from jail onto any property space (owned or unowned). If a villain token is moved onto an unowned property space, players who have enough money for the space can fight for it through rolls of the dice – the player with the highest dice roll wins the right to buy the property at its full printed value. If the villain was moved from jail to an owned property, the villain can prevent the owner from collecting rent. When another player (not the owner) lands on the occupied space, they must roll the dice. If a seven or higher is rolled, the villain is defeated and returned to jail, and no rent is owed. If a six or lower is rolled, the villain continues his/her/its occupation and rent is owed. If the owner lands on an occupied space, they too must roll – seven or higher returns the villain to jail, six or lower lets the villain token stay on that property. No penalty (or forced dice roll) is made if a villain token is moved onto a space already occupied by a player token.

Premier Communities Edition (2007)

Prizm FIFA World Cup 2026 Edition

Prizm NBA Edition

Prologis Industrial Real Estate Edition (2007)

== Q ==
Queen Edition (2017)

QVC Edition (1999)

== R ==
The Ren & Stimpy Edition

The Ren & Stimpy: Memories Edition

Revolution Edition

RIM (BlackBerry) 25th Anniversary Edition

Rick and Morty Edition

Road Trip Edition

Rolling Stones Collector's Edition

Rudolph the Red-Nosed Reindeer Collector's Edition (2005, 2012)

Rugrats Edition

RuPaul’s Drag Race Edition

Rustic Cuff Commemorative Edition

Roblox: 2022 Edition

Monopoly rivals

== S ==
Sailor Moon Edition

Copyright date: 2018	Released by: USAopoly under license from Hasbro	Issued through: General release

Free Parking	Sailor Venus $220	Friendship	Professor Tomoe $220	Sailor Pluto $240	Space Sword $200	Tuxedo Mask $260	Sailor Neptune $260	Spiral Heart Moon Rod $150	Sailor Uranus $280	Go To Jail
Sailor Jupiter $200	Sailor Moon Edition									Mistress 9 $300
Sailor Mars $180	Sailor Moon Edition									Sailor Saturn $300
Love	Sailor Moon Edition									Love
Sailor Mercury $180	Sailor Moon Edition									Sailor Moon $320
Deep Aqua Mirror $200	Sailor Moon Edition									Silence Glaive $200
Kaolinite $160	Sailor Moon Edition									Friendship
Sailor Chibi Moon $140	Sailor Moon Edition									King Endymion $350
Cosmic Heart Compact $150	Sailor Moon Edition									Attacked by Witches 5
Cyprine/Ptilol $140	Sailor Moon Edition									Neo Queen Serenity $400
In Jail/Just Visiting	Tellu $120	Viluy $100	Friendship	Eudial $100	Garnet Rod $200	Attacked by Death Busters	Mimete $60	Love	Luna & Artemis $60	Go

Game description: This edition is based on the S arc of the anime series.

Schnucksopoly

Scooby-Doo 50th Anniversary Edition

Scooby-Doo Collector's Edition

Scooby-Doo Fright Fest Edition

Scott the Woz Edition (2021)

Copyright date: 2021	Released by: USAopoly under license from Hasbro	Issued through: Pixel Empire

Free Parking	Midnight Launch Event $220	The Topic Wheel	"The Yearies" Studio $220	The Lesler Pumpkin Orchard $240	The Sewers $200	The Think Barrel $260	Homecoming Dance $260	Water Productions $150	Stale Pretzels $280	Go To Jail
Say That Answer! Studio $200	Scott the Woz Edition (2021)									The Litigation Station $300
Centennial Gala for Recent Murder Victims $180	Scott the Woz Edition (2021)									The Shaft Family Estate $300
Kay Swiss' Bank	Scott the Woz Edition (2021)									Kay Swiss' Bank
Critique That Leak! Studio $180	Scott the Woz Edition (2021)									Games on a Shelf $320
The '08 Mech $200	Scott the Woz Edition (2021)									"B-Movie" Ship $200
Vegan's Anonymous Gathering $160	Scott the Woz Edition (2021)									The Topic Wheel
Speed Dating for the Cure $140	Scott the Woz Edition (2021)									Blue Border Space Station $350
Styrofoam Productions $150	Scott the Woz Edition (2021)									Hospital Restraining Order (pay $100)
Desert Island $140	Scott the Woz Edition (2021)									New Location McGee $400
In Jail/Just Visiting	The Trailer Fix-o-tron $120	The Console Wargrounds $100	The Topic Wheel	Old Location McGee $100	"The Hour of Variety" Ship $200	Tax Evasion Fee (pay $200)	The Post-Apocolypse $60	Kay Swiss' Bank	Purgatory $60	Go

Game description: This is a special edition based on the video game-centric variety show Scott the Woz; it was produced in limited quantities as part of the Scott The Woz Merchandise for Charity Bonanza 2021 fundraiser event. Houses and Hotels have been renamed "Shelves" and "Desks." Custom-themed money is included, renamed as "V-Cards." Community Chest and Chance Cards have been renamed "Kay Swiss' Bank Cards" and "The Topic Wheel Cards," respectively. Text and images have been changed to reflect the theme. There is a slight error on the money. The character Wendy's Employee was intended to be renamed to "The Employee" to avoid copyright. However, the $50 note, which features the character, is misspelled as "The Empolyee."
Tokens: Six unique tokens are included: "The Internet and You" VHS Tape, '08 Stack, Old Phone, Nostalgia Goggles, Party Hat, and Tambourine.

SeaWorld Wildlife Conservation Edition (2013)

Seinfeld Collector's Edition (2009)

Sephora: The Beauty Authority Edition (2006)

Sesame Street 35 Years Edition (2004)

Seventieth 70th Anniversary Edition (Collector's Tin)

Copyright date: 2005	Released by: Parker Brothers/Hasbro	Issued through: General release

Game description: This anniversary edition came in a silver colored collector's tin with an outer plastic cover. Some copies came with a card, imprinted with a code, which could be used for a special anniversary contest: the chance to win US $15,140, which is the total amount of money included in every U.S. Monopoly game. The board is foil-wrapped, and the center artwork is done in a 1930s-art deco style, as are the playing tokens, houses and hotels. The currency and cards are also imprinted with a special art deco/70th anniversary motif.
Tokens: These are chrome-plated art-deco renderings of standard tokens: A dog, a speedboat, a locomotive, a ladies' high-heeled shoe, a wheelbarrow, an iron, a tophat, a thimble, a sportscar, a sack of money, a cannon and a horse with rider.
Other features: Each of the twelve hotels has a unique design, and the thirty-two houses come in four distinct styles.

Shark Week: Predators of the Deep Edition

Sheraton Edition

Shrek Collector's Edition

Sigma Chi Limited Edition

The Simpsons Edition (2001)

Copyright date: 2001	Released by: USAopoly under license from Hasbro	Issued through: General release

Free Parking	Ye Olde Off Ramp Inn $220	Chance	Rancho Relaxo $220	Sleep Eazy Motel $240	Shelbyville Express $200	The Frying Dutchman $260	The Happy Sumo $260	Springfield Dam Hydroelectric Company $150	The Gilded Truffle $280	Go To Jail
Barneys Bowl-a-Rama $200	The Simpsons Edition (2001)									Duff Gardens $300
Sir Putt-a-Lots $180	The Simpsons Edition (2001)									Itchy and Scratchy Land $300
Community Chest	The Simpsons Edition (2001)									Community Chest
Noiseland Video Arcade $180	The Simpsons Edition (2001)									Krustylu Studios $320
Springfield Station $200	The Simpsons Edition (2001)									Ogdenville Express $200
Disco Stu's $160	The Simpsons Edition (2001)									Chance
The Jazz Hole $140	The Simpsons Edition (2001)									Springfield Glen Country Club $350
Springfield Nuclear Power Plant $150	The Simpsons Edition (2001)									First Church of Springfield Offering Plate (pay $100)
Moe's Bar $140	The Simpsons Edition (2001)									Burns Manor $400
In Jail/Just Visiting	Kwik-E-Mart $120	The Androids Dungeon $100	Chance	Hermans Military Antiques $100	North Haverbrook Express $200	Legitimate Business men's Protection Tax (pay $200)	Cletus' Shack $60	Community Chest	Tire Yard $60	Go (collect $200)

Game description: This is a special The Simpsons edition. The properties were replaced by landmarks such as Moe's Tavern and Mr. Burns Mansion, and every single card has been changed to reflect the theme.
Tokens: Eight tokens are included: The Springfield school bus, a donut, Homer, Bart in a Car, Jebediah Springfield, Kang the Alien, Blinky the Fish, and Santa's Little Helper.

The Simpsons Electronic Banking Edition (2009)

The Simpsons: Treehouse of Horror Edition (2005)

Skylanders Edition

The Smurfs Collector's Edition

Snap-on Collector's Edition (2000)

Snoopy: It's a Dog's Life Collector's Edition

Game description: Chance and Community Chest have been replaced by Lucy's Psychiatric Booth and Pitcher's Mound. Properties are some of Snoopy's favorite possessions.
Tokens: Snoopy, Charlie Brown, and others.

Snowboarding Edition

Copyright date: 2004	Released by: Parker Brothers/Hasbro	Issued through: General release

Free Parking	Telluride	Halfpipe	Park City; Mountain Resort	Heavenly	Quiksilver	Kirkwood	Okemo	Snowbarder Magazine	Vail	Go To Jail
Timberline	Snowboarding Edition									Copper Mountain
Aspen/Snowmass	Snowboarding Edition									Mount Snow
Terrain Park	Snowboarding Edition									Terrain Park
Snowbird	Snowboarding Edition									Breckenridge
DC Shoes	Snowboarding Edition									Ride Snowboards
The Canyons	Snowboarding Edition									Halfpipe
Northstar at Tahoe	Snowboarding Edition									Mammoth
Transworld Snowboarding Magazine	Snowboarding Edition									Lift Tickets
Steamboat	Snowboarding Edition									Whistler Blackcomb
In Jail/Just Visiting	Stratton	Bear Mountain	Halfpipe	Mt. Baker	Oakley	Hit a Kink!	Brighton	Terrain Park	Angel Fire	Go

Game description: GO BIG! It's a snowboarder's dream to shred North America's best runs and terrain parks, but what if you owned them? Here is your chance to buy, sell and trade the top 22 snowboarding destinations! Buy Whistler Blackcomb, Park City Mountain Resort and Breckenridge! Sell Aspen, Mammoth and Stratton! Trade Timberline, Vail or Mt. Baker! Own them all in the Snowboarding edition of the MONOPOLY game. If you love to carve or ride park, this game provides an unreal experience that you won't want to miss out on. Grab your board, boots and goggles and get ready for the ride of your life!
Tokens: Six custom pewter tokens: Snowboarder, Goggles, Gloves, DC Shoes, Rachet, and Helmet.

Socialism Edition

Sonic the Hedgehog Collector's Edition

Copyright date: 2012	Released by: USAopoly under license from Hasbro	Issued through: General release

Free Parking	Sand Ruins; 220 Rings	Badnik	Metal City; 220 Rings	Apotos; 240 Rings	Extreme Gear; 200 Rings	Holoska; 260 Rings	Empire City; 260 Rings	Team Babylon; 150 Rings	Sweet Mountain; 280 Rings	Go To Jail
Babylon Garden; 200 Rings	Sonic the Hedgehog Collector's Edition									Tropical Resort; 300 Rings
Green Hill; 180 Rings	Sonic the Hedgehog Collector's Edition									Planet Wisp; 300 Rings
Item Box	Sonic the Hedgehog Collector's Edition									Item Box
Chemical Plant; 180 Rings	Sonic the Hedgehog Collector's Edition									Sylvania Castle; 320 Rings
Tornado; 200 Rings	Sonic the Hedgehog Collector's Edition									Egg Mobile; 200 Rings
Sky Sanctuary; 160 Rings	Sonic the Hedgehog Collector's Edition									Badnik
Speed Highway; 140 Rings	Sonic the Hedgehog Collector's Edition									Splash Hill; 350 Rings
Team Chaotix; 150 Rings	Sonic the Hedgehog Collector's Edition									Gift Expense (pay 100 Rings)
Seaside Hill; 140 Rings	Sonic the Hedgehog Collector's Edition									Mad Gear; 400 Rings
In Jail/Just Visiting	Frog Forest; 120 Rings	Mystic Mansion; 100 Rings	Badnik	City Escape; 100 Rings	Speed Star; 200 Rings	Dr. Eggman Steals Rings (pay 200 Rings)	Metal Harbor; 60 Rings	Item Box	Pumpkin Hill; 60 Rings	Go (collect 200 Rings)

Game description: This edition is inspired by the popular Sega video game franchise featuring all of the locations and characters from various games including Sonic Riders and Sonic Heroes. The money in this edition uses Rings (the currency used during the series). The Chance and Community Chest cards are renamed Item Box and Badnik cards, and the houses and hotels are called Bases and Workshops.
Tokens: Sonic the Hedgehog, Shadow the Hedgehog, Tails, Amy Rose, Knuckles, and a Chao.

South Park Collector's Edition

Space (2020)

Space Jam: A New Legacy Edition

Spider-Man Edition

Spider-Man Collector's Edition (2002, 2012)

SpongeBob SquarePants Edition (2005, 2010)

Copyright date: 2005 and 2010	Released by: Parker Brothers/Hasbro	Issued through: General release

Free Parking	Palace of Pranks	Life Preserver	Grandma's House	Mrs. Puff's Boating School	Monster Truck Rentals	Snailpo World Headquarters	Mr. Krab's Anchor House	Bikini Bottom Water	Oyster Stadium	Go to Jail
Tentacle Acres	SpongeBob SquarePants Edition (2005, 2010)									Sandy's Treedome
Tough Tavern	SpongeBob SquarePants Edition (2005, 2010)									Mermalair
Treasure Chest	SpongeBob SquarePants Edition (2005, 2010)									Treasure Chest
Bikini Bottom Hospital	SpongeBob SquarePants Edition (2005, 2010)									Squidward's Island Tiki House
Bikini Bottom Bike Tours	SpongeBob SquarePants Edition (2005, 2010)									Mrs. Puff's Training Boat
Barg'N Mart	SpongeBob SquarePants Edition (2005, 2010)									Life Preserver
Salty Spitoon	SpongeBob SquarePants Edition (2005, 2010)									SpongeBob's Pineapple
Bikini Bottom Electric	SpongeBob SquarePants Edition (2005, 2010)									Employee of the Month Tax
Flying Dutchman's Ship	SpongeBob SquarePants Edition (2005, 2010)									Krusty Krab
In Jail/Just Visiting	Weenie Hut Jr.	Snack Bar	Life Preserver	Patrick's Rock	Anchovies Bus	Bubble Tax	Chum Bucket	Treasure Chest	Plankton's Lab	Go (collect $200)

Game description: This game is for two to six players and uses the same rules as the normal version of Monopoly. The game's rulebook details an optional quicker way to play using an including coin which depicts Plankton. This is inspired by the hit Nickelodeon animated comedy series created by Stephen Hillenburg.
Tokens: The main playing tokens depict SpongeBob holding a jellyfishing net, Sandy out of her suit, Patrick happily saluting with his hand, Squidward with his hands on his hips, Mr. Krabs standing on a pile of coins with a few in his hand, and Gary wearing shoes. A pewter coin depicting Plankton on both sides is also included for use with a special method of gameplay.
Other features: Instead of the traditional red hotels and green houses made of wood, the game uses red models of the Krusty Krab and yellow models of SpongeBob's Pineapple made of plastic for hotels and houses respectively. The currency for the game is referred to as clams instead of dollars and features the same values and colors of each bill as the classic Monopoly game, but the bills have a SpongeBob-style design, featuring a picture of Mr. Krabs in the center and the number value of the bill on either side of him in the middle of an old ship steering wheel. The top of the box for this game shows the top of SpongeBob's face, and the pupils of his eyes appear to move when the box is tilted.

Star Trek Limited Edition

Copyright date: 1998	Released by: USAopoly/Hasbro	Issued through: General release

Free Parking	Kentucky Avenue $220	Chance	Indiana Avenue $220	Illinois Avenue $240	B&O Railroad $200	Atlantic Avenue $260	Ventnor Avenue $260	Water Works $150	Marvin Gardens $280	Go To Jail
New York Avenue $200	Star Trek Limited Edition									Pacific Avenue $300
Tennessee Avenue $180	Star Trek Limited Edition									North Carolina Avenue $300
Community Chest	Star Trek Limited Edition									Community Chest
St. James Place $180	Star Trek Limited Edition									Pennsylvania Avenue $320
Pennsylvania Railroad $200	Star Trek Limited Edition									Short Line $200
Virginia Avenue $160	Star Trek Limited Edition									Chance
States Avenue $140	Star Trek Limited Edition									Park Place $350
Electric Company $150	Star Trek Limited Edition									Luxury Tax (pay $100)
St. Charles Place $140	Star Trek Limited Edition									Boardwalk $400
In Jail/Just Visiting	Connecticut Avenue $120	Vermont Avenue $100	Chance	Oriental Avenue $100	Reading Railroad $200	Income Tax (pay $200)	Baltic Avenue $60	Community Chest	Mediterranean Avenue $60	Go

Game description: Second in a proposed series of four Star Trek Monopoly editions (see entry on TNG edition above), the game's elements drew heavily from the Original Series' three-season run (but not the Animated Series). The paper currency was made to be different values of Federation Credits, houses became Constitution-class Starships, hotels became Starbases, Community Chest and Chance became Starfleet Orders and Captain's Log, respectively, and the cards were changed to be scenarios from different episodes, complete with the respective episode's Stardate. The Electric Company became Engineering, and the Water Works became Replicator. The four railroads became other Constitution-class Starships: The Constellation, the Intrepid, the Potemkin and the Defiant. The property spaces became aliens or specific adversaries, such as the Gorn, Kor, Nomad, tribbles or the Keeper.
Tokens: Eight included tokens represented the characters of James T. Kirk, Spock, Leonard McCoy, Montgomery Scott, Hikaru Sulu, Nyota Uhura, Pavel Chekov and Christine Chapel. An included certificate allowed game owners to mail or fax USAopoly for two additional tokens, representing characters from the original Star Trek pilot The Cage: Christopher Pike and Number One.
Other features: A numbered Certificate of Authenticity was included, with two signatures. One was from Mr. Monopoly (the renamed Rich Uncle Pennybags), the fictional spokes-character of Monopoly, and the other was from William Shatner. The instructions booklet was titled Prime Directive, and it indicated that this edition was to be the second of four Star Trek themed games intended for release (though only one other, based on The Next Generation, was produced). If all four had been produced, they were intended to be linked in order to form a larger square board. (The instructions still give directions for playing with the boards from the two produced games.) Also included was an additional booklet, the U.S.S. Enterprise NCC-1701 Ship's Manifest/Alien Species Identification Guide. The booklet could be flipped so that one side or the other could be read.

Star Trek Continuum Edition

Star Trek: The Next Generation Collectors' Edition

Copyright date: 1998	Released by: USAopoly/Hasbro	Issued through: General release

Free Parking	Lore	Chance	The Traveler	Ardra	Shuttlecraft Feynman	Tamarian	Crystalline Entity	Replicator	J'Nai	Go To Jail
Gomtuu	Star Trek: The Next Generation Collectors' Edition									Human
Acamarian	Star Trek: The Next Generation Collectors' Edition									Cardassian
Community Chest	Star Trek: The Next Generation Collectors' Edition									Community Chest
Mintakan	Star Trek: The Next Generation Collectors' Edition									Takaran
Shuttlecraft Magellan	Star Trek: The Next Generation Collectors' Edition									Shuttlecraft Justman
Antedian	Star Trek: The Next Generation Collectors' Edition									Chance
Pakled	Star Trek: The Next Generation Collectors' Edition									Borg
Warp Core	Star Trek: The Next Generation Collectors' Edition									Luxury Tax
Allasomorphs	Star Trek: The Next Generation Collectors' Edition									Q
In Jail/Just Visiting	Armus	Bynars	Chance	Fanged Humanoid	Shuttlecraft Hawking	Income Tax	Ferengi	Community Chest	Farpoint Station	Go

Game description: First in a proposed series of four Star Trek Monopoly editions (only two were made; this and the Original Series edition listed below), the game's elements drew heavily from the series' seven-season run. The paper currency was made to be different values of gold-pressed latinum, houses became Galaxy-class Starships, hotels became Starbases, Community Chest and Chance became Starfleet Orders and Captain's Log, respectively, and the cards were changed to reflect scenarios from different episodes, complete with the respective episode's Stardate. The Electric Company became Warp Core, and the Water Works became Replicator. The four railroads became shuttlecraft of the Enterprise NCC-1701-D: Hawking, Magellan, Feynman and Justman. The property spaces became alien races or specific alien adversaries, such as the Ferengi, Bynars, Armus, the Borg or Q.
Tokens: Eight included tokens represented the characters of Jean-Luc Picard, William Riker, Data, Geordi La Forge, Worf, Beverly Crusher, Deanna Troi and Wesley Crusher. An included certificate allowed game owners to mail or fax USAopoly for four additional tokens, representing Tasha Yar, Katherine Pulaski, Miles Edward O'Brien and Guinan.
Other features: A numbered Certificate of Authenticity was included, with two signatures. One was from Rich Uncle Pennybags, the fictional spokes-character of Monopoly, and the other was from Majel Barrett Roddenberry. The instructions booklet was titled Prime Directive, and it indicated that this edition was to be the first of four Star Trek themed games intended for release (though only one other, based on the Original Series, was produced). If all four had been produced, they were intended to be linked in order to form a larger square board. Also included was an additional booklet, the U.S.S. Enterprise NCC-1701-D Ship's Manifest/Alien Species Identification Guide. The booklet could be flipped so that one side or the other could be read.

Star Wars 40th Anniversary Special Edition

Star Wars Edition (2018)

Star Wars Classic Trilogy Edition

Star Wars Dark Side Edition

Star Wars Episode 1 Edition (1999)

Star Wars Light Side Edition

Star Wars Saga Edition

Star Wars Limited Collector's Edition

Star Wars Open and Play Edition

Star Wars Original Trilogy Edition (1996)

Copyright date: 1996	Released by: Parker Brothers/Hasbro	Issued through: General release

Free Parking	Landing Platform	Imperial Cards	Carbon Freezing Chamber	Reactor Control Room	X-Wing Fighter	Throne Room	Central Core	Moisture Farm	Landing Bay	Go To Jail
Massassi Temple	Star Wars Original Trilogy Edition (1996)									Ewok Village
War Room	Star Wars Original Trilogy Edition (1996)									Forest
Rebel Cards	Star Wars Original Trilogy Edition (1996)									Rebel Cards
Temple Throne Room	Star Wars Original Trilogy Edition (1996)									Shield Generator
Millennium Falcon	Star Wars Original Trilogy Edition (1996)									Star Destroyer
Lars Homestead	Star Wars Original Trilogy Edition (1996)									Imperial Cards
Spaceport	Star Wars Original Trilogy Edition (1996)									Monument Square
Reactor Core	Star Wars Original Trilogy Edition (1996)									Bounty
Mos Eisley	Star Wars Original Trilogy Edition (1996)									Imperial Palace
In Jail/Just Visiting	Frozen Plains	Echo Base	Imperial Cards	North Ridge	Tie Fighter	Docking Tax	Swamp	Rebel Cards	Yoda's Hut	Go

Game description: To mark the 20th anniversary of the release of Star Wars Episode IV: A New Hope, two versions of Monopoly were released. One was a numbered, limited edition, which came with special Imperial Credit coins. The other (photographed here), was a general release. Paper currency in both editions are also printed as Imperial Credits – Coruscant, but use Aurebesh on the paper (as well as Arabic numerals – a translation guide to Aurebesh is printed on the back of the rules booklet). The game board features artwork and locations from Episodes IV-VI (the Classic Trilogy). Community Chest becomes Rebel Cards and Chance becomes Imperial Cards. The two tax spaces become Docking Tax (10% or 200 credits) and Bounty (75 credits). Some of the artwork (such as the photo stills used for the Tatooine spaces) comes from the 1997 Special Edition releases of the Classic Trilogy, whereas the illustration for the Imperial Palace comes from original concept artwork.
Tokens: Nine pewter tokens were included: Darth Vader, an Imperial stormtrooper, Emperor Palpatine, Boba Fett, Obi-Wan Kenobi, Luke Skywalker, C-3PO, Princess Leia Organa and Han Solo.
Other features: Houses and hotels are replaced by X-Wing fighters and Corellian freighters (if the player is using a token of one of the rebels) or by TIE fighters and Star Destroyers (if the player is using the token of one of the Imperials, which includes Boba Fett). However, by standard Monopoly rules, only thirty-two maximum X-Wings/TIE Fighters are allowed to be in use (in place of houses), as well as a maximum of twelve Corellian freighters/Star Destroyers (in place of hotels).

Star Wars Original Trilogy Edition (2004)

Copyright date: 2004	Released by: Parker Brothers/Hasbro	Issued through: General release

Game description: This edition is essentially a re-release of the Classic Trilogy edition, above. The board game artwork did not change, nor did the Title Deed cards, paper currency, or Rebel/Imperial cards (in place of Community Chest and Chance, respectively). The outer box artwork was changed, and the board in this edition is a quarter fold (as opposed to the half fold version in the Classic Trilogy edition).
Tokens: Eight pewter tokens were included: Darth Vader (in a new pose), Luke Skywalker (in a new pose), Obi-Wan Kenobi (in a new pose), R2-D2, Grand Moff Tarkin, Lando Calrissian, a TIE fighter pilot, and a Tusken Raider.
Other features: See details in the Classic Trilogy edition listing, above. Gameplay variants are unchanged between the two releases.

Star Wars The Clone Wars Edition

Star Wars The Complete Saga Edition

Star Wars: The Force Awakens edition

Steven Universe Edition

Stock Exchange Edition (2001)

Stranger Things Edition

Stranger Things Collector's Edition

Street Fighter Collector's Edition

Copyright date: 2012	Released by: USAopoly under license from Hasbro	Issued through: General release

Game description: This edition is inspired by the most popular fighting video game series published by Capcom. The gameboard includes characters and fighting arenas covering the series' 25th anniversary. Chance and Community Chest cards are renamed Bonus Stage and Random Select cards, and the houses and hotels are renamed Training Rooms and Dojos.
Tokens: Six pewter tokens were included: Ryu, M. Bison, Blanka, Vega's mask, Chun-Li's wrist cuff and a Hadouken.

Sun-Maid Edition

Super Bowl XXXII (1998)

Free Parking	Jet Flyover	Defence Cards	Opening Ceremonies	Coin Toss	Extra Point	Kickoff	Halftime Show	Water Works	Scoreboard	Go To Jail
Super Bowl Program	Super Bowl XXXII (1998)									Quarterback
Super Bowl Football	Super Bowl XXXII (1998)									Coach 1
Offense Cards	Super Bowl XXXII (1998)									Offense Cards
Super Bowl Ticket	Super Bowl XXXII (1998)									Coach 2
Field Goal	Super Bowl XXXII (1998)									Touchdown
Denver Broncos	Super Bowl XXXII (1998)									Defence Cards
Broncos' Cheerleaders	Super Bowl XXXII (1998)									Lombardi Trophy
Electric Company	Super Bowl XXXII (1998)									Luxury Tax
Broncos' Mascot	Super Bowl XXXII (1998)									Super Bowl Champions
Jail	Qualcomm Stadium	Mile High Salute	Defence Cards	Broncos' Fans	Safety	Stadium Tax	AFC Conference Champions	Offense Cards	NFC Conference Champions	Go

STV 100 Years Edition

Sun-Maid Collector's Edition

Sunterra Edition

Super Electronic Banking

Super Mario Celebration!

Super Mario Bros. Collector's Edition

The Super Mario Bros. Movie Edition

The Super Mario Galaxy Movie Edition

Superman Returns Collector's Edition

Supernatural Edition

Surfing Edition

[Signature token edition]

[Signature collection]

== T ==
Target Edition (2007, 2021)

Team Fortress 2 Edition

Teenage Mutant Ninja Turtles Edition

Teenage Mutant Ninja Turtles Collector's Edition

Teenage Mutant Ninja Turtles: Mutant Mayhem Edition

The Three Stooges Collector's Edition

Thunderbird 50th Anniversary Edition (2005)

Today Edition

Tommy Bahama 20th Anniversary Edition

Transformers Collector's Edition (2007, 2009)

Copyright date: 2007 and 2009	Released by: USAopoly, under license by Hasbro	Issued through: General retail

Game description: To help promote the release of the new Transformers live action film, Hasbro created a special board based on Generation 1 continuity. Chance and Community Chest cards have been replaced by Autobot and Decepticon cards, and require a card scanner to read them, much like the old tech specs on the back of Generation 1 packaging. Energon cubes and Anti-Matter replace houses and hotels, and new rules have been added for additional gameplay.
Tokens: 6 tokens are included, with each one based upon their appearances in Generation 1: Optimus Prime, Megatron, Starscream, Jazz, Bumblebee, and Soundwave.

Transformers Deluxe Collector's Edition

Transformers Edition

Tropical Tycoon DVD Game Edition

Trump Entertainment Resorts Collector's Edition

Toy Story Edition

Toys "R" Us 50th Anniversary Edition – Monopoly Deluxe Edition

Copyright date: 1995	Released by: Parker Brothers/Hasbro	Issued through: Toys "R" Us stores exclusive

Game description: To mark the 50th Anniversary of the Toys "R" Us toy store chain, its parent company released an exclusive Monopoly Deluxe Edition set. These are standard U.S. Deluxe Edition games, with the exceptions being the plastic sleeve having the 50 Years Forever Fun logo, and a different set of pewter tokens inside the box, replacing the regular Deluxe Edition tokens. A pewter medallion with the Toys "R" Us mascot, Geoffrey the Giraffe, was also included, to be placed in the center of the rotatable Title Deed card holder.
Tokens: Ten pewter tokens were included, nine of which represent popular toys by Hasbro, sold within Toys "R" Us stores. They are: Mr. Potato Head, G.I. Joe, Rich Uncle Pennybags (shortly before he was renamed Mr. Monopoly), an Easy-Bake Oven, a Tinkertoy, a log cabin made of Lincoln Logs, a can of Play-Doh, a Nerf football on a kickstand, and a Tonka dump truck. The tenth token is a bust of Toys "R" Us mascot Geoffrey the Giraffe.

Toys "R" Us Times Square Edition (2001)

== U ==
U-Build Edition

U.S. Air Force Edition (2003)

U.S. Coast Guard Edition (2006)

U.S. Marines Edition (2005)

Copyright date: 2005	Released by: Parker Brothers/Hasbro	Issued through: General release

Free Parking	EA-6B Prowler $220	Eagle, Globe, and Anchor	F/A-18D Hornet	AV-8B Harrier II	3rd Marine Division $200	Light Armored Vehicle (LAV) $260	Assault Amphibious Vehicle $260	PT $150	HMMWV $280	Go To Jail
TOW Missile Launcher $200	U.S. Marines Edition (2005)									UH-1N Huey Helicopter $300
AGM-114 Hellfire Missile $180	U.S. Marines Edition (2005)									AH-1W Super Cobra Helicopter $300
Iwo Jima	U.S. Marines Edition (2005)									Iwo Jima
AIM-7 Sparrow III Missile $180	U.S. Marines Edition (2005)									CH-46 Sea Knight Helicopter $320
2nd Marine Division $200	U.S. Marines Edition (2005)									4th Marine Division $200
M40 Field Protective Mask $160	U.S. Marines Edition (2005)									Eagle, Globe, and Anchor
Field Radio $140	U.S. Marines Edition (2005)									M1A1 Abrams Battle Tank $350
Marine Corps Community Services $150	U.S. Marines Edition (2005)									Marine Corps birthday Ball Fund (pay $100)
Night Vision Goggles $140	U.S. Marines Edition (2005)									M16-A2 Service Rifle $400
In Jail/Just Visiting	MK 19 Grenade Launcher $120	AT4 $100	Eagle, Globe, and Anchor	Howitzer $100	1st Marine Division $200	Payment On Marine Corps Exchange Account (pay 10% or $200)	MOLLE Pack $60	Iwo Jima	Helmet & Boots $60	Go (collect $200.00 salary as you pass)

Game description: This edition utilizes a military-specific motif. Uncle Pennybags is frequently seen in MARPAT, while the Chance and Community Chest cards use Marine jargon.
Tokens: Pair of boots, helmet, HMMWV, Amphibious Assault Vehicle, AV-8B Harrier, and block letters "USMC".
Other features: The houses are referred to as battalions, and the hotels as regiments. The Community Chest spaces are renamed Iwo Jima (in reference to Raising the Flag on Iwo Jima), while the Chance spaces are renamed Eagle, Globe, and Anchor.

U.S. Navy Edition (2006)

U.S. Space Program Edition (1998)

Copyright date: 1998	Released by: USAopoly, Inc., under license from Hasbro	Issued through: General release

Game description: This edition was released in 1998, to highlight achievements of the U.S. Space Program, including the then-recent Mars Pathfinder mission, and to mark the fortieth anniversary of NASA. The board features photographs related to the U.S. Space Program from 1960 to 1990. Properties include TIROS-1, the X-15, missions from the Mercury, Gemini and Apollo and Shuttle programs. Railroads became the Redstone rocket, the Titan rocket, the Saturn V rocket and the Shuttle. Community Chest and Chance became Earth and Moon, respectively. The tax spaces became Payload Tax (10% or $200) and Docking Tax ($75). The Electric Company and Water Works spaces remained the same.
Tokens: Eight pewter tokens were included: A generic satellite, an Astronaut, a Shuttle (though without a vertical stabilizer), a Lunar Rover, an Apollo Space Capsule, a Lunar lander, the Mars Sojourner rover, and the Hubble Space Telescope.
Other features: The included Mission Manual (at the end of the rules booklet) explains the reasons behind the inclusion of the various Space Program missions on the game board. Currency features the Rich Uncle Pennybags character holding a space helmet and an American flag (rather than his usual tophat and cane). Houses and hotels retained their usual shapes, but became silver hangars and black space centers respectively.

Ultimate Banking Edition

Uncharted Edition

Unicorns vs. Llamas Edition

United States Army Edition (2002)

United States Navy Edition (1998)

UPS First Edition (2005)

UPS Second Edition (2010)

USA Greatest Cities Edition

United Way of Massachusetts Bay Boston Community Limited Edition

== V ==
Van Gogh Official Museum Edition

Venetian, Palazzo Edition (Las Vegas)

Vintage Game Collection Edition

Voice Banking Edition

Volkswagen Classic Collector's Edition

== W ==
W. R. Berkley Corporation 40th Anniversary Edition (2007)

The Walking Dead Edition

The Walking Dead Survival Edition

Warhammer 40,000 Edition

The Wizard of Oz 75th Anniversary Collector's Edition (2013)

The Wizard of Oz Collector's Edition (1998)

Copyright date: 1998	Released by: USAopoly under license from Hasbro, Wizard of Oz film elements licensed from Turner Entertainment Company	Issued through: Originally exclusive to the Warner Brothers Studio Stores, copies also became available through USAopoly's website and other retailers.

Free Parking	Wicked Witch Corner	Good Witch Cards	Haunted Forrest	Monkey Mountain	Courage	Witch's Castle	Guard's Quarters	Water Works	Glenda Gardens	Go To Jail
Poppy Field	The Wizard of Oz Collector's Edition (1998)									Emerald City
Land Of Oz	The Wizard of Oz Collector's Edition (1998)									The Wizard's Hall
Bad Witch Cards	The Wizard of Oz Collector's Edition (1998)									Bad Witch Cards
Apple Orchard	The Wizard of Oz Collector's Edition (1998)									Balloon Central
A Heart	The Wizard of Oz Collector's Edition (1998)									A Way Home
Cowardly Lion's Lair	The Wizard of Oz Collector's Edition (1998)									Good Witch Cards
Tin Man's Wood Hill	The Wizard of Oz Collector's Edition (1998)									Ruby Slippers Way
Electric Company	The Wizard of Oz Collector's Edition (1998)									Luxury Tax
Scarecrow's Cornfield	The Wizard of Oz Collector's Edition (1998)									Home Sweet Home
In Jail/Just Visiting	Glenda's Bubble	Munchkinland	Good Witch Cards	The Rainbow	A Brain	Tornado Insurance	Kansas	Bad Witch Cards	Auntie Em's Farm	Go

Game description: This was one of USAopoly's first boards that mixed a popular film license with their license to produce themed Monopoly boards. For The Wizard of Oz, properties are placed around the board in a sequence roughly paralleling the plot of the movie. Thus the brown spaces feature stills from the sepia-toned sequences of Kansas, the light blue spaces are from Munchkinland, and the green spaces are from the Emerald City. The Utilities remained the same, but the Electric Company is represented by a photo of the jolt that the Wicked Witch of the West received when trying to remove the Ruby Slippers, and the Water Works is represented by a photo of the sequence from the Wicked Witch melting (the space is also subtitled "I'm Melting!!!"). The Community Chest and Chance cards retained those names, but the spaces on the board are represented by the Wicked Witch's hat and Glinda's crown, respectively (and card texts were changed to match the theme). Houses and Hotels were recolored grey and green, and were renamed Farmhouses and Palaces. The dice are described as being ruby red. Currency features photographs of characters from the movie (from Toto on the $1 to Dorothy on the $500). While the dollar sign $ is used, the denominations are said to be in bricks (instead of dollars), issued by the Bank of Emerald City.
Tokens: Eight pewter tokens were included: Heads of Dorothy/Toto, the Scarecrow, the Cowardly Lion, the Tin Man, a Tornado (with a house inside it), the Wicked Witch's hat, Glinda's crown and the pair of ruby slippers.

The Wizard of Oz Collector's Edition (2008)

World Cup France 98 Edition (1998)

Copyright date: 1998

Free Parking	Yugoslavia	Away	France	Sweden	Stade De France	Uruguay	Russia	Soft Drinks Company	Spain	Go To Jail
Hungary	World Cup France 98 Edition (1998)									England
Poland	World Cup France 98 Edition (1998)									Argentina
Home	World Cup France 98 Edition (1998)									Home
Netherlands	World Cup France 98 Edition (1998)									Italy
Stade Du Parc Des Princes	World Cup France 98 Edition (1998)									Stade De Gerland
Czechoslovakia	World Cup France 98 Edition (1998)									Away
Austria	World Cup France 98 Edition (1998)									Germany
Lighting Company	World Cup France 98 Edition (1998)									Sign On Fee
Belgium	World Cup France 98 Edition (1998)									Brazil
Jail	Mexico	Chile	Away	Romania	Stade Vélodrome	Transfer Fee	Switzerland	Home	Scotland	Go

World Edition

World of Warcraft Collector's Edition

Wrestlemania Edition

WWE Edition

== X ==
X-Men Collector's Edition

X-Men '97 Edition

== Y ==
Yu-Gi-Oh! Edition

== Z ==
Zappos.com Collector's Edition

== USA (Spanish language) ==
U.S. Standard Edition en Español

Copyright date: 1985	Released by: Parker Brothers/Kenner Parker Toys	Issued through: General release

Game description: This is a Spanish translation of a U.S. Standard Edition Monopoly set. All placenames are literal translation of the original Atlantic City, New Jersey locations. Even the infamous misspelling of Marven Gardens is carried over, as Jardines Marvin on this board. All four railroads have the same names, the Electric Company and Water Works are also both kept. Under the space for Go, the Spanish word ¡Adelante! is written. The currency has the same colors and design as a standard U.S. set, with the legend "Copyright 1935 by Parker Brothers Inc." Similarly, the Community Chest (Arca Communal) and Chance (Casualidad) cards feature the Uncle Pennybags/Mr. Monopoly character that was introduced in 1936. Houses are the standard green plastic, and hotels are the standard red plastic.
Tokens: These are also based on the standard U.S. Edition game set, as of 1985 they were: a cannon, a battleship, a dog, a horse and rider, a shoe, a tophat, a wheelbarrow, a thimble, an iron and a car.
Other features: This 1985 edition was released by Parker Brothers as a division of the then Kenner Parker Toys, which was later bought out by Hasbro.

== USA (French translation) ==
French Canadian edition

Released by: Hasbro

Game description: The standard French-Canadian version consists of French translations of the original US version, with few changes related for instance to the name of the railway stations.

== Cities ==
Antigo, Wisconsin, issued in 2020

Atlanta Edition (1994, 1995)

Atlantic City (standard edition). First issued by Parker Brothers in 1935. Mega Edition featuring more Atlantic City streets released in 2006.

Baltimore Edition (1997)

Bar Harbor, Maine, issued unknown

Boston

Free Parking	Bloomingdale's	Chance	Prudential Center	Filene's	The Boston Common Parking Garage	The Lenox Hotel	The Bostonian Hotel	Bostongas	The Colonnade	Go To Jail
Ye Olde Union Oyster House	Boston									Deloitte & Touche LLP
The Capital Grille	Boston									Smith Barney
Community Chest	Boston									Community Chest
Legal Sea Foods	Boston									Federated Services Company
North Station	Boston									South Station
The New Museum	Boston									Chance
Isabella Stewart Gardner Museum	Boston									BankBoston
Boston Edison	Boston									Luxury Tax
The Children's Museum	Boston									Shreve, Crump & Low
Jail	The Sports Museum of New England	Boston Celtics	Chance	Boston Red Sox	Massport	Income Tax	USS Constitution Museum	Community Chest	The Boston Public Library	Go

Bellevue, Washington, issued 2025

Boston – two editions: Boston, issued in 1994, 1995, 1996 and Boston (Historic) issued in 1998.

Cambridge Edition (2020; produced by Top Trumps USA; not to be confused with the Cambridge Edition in England)

Cedar Rapids, Iowa, issued unknown

Charlotte issued in 1997.

Chicago Edition

Copyright date: 2000	Released by: USAopoly under license from Hasbro	Issued through: General release (issued in 1995, 1996 and 2000)

Free Parking	Kentucky Avenue $220	Chance	Indiana Avenue $220	Illinois Avenue $240	B&O Railroad $200	Atlantic Avenue $260	Ventnor Avenue $260	Water Works $150	Marvin Gardens $280	Go To Jail
New York Avenue $200	Chicago Edition									Pacific Avenue $300
Tennessee Avenue $180	Chicago Edition									North Carolina Avenue $300
Community Chest	Chicago Edition									Community Chest
St. James Place $180	Chicago Edition									Pennsylvania Avenue $320
Pennsylvania Railroad $200	Chicago Edition									Short Line $200
Virginia Avenue $160	Chicago Edition									Chance
States Avenue $140	Chicago Edition									Park Place $350
Electric Company $150	Chicago Edition									Luxury Tax (pay $100)
St. Charles Place $140	Chicago Edition									Boardwalk $400
In Jail/Just Visiting	Connecticut Avenue $120	Vermont Avenue $100	Chance	Oriental Avenue $100	Reading Railroad $200	Income Tax (pay $200)	Baltic Avenue $60	Community Chest	Mediter-ranean Avenue $60	Go

Game description: This was one in a series of officially licensed city edition Monopoly game boards for various U.S. cities. The Chicago edition board features photographs of 21 existing Chicago landmarks, and one historical landmark: Fort Dearborn. The main background of the board is a photograph overlooking the Chicago River. The four railroad spaces were replaced with four well-known companies headquartered in Chicago: Bank One (which was absorbed by Chase in 2005, but whose logo also appeared on this edition's currency), Yellow Cab, Chicago Tribune and Eli's Cheesecake. Houses and hotels are the standard green and red plastic. The utility spaces are ComEd and the Chicago Water Works.
Tokens: Six pewter tokens were included: A rolled up Chicago Tribune, the Chicago Water Tower, Sears Tower, a Wolley Cab car, the Navy Pier Ferris wheel and a slice of Eli's Cheesecake.

Cincinnati, issued in 1998.

Cleveland (1996)

Free Parking	Pierre's	Chance	Kaufmann's	Cleveland Museum of Art Store	Green Line	Marymount	Fairview Health System	City Of Cleveland Water	The Cleveland Clinic Center	Go To Jail
Cleveland Indians	Cleveland (1996)									Sherwin-Williams
Cleveland Browns	Cleveland (1996)									National City
Community Chest	Cleveland (1996)									Community Chest
Cleveland Cavaliers	Cleveland (1996)									Ameritech
Blue Line	Cleveland (1996)									Continental Airlines
Severance Hall	Cleveland (1996)									Chance
Karamu House Inc	Cleveland (1996)									The Avenue Tower City Centre
Cleveland Public Power	Cleveland (1996)									Luxury Tax
Playhouse Square Center	Cleveland (1996)									Rock and Roll Hall of Fame Museum
Jail	Cleveland Magazine	WMJI Magic 105.7	Chance	Sun Newspapers	Red Line	City Tax	Seaworld	Community Chest	Cleveland Metroparks Zoo	Go

Dallas (1996)

Free Parking	FAO Schwarz Fifth Avenue	Chance	Foley's	Macy's	Dart Rail Light Rail Transit	Quadrangle	Highland Park Village	Lone Star Gas	North Park Center	Go To Jail
The Staubach Company	Dallas (1996)									The Stoneleigh Hotel
Ebby Holiday Realtors	Dallas (1996)									The Fairmont
Community Chest	Dallas (1996)									Community Chest
EDS	Dallas (1996)									The Mansion Of Dallas-Fort Worth
Dallas Love Field	Dallas (1996)									Southwest Airlines
Simon David and Tom Thumb	Dallas (1996)									Chance
Weir's Furniture Village	Dallas (1996)									Texas Stadium
Tuelectric	Dallas (1996)									Luxury Tax
Zen Floral Design Studio	Dallas (1996)									Cowboys
Jail	Star Canyon New Texas Cuisine	Cafe Pacific	Chance	Patrizio	Commuter Rail Dart	City Tax	African American Museum	Community Chest	Dallas Zoo	Go

Dana Point, issued in 1996.

Denver, issued in 1996

Detroit, issued in 1997.

East Longmeadow, Massachusetts Edition, issued in 2009.

Fond du Lac, Wisconsin, issued in 2007.

Fox Cities, Wisconsin, issued in 2003.

Frankfort, Kentucky Year Unknown. Frankfort-Opoly (Kentucky Distilled Frankfort-Opoly). A game featuring Frankfort & Franklin County, Kentucky.

Gillette, Wyoming (2019)

Released by: Late for the Sky Productions	Issued through: Walmart

I ❤ Gillette!	Campbell County High School	Contingency	Thunder Basin High School	Campbell County Fair	Kendrick Avenue	Rockpile Museum	Powder River Playhouse	Fire Department	Donkey Creek Festival	Exit To Traffic Jam
Foothills Theatre	Gillette, Wyoming (2019)									Frontier Auto Museum
CCSD Planetarium	Gillette, Wyoming (2019)									Campbell County Recreation Center
Big Fun	Gillette, Wyoming (2019)									Big Fun
Avenues of Art	Gillette, Wyoming (2019)									CAM-PLEX
Gillette Avenue	Gillette, Wyoming (2019)									Emerson Avenue
Pokey's BBQ	Gillette, Wyoming (2019)									City Hall
Pizza Carrello	Gillette, Wyoming (2019)									Contingency
Police Station	Gillette, Wyoming (2019)									Car Fine
The Coop	Gillette, Wyoming (2019)									Downtown Gillette
Traffic Jam/Detour	Lasting Legacy Park	Ice Cream Cafe	Contingency	Dalbey Memorial Park	Highway 59	Property Tax	Coal	Big Fun	Pronghorn	Go (collect $200)

Tokens: high-five, big smile, heart, dog, pretzel, gym shoe

Grand Rapids, issued in 2004.

Green Bay, issued in 2000.

Greenfield, Massachusetts, issued in 2005

Greenwich Edition (2020; produced by Top Trumps USA)

Hollywood (1997)

Free Parking	California Film Commission	Chance	United Talent Agency	International Creative Management	Network NBC	Miramax Films	Dimension Films	Water Works	Polygram Films	Go To Jail
The Hollywood Reporter	Hollywood (1997)									Tristar
Premiere Movie Magazine	Hollywood (1997)									Columbia
Community Chest	Hollywood (1997)									Community Chest
Billboard Live	Hollywood (1997)									Sony Pictures
Network ABC	Hollywood (1997)									Network E!
Capitol Records	Hollywood (1997)									Chance
Palace	Hollywood (1997)									Twentieth Century Fox
Electric Company	Hollywood (1997)									Luxury Tax
Hollywood Bowl	Hollywood (1997)									Paramount
Jail	Dolby Digital	Panavision Woodland Hills	Chance	Color By DeLuxe	Network CBS	City Tax	Hollywood Boulevard	Community Chest	Hollywood & Vine	Go

Houma, Louisiana, issued in 2006

Houston (1996)

Free Parking	Oshman's Supersports Vsa	Chance	Macy's	Foley's	BMW	Hermann	Tirr Systems	Southwestern Bell	Texas Children's Hospital	Go To Jail
Houston Astros	Houston (1996)									George R. Brown Convention Center
TPC The Woodlands	Houston (1996)									The Houstonian Hotel Club and Bar
Community Chest	Houston (1996)									Community Chest
Houston Livestock Show and Rodeo	Houston (1996)									The Wyndham Warwick Hotel
Port Of Houston Authority	Houston (1996)									Southwest Airlines
The Children's Museum of Houston	Houston (1996)									Chance
FAO Schwarz	Houston (1996)									Space Center Houston
HL&P	Houston (1996)									Luxury Tax
The Houston Zoo	Houston (1996)									Astrodome
Jail	Landry's Seafood House	Willie G's Oyster Bar	Chance	Joe's Crab Shack	Metro	City Tax	The Cynthia Woods Mitchell Pavilion	Community Chest	Theater District	Go

Indianapolis (1996)

Free Parking	St. Vincent Hospitals	Chance	Dow Brands	Eli Lilly and Company	Indiana Railroad	Indianapolis Business Journal	The Saturday Evening Post	Ameritech	The Star Indianapolis	Go To Jail
St. Elmo Steakhouse	Indianapolis (1996)									Talk To Tucker's Realtors
Rathskeller Restaurant	Indianapolis (1996)									Bank One
Community Chest	Indianapolis (1996)									Community Chest
Indiana Roof Ballroom	Indianapolis (1996)									Anthem
Union Station	Indianapolis (1996)									Indygo
Indianapolis Pacers	Indianapolis (1996)									Chance
Indianapolis Indians	Indianapolis (1996)									American United Life Insurance Co.
Ipalco Enterprises	Indianapolis (1996)									Luxury Tax
Indianapolis Colts	Indianapolis (1996)									Indianapolis Speedway
Jail	Parisian	L-S Ayres	Chance	Circle Centre	American Trans Air	City Tax	Eiteljorg Museum	Community Chest	Children's Museum	Go

Jacksonville Edition (2002)

Kansas City Edition (1997)

La Jolla Edition (1994)

Las Vegas Edition (1997, 2000)

Las Vegas Fabulous Edition

Los Angeles Edition (1996)

New York City (1994, 1995, 1996, 1998, 2001, 2011)

Copyright date: 1994, 1995, 1996, 1998, 2001, and 2011	Released by: USAopoly

Free Parking	Macy's	Chance	FAO Schwarz	Bloomingdale's	John F Kennedy International Airport	Les Celebrites	The Rainbow Room	Con Edison Gas	The Four Seasons	Go To Jail
Lincoln Center	New York City (1994, 1995, 1996, 1998, 2001, 2011)									The Regency Hotel
American Museum of Natural History	New York City (1994, 1995, 1996, 1998, 2001, 2011)									Essex House
Community Chest	New York City (1994, 1995, 1996, 1998, 2001, 2011)									Community Chest
New York Yankees	New York City (1994, 1995, 1996, 1998, 2001, 2011)									The Plaza
Penn Station	New York City (1994, 1995, 1996, 1998, 2001, 2011)									Grand Central Station
Empire State Building	New York City (1994, 1995, 1996, 1998, 2001, 2011)									Chance
Statue of Liberty	New York City (1994, 1995, 1996, 1998, 2001, 2011)									Tiffany & Co.
Con Edison Electric	New York City (1994, 1995, 1996, 1998, 2001, 2011)									Luxury Tax
Central Park	New York City (1994, 1995, 1996, 1998, 2001, 2011)									Trump Tower
Jail	George Washington Bridge	Brooklyn Bridge	Chance	Holland Tunnel	La Guardia Airport	City Tax	World Trade Center	Community Chest	South Street Seaport	Go

Game description: Board layout above is for a circa 1994 board. Later printings had many changes including:
- "Boardwalk": The Plaza (1996), Fifth Avenue (1998), Statue of Liberty (2001), Ellis Island (2011)

Louisville, Kentucky Year Unknown. Louisville-Opoly. A game celebrating Derby City.

Manitowoc Edition (2000)

Menomonie, Wisconsin, issued in 2004 (Menomonopoly).

Minneapolis, Saint Paul (Twin Cities Edition), issued 1997.

Moberly, Missouri Unknown issue date.

Orlando, issued in 1997.

Omaha, Nebraska, issued in October 2024.

Philadelphia (1996)

Free Parking	Temple Owls	Chance	Academy of Music	Avenue of the Arts	Suburban	Philadelphia Eagles	CoreStates Complex	Gas Company	Philadelphia Phillies	Go To Jail
The Old Original Bookbinder's	Philadelphia (1996)									City Hall
Katmandu	Philadelphia (1996)									Boathouse Row
Community Chest	Philadelphia (1996)									Community Chest
Di Lullo	Philadelphia (1996)									The Free Library of Philadelphia
University City	Philadelphia (1996)									Frankford
Philadelphia Museum of Art	Philadelphia (1996)									Chance
The Franklin Institute Science Museum	Philadelphia (1996)									Independence Hall
Electric Company	Philadelphia (1996)									Luxury Tax
The Philadelphia Zoo	Philadelphia (1996)									CoreStates
Jail	The Shops at Liberty Place	Strawbridge's	Chance	Franklin Mills	Market East	City Tax	Italian Market	Community Chest	Mummers Museum	Go

Pittsburgh, issued in 1996.

Portland, Oregon (issue date unknown)

Port Arthur, Texas (2013)

Rochester (issue date unknown)

Riverside, California (issued on October 10, 2024)

Riverside, California (2024)

Free Parking	Power of 2 Reality	Chance	Clark's Nutrition & Natural Foods Market	Mark from Riverside	Magnolia Avenue	Prohibition Whiskey Lounge & Kitchen	Riverside Airport Cafe	Riverside Municipal Water District	March Field Air Museum	Go To Jail
Fairmount Park	Riverside, California (2024)									Mission Inn Run
Farm House Collective	Riverside, California (2024)									Downtown Riverside
Community Chest	Riverside, California (2024)									Community Chest
The Riverside Magazine	Riverside, California (2024)									Riverside Convention Center
Arlington Avenue	Riverside, California (2024)									Victoria Avenue
California Citrus State Historic Park	Riverside, California (2024)									Chance
Riverside Community College (RCC)	Riverside, California (2024)									Mission Inn Foundation
Altura Credit Union	Riverside, California (2024)									Altura Credit Union
California School For The Deaf Riverside	Riverside, California (2024)									Mt. Rubidoux
Jail	Riverside Art Museum	The Cheech Marin Center of Chicano Art & Culture	Chance	The Chinese Pavilion	Van Buren Avenue	Altura Credit Union	91 East	Community Chest	91 Wesr	Go

San Diego (1994, 1995, 1996, 2002)

Free Parking	Macy's	Chance	FAO Schwarz	Horton Plaza	San Diego Trolley	Aviara Golf Club	San Diego Chargers	Water Works	San Diego Padres	Go To Jail
Z Gallerie	San Diego (1994, 1995, 1996, 2002)									Old Town Mexican Cafe
Brady's	San Diego (1994, 1995, 1996, 2002)									Bully's East
Community Chest	San Diego (1994, 1995, 1996, 2002)									Community Chest
Robinsons May	San Diego (1994, 1995, 1996, 2002)									Corvette Diner
Old Town Trolley Tours	San Diego (1994, 1995, 1996, 2002)									Southwest Airlines
San Diego Wild Animal Park	San Diego (1994, 1995, 1996, 2002)									Chance
Reuben H. Fleet Space Theater and Science Park	San Diego (1994, 1995, 1996, 2002)									Panda's
Electric Company	San Diego (1994, 1995, 1996, 2002)									Luxury Tax
US Olympic Training Center, San Diego	San Diego (1994, 1995, 1996, 2002)									SeaWorld
Jail	Shelter Island	Mission Bay Park	Chance	Balboa Park	Giant Dipper, Belmont Park	City Tax	San Diego Hall of Champions Sports Museum	Community Chest	Seau's The Restaurant	Go

San Francisco (1995)

Free Parking	FAO Schwarz	Chance	Z Gallerie	Macy's	Caltrain	Smith Barney	Deloitte & Touche	Water Works	Citibank	Go To Jail
Masa's	San Francisco (1995)									The Westin St. Francis
Fog City Diner	San Francisco (1995)									Mark Hopkins Inter-Continental
Community Chest	San Francisco (1995)									Community Chest
Vertigo	San Francisco (1995)									The Fairmont
Southwest Airlines	San Francisco (1995)									Hornblower Dining Yachts
Big 98.1	San Francisco (1995)									Chance
San Francisco Ficus	San Francisco (1995)									Wilkes Bashford
Electric Company	San Francisco (1995)									Luxury Tax
San Francisco Chronicle	San Francisco (1995)									Gump's
Jail	Pier 39	San Francisco Zoo	Chance	San Francisco Museum of Modern Art	Samtrans	City Tax	Golden Gate Bridge	Community Chest	Coit Tower	Go

San Francisco Historic Edition (1998)

Seattle Edition (1997)

Sheboygan Edition (2001)

Shelbyville, Kentucky Shelbyville-Opoly (2021). A fun game celebrating Shelbyville, Kentucky (in Shelby County, Kentucky).

St. Louis Edition (1997)

Twin Cities Edition (1997)

Teaneck, New Jersey, 10th ed. issued in 2012.

Tullahoma, Tennessee Edition (unknown, 2019)

Utica, New York, issued 2018.

Washington, D.C. (1997)

Free Parking	Fahrney's Pens Inc.	Chance	FAO Schwarz	Hecht's	Anacostia	1789 Restaurant	Clyde's	Washington Gas	Old Ebbitt Grill	Go To Jail
Georgetown Park	Washington, D.C. (1997)									Renaissance Mayflower Hotel
Union Station	Washington, D.C. (1997)									Loews l'Enfant Plaza Hotel
Community Chest	Washington, D.C. (1997)									Community Chest
Mazza Gallerie	Washington, D.C. (1997)									Hotel Washington
Archives & Navy Memorial	Washington, D.C. (1997)									Metro Center
The Kennedy Center	Washington, D.C. (1997)									Chance
The Pentagon	Washington, D.C. (1997)									Capitol
Pepco	Washington, D.C. (1997)									Luxury Tax
Smithsonian Institution	Washington, D.C. (1997)									White House
Jail	Washington Monument	Jefferson Memorial	Chance	Lincoln Memorial	Woodley Park Zoo	City Tax	Bullets	Community Chest	US Air Arena	Go

Wilkes-Barre, issued 2012.

Worcester Edition (2021; produced by Top Trumps USA)

== States ==
Alaska (1997, 2003)

Free Parking	Ketchikan	Chance	Juneau	Anchorage	Float Plane	Black Bear	Grizzly Bear	Portage Glacier	Polar Bear	Go To Jail
Wolf	Alaska (1997, 2003)									Kenai Fjords
Caribou	Alaska (1997, 2003)									Glacier Bay
Community Chest	Alaska (1997, 2003)									Community Chest
Moose	Alaska (1997, 2003)									Denali National Park
Dog Sled	Alaska (1997, 2003)									Cruise Ship
Whale	Alaska (1997, 2003)									Chance
Walrus	Alaska (1997, 2003)									Bald Eagle
Pipeline	Alaska (1997, 2003)									Luxury Tax
Otter	Alaska (1997, 2003)									Mount McKinley
Jail	Seward Harbor	King Salmon	Chance	Silver Salmon	White Pass Railroad	Income Tax	Arctic Sunset	Community Chest	Northern Lights	Go

Arizona, issued in 1998.

Florida, issued in 1998.

Hawaii, issued in 1996.

Maine, issued in 1999.

Oregon, issued in 1998.

Rhode Island, issued in 1998.

Texas, issued in 1999, also available in a container in the shape of the state.

Utah, issued in 1998.

== Territories ==
Puerto Rico, issued in 2005.

== Regions ==
Napa Valley, California, issued in 1997.

New England, issued in 2001.

Palos Verdes, issued in 2007. Palos Verdes Peninsula Chamber of Commerce |

== Professional sports teams ==
Boston Bruins Stanley Cup Champions (2011)

Boston Celtics Collector's Edition (2006)

Boston Red Sox Collector's Edition (2000, 2006, 2008)

Boston Red Sox World Series Champions Collector's Edition (2004, 2007)

Chicago Bears Collector's Edition (2005, 2008)

Chicago Blackhawks Collector's Edition (2010)

Chicago Cubs Collector's Edition (2002)

Chicago White Sox World Series Collector's Edition (2005)

Cleveland Browns Edition (1999)

Dallas Cowboys Collector's Edition (2003, 2008)

Denver Broncos Commemorative Super Bowl Edition (XXXII)

Detroit Pistons 50 Seasons Collector's Edition

Detroit Red Wings Collector's Edition

Detroit Tigers Collector's Edition (2006)

Green Bay Packers Collector's Edition (2000, 2003)

Houston Astros Edition (2005)

Indianapolis Colts Super Bowl Champions Collector's Edition (XLI)

Los Angeles Lakers Collector's Edition

Los Angeles Lakers Legends Edition

Los Angeles Dodgers Collector's Edition (2000, 2018)

Miami Dolphins Collector's Edition (2004)

Minnesota Vikings Collector's Edition (2005)

Minnesota Wild Collector's Edition (2006)

New England Patriots Collector's Edition (2003, 2004, 2008)

New Orleans Saints Super Bowl Collector's Edition (XLIV)

New York Giants Collector's Edition (2003, 2006)

New York Giants Super Bowl Champions Edition (XLII)

New York Jets Collector's Edition (2004)

New York Mets Collector's Edition (2001, 2005, 2006 Blue or Orange)

New York Yankees Collector's Edition (2000, 2001, 2006 Light or Dark Blue)

New York Yankees The Century's Team Edition

Oakland Raiders Collector's Edition (2004, 2008)

Philadelphia Eagles Collector's Edition (2003)

Philadelphia Phillies World Series Champions Collector's Edition (2008)

Pittsburgh Penguins Collector's Edition (2010)

Pittsburgh Steelers Collector's Edition (2004)

Pittsburgh Steelers Super Bowl XL Champions Edition (2006)

Pittsburgh Steelers Super Bowl XLIII Champions Collector's Edition (2009)

San Antonio Spurs Collector's Edition (2007)

San Francisco Giants Collector's Edition (2003)

Seattle Mariners Collector's Edition (2001)

Seattle Mariners 25th Anniversary Collector's Edition (2002)

St. Louis Cardinals Collector's Edition (2001)

St. Louis Cardinals World Series Champions Collector's Edition (2006)

St. Louis Rams Super Bowl Champions Edition (XXXIV)

Washington Redskins Collector's Edition ()

== Universities ==
Florida State University Edition (1998)

Ohio State University Edition (1997)

University of Kansas Edition (1998)

University of Tennessee Edition (1998)

University of Washington Edition (1998)

== See also ==
- Late for the Sky Production Company - produces, manufactures, and distributes Monopoly-inspired games in the U.S.
