= Fortnite Monopoly =

2018 board game

Monopoly: Fortnite Edition, commonly called Fortnite Monopoly, is a licensed edition of the board game Monopoly, themed on Fortnite Battle Royale, a battle royale video game. It was released on October 1, 2018, by Hasbro, following Fortnite's highly successful release the previous year. A "Collector's Edition" was released in 2021. There is also a "Flip Edition".

The gameplay incorporates aspects from Fortnite, with properties named after the battle royale's Chapter 1 locations, such as the Tilted Towers. Other thematic adjustments include the use of health points in lieu of money, which players gradually lose when stepping on spaces affected by the "Storm". The number of such spaces increases during a game, analogous to how the playable area gradually shrinks in a video game's match. Further, players are allowed to immediately claim an initially visited, unclaimed property without buying or auctioning it off, which represents how the video game's players begin by landing at a chosen area and then loot it for materials and weapons. A special "action" die is used, allowing players to build defensive walls, attack opponents or heal.

The NPD Group declared that Monopoly Fortnite was the top selling new games super-category item in the United States for the week ending October 6, 2018. GamesRadar+ described it as "one of the more inventive remakes [of Monopoly]; it cleverly translates the battle royale's mechanics for a tabletop audience". According to a Dicebreaker review, the game "takes big swings, changes up Monopoly’s core rules and, remarkably, feels like an entirely new game", but remains strategically shallow and predominantly a game of chance rather than skill, as it mostly lacks meaningful player choices (while players can, e.g., attack other players, whether they will attack or perform some other action depends on the action dice throw)—keeping in the spirit of the base version. An Inverse reviewer noted that the deadly Storm allows for quick games, with losses not causing much frustration but winning not feeling especially rewarding either—reflecting the experience of playing Fortnite—and that: "Unlike classic Monopoly, players may actually want to continue playing after finishing a game".

== See also ==
- List of licensed and localized editions of Monopoly: USA
