= Eli's Cheesecake =

American cheesecake company

- Eli's Cheesecake Logo
- Type: Private
- Industry: Food production
- Founded: 1980
- Founder: Eli Schulman
- Headquarters: Chicago, Illinois, USA
- Products: Cheesecake
- Owner: Marc Schulman, President
- Number of employees: 51-200
- Website: www.elischeesecake.com

Eli's Cheesecake is a cheesecake company based in Chicago. Eli's Original Plain Cheesecake, which has been called "Chicago's most famous dessert", is made of cream cheese, sour cream, eggs, sugar, and vanilla in a butter shortbread cookie crust. Since the introduction of Eli's Original Plain Cheesecake, the company now offers cheesecakes with various ingredients such as chocolate, fruit, or caramel, as well as other desserts like tarts, cakes, and tiramisu.

== History ==
Eli Schulman was born in 1910 on the West Side of Chicago. In 1940, he started his first venture in the restaurant business with a popular coffee shop called Eli's Ogden Huddle. He followed Eli's Odgen Huddle with Eli's Stage Delicatessen, where several notable performers dined.

=== Eli's The Place For Steak ===
In 1966, Eli's The Place for Steak was opened and the celebrities followed. Celebrities such as Frank Sinatra, Sammy Davis Jr., Gale Sayers, and Henny Youngman all spent time dining at Eli's The Place for Steak. During the late 1970s, Eli Schulman developed the original plain cheesecake as the signature dessert for Eli's The Place for Steak. The cheesecake represented the restaurant at the first Taste of Chicago in 1980, and it eventually became the festival's most popular dessert, with about 2 million slices sold as of 2005. After being open for 39 years, Eli's The Place for Steak closed in 2005.

Company president, Marc Schulman

=== Eli's Cheesecake Company ===
Eli's Cheesecake Company became its own company soon after the first Taste of Chicago in 1980 with a small North Side plant. In 1996, Eli's Cheesecake Company moved to its current location in Chicago's Dunning neighborhood. The new location, called Eli's Cheesecake World, includes a 62,000-square-foot (5,800 m^{2}) state-of-the-art antique bakery, bakery cafe, and corporate offices. Eli's Cheesecake products get shipped to customers all over the U.S. and to stores internationally. Eli's is also available via a cooperation with Lou Malnati's through Lou Malnati's Tastes of Chicago, which provides Chicago-style cuisine nationally.

Eli Schulman's son, Marc Schulman, became president of Eli's Cheesecake in 1984 and has been running the company since his father's death on May 8, 1988. Later in 1988, a playground across from the street from Eli's the Place for Steak was dedicated in Eli's memory and named the "Eli M. Schulman Playground".

In November 2015, The Eli's Cheesecake Company launched their first cookbook, The Eli's Cheesecake Cookbook: Remarkable Recipes from a Chicago Legend. The cookbook pays homage to founder Eli M. Schulman and includes 40 different recipes, including Eli's Cheesecake's classic cheesecakes such as Original Plain, Chocolate Chip, and Banana Chocolate, plus recipes from Eli's famous Chicago steakhouse, like Shrimp deJonghe. Aside from the recipes, the cookbook gives anecdotes from president Marc Schulman, wife Maureen Schulman, and a commentary from Chicago radio personality, Rick Kogan. A second edition of the Eli's Cheesecake Cookbook was published in 2021 with additional recipes and stories, including international family recipes submitted by Eli's employees.

== Accomplishments ==
Eli's has made cheesecakes for four American presidential inaugurations. In both 1993 and 1997, it made 2,000 pound cheesecakes for Bill Clinton's inauguration ceremonies. In January 2009, Eli's produced a 500-pound cheesecake for Barack Obama's inaugural ball, and in January 2013, the company made a 500-pound cheesecake for Obama's Inaugural Staff Ball.

Desperate Housewives' Jamie Denton and the Band From TV celebrate Eli's 30th birthday at the Taste of Chicago.

Eli's Cheesecake made a 2,000-pound cheesecake to commemorate the Burnham Plan Centennial on June 27, 2009, as well as the twenty-ninth anniversary of the Taste of Chicago and Eli's Cheesecake. Eli's has also made cheesecakes over the years for events such as Hillary Clinton's 50th birthday, Disney World's 25th birthday, Abraham Lincoln's Birthday Bicentennial Banquet (which President Barack Obama attended), Chicago's 150th birthday and Illinois' Governor Pat Quinn's inauguration in 2011. In 2015, Eli's made a cake for the James Beard Awards Welcome Reception in Chicago. Eli's Cheesecake continues to be favorite at the Taste of Chicago.

Eli's has also been featured on some popular television shows, such as The Tonight Show with Jay Leno and The Oprah Winfrey Show. In May 2012, Eli's Cheesecake was featured on ABC World News with Diane Sawyer in a special called "Made in America".

Eli's broke ground on a 42,000 sq. ft. bakery expansion in July 2022.
