= Betty Boop's Bizzy Bee =

1932 film

- Directed by: Dave Fleischer
- Produced by: Max Fleischer
- Starring: Little Ann Little
- Animation by: Animated by: Seymour Kneitel and Bernard Wolf
- Color process: Black-and-white; Color (1972 redrawn color edition)
- Production company: Fleischer Studios
- Distributed by: Paramount Pictures
- Release date: August 19, 1932
- Running time: 7 minutes
- Country: United States
- Language: English

Betty Boop's Bizzy Bee is a 1932 Fleischer Studios animated short film starring Betty Boop and featuring Bimbo and Koko the Clown.

== Plot ==
Betty Boop is the owner and operator of the Bizzy Bee, a popular lunch wagon in the city. Even though wheat cakes are the only food item on the menu, the place is always packed, thanks to Betty Boop's cute face. Bimbo saw her and gave her a rose, when Betty Boop give a heart. Bimbo chase it with a net, and it land on the inside. Koko the Clown asks for a hot soup, unfortunately, it was cold, like freezing cold with ice skating on top. Betty Boop grab a fire to heat it up. A running gag centers around a hippopotamus vainly requesting that someone "please pass the sugar"; in the end, he's covered with sugar.

A Hippo Man came in and shove a guy out. He asked Betty Boop for wheat cakes and then briefly notices a little creature sleeping who pull a curtain in his cages for privacy. Hippo Man ask "More!", Betty Boop begin serving wheat cakes which is spreading not only in the lunch wagon, but also the city. The Moon gulps some of the wheat cakes. Unfortunately, while eating, Hippo Man yell in pain because a short look is showing that wheat cakes are wrestling, indicating he has eaten too much and is getting stomached. He tries to get rid of the extra weight, but it moves into different areas. Then a guy shouted "Ow! Ow!" before twirling into pretzel in pain before jumping out. A bear guy also had a stomachache before jumping out the window with Koko having the same reaction. More men jump out of the window in pain, running in circle while shouting "Ow! Ow!" because they have eaten too much wheat cakes. Even a grill and lunch wagon are having stomached and holding their belly as if they have eaten too much wheat cakes. To add insult to injury, a Moon moans in pain, so the stars have to put him in a stretcher. As a result, a Star put a lantern to substitute the Moon, ending the cartoon.
