= Betty Boop's Crazy Inventions =

1933 American animated short film

- Directed by: Dave Fleischer
- Produced by: Max Fleischer
- Starring: Mae Questel (Betty Boop); Billy Murray (Bimbo)
- Music by: Samuel Lerner; Sammy Timberg
- Animation by: Ugo D'Orsi; Willard Bowsky; Bernard Wolf
- Color process: Black-and-white
- Production company: Fleischer Studios
- Distributed by: Paramount Publix Corporation
- Release date: January 27, 1933
- Running time: 7 minutes
- Country: United States
- Language: English

Betty Boop's Crazy Inventions is a 1933 Fleischer Studios animated short film, featuring Betty Boop.

This cartoon was first theatrically released with the Mae West film She Done Him Wrong.

== Plot ==
At the inventor's show, Betty, Bimbo, and Koko the Clown demonstrate a variety of gadgets, including:

- The spot remover — a large steam-powered device that removes the spot by cutting a hole in the fabric.
- The cigarette snuffer — a mechanical foot sniffs out the cigarette, then a mechanical hand sweeps it up.
- The soup silencer — parts from a music box are installed on a spoon to convert the slurps to music.
- The sweet corn regulator — a typewriter is adapted to position the corn for easy eating.
- The voice recorder
- The self-threading sewing machine — a mechanical hand and eyeball thread the needle.

When the automated sewing machine gets out of control and proceeds to sew various things together, Bimbo and Betty escape via an umbrella that turns into a helicopter.

== In other media ==
- A short clip from this cartoon can be seen in the opening credits of the Futurama episode "A Fishful of Dollars".
