= Betty Boop's May Party =

1933 film

- Directed by: Dave Fleischer
- Produced by: Max Fleischer
- Starring: Little Ann Little
- Music by: Duke Ellington ("It Don't Mean a Thing If It Ain't Got That Swing")
- Animation by: David Tendlar; William Henning
- Color process: Black-and-white
- Production company: Fleischer Studios
- Distributed by: Paramount Pictures
- Release date: May 12, 1933
- Running time: 7 minutes
- Country: United States
- Language: English

Betty Boop's May Party is a 1933 Fleischer Studios animated short film starring Betty Boop, and featuring Koko the Clown and Bimbo.

== Plot ==
An elephant punctures a rubber tree, whose spraying sap turns the whole town rubbery. Betty and the gang use their newfound limberness to dance and sing.

In the film, Betty sings "Here We Are", written by Harry Warren and Gus Kahn.
