= The Old Man of the Mountain (film) =

1933 film by Dave Fleischer

- Directed by: Dave Fleischer
- Produced by: Max Fleischer
- Starring: Cab Calloway; Bonnie Poe (all uncredited)
- Music by: Cab Calloway and his Orchestra
- Animation by: Bernard Wolf; Thomas Johnson
- Color process: Black and white Color (1972 redrawn color edition)
- Production company: Fleischer Studios
- Distributed by: Paramount Pictures
- Release date: August 4, 1933
- Running time: 6:57; 5:45 (1972 redrawn color edition with titles, live-action footage and credits cut)
- Country: United States
- Language: English

The Old Man of the Mountain is a 1933 American pre-Code live-action/animated short in the Betty Boop series, produced by Fleischer Studios. Featuring music by Cab Calloway and his Orchestra (as with Minnie the Moocher), the short was originally released to theaters on August 4, 1933, by Paramount Pictures. Calloway voices all of the characters in the cartoon save for Betty herself (voiced by Bonnie Poe, her singing voice provided by Mae Questel). Calloway and his orchestra also perform all of the music in the cartoon, including two songs Calloway co-wrote.

== Plot ==
The short begins with a live-action introduction of Calloway and his orchestra, who perform a short chorus of "Minnie the Moocher" (written by Cab Calloway, Clarence Gaskill and Irving Mills) before performing a vamp of the title song, "The Old Man of the Mountain" (Billy Hill [aka George Brown] and Victor Young).

As the cartoon proper begins, a lion on roller skates (made of rabbits) rushes from his guard post atop a mountain, racing into a nearby village shouting "Look out! The Old Man of the Mountain!" The lion's warning sparks a mass exodus of the other animals who pack up their things and start to flee as the lion continues to warn "Look out! The Old Man of the Mountain!"

In time, Betty Boop emerges from a guest house in order to find out what is going on. She confronts a passing owl, who in song describes the Old Man of the Mountain, a predatory hermit who threatens the livelihood of the villagers, particularly the women. Despite the owl's warnings, Betty is curious and declares, "I'm going up to see that old man of the mountain." and starts a trek up the mountainside. She passes several people fleeing from the Old Man, including a woman pushing a carriage with her triplets—who look suspiciously like the Old Man of the Mountain.

When Betty gets to the top of the mountain, the Old Man of the Mountain emerges from behind a rock. Over twice as tall as Betty, the Old Man backs the girl into his cave and, as Betty fights off his advances, begins to sing with her a duet of "You Gotta Ho-De-Ho (To Get Along with Me)" (Billy Hill [aka George Brown] and J. Russel Robinson). Betty loosens up and joins in, and the two begin to flirt with each other. After his first verse, the Old Man looms menacingly over Betty. When Betty asks what he's going to do, he says he's "gonna do the best I can" before launching into a jazzy dance routine. The Old Man and Betty continue to dance together, but when the song is over, the Old Man makes a lustful grab for Betty, who runs for her life back down the mountainside.

The Old Man gives chase, and grabs Betty just long enough to catch hold of her dress, which Betty jumps out of. As Betty finds refuge behind a large tree in her underwear, her dress comes to life and slaps the Old Man before running back to its owner. Betty climbs the tree to apparent safety, but as the Old Man comes over and attempts to coax her down with "The Scat Song" (C. Calloway, Frank Perkins and Mitchell Parish), he picks the tree up and bounces it on the ground, causing Betty to slide down.

Before he can have his way with her, however, the animals from the village rally to Betty's aid and surround the Old Man, tying his arms and legs together by a tree. They then proceed to beat him up, tickle and humiliate him, thus exacting revenge for all the times he had made their lives a misery, with Betty watching with glee.

== Cast ==
- Cab Calloway as Old Man of the Mountain / all other voices
- Bonnie Poe as Betty Boop
  - Mae Questel as Betty Boop's singing voice

== Controversy ==
The original rare end card for this cartoon, cut off from the film negative in the fifties.

According to film historian Christopher Lehman, the sexually suggestive nature of this film caused "some Americans at the time, especially Catholics," to complain to exhibitors who then pressured Paramount Studios (distributor of the Betty Boop series) to tone down the Betty Boop character, which subsequently pressured Fleischer Studios to do the same thing. This can be seen when a man in crutches sees Betty and immediately regains the ability to walk, a fish starts to follow her before getting pulled away by his wife, and the titular character removes Betty's dress.

== Reception ==
The Film Daily wrote on July 24, 1933, "To the tune of Cab Calloway's music and vocalizing, this Max Fleischer animated unreels some amusing antics having to do with the kidnapping of Betty Boop by the old man of the mountain and her rescue by the forest animals. A nice subject of its kind, the Calloway musical background being distinctive and the cartoon stuff amusing."

== Notes ==
- The Old Man of the Mountain was the third and last of the Fleischer cartoons pairing Betty Boop and Cab Calloway; the others are Minnie the Moocher and Snow-White. As in the other two cartoons, film footage of Cab Calloway was rotoscoped, or traced into animation, to provide the dance steps for the Old Man during the duet of "You Gotta Ho-De-Ho (To Get Along with Me)".
- The dialogue between Betty and the Old Man ("Whatcha gonna do now?" "Gonna do the best I can!") is mirrored almost exactly in a scene between Santa Claus and Oogie Boogie in the 1993 film The Nightmare Before Christmas. The scene also features music very similar to Calloway's "Minnie the Moocher" and dance steps close to Calloway's own.
