= Swing You Sinners! =

1930 film

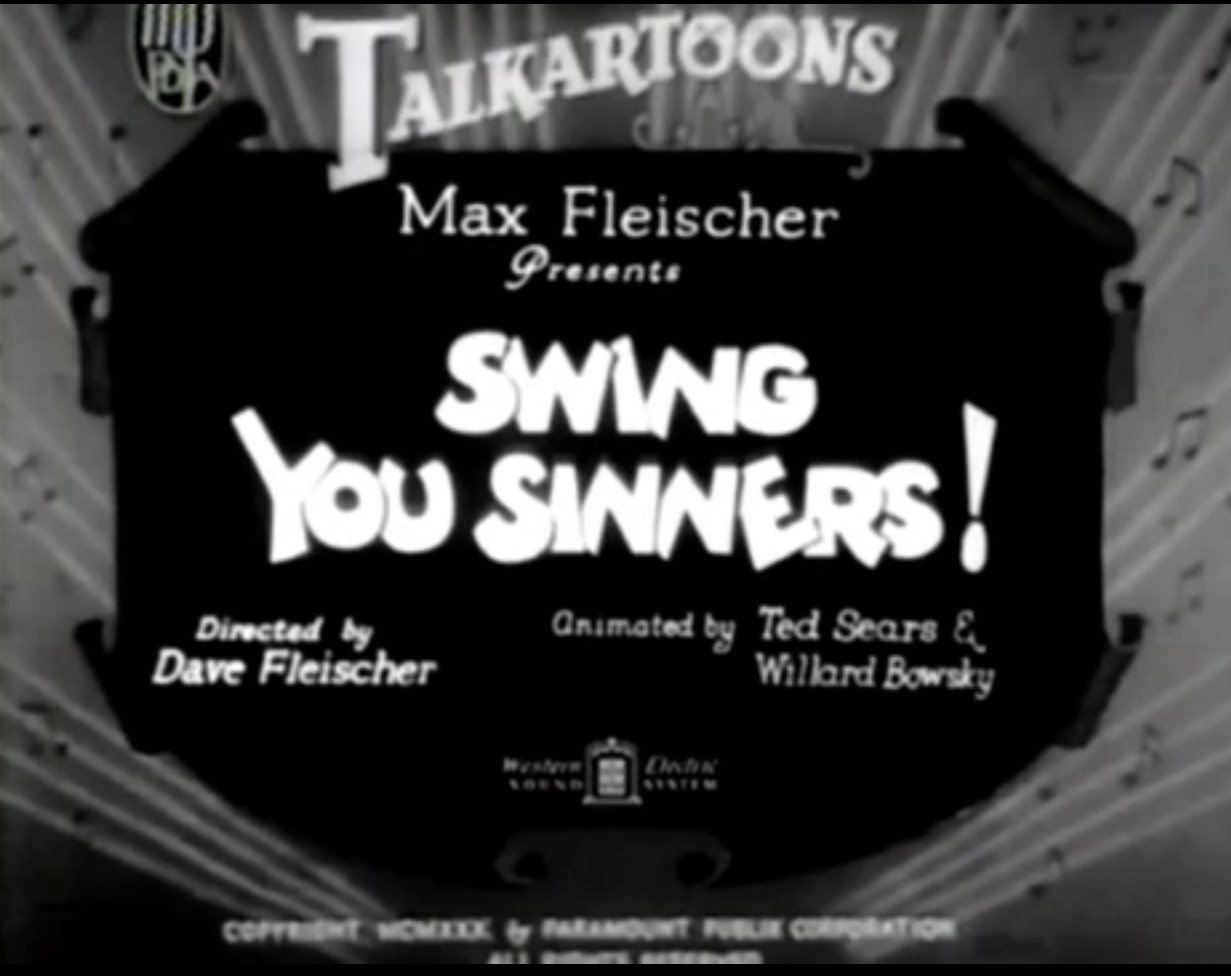
- The title card
- Directed by: Dave Fleischer
- Produced by: Max Fleischer
- Starring: Billy Murray
- Animation by: Willard Bowsky; Ted Sears; George Cannata; Shamus Culhane; Al Eugster; William Henning; Seymour Kneitel; Grim Natwick
- Color process: Black and white
- Production company: Fleischer Studios
- Distributed by: Paramount Publix Corporation
- Release date: September 20, 1930
- Running time: 8 minutes
- Country: United States
- Language: English

Swing You Sinners! is a 1930 American animated short film, directed by Dave Fleischer, and produced by Fleischer Studios as part of the Talkartoons series. The film is notable for its surreal, dark and abstract content. The film was released on September 20, 1930.

The film

== Plot ==
Bimbo is seen late at night, trying to steal a live chicken. After several attempts, he accidentally grabs a policeman by the hand when the latter catches him in the act. As he tries to walk away as if nothing happened, the chicken follows him in spite of this—and so does the policeman trying to arrest him.

Eventually, the chicken and its chicks flee while Bimbo enters a cemetery for refuge. To his horror, however, he finds out that it is haunted, complete with a host of ghosts and other supernatural beings—including various talking animals, skeletons and living objects, and assorted spirits of all shapes and sizes—who tell him that he will be punished soon for the following crimes (which is why the policeman is trying to catch up with him):

1. "Chickens you used to steal." = Theft.
2. "Craps you used to shoot." = Gambling.
3. "Girls you used to chase." = Lust.

Bimbo tries to beg for mercy, but his assurance that he has made efforts to become a better person goes unheeded. And so, throughout the rest of the film, Bimbo is berated and pursued by them until he enters a barn, whereupon the monsters sing about Bimbo's demise, and a huge skull devours him the moment the monsters chase him away toward a cave next.

== Background ==
The film was animated by Ted Sears and Willard Bowsky. George Cannata, Shamus Culhane, Al Eugster, William Henning, Seymour Kneitel and Grim Natwick also worked on it, but are uncredited in the title card. It was animated by a completely new staff who had never worked in animation before, because the studio had to replace some animators who quit. Animator Culhane states in his memoirs that though he created and animated what might be construed a stereotyped caricature of "a Jew with a black beard, huge nose, and a derby," the studio's atmosphere and its mixed ethnic crew made the depiction completely acceptable to all the Jews in the studio. The caricature in question is a reference to Jewish-American comedian Monroe Silver.

== Reception ==
Motion Picture News wrote on October 11, 1930, that "the clever cartoon pen of Max Fleischer again demonstrates itself in this Talkartoon. An off-stage chorus sings the lyrics to the rhythm of the action and the result is usually diverting. The cartoon hero is this time taken into a grave-yard with the absurd results that you might well imagine. Worth a watch."

== Music ==
"Sing, You Sinners" was composed in 1930 by W. Franke Harling, with lyrics by Sam Coslow. The title song was based on Harling and Coslow's song, some of which is played in the titles of the film.

== Legacy ==
John Kricfalusi named it one of his favorite cartoons and played during a retrospective of his personal favorite animated shorts. He also compared it to Walt Disney's The Skeleton Dance (which was also set in a cemetery) and felt Swing You Sinners! was superior.

In 2012 Cracked hosted an article describing "5 Old Children's Cartoons Way Darker Than Most Horror Movies" and listed Swing You Sinners! at No. 1.

In 2014, LA-based indie band Caught A Ghost released a music video to their track "Time Go" which consisted largely of footage from Swing You Sinners!.

Serbian alternative rock band Brigand named their debut album Zaplešimo Grešnici (literally Swing You Sinners in Serbian) after the film.

Video game developers Chad and Jared Moldenhauer based the atmosphere of their game Cuphead on several Fleischer animated short films, including this one. Chad called Fleischer Studios "the magnetic north of his art style." Kill Screen described Fleischer Studios as having "transportive, transformative short films, such as Swing You Sinners!. The in-game achievement for defeating the game's final boss is even named "Swing You Sinner." Additionally, boss Cagney Carnation's idle animation resembles the hand dance done by one of the ghosts in the film.
