= Betty Boop, M.D. =

1932 American animated short film

- Directed by: Dave Fleischer
- Produced by: Max Fleischer
- Starring: Mae Questel
- Animation by: Willard Bowsky; Thomas Goodson
- Color process: Black-and-white
- Production company: Fleischer Studios
- Distributed by: Paramount Pictures
- Release date: September 2, 1932
- Running time: 7 minutes
- Country: United States
- Language: English

Betty Boop, M.D. is a 1932 Fleischer Studios animated short film starring Betty Boop, and featuring Koko the Clown and Bimbo. The animated short is certainly one of the more surreal entries in the Betty Boop filmography.

== Plot ==
Betty, Bimbo and Koko are the owners of a traveling medicine show. They are selling "Jippo", an all-purpose health tonic. Koko's contortionist display doesn't convince the local townsfolk to open their wallets, but Betty's song and dance gets the whole town eager to buy their product. Betty, Koko and Bimbo sell bottles. Drinking the tonic causes everyone to exhibit strange side-effects. A feeble old man drinks some and becomes a large baby, while a baby drinking it becomes an old man. Other effect seen include massive weight gain, unusual hair growth, rapid changes in shape and size, and even death.

The cartoon's ending makes a reference to "Dr. Jekyll and Mr. Hyde", a film adaptation which was released earlier that year by Paramount Pictures.

== Music ==
Betty sings "Now's the Time to Fall in Love" with the words changed to "Now's the time to buy Jippo". An old man's heart sings "Darling, I Am Growing Old-er" from Silver Threads Among the Gold. The animated short features the song "Nobody's Sweetheart", followed by a scat vocal variations. The recording artist was long assumed to be Cliff Edwards a.k.a. "Ukulele Ike"; it is certainly in the style which he made famous. However, some state it was Billy Costello, which wouldn't be unlikely, considering he did the voice acting of later Popeye shorts, and that Costello recorded very good imitations of the "Ukulele Ike" style under the pseudonym "Red Pepper Sam".
