= Little Annie Rooney (1931 film) =

1931 film

- Directed by: Dave Fleischer
- Produced by: Max Fleischer
- Starring: Little Ann Little
- Color process: Black and white
- Production company: Fleischer Studios
- Distributed by: Paramount Pictures
- Release date: October 10, 1931
- Running time: 7:25
- Country: United States
- Language: English

Little Annie Rooney is a short animated film that is part of the Fleischer Studios Screen Songs series. It is based on the 1889 popular song "Little Annie Rooney" and uses it in the soundtrack. The chorus says:

She's my sweetheart, I'm her beau;
She's my Annie, I'm her Joe,
Soon we'll marry, never to part,
Little Annie Rooney is my sweetheart!

Other tunes used in the soundtrack (as instrumentals) include "Yes Sir, That's My Baby" and "Baby's Birthday Party".

== Synopsis ==
The Screen Song starts with the theme of Little Annie Rooney. She returns home to a surprise birthday party. She replies "I'm so Happy", which is similar to Betty Boop's Birthday Party. Annie has a sweetheart, Joe, and they both perform the title song. After the cartoon story, the bouncing ball sing-along segment begins. The background image for the first part of the sing-along is a design of shamrocks and smoking pipes, to indicate an Irish theme. In the second segment, the background image is a statuette of Betty Boop. The third segment returns to cartoon animation interacting with the lyrics in the Fleischer Studios style of the time. At the end, Joe and Little Annie Rooney are married in a church, then the final part of the chorus is sung by the faces of babies who quickly age to adult men then old men, with the lyrics "Little Annie Rooney, is our grand-ma", an indication that the pop-song which debuted over 40 years earlier was an old standard familiar to generations.
