= Betty Boop's Ker-Choo =

1933 American animated short film

- Directed by: Dave Fleischer; Seymour Kneitel (animation)
- Produced by: Max Fleischer
- Starring: Claude Resse (Bimbo); Mae Questel (Betty Boop, singing); Bonnie Poe (Betty Boop); Margie Hines (additional voices)
- Music by: Johnny Green; Sammy Timberg; Jack King
- Animation by: Seymour Kneitel; Bernard Wolf
- Color process: Black and white
- Production company: Fleischer Studios
- Distributed by: Paramount Publix Corporation
- Release date: January 6, 1933
- Running time: 7 minutes
- Country: United States
- Language: English

Betty Boop's Ker-Choo is a 1933 Fleischer Studios animated short film starring Betty Boop, and featuring Koko the Clown and Bimbo.

== Plot ==
Bimbo and Koko are among the contestants in a big auto race, where all the talking animals in Fleischer-land are in attendance (the "humanized" cars await in stalls like horses, and the judge's panel consists of three elderly blind men). The favorite in the race is Betty Boop, but she's late again, and her Yiddish-accented car has no idea where she is. When Betty finally shows up, she explains in song that her tardiness is due to a "'code' in my 'doze'".

Once the race begins, it's a real thriller-spiller, with even the spectators getting into the act—and catching Betty's cold in the process ("Ah, ah, CHOO!)" Eventually, Betty wins the race.

== Notes and comments ==
Betty sings the song "I Got a "Code" in My "Doze"", written by Arthur Fields with lyrics by Fred Hall & Billy Rose.

This short was featured in a Cartoon Network video, synced to Soul Coughing's song "Rolling".
