= Betty Boop's Penthouse =

1933 film

- Directed by: Dave Fleischer
- Produced by: Max Fleischer
- Starring: Mae Questel
- Animation by: Willard Bowsky (as Willard G. Bowsky)
- Color process: Black-and-white
- Production company: Fleischer Studios
- Distributed by: Paramount Pictures
- Release date: March 10, 1933
- Running time: 8 minutes
- Country: United States
- Language: English

Betty Boop's Penthouse is a 1933 Fleischer Studios animated short film featuring Betty Boop assisted by Koko the Clown and Bimbo.

== Plot ==
At Bimbo's Experimental Laboratory, Bimbo and Koko concoct a variety of compounds and elixirs, including a drink that is so hot it turns a black cat into a dragon head, as well as turning the cat into a white and black striped one. Their scientific experiments are interrupted when, through a huge drop of the chemical, they see a bathing-suit-clad Betty taking a shower on the roof of her penthouse.

Distracted by Betty as she sings "Penthouse Serenade", they forget that the chemicals which they have mixed are still on the boil, one of which turns into a Frankenstein-style monster. The creature sees Betty, and crosses over the phone wire to menace her. Although Bimbo and Koko make an effort to stop it from reaching her by cutting the wires using a bird's mouth, the monster defies gravity and reaches the penthouse. Once Betty realizes it's right behind her, she sprays the monster with flower spray, which turns him into a harmless dancing flower. Betty giggles and says, "You're such a nutsy dopesy!"
