= The Male Man =

1931 film

- Directed by: Dave Fleischer
- Produced by: Max Fleischer; Adolph Zukor
- Starring: Billy Murray; Gus Wickie
- Animation by: Ted Sears; Seymour Kneitel
- Color process: Black and white
- Production company: Fleischer Studios
- Distributed by: Paramount Pictures
- Release date: April 24, 1931
- Running time: 5:57
- Language: English

The Male Man is a short theatrical cartoon by Fleischer Studios. It is one of the films in the Talkartoons series, featuring Bimbo.

== Overview ==
The cartoon centers on Bimbo who delivers and works on mail. For some reason, the film is entitled The Male Man as opposed to The Mail Man.

After carrying letters to various recipients, Bimbo delivers one to an abandoned house inhabited by a pack of hooded monsters. One of them pulls him inside and requests him to carry a letter to someone who lives under the sea. Bimbo reluctantly accepts.

Bimbo carries the letter given to him by the hooded monsters. On his way walking on the countryside, the envelope mysteriously grows bigger and bigger, prompting him to drag it. While doing so, he obliviously moves toward a cliff. When he goes on pulling the giant envelope, it tears open, and Bimbo falls off the edge. Bizarrely, smaller envelopes fall out from the torn opening of the big one.

After falling from the cliff, Bimbo plunges into the sea below. Under the water, he finds a house, and sees what at first looks like a siren dancing inside. Finding the resident pretty, Bimbo knocks on the door to greet her. The door opens but it appears the siren is actually a fearsome octopus, much to Bimbo's panic. As the frightened dog runs, the octopus chases him. It also appears the octopus is the intended recipient of the hooded monsters' message as the mollusk picks up the small envelopes that come falling down.

Also featured in the cartoon is the 1929 song Step By Step (also called I'm Marching Home to You). The song was popularized by Walter Van Brunt and Billy Murray.
