= Bimbo's Initiation =

1931 film

- Title card
- Directed by: Dave Fleischer
- Produced by: Max Fleischer
- Starring: Margie Hines; Walter Van Brunt
- Music by: Sammy Timberg
- Animation by: Grim Natwick; Jimmy Culhane (uncredited); Al Eugster (uncredited)
- Color process: Black-and-white
- Production company: Fleischer Studios
- Distributed by: Paramount Publix Corporation
- Release date: July 24, 1931
- Running time: 6 minutes
- Country: United States
- Language: English

Bimbo's Initiation is a 1931 Fleischer Studios Talkartoon animated short film starring Bimbo and featuring an early version of Betty Boop with a dog's ears and nose. It was the final Betty Boop cartoon to be animated by the character's co-creator, Grim Natwick, before he moved to Animated Pictures.

== Plot ==
During the opening credits, a chorus of college fraternity brothers boasts how easily they will induct Bimbo. Bimbo walks down the street whistling "Go In and Out the Window" and suddenly disappears down an open manhole. A Mickey Mouse look-alike quickly locks the manhole after him. He slides down a long chute into the underground clubhouse of a secret society. The leader asks Bimbo if he would like to be a member, but Bimbo refuses and is sent through a series of dangerous trials. After each trial the leader repeats the invitation, but Bimbo still refuses. Finally the leader removes his costume to reveal Betty Boop, who charms Bimbo with a dance. Bimbo accepts the invitation, and the other members of the society reveal that they are look-alikes of Betty. They all celebrate by dancing to the tune of Byron Gay's "The Vamp".

== Analysis and recognitions ==
The surreal, nightmarish atmosphere of Bimbo's Initiation has made it one of the most renowned Fleischer Studios shorts. Leonard Maltin described it as "the 'darkest' of all" the Fleischers' cartoons. In 1994 it was voted #37 of the 50 Greatest Cartoons of all time by members of the animation industry.

The cartoonist Jim Woodring identified Bimbo's Initiation as "one of the things that laid the foundation for my life's philosophy".
