= Betty Boop's Museum =

1932 American animated short film

- Directed by: Dave Fleischer
- Produced by: Max Fleischer
- Starring: Mae Questel
- Music by: Samuel Lerner (uncredited); Sammy Timberg (uncredited)
- Animation by: William Henning; Reuben Timmins (as Reuben Timinsky)
- Color process: Black-and-white
- Production company: Fleischer Studios
- Distributed by: Paramount Pictures
- Release date: December 16, 1932
- Running time: 7 minutes
- Country: United States
- Language: English

Betty Boop's Museum is a 1932 Fleischer Studios animated short film starring Betty Boop, and featuring Koko the Clown and Bimbo.

== Plot ==
Koko is recruiting customers for a 50-cent sightseeing tour of the museum. Betty is Koko's only passenger. Betty gets locked inside by accident. The skeletons from the displays come to life and chase Betty, until she is finally rescued by Bimbo.

== Public domain ==
Unlike many items later created by Fleischer Studios, Betty Boop's Museum became public domain slightly before 2024, and was released in semi-quality distribution.
