= Admission Free =

- Directed by: Dave Fleischer
- Produced by: Max Fleischer
- Starring: Billy Murray; Mae Questel
- Music by: Sammy Timberg
- Animation by: Rudolph Eggeman; Thomas Johnson; Shamus Culhane (uncredited)
- Production company: Fleischer Studios
- Distributed by: Paramount Publix Corporation
- Release date: June 10, 1932
- Running time: 7 minutes
- Country: United States
- Language: English

Admission Free is a 1932 Pre-Code Fleischer Studios Talkartoon animated short film starring Betty Boop and featuring Bimbo and Koko the Clown.

== Synopsis ==
Betty Boop works at a penny arcade. While singing "Change! Come get your pennies! Change! Your ten and twenties!", she gives Koko the Clown change and then Bimbo who flirts with Betty. While Bimbo contemplates images on a machine, a visual and gestural relationship is established between them.

Then Bimbo goes to a shooting gallery, where he will test his aim. When Betty is questioned by a rabbit, Bimbo chases after him, moving the action to a totally different setting: a forest. There, the forest happens to have very curious situations. Betty and Bimbo then ride into the sky on a firework rocket.

== Music ==
Tunes on the soundtrack include "The Bowery" (which is heard at the beginning and at the end), "Shine" (sung by Betty with alternative lyrics), "Oh, You Beautiful Doll", "Where Do You Work-a, John?", "You're Driving Me Crazy", "The Sidewalks of New York", "A-Hunting We Will Go", "Goodnight, Ladies", "Anvil Chorus" from Il trovatore and "A Hot Time in the Old Town".
