= Betty Boop's Birthday Party =

1933 film

- Directed by: Dave Fleischer
- Produced by: Max Fleischer
- Starring: Little Ann Little
- Animation by: Seymour Kneitel; Myron Waldman
- Color process: Black-and-white
- Production company: Fleischer Studios
- Distributed by: Paramount Pictures
- Release date: April 21, 1933
- Running time: 7 minutes
- Country: United States
- Language: English

Betty Boop's Birthday Party is a 1933 Fleischer Studio animated short film, starring Betty Boop and featuring Koko the Clown and Bimbo.

== Plot ==
It's Betty's birthday, but she's in the kitchen washing dishes and wishing she had a man. Betty's pals, including Bimbo and Koko, throw her a party. Yet after two men have a scuffle with a fish, the entire party gets into a fight, leaving the entire party a mess. In the end, Betty rows away with George Washington.
