= Betty Boop's Ups and Downs =

1932 film

- Directed by: Dave Fleischer
- Produced by: Max Fleischer
- Starring: Mae Questel
- Animation by: Willard Bowsky; Ugo D'Orsi
- Color process: Black-and-white
- Production company: Fleischer Studios
- Distributed by: Paramount Pictures
- Release date: October 14, 1932
- Running time: 7 minutes
- Country: United States
- Language: English

Betty Boop's Ups and Downs is a 1932 Fleischer Studios animated short film, starring Betty Boop.

The short subject makes light of the rash of foreclosures and property auctions in the economic turmoil of the Great Depression, together with some of the distinctive surrealism of the Fleischer style of this era.

== Plot ==
A destitute Betty is evicted from her home, which has a "FOR SALE" sign beside it. After Bimbo hauls away Betty and her meager belongings in a horse-drawn cart, the vacant house starts to fall apart. The asking price on the sign goes down with each additional decay, which the chimney itself fixes, until the house is ramshackle and the asking price is "Or what have you?", which frustrates the chimney.

The camera view then pulls back up into the air, showing all the houses in the town also have "For Sale" signs. The view continues up show all of North America "For Sale", and finally the whole Earth is for sale. The Earth goes up for auction with the Moon serving as auctioneer and the planets start bidding, singing to the tune of "London Bridge Is Falling Down". Mars and Venus bid first, but Saturn is the eventual buyer. He pulls a large horse-shoe magnet out from the Earth, eliminating the planet's gravity, just to see what happens. Buildings, trees, animals, and people including Betty start floating into the air with humorous effect. Finally a hand reaches out from the Earth and grabs the magnet back from Saturn. Gravity is restored, and everything and everybody return to the ground. A series of buildings fall atop Betty, but she avoids injury as she emerges from the top of the pile of buildings singing "Any old place upon this Earth is home sweet home to me".
