= I Heard (film) =

1933 film

- Directed by: Dave Fleischer
- Produced by: Max Fleischer
- Starring: Mae Questel
- Music by: Don Redman and his Orchestra
- Animation by: Willard Bowsky; Myron Waldman
- Color process: Black-and-white
- Production company: Fleischer Studios
- Distributed by: Paramount Pictures
- Release date: September 1, 1933
- Running time: 7 minutes
- Country: United States
- Language: English

I Heard is a 1933 Pre-Code Fleischer Studios animated short film starring Betty Boop, and featuring Koko the Clown and Bimbo. The cartoon features music by and a special guest appearance from jazz musician Don Redman and his Orchestra.

== Plot ==
Workers from the Never Mine wash up before eating lunch at Betty Boop's Tavern, where Betty sings and dances while they dine. After lunch is over, the miners all return to work (and reapply their dirt and grime before entering the mine). An excited Bimbo runs around, singing "I Heard", and calls Betty to come down into the mine. She takes the dumbwaiter down, but the cable snaps and plunges to the bottom. The crash leaves her unhurt, but clad only in her lingerie (Bimbo obligingly returns her dress). The two discover a team of ghosts playing a game of baseball, with a cartoon bomb as the ball. Bimbo and Betty head to the surface in the elevator, unwittingly carrying the bomb with them. They send it back down, and the resultant explosion fills all the railroad cars with coal. The ghosts are also blown into the air, and land in graves opened by a laughing Bimbo.

== Notes and comments ==
- Bonnie Poe voices Betty Boop in the opening title, then Mae Questel takes over the full role as Betty Boop until the "Dumb Waiter" elevator scene. Bonnie Poe takes over again as Betty Boop when Betty falls down the mine to meet up with Bimbo.
- Songs in this short include the title track, "How'm I Doin'?", and "I Know a Girl Named Betty Boop", all sung by Don Redman and Mae Questel.
- This short was the last appearance of Bimbo.
