= I'll Be Glad When You're Dead You Rascal You =

1932 film

- Directed by: Dave Fleischer
- Produced by: Max Fleischer
- Starring: Louis Armstrong; Margie Hines
- Music by: Louis Armstrong and Orchestra
- Animation by: Willard Bowsky; Ralph Somerville
- Color process: Black-and-white; colorized in 1972
- Production company: Fleischer Studios
- Distributed by: Paramount Pictures
- Release date: November 25, 1932
- Running time: 7 minutes
- Country: United States
- Language: English

I'll Be Glad When You're Dead You Rascal You is a 1932 American pre-Code Fleischer Studios animated short film starring Betty Boop, and featuring Koko the Clown and Bimbo. The cartoon features music by and a special guest appearance from jazz trumpeter Louis Armstrong and his Orchestra playing "You Rascal You". The title of the film comes from the song, written by Sam Theard in 1931.

== Plot ==
After a live action introduction featuring Louis Armstrong and his orchestra, the short opens in the jungle, with Betty being carried on a litter by Bimbo and Koko. A horde of African savages descends on the trio, and runs off with Betty. Koko and Bimbo try to find the missing Betty, but end up in the cannibals' cooking pot. They climb a tree and escape, but are pursued by the enormous disembodied head of a savage (with the voice and face of Louis Armstrong). Koko and Bimbo eventually find Betty tied to a stake, surrounded by dancing natives. Koko and Bimbo help Betty escape by firing porcupine quills at the savages. The trio races off, hotly pursued by spear-tossing natives. The three finally reach safety after crossing a mountain, the erupting peak of which flings the savages into space.

== Notes and comments ==
- This is one of Louis Armstrong's earliest film appearances. Armstrong and his orchestra perform "High Society Rag", the title song, and "Chinatown". The use of a currently popular musician represented competition with the contemporaneous music library accessibility greatly exploited by animators Hugh Harman and Rudolf Ising, when producing musically-synchronized shorts for the Warner Bros. Merrie Melodies series.
- Thomas Brothers has noted the racist imagery and dialogue in this short film. In addition to the depiction of black people as cannibals and savages, Koko calls the savages "babies", short for "jungle babies". During the vocal chorus, the cannibal's face and Louis Armstrong's face oscillate between one another, associating Armstrong himself with the cannibal characters.
- A speedometer in Koko's tail at one point registers the Hebrew word כּשר (kosher).
