= Bimbo (Fleischer Studios) =

Fictional character

- Talkartoons/Betty Boop character
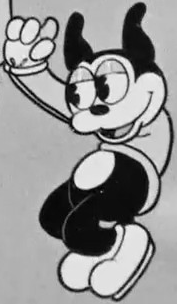
- Bimbo as seen in Betty Boop's Crazy Inventions (1933)
- First appearance: "Bedelia" (1930)
- Last appearance: "The Betty Boop Movie Mystery" (1989)
- Created by: Max Fleischer; Grim Natwick; Sid Marcus; Dick Huemer
- Designed by: Sid Marcus and Grim Natwick (1930); Willard Bowsky (1931 redesign)
- Voiced by: Billy Murray (1930–1931); Claude Reese (1931–1933); Billy Costello (1932; singing voice); Cab Calloway (1933; singing voice); Bradley Barker (1933); Don Redman (1933; singing voice); Dave Swanson (1980); Lionel Wilson (1984); Michael Bell (1989); David Babich (2014)

In-universe information
- Species: Dog
- Gender: Male
- Significant other: Betty Boop (girlfriend)

Bimbo (known as Bimbo The Pup) is a fictional anthropomorphic dog created by animators Max Fleischer, Grim Natwick, Sid Marcus, and Dick Huemer for Fleischer Studios. He is best known for his role in the Betty Boop cartoon series, where he featured as Betty's main love interest. He is described as a generic dog, or a mix of Pug, Boston Terrier, and Bulldog, and was not based on a specific breed. While the early versions of Bimbo varied, the most recognizable appearance is that of a short, round, black dog.

== History ==
Character designs by Grim Natwick, c 1930

Bimbo was initially inspired by animation director Dick Huemer's work on Mutt and Jeff, who, when working on the Out of the Inkwell series, decided to give Out of the Inkwell protagonist Koko the Clown a canine companion named Fitz.

Bimbo made his first appearance in Hot Dog (1930) as the protagonist and star of Fleischer's Talkartoons series. He was gradually developed into an amoral everyman to compete with Walt Disney Productions' Mickey Mouse, allowing the character to become popular while Koko the Clown languished in legal turmoil over rights issues. He starred in several famous cartoon shorts of the 1930s, most notably Swing You Sinners!, Minnie the Moocher and Bimbo's Initiation, eventually reuniting with Koko when Albert Weiss gave up rights to the character.

Bimbo was later paired with Betty Boop, a female dog similar to Minnie Mouse, who gained unexpected stardom and popularity to the point Bimbo and Koko were overshadowed.

After Hays Code censorship rules began to strictly get enforced in 1934, Bimbo disappeared from future Fleischer cartoons of the era, due to the implications of an anthropomorphic dog dating a human girlfriend being considered too risqué. Coupled with the fact that everymen like Mickey Mouse, Oswald the Lucky Rabbit and Bosko lost their appeal to the audience, Bimbo was quickly retired in 1933 in favor of the Betty Boop and Popeye the Sailor series, According to Myron Waldman, the character of Pudgy would be created as a replacement for Bimbo the Dog due to his hatred for Bimbo, stating:

Bimbo was a big mutt and he spoke and he didn't go well with Betty Boop, you know. I never liked him.

— Betty Boop: The Queen of Cartoons

== Revival ==
About 56 years after his first absence from cartoons, Bimbo made a reappearance in 1989 as a major co-star in the TV special The Betty Boop Movie Mystery and in First Publishing's 1990 comic Betty Boop's Big Break with more of his original personality intact as a love interest of Betty. He has continued to appear in various Betty Boop merchandise since then and has been reestablished as a mainstay of the series.

In 2016, he appeared in Dynamite's Betty Boop comic mini-series as Betty's best friend with a secret crush on her. He later appeared in the iOS game Betty Boop Dance Card in a 3D look, voiced by David Babich.

== Filmography ==
All films were directed by Dave Fleischer.

Title	Animation	Release Date	Film
Bedelia	Unknown	1930-01-04	
I'm Afraid to Go Home in the Dark	Unknown	1930-01-30	
The Prisoner's Song	Unknown	1930-03-01	
Hot Dog	Unknown	1930-03-29	
La Paloma	Unknown	1930-04-12	
Fire Bugs	Ted Sears	1930-05-09	
Dizzy Dishes	Grim Natwick	1930-08-09	
Barnacle Bill	Rudy Zamora	1930-08-31	
Swing You Sinners!	Ted Sears	1930-09-24	
Strike Up the Band	Al Eugster	1930-09-26	
Grand Uproar	Seymour Kneitel	1930-10-03	
My Gal Sal	Willard Bowsky	1930-10-18	
Sky Scraping	Ted Sears	1930-11-01	
Up to Mars	Rudy Zamora	1930-11-20	
On a Sunday Afternoon	Rudy Zamora	1930-11-29	
Accordion Joe	Grim Natwick	1930-12-12	
Row, Row, Row	Seymour Kneitel	1930-12-20	
Mysterious Mose	Willard Bowsky	1930-12-26	
Ace of Spades	Rudy Zamora	1931-01-16	
Tree Saps	Grim Natwick	1931-02-03	
Teacher's Pest	Grim Natwick	1931-02-07	
I'd Climb the Highest Mountain	Seymour Kneitel	1931-03-07	
The Cow's Husband	Shamus Culhane	1931-03-13	
Somebody Stole My Gal	George Cannata	1931-03-20	
The Bum Bandit	Willard Bowsky	1931-04-03	
The Male Man	Ted Sears	1931-04-24	
Twenty Legs Under the Sea	Willard Bowsky	1931-05-05	
Alexander's Ragtime Band	Shamus Culhane	1931-05-09	
Silly Scandals	Grim Natwick	1931-05-23	
My Wife's Gone to the Country	Unknown	1931-05-31	
The Herring Murder Case	Shamus Culhane	1931-06-26	
Bimbo's Initiation	Grim Natwick	1931-07-24	
Bimbo's Express	Unknown	1931-08-22	
Minding the Baby	Shamus Culhane	1931-09-26	
Little Annie Rooney	Unknown	1931-10-10	
In the Shade of the Old Apple Sauce	Unknown	1931-10-16	Lost film.
Mask-A-Raid	Al Eugster	1931-11-07	
By the Light of the Silvery Moon	Seymour Kneitel	1931-11-14	
Jack and the Beanstalk	Dave Fleischer	1931-11-21	
Dizzy Red Riding Hood	Grim Natwick	1931-12-12	
Any Rags?	Willard Bowsky	1932-01-12	
Boop-Oop-a-Doop	Dave Fleischer	1932-01-16	
The Robot	Dave Fleischer	1932-02-05	
Wait Till the Sun Shines, Nellie	Seymour Kneitel		
Minnie the Moocher	Willard Bowsky	1932-02-26	
Swim or Sink (S.O.S.)	Seymour Kneitel	1932-03-11	
Crazy Town	Shamus Culhane	1932-03-25	
The Dancing Fool	Seymour Kneitel	1932-04-08	
Chess-Nuts	Shamus Culhane	1932-04-13	
A Hunting We Will Go	Al Eugster	1932-04-29	
Let Me Call You Sweetheart	Shamus Culhane	1932-05-20	
Hide and Seek	Roland Crandall	1932-05-26	
Admission Free	Thomas Johnson	1932-06-10	
The Betty Boop Limited	Willard Bowsky	1932-07-01	
Stopping the Show	Roland Crandall		
Betty Boop's Bizzy Bee	Seymour Kneitel	1932-08-19	
Betty Boop, M.D.	Willard Bowsky	1932-09-02	
Betty Boop's Ups and Downs	Willard Bowsky	1932-10-14	
Romantic Melodies	Seymour Kneitel	1932-10-21	
Betty Boop for President	Seymour Kneitel	1932-11-04	
I'll Be Glad When You're Dead You Rascal You	Willard Bowsky	1932-11-25	
Betty Boop's Museum	William Henning	1932-12-16	
Snow White	Roland Crandall	1933-03-31	
Betty Boop's Ker-Choo	Seymour Kneitel	1933-01-06	
Betty Boop's Crazy Inventions	Willard Bowsky	1933-01-27	
Is My Palm Read	Dave Tendlar	1933-02-17	
Betty Boop's Penthouse	Willard Bowsky	1933-03-10	
Betty Boop's Birthday Party	Seymour Kneitel	1933-04-21	
Betty Boop's May Party	Dave Tendlar	1933-05-12	
Song Shopping	Willard Bowsky	1933-05-19	
Betty Boop's I Heard	Willard Bowsky	1933-09-01	
