= Ha! Ha! Ha! (film) =

- Directed by: Dave Fleischer
- Produced by: Max Fleischer
- Starring: Mae Questel
- Animation by: Seymour Kneitel; Roland Crandall
- Color process: Black-and-white
- Production company: Fleischer Studios
- Distributed by: Paramount Pictures
- Release date: March 2, 1934
- Running time: 7 minutes
- Country: United States
- Language: English

Ha! Ha! Ha! is a 1934 Fleischer Studio animated short film starring Betty Boop, and featuring Koko the Clown.

== Plot ==
Max Fleischer draws Betty, then leaves her for the night in the studio at 5:00 pm. Koko escapes from the inkwell and helps himself to a candy bar left behind by Max. He starts to eat some of it. But, he soon gets a toothache. Betty tries to perform some amateur dentistry on Koko, by trying to yank the bad tooth out while dancing. After this fails, she attempts to calm him down but uses too much laughing gas, causing Betty and Koko to laugh hysterically. The laughing gas spreads the room, making a cuckoo clock and a typewriter laugh hysterically. The laughing gas then goes out the window and spreads into town. Both people and inanimate objects begin laughing hysterically, including a mailbox, a parking meter, a bridge, cars, and even gravestones. The short ends when Betty and Koko get back in the inkwell and it begins laughing, before panting.

== Production notes ==
This is a partial remake of the 1924 Koko animated short, The Cure. It is also Koko's last theatrical appearance. (For more information about Koko, see Koko the Clown).
