= The Betty Boop Movie Mystery =

1989 American film

Betty Boop Movie Mystery
- Directed by: George Evelyn Animation Director: John Hays
- Written by: Ali Marie Matheson
- Starring: Melissa Fahn; Lucille Bliss; Michael Bell
- Music by: Gregory Jones
- Production companies: BIG Pictures; King Features Entertainment
- Distributed by: Hearst Entertainment
- Release date: June 25, 1989
- Running time: 24 minutes
- Country: United States
- Language: English

The Betty Boop Movie Mystery (also known as Betty Boop's Hollywood Mystery) is a 1989 animated special starring Betty Boop.

== Story ==
The story is set in the 1930s, reflecting on the original Max Fleischer style of animation. Betty works as a waitress in a diner with her friends Bimbo the musical dog and Koko the Clown. Betty and her friends entertain the customers with a Hawaiian hula revue. The trio are seen entertaining the customers by Diner Dan who owns the diner; he gets very angry and fires Betty and her friends. While searching for a new job they bump into detective Sam Slade, who hires Betty and her pals to go undercover for him as musical detectives to keep an eye on Hollywood movie star Lola DaVille's diamond necklace. The lights go out and Lola's necklace is stolen. Betty is left holding the smoke gun, the police arrest Betty, and she is carted off to jail. Bimbo and Koko break Betty out of jail, then head over to Moolah Studios where they find out that Lola's secretary, Miss Green, was behind the robbery, and that her accomplice was the detective Sam Slade. The pursuit ends on a Busby Berkeley set, Lola DaVille receives her diamond necklace and Sam Slade and Miss Green are both arrested by the police. A singing telegram from Betty's old boss, Diner Dan, pleads Betty and her friends to return to the diner, to which Betty agrees. Betty then finishes the story by singing "You don't have to be a star to be a star," and says the best place to be is with your friends.

== Cast ==
- Melissa Fahn as Betty Boop
- Lucille Bliss as Miss Green
- Hamilton Camp as Maxwell Movieola
- Jodi Carlisle as Lola DaVille
- Michael Bell as Bimbo
- William Farmer as Prop Man
- Toby Gleason
- Gregory Jones
- Randi Merzon
- Roger Rose
- James Ward
