= Bimbo's Express =

1931 film

- Directed by: Dave Fleischer
- Produced by: Max Fleischer
- Starring: Claude Reese; Margie Hines; Maurice Chevalier
- Production company: Fleischer Studios
- Distributed by: Paramount Publix Corporation
- Release date: August 22, 1931
- Running time: 7 minutes
- Country: United States
- Language: English

Bimbo's Express is a 1931 Fleischer Studios Talkartoon animated short film starring Bimbo and Betty Boop.

== Synopsis ==
Bimbo shows up at Betty's door with his assistants to help Betty move from her house. Bimbo takes one glance at Betty, and falls in love with her. Bimbo then sings "Hello Beautiful" to Betty in Maurice Chevalier's voice. They then load up the moving van with all of her belongings (even the stairs) and Betty sits up into the driver's seat with Bimbo. She then moves "around the corner".

== Cast ==
- Claude Reese - Bimbo
- Margie Hines - Betty Boop
- Maurice Chevalier - Bimbo (singing)
