= Finding His Voice =

1929 film

- The short film
- Directed by: F. Lyle Goldman; Max Fleischer
- Written by: W. E. Erpi
- Produced by: Western Electric
- Starring: Billy Murray; Walter Van Brunt; Carlyle Ellis
- Color process: Black and white
- Production company: Fleischer Studios
- Distributed by: Western Electric
- Release date: June 21, 1929
- Running time: 10 minutes 38 seconds
- Country: United States
- Language: English

Finding His Voice is a short film created as an instructional film on how the Western Electric sound-on-film recording system worked. Recording stars Billy Murray and Walter Van Brunt, uncredited, provide the speaking and singing voices. Murray also provided the voice for the Fleischer Studios character Bimbo.

== Plot ==
A live-action hand draws a strip of (sound) film, which takes the form of a human head and uses musical notes to form a body. Then, he sings notes that create a xylophone. Then, he performs a short solo until another piece of film (silent) jumps on him. The talking strip yells, "Hey, Mute! What's the big idea, busting up my act?" The silent piece uses sign language, with subtitles above, asking him about his voice's origin. He talks about a man named "Dr. Western" that gave him "a set of vocal cords", saying he needs to see him, too.

They go to his office, with "Talkie" telling him to put "'Mutie' through the 'works.'" They go on a filming set, where Talkie sings "Love's Old Sweet Song." Then, Dr. Western explains every step of the Western Electric process of sound recording, and Mutie finally earns his voice as Talkie is performing his song. He jumps onto the stage and disrupts his solo. He asks him to calm down, and they perform "Goodnight, Ladies" as they sail on a boat, with the awkward ending of a whale eating the boat and an advertisement for Western Electric.

== Production background ==
Late in 1926, AT&T and Western Electric created a licensing division, Electrical Research Products Inc. (ERPI), to handle the company's film-related audio technology rights. (In Finding His Voice, the credits give W. E. Erpi as the story's author.)

The Warner Brothers sound-on-disc system Vitaphone still had legal exclusivity, but having lapsed in its royalty payments, effective control of the rights was in ERPI's hands. On December 31, 1926—just four months after the premiere of the first Vitaphone feature Don Juan—Warners granted Fox-Case a sublicense for using the Western Electric system. In exchange for the sublicense, Warners and ERPI received a share of Fox's related revenues. The patents of all three concerns were cross-licensed. Superior recording and amplification technology were now available to two Hollywood studios, pursuing two very different methods of sound reproduction.

Although the film explained the Fox-Case sound-on-film system, when the film was initially released, the sound was provided by the Western Electric sound-on-disc system.

Co-director F. Lyle Goldman had done the animation for Wireless Telephony (1921) and The Mystery Box (1922) for the Bray Studios and released by Goldwyn Pictures, and The Ear (1920) for International Film Service and released by Paramount Pictures.

== See also ==
- RCA Photophone
- Fox Movietone
- Phonofilm
- Sound film
- Vitaphone

== Bibliography ==
- Douglas Gomery, The Coming of Sound: A History (New York and Oxon, UK: Routledge, 2005) ISBN 0-415-96900-X
