= Minnie the Moocher (film) =

1932 film

- Original opening card
- Directed by: Dave Fleischer
- Produced by: Max Fleischer
- Starring: Cab Calloway and His Orchestra; Mae Questel; Margie Hines
- Animation by: Willard Bowsky; Ralph Somerville; Bernard Wolf
- Color process: Black-and-white
- Production company: Fleischer Studios
- Distributed by: Paramount Pictures
- Release dates: January 1, 1932 (New York City); February 26, 1932 (general release)
- Running time: 8 minutes
- Country: United States
- Language: English

Minnie the Moocher is a 1932 cartoon starring Betty Boop and Bimbo, and featuring Cab Calloway and his orchestra, singing the namesake hit song.

Part of the Talkartoon series produced by Fleischer Studios and released by Paramount Pictures, it premiered in New York City on January 1, 1932 at the Rivoli Theatre (being shown alongside Dr. Jekyll and Mr. Hyde), going into general release on February 26 of that year.

The short is considered to be one of the most significant cartoons ever, playing an important part on building up the popularity of Betty Boop, as well as reinventing the rotoscope process, which had been invented by Fleischer almost two decades before, but had fallen in disuse from the mid-1920s onwards. In 1994, Minnie the Moocher was voted #20 of the 50 Greatest Cartoons of all time by members of the animation field.

== Plot ==
The cartoon opens with a live action sequence of Cab Calloway and his orchestra performing an instrumental rendition of "St. James Infirmary".

Betty Boop is scolded by her strict German immigrant parents for not eating her hasenpfeffer dish. While her father's head turns into a phonograph as a result of his blabbering, a flower tries to convince Betty to eat her dinner, only to die after eating a bite. Betty then storms out sobbing (while her mother changes cylinders on Papa's phonograph head) and sings the Harry Von Tilzer song "They Always Pick on Me" as she heads to her bedroom and decides to run away from home.

Betty then writes a farewell note to her parents while the song "Mean to Me" plays in the background (Koko the Clown makes a brief cameo popping out of an inkwell, in a nod to the old Out of the Inkwell cartoons) and phones her boyfriend Bimbo, who joins her. Walking through the countryside as night falls, they both come across some specters and venture in a cavern out of fright. Inside, they find a walrus-like apparition (voiced by and rotoscoped to Calloway), who sings "Minnie the Moocher" with some haunted spirits. Betty and Bimbo both change their minds about running away and rush back home with the ghouls in hot pursuit as "Tiger Rag" plays in the background. Betty makes it safely back to her home and hides under the blankets of her bed. As she shakes in terror, the note she earlier wrote to her parents tears, leaving "Home Sweet Home" on it.

The film ends with Calloway and his band performing the instrumental "Vine Street Blues".

== Cast ==
- Mae Questel/Margie Hines as Betty Boop
- Margie Hines as Betty's mother
- Claude Reese as Bimbo
- William Pennell as Betty's father
- Cab Calloway and His Cotton Club Orchestra as Cavern Monsters

== Reception ==
The Film Daily, on January 10, 1932, wrote: "This Max Fleischer musical cartoon is one of the best turned out so far with the cute pen-and-ink star, Betty Boop, who seems to be getting more sexy and alluring each time, and her boyfriend, Bimbo. The musical portion is supplied by Cab Calloway and his orchestra, and what these boys can't do to the 'Minnie the Moocher' number isn't worth mentioning. Cab and his boys are shown only for a brief moment at the opening. Then a cartoon character, a big walrus with serpentine hips, performs the gyrations to the tune of the 'Minnie' song. The effect is short of a knockout, especially to those who are familiar with Cab's stuff on the radio or stage or night club. Betty Boop's part in the action concerns her running away from home because of her bad parents. With Bimbo she goes into a cave, where spooky figures and eerie noise give them such a scare that they beat it back home".

== Notes ==
- Clips of the redrawn colorized version were used in the compilation film Betty Boop for President: The Movie (1980).
