= Snow-White (1933 film) =

- Directed by: Dave Fleischer
- Produced by: Max Fleischer
- Starring: Mae Questel; Billy Murray; Cab Calloway (vocal chorus)
- Animation by: Roland Crandall
- Color process: Black and white
- Production company: Fleischer Studios
- Distributed by: Paramount Pictures
- Release date: March 31, 1933
- Running time: 7 mins
- Language: English

Snow-White (also known as Betty Boop in Snow-White) is a 1933 American animated short in the Betty Boop series from Max Fleischer's Fleischer Studios. Dave Fleischer was credited as director, although virtually all the animation was done by Roland Crandall, who received the opportunity to make Snow-White on his own as a reward for his several years of devotion to the Fleischer studio. The resulting film, which took six months to complete, is considered both Crandall's masterwork and an important milestone of the Golden age of American animation.

== Synopsis ==
A magic mirror resembling Cab Calloway proclaims Betty Boop to be "the fairest in the land", much to the anger of the Queen. The Queen orders her guards Bimbo and Koko to execute Betty. With tears in their eyes, they take Betty into the forest; as they prepare to execute her, they spare her by destroying their weapons, but fall into a pit before they can free her. Betty escapes into a frozen river, which encloses her in a coffin of ice. This block slips downhill to the home of the Seven Dwarfs, who carry the frozen Betty into an enchanted cave, running into Koko and Bimbo. The evil Queen, now transformed into a witch, turns Koko into a ghost as he sings "St. James Infirmary Blues". With her rivals disposed of, the Queen again asks the magic mirror who the fairest in the land is, but the mirror explodes in a puff of magic smoke that returns Betty and Koko to their normal states and changes the Queen into a hideous and mysterious dragon-like monster. The dragon-like monster chases the protagonists until Bimbo grabs its tongue and yanks it, turning the creature inside out and causing it to flee away. Betty, Koko, and Bimbo dance around in a circle of victory as the film ends.

== Legacy ==
Koko's dancing (including some moves that look like the much later "moonwalk" and "dab") during the "St. James" number is rotoscoped from footage of Cab Calloway.

The film was deemed "culturally significant" by the United States Library of Congress and selected for preservation in the National Film Registry in 1994. The same year, it was voted #19 of the 50 Greatest Cartoons of all time by members of the animation field. The film is copyrighted by Paramount due to its copyright being renewed in 1961.

== See also ==
- Snow White
- Snow White and the Seven Dwarfs
