= Rotoscoping =

Animation technique

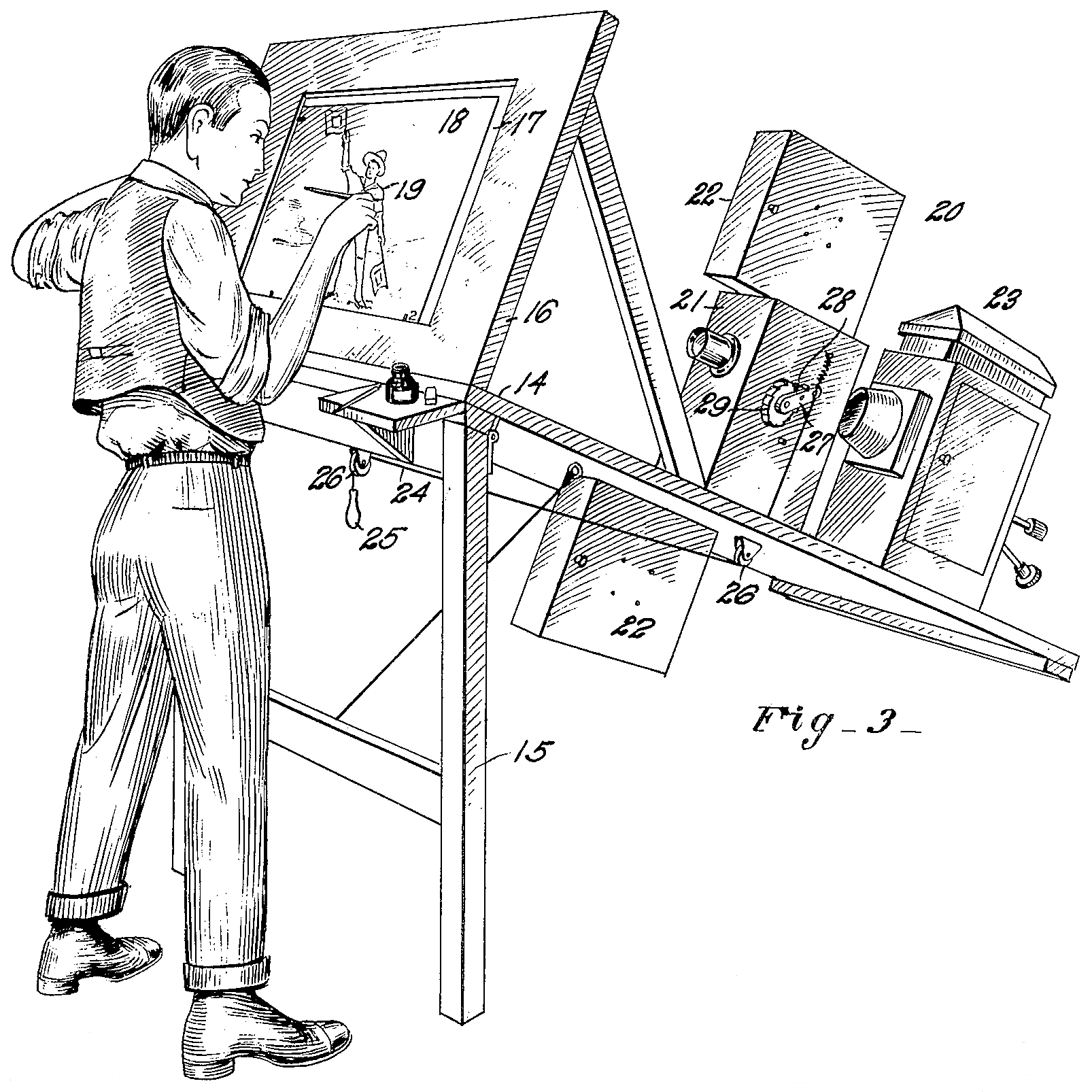
Patent drawing for Max Fleischer's original rotoscope. The artist is drawing on a transparent easel, onto which the film projector at the right is beaming an image of a single film frame.

Rotoscoping is an animation technique that animators use to trace over motion picture footage, frame by frame, to produce realistic action. Originally, live-action film images were projected onto a glass panel and traced onto paper. This projection equipment is referred to as a rotoscope, developed by Polish-American animator Max Fleischer. This device was eventually replaced by computers, but the process is still called rotoscoping.

In the visual effects industry, rotoscoping refers to the technique of manually creating a matte for an element on a live-action plate so it may be composited over another background.

== Technique ==
A GIF of a horse's gallop, traced from an 1878 series of photographs by Eadweard Muybridge

Animation of Muybridge's images engraved on metal discs

Rotoscoping has often been used as a tool for visual effects in live-action films. By tracing an object, the filmmaker creates a silhouette (called a matte) that can be used to extract that object from a scene for use on a different background. Rotoscoping in the digital domain is often aided by motion-tracking and onion-skinning software. Rotoscoping is often used in the preparation of garbage mattes for other matte-pulling processes.

Rotoscoping has also been used to create a special visual effect (such as a glow, for example) that is guided by the matte or rotoscoped line. A classic use of traditional rotoscoping was in the original three Star Wars films, where the production used it to create the glowing lightsaber effect with a matte based on sticks held by the actors. To achieve this, effects technicians traced a line over each frame with the prop, then enlarged each line and added the glow.

While blue-screen and green-screen techniques (Chroma key) have made the process of layering subjects in scenes easier, rotoscoping still plays a large role in the production of visual effects imagery.

== History ==
=== Predecessors ===
Eadweard Muybridge had some of his famous chronophotographic sequences painted on glass discs for the zoopraxiscope projector that he used in his popular lectures between 1880 and 1895. The first discs were painted on the glass in dark contours. Discs made between 1892 and 1894 had outlines drawn by Erwin Faber photographically printed on the disc and then colored by hand, but these discs were probably never used in the lectures.

By 1902, Nuremberg toy companies Gebrüder Bing and Ernst Plank were offering chromolithographed film loops for their toy kinematographs. The films were traced from live-action film footage.

=== Early works and Fleischer's exclusivity ===
The rotoscope technique was invented by animator Max Fleischer in 1915, and used in his groundbreaking Out of the Inkwell animated series (1918–1927). It was known simply as the "Fleischer Process" on the early screen credits, and was essentially exclusive to Fleischer for several years. The live-film reference for the character, later known as Koko the Clown, was performed by his brother (Dave Fleischer) dressed in a clown costume.

Conceived as a shortcut to animating, the rotoscope process proved time-consuming due to the precise and laborious nature of tracing. Rotoscoping is achieved by two methods, rear projection and front surface projection. In either case, the results can have slight deviations from the true line due to the separation of the projected image and the surface used for tracing. Misinterpretations of the forms cause the line to wiggle, and the roto tracings must be reworked over an animation disc, using the tracings as a guide where consistency and solidity are important.

Fleischer ceased to depend on the rotoscope for fluid action by 1924, when Dick Huemer became the animation director and brought his animation experience from his years on the Mutt and Jeff series. Fleischer returned to rotoscoping in the 1930s for referencing intricate dance movements in his Popeye and Betty Boop cartoons. The most notable of these are the dance routines originating from jazz performer Cab Calloway in Minnie the Moocher (1932), Snow-White (1933), and The Old Man of the Mountain (1933). In these examples, the roto tracing was used as a guide for timing and positioning, while the cartoon characters of different proportions were drawn to conform to those positions.

Fleischer's last applications of the rotoscope were for the realistic human animation required for the lead character—among others—in Gulliver's Travels (1939), and the human characters in his last feature, Mr. Bug Goes to Town (1941). His most effective use of rotoscoping was in the action-oriented film noir Superman series of the early 1940s, where realistic movement was achieved on a level unmatched by conventional cartoon animation.

Contemporary uses of the rotoscope and its inherent challenges have included surreal effects in music videos such as Elvis Costello's "Accidents Will Happen" (1978), Klaatu's "Routine Day" (1979), Lawrence Gowan's "A Criminal Mind" (1985), A-ha's "Take On Me" (1985), the live performance scenes in Dire Straits' "Money for Nothing" (1985), Kansas' "All I Wanted" (1986), and the animated TV series Delta State (2004). In the experimental 1973 short Hunger by Peter Foldes, every 12th frame of the footage of a gogo dancer was rotoscoped, with all the inbetweening done by software.

=== Uses by other studios ===
Fleischer's patent expired by 1934, and other producers could then use rotoscoping freely. Walt Disney and his animators used the technique extensively in Snow White and the Seven Dwarfs in order to make the human characters' motions more realistic. The film went significantly over budget due to the complexity of the animation.

Rotoscoping was a popular technique in early animated films made in the Soviet Union. Most films produced with it were adaptations of folk tales or poems—for example, The Night Before Christmas or The Tale of the Fisherman and the Fish. Only during the early 1960s, after the "Khrushchev Thaw", did animators start to explore very different aesthetics.

The makers of the Beatles' Yellow Submarine used rotoscoping in the "Lucy in the Sky with Diamonds" sequence. Director Martin Scorsese used rotoscoping to remove a large chunk of cocaine hanging from Neil Young's nose in his rock documentary The Last Waltz.

Ralph Bakshi used rotoscoping extensively for his animated features Wizards (1977), The Lord of the Rings (1978), American Pop (1981), Fire and Ice (1983), and Cool World (1992). Bakshi first used rotoscoping because 20th Century Fox refused his request for a $50,000 budget increase to finish Wizards; he resorted to the rotoscope technique to finish the battle sequences.

Rotoscoping was also used in Tom Waits For No One (1979), a short film made by John Lamb, Heavy Metal (1981), What Have We Learned, Charlie Brown? (1983) and It's Flashbeagle, Charlie Brown (1984); the Dire Straits "Brothers in Arms" (1985), three of A-ha's music videos, "Take On Me" (1985), "The Sun Always Shines on T.V." (1985), and "Train of Thought" (1986); Don Bluth's The Secret of NIMH (1982), An American Tail (1986), Harry and the Hendersons (closing credits), The BFG (1989), Titan A.E. (2000); and Nina Paley's Sita Sings the Blues (2008).

In 1994, Smoking Car Productions invented a digital rotoscoping process to develop its critically acclaimed adventure video game The Last Express. The process was awarded US patent 6061462, Digital Cartoon and Animation Process. The game was designed by Jordan Mechner, who had used rotoscoping extensively in his previous games Karateka and Prince of Persia.

During the mid-1990s, Bob Sabiston, an animator and computer scientist veteran of the Massachusetts Institute of Technology (MIT) Media Lab, developed a computer-assisted "interpolated rotoscoping" process, which he used to make his award-winning short film "Snack and Drink". Director Richard Linklater subsequently employed Sabiston and his proprietary rotoscope software in the full-length feature films Waking Life (2001) and A Scanner Darkly (2006). Linklater licensed the same proprietary rotoscoping process for the look of both films. Linklater was the first director to use digital rotoscoping to create an entire feature film. Additionally, a 2005–08 advertising campaign by Charles Schwab used Sabiston's rotoscoping work for a series of television commercials, with the tagline "Talk to Chuck". The Simpsons used rotoscope as a couch gag in the episode Barthood (an episode which parodied Linklater's film Boyhood), with Lisa describing it as "a noble experiment that failed".

In 2013, the anime The Flowers of Evil used rotoscoping to produce a look that differed greatly from its manga source material. Viewers criticized the show's shortcuts in facial animation, its reuse of backgrounds, and the liberties it took with realism. Despite this, critics lauded the film, and the website Anime News Network awarded it a perfect score for initial reactions.

In early 2015, the anime film The Case of Hana & Alice (animated prequel to the 2004 live-action film, Hana and Alice) was entirely animated with Rotoshop. It was far better received than The Flowers of Evil, with critics praising its rotoscoping. In 2015, Kowabon, a short-form horror anime series using rotoscoping, aired on Japanese TV.

The Spine of Night (2021), a feature-length fantasy film directed by Philip Gelatt and Morgan Galen King was rotoscope animated. King's Gorgonaut Studios had previously rotoscope animated a series of short fantasy films.

In 2023, Lunark, a retro-style cinematic platformer developed by Johan Vinet of Canari Games, was released. The title draws inspiration from classic games such as Prince of Persia, Another World, and Flashback, and makes extensive use of rotoscoping techniques for its cinematics. In 2025, Lester, a rotoscoping editor designed to automatically propagate artwork from a reference frame to subsequent frames in a video, was released.

== See also ==
- Rotoshop, an image editing software employing interpolated rotoscoping
- Tracing (art)
- Motion capture
- List of rotoscoped works
