= Go In and Out the Window =

English singing game

"Go In and Out the Window" (or "Round the Village") is an English singing game. It has Roud Folk Song Index 734. Documented since the late 19th century, the game was assumed to be an expression of an earlier adult tradition, such as a courtship dance. Later study discounts this idea and regards singing games as specifically a child activity.

== Description ==
One player is chosen as the leader, and the others stand in a fixed circle and sing. The game repeats a series of stages corresponding to the verses of the song. Each verse repeats the same call three times, followed by a coda:

Round and round the village,
Round and round the village,
Round and round the village,
As we have done before.

An early study found that the following stages were the most common:

Round and round the village
The leader walks around the outside of the ring.
In and out the windows
The leader weaves in and out of the ring under the singers' raised arms.
Stand and face your partner
The leader stops inside the ring and chooses a partner.
Follow me to London
The partner leaves the ring.

What happens after the partner leaves the ring varies. The partner might follow the leader around the outside of the ring, or run away until tagged by the leader, then take over as leader for the next round. Sometimes the partner joins hands with the leader, forming a line of dancers that grows longer with each round. In some versions, the players initially divide into two teams — one forming the ring, the other a line of dancers — and "follow me to London" is replaced with a brief couple dance involving both teams.
