= Mr. Bug Goes to Town =

1941 animated feature film directed by Dave Fleischer

- Theatrical release poster
- Directed by: Dave Fleischer; Animation directors: Willard Bowsky; Myron Waldman; Thomas Johnson; David Tendlar; James Culhane; H.C. Ellison; Stan Quackenbush; Graham Place
- Screenplay by: Dan Gordon; Tedd Pierce; Isadore Sparber; Graham Place; Bob Wickersham; William Turner; Carl Meyer; Cal Howard
- Story by: Dave Fleischer; Dan Gordon; Tedd Pierce; Isadore Sparber
- Produced by: Max Fleischer
- Starring: Kenny Gardner; Gwen Williams; Jack Mercer; Tedd Pierce; Carl Meyer; Stan Freed; Pauline Loth
- Music by: Leigh Harline (score); Frank Loesser (lyrics); Hoagy Carmichael (songs); Sammy Timberg (songs)
- Production company: Fleischer Studios
- Distributed by: Paramount Pictures
- Release date: December 4, 1941; (Initial Screening)
- Running time: 78 minutes
- Country: United States
- Language: English
- Budget: $1 million
- Box office: $241,000

Mr. Bug Goes to Town (also known as Hoppity Goes to Town and Bugville) is a 1941 American animated musical comedy film produced by Fleischer Studios and released by Paramount Pictures. It was the second and final feature-length film from Fleischer Studios (following Gulliver's Travels in 1939), the sixth animated film produced by an American studio, and the first based largely on an original story. Mr. Bug was envisioned originally as an adaptation of Maurice Maeterlinck's 1901 novel The Life of the Bee, but Paramount was unwilling to purchase the rights from Samuel Goldwyn.

Mr. Bug was produced by Max Fleischer and directed by Dave Fleischer, with animation sequences directed by Willard Bowsky, Myron Waldman, Thomas Johnson, David Tendlar, James Culhane, H.C. Ellison, Stan Quackenbush, and Graham Place. It was first previewed on December 4, 1941, in New York, three days before the Japanese attack on Pearl Harbor and the United States' subsequent entry into World War II. Paramount eventually released the film in the United Kingdom on January 23, 1942; in California on February 12; and in New York City on February 19. The film became a financial failure due to its botched release, minimal advertising, and short theatrical window. Fleischer Studios, which hoped to recoup the costs spent on Mr. Bug and Gulliver's Travels, was instead reorganized as Famous Studios in May 1942.

It was Paramount's last animated feature film until Charlotte's Web (made by Hanna-Barbera Productions in 1973).

== Plot ==
Hoppity the Grasshopper, after a period spent away, returns to an American city (Manhattan, New York City). He finds that all is not as he left it, and his insect friends, who live in the "Lowlands" just outside the garden of a cute bungalow belonging to down-on-his-luck songwriter Dick Dickens and his wife Mary, are now under threat from the "human ones", who are trampling through the broken-down fence, using it as a shortcut.

Insect houses are being flattened and burned by cast away cigar butts. Old Mr. Bumble and his beautiful daughter Honey (Hoppity's sweetheart) are in grave danger of losing their Honey Shop to this threat. To compound their problems, devious insect "property magnate" C. Bagley Beetle has romantic designs on Honey Bee himself, and, with the help of his henchmen Swat the Fly and Smack the Mosquito, hatches plans to make Honey marry him or eliminate Hoppity as a romantic rival.

Hoppity discovers that the songwriter and his wife are waiting for a "check thing" from the Famous Music publishing company for the songwriter's composition, "We're the Couple in the Castle". With this money they can repair the fence, saving the bug community, but C. Bagley Beetle and his henchmen intercept and hide the check, and the Dickens house is foreclosed. Days pass, and with nothing improved, nearly everyone in the lowlands loses faith in Hoppity's claim. Mr. Beetle discovers that a skyscraper will be built on the site, destroying both the Lowlands and his own property. He schemes to "gift" the other bugs his soon-to-be worthless property on the condition that Honey marry him. When he realizes that Hoppity was nearby and overheard him, he seals Hoppity inside the envelope with the Dickenses' check, hiding it in a crack in a wall.

Construction begins while everyone is at the wedding of Beetle and Honey; a weight from a surveyor's level that rips through the chapel causes the terrified bugs to flee back to the Lowlands, not realizing their own homes are endangered by the construction crew. Hoppity escapes when the construction crew demolishes the wall, freeing the envelope. Hoppity comes to Honey's rescue, battles Beetle and his henchmen, and wins.

Hoppity tells everyone what happened and manages to get the check to Mr. Dickens. "We're the Couple in the Castle" becomes a massive hit. Meanwhile, Hoppity leads an exodus from the Lowlands to the top of the skyscraper, where he believes the Dickenses have built a new home and invited the bugs to live there. They get to the top, which at first appears to be barren, but the young bugs discover the Dickenses have built a new penthouse with a "Garden of Paradise" just as Hoppity had described. Honey and the rest of the Lowlanders live there happily ever after in their new home. As Ambrose looks over the edge, he remarks, "Look at all the human ones down there. They look just like a lot of little bugs!"

== Production ==
Fleischer Studios' first feature, Gulliver's Travels, did such impressive business in its first week that Paramount president Barney Balaban ordered another feature for a Christmas 1941 release.

Mr. Bug Goes to Town is similar in concept to Gulliver's Travels with its large cast of characters, complicated crowd scenes, and the contrasting scale of tiny characters against the gigantic human world. In Mr. Bug, the environment is central to the picture. While the lead characters, Hoppity the grasshopper and Honey Bee, do not lead the story as clearly as Disney characters do, it is the situation that propels the plot combined with the colorful and comical supporting cast.

The film was beset by problems due to the rift between Max and Dave Fleischer that formed during the production of Gulliver's Travels. From that point on, they communicated with each other via internal memos while working in the same building; Max's son Richard Fleischer remarked in 2005 that running a major animated cartoon studio solely by written communique turned out to be "a sort of tragicomedy". Paramount was acutely aware of these problems and structured their contract for the completion of Mr. Bug in an unusual way, allowing the resignation of either Fleischer brother following its completion. When Paramount renewed the contract on May 24, 1941, a clause stipulated that the brothers deliver signed letters of resignation to Paramount to be used at the studio's discretion. Post-production concluded in Hollywood just before Thanksgiving, and Dave tendered his resignation one month before the scheduled release.

Mr. Bug Goes to Town was the first animated feature to give screen credit to the voice actors. In the starring roles of Hoppity and Honey were Stan Freed and Pauline Loth, respectively, while supporting characters were voiced by studio staff members such as Jack Mercer (Mr. Bumble, Swat the Fly, Insects), Tedd Pierce (C. Bagley Beetle, Insects), Carl Meyer (Smack the Mosquito), Pinto Colvig (Mr. Creeper, Insects), Gwen Davis and Jean Rhys (Insects), Mae Questel (Buzz the Beescout, Insects), and Margie Hines (Mrs. Ladybug). Singer Kenny Gardner and actress Gwen Williams portrayed "The Human Ones", Songwriter Dick Dickens and his wife, Mary.

=== Songs ===
Songs featured in Mr. Bug included "We're the Couple in the Castle", "Katy Did, Katy Didn't", "I'll Dance at Your Wedding (Honey Dear)" by Hoagy Carmichael and Frank Loesser, and "Boy Oh Boy" by Sammy Timberg and Loesser.

== Book and other merchandise ==
The film received a book adaptation which was released around the same time - it features new characters along with the ones from the film and goes further on key plots. For example, in the film Honey is aware of Beetle's romantic interest, expressing dislike to him but willing to make the sacrifice if it means everyone can live safely on his property away from the broken fence. In the book, Hoppity is made aware of this fact by Ambrose the Bee Scout, making Beetle's conflict with Hoppity more apparent from the start. Whether this was part of the film's script is unknown. The film also inspired a Mr. Bug Goes to Town board game and a series of trading cards.

== Release and legacy ==
Mr. Bug Goes to Town was previewed on December 4, 1941 as an invitation-only press preview, in advance of its scheduled Christmas release. While it was well received by critics, theater operators rejected it. The preview came three days before the Japanese attack on Pearl Harbor, which signaled America's entrance into World War II. Three weeks later, Barney Balaban initiated Max Fleischer's resignation. The Christmas release was later dropped, with another screening occurring in New York on December 30 for "the children of movie press folks." Paramount would finally release the film to the public in the United Kingdom on January 23, 1942, under the name Hoppity Goes to Town. A California release, double billed with Sullivan's Travels, followed on February 12, 1942, and on February 19 in New York City as a main attraction. The latter two releases were screened for only a week before being pulled from theaters.

Steven Losie argued that Mr. Bug's performance at the box office was likely not hampered by the attack on Pearl Harbor, but more so by Paramount mishandling the film's release. Paramount never officially acknowledge the reasons for the delay, but nevertheless resulted in the film becoming a financial failure. Paramount reorganized Fleischer Studios as Famous Studios not long after. Before the film's release, Walter Lantz, Paul Terry, and Leon Schlesinger all considered producing animated feature films, but after seeing this film's disappointing performance and the initial failures of Walt Disney's Pinocchio and Fantasia (both 1940), they cancelled any potential animated feature projects.

Harlan Ellison described vivid memories of having to outwit his family in order to see Mr. Bug Goes to Town for free on his birthday in his book Harlan Ellison's Watching. He credits his exploit as having fostered his rebellious nature rather than remaining a sweet obedient child. He never got to see the entire film until it came out on videocassette, and he watched it frequently throughout his adult life.

Paramount later re-released Mr. Bug as Hoppity Goes to Town. The film cost $713,511 to make, but by 1946 had only made $241,000 back, and was withdrawn from circulation. Under the reissue title, Hoppity has had multiple re-releases on home video throughout the 1970s (most with inferior image quality) to its DVD release by Legend Films, in which the studio re-titled the film again to Bugville (presumably to position against Pixar's A Bug's Life).

The film was acquired in October 1956 by National Telefilm Associates (which became Republic) as part of several features which NTA purchased from Leo McCarey after he acquired the film from Paramount earlier. The film enjoyed a renewed popularity as a staple on local "movie classics" shows such as Family Classics on Chicago's WGN. The film (as Hoppity Goes to Town) was officially released by Republic Pictures on VHS and LaserDisc in May 1989. In 1999, Paramount Pictures' parent company, Viacom, purchased Republic, which subsequently became a subsidiary of Paramount Pictures. As such, Mr. Bug Goes to Town is one of the few 1929–49 Paramount sound features to remain under Paramount's ownership; most of the 1929–49 sound library is currently owned by NBCUniversal through EMKA, Ltd.

In Japan, the film was released on December 19, 2009, as part of Studio Ghibli's Ghibli Museum Library. A DVD was released in April 2010 by Walt Disney Studios Home Entertainment in Japan, and it has been reported to be a restoration using NTA re-release elements. Recently, Mr. Bug, along with many other Fleischer-produced cartoons (including the Fleischers' previous film, Gulliver's Travels), was restored from the original three-strip negatives by the UCLA Film and Television Archive, and a few art-house theaters have recently screened the restoration (which features the original titles).

The film debuted on the Turner Classic Movies channel on October 21, 2012, transferred from an original 35mm Technicolor release print owned by the Museum of Modern Art Department of Film, for the first time on television in a special hosted by Robert Osborne and Jerry Beck dedicated to rare animated films, including Gulliver's Travels, Lotte Reiniger's The Adventures of Prince Achmed, the UPA cartoons, and the silent cartoons of 1907 to 1932 of the New York studios. The film appeared again on the channel in June 2015.

In 2023, Kino Lorber announced they would release the film on Blu-ray under license from Paramount Pictures, who did a 4K restoration of the feature, which was slated for early 2024 but was delayed and eventually cancelled. Kino Lorber spokesperson Frank Tarzi stated that the Blu-Ray release of Mr. Bug was cancelled due to the transfer Paramount made containing massive amounts of Digital Noise Reduction, and not meeting Kino Lorber's standards. Paramount would later release the film for digital download following this.

== See also ==
- List of American films of 1941
