= Ted Sears =

American animator (1900–1958)

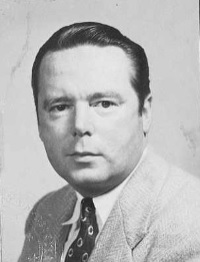
- Sears in his passport photograph (c. 1941)
- Born: Edward Robert Sears Jr. March 13, 1900; Greenfield, Massachusetts
- Died: August 22, 1958 (aged 58); Los Angeles, California
- Occupation: Animator

Edward Robert Sears (March 13, 1900 – August 22, 1958) was an American animator during the Golden Age of American animation. Sears worked for the Fleischer Studios in the late-1920s and early-1930s, and was hired away from Max Fleischer to work at Walt Disney Productions in 1931.

As the first head of Disney's story department, Sears did significant story work on many Disney features, including Snow White and the Seven Dwarfs, Pinocchio, Fantasia, Dumbo, Bambi, The Adventures of Ichabod and Mr. Toad (The Wind in the Willows segment), Cinderella, Alice in Wonderland, Peter Pan (for which he wrote song lyrics), Lady and the Tramp, and Sleeping Beauty (for which he wrote song lyrics). Sears had initially provided the voice of the titular character in Pinocchio before the character was reimagined and child actor Dickie Jones was cast as the voice of the character instead.

Sears was born in Greenfield, Massachusetts, enumerated with mother and maternal grandparents on June 5, 1900, son of Edward R Sears Sr and Margaret Ellen Burke, but was raised in New York City. He married Violet Mitchell on 16 Aug 1937 He died in Los Angeles, California, at the age of 58 in 1958.
