= Walter Van Brunt =

American singer

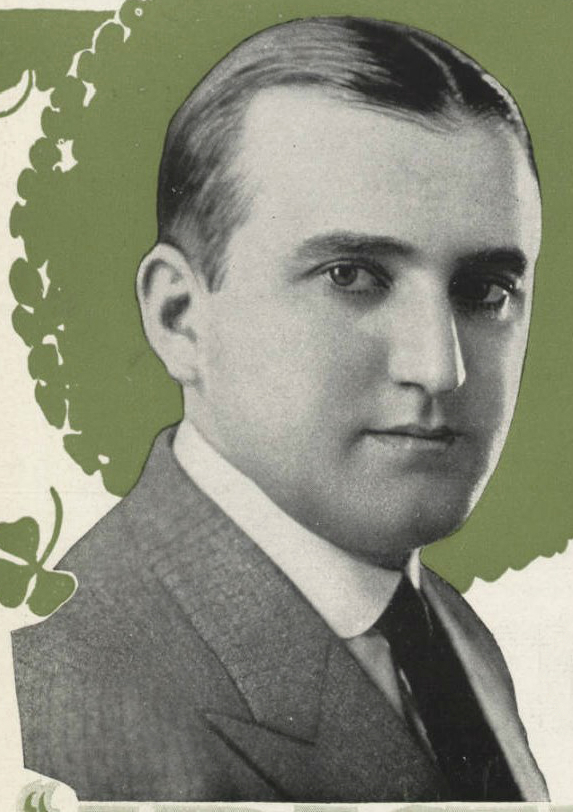
- Van Brunt in 1921

Background information
- Born: April 22, 1892; New York City, U.S.
- Died: April 11, 1971 (aged 78) Dover, Ohio, U.S.
- Genre: Pop
- Occupation: Singer
- Years active: 1908–1933
- Label: Blue Amberol

Walter Van Brunt, also known by the pseudonym Walter Scanlan, (April 22, 1892 – April 11, 1971) was an American tenor known initially for his recordings on Thomas Alva Edison's Blue Amberol Records and later for his role in a scandal involving a stage name and case of adultery.

== Biography ==
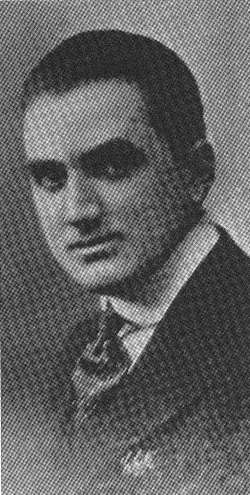
Van Brunt, 1916

=== Career ===
Van Brunt began his singing career at the age of 16, as an imitator of singer Billy Murray. Van Brunt was soon performing with Ada Jones and John Bieling, as well as the American Quartet. Van Brunt worked in vaudeville and on Broadway, including in the musical Eileen. He had a number of bestselling records, including his 1914 duet with Elizabeth Spencer.

Walter Van Brunt - "Rose of Italy" (1915)

From 1929 to 1933, Murray used Van Brunt on various radio programs. In 1929, Scanlon and Billy Murray provided the voices for the Fleischer short animation film Finding His Voice, produced by Western Electric.

=== Scandal ===
In 1917, Van Brunt began using the name Walter J. Scanlan (newspapers sometimes erroneously rendered the name as "Scanlon"), which was the name of a late 19th-century Irish tenor who had had an established career before dying, but never made any recordings. It has been suggested, but not proven, that the Irish-American composer of Eileen, Victor Herbert, had encouraged the use of this stage name when he cast Van Brunt as the leading man. It was not a secret that this was a stage name: The New York Times review of Eileen stated that Scanlan's real name was Van Brunt. Van Brunt later had a bigamous affair with a woman known as Ruth Scanlan, siring a child with her and prompting his wife Lillian to sue for divorce, which was granted in 1925 by an Irish-American judge who, in announcing his decision that Van Brunt should pay alimony, criticized Van Brunt's character.

=== Death ===
Van Brunt died on April 11, 1971, in Dover, Ohio, where he had resided then.
