= Bernard Wolf =

American animator and television producer (1911–2006)

- Born: July 18, 1911; New York City, New York, U.S.
- Died: September 7, 2006 (aged 95); Los Angeles, California, U.S.
- Occupation: Animator

Bernard "Berny" Wolf (July 18, 1911 - September 7, 2006) was an American animator and television producer.

== Biography ==
Wolf was born in New York City. His career in animation started either in 1924, or 1927. He began work as an inker on Charles Mintz' Krazy Kat silent shorts as an Inker along with Dave Tendlar. The shorts were being distributed by Paramount Pictures at the time. He moved to Inkwell Studios shortly afterwards a predecessor to Fleischer Studios, where he was hired by Max Fleischer as an Inbetweener on Koko the Clown in the silent The Inkwell Imps series. In 1931 he was promoted to the position of Animator and worked with Seymour Kneitel on the Betty Boop cartoons. While much credit has been given to Grim Natwick for her creation, her transformation into the cute cartoon girl was due to the work of Berny Wolf, Seymour Kneitel, Roland Crandall, and Willard Bowsky, who continued working with her after Natwick left in early February 1931 to direct for Ub Iwerks on the West coast. It was at Fleischer Studios that he met Shamus Culhane and Al Eugster, with whom he would maintain a long personal and professional relationship. The three would leave Fleischer to work briefly for Ub Iwerks, where they worked alongside Grim Natwick.

In 1938, Wolf, Eugster and Culhane moved to Walt Disney Studios. After working briefly in the shorts department, Wolf moved on to features. He was one of the animators of Pinocchio and Fantasia (The Pastoral Symphony Segment). His final work at Disney was on Dumbo.

Wolf left Disney after the 1941 strike. He briefly provided uncredited work for Tex Avery at MGM's cartoon department before being drafted during World War II. Wolf was assigned to the First Motion Picture Unit, a group of former Hollywood personnel who created short educational films for the American military. After the war, Wolf worked briefly for animator Rudolf Ising and worked on commercials for companies like FilmFair before forming his own company, Animedia Inc. Animedia produced animation for advertising and commercial films. The company also designed some of the costumes used at Walt Disney World, as well as animating segments for Sesame Street.

Wolf folded Animedia in the 1970s in order to return to animation full-time. He produced several animated features for Hanna-Barbera, including 1987's The Jetsons Meet the Flintstones. He was Producer of Bobby's World for Film Roman, and was an uncredited Animator on Tom and Jerry: The Movie. He retired from animation in the 1990s, but continued to provide freelance animation pre-production for Fred Wolf Films, commercial design, and additionally developed mascots for the MGM Grand Hotel in Las Vegas. Wolf died in 2006 at the age of 95.

== Filmography ==
Year	Title	Credits	Characters	Notes
1940	Pinocchio	Animator		Credited and known as Berny Wolf
1940	Fantasia	Animator - Segment "The Pastoral Symphony"		Credited and known as Berny Wolf
1941	Dumbo	Animator		Credited and known as Berny Wolf
1980	Mickey Mouse Disco (Short)	Animator		Credited and known as Bernie Wolf
1985	Galtar and the Golden Lance (TV Series)	Producer		
1985–1986	Paw Paws (TV Series)	Producer – 21 Episodes		
1986	Pound Puppies (TV Series)	Associate Producer – 13 Episodes		
1986	Foofur (TV Series)	Associate Producer – 13 Episodes		
1986–1987	The New Adventures of Jonny Quest (TV Series)	Producer – 13 Episodes		
1986–1987	The Flintstone Kids (TV Series)	Associate Producer – 26 Episodes		
1987	The Jetsons (TV Series)	Producer – 10 Episodes		
1987	The Jetsons Meet the Flintstones (TV Movie)	Producer		
1987	Yogi Bear and the Magical Flight of the Spruce Goose (TV Movie)	Producer		
1987	The Little Troll Prince (TV Movie)	Producer / Story Editor		
1985–1987	Snorks (TV Series)	Producer – 23 Episodes		
1988	Top Cat and the Beverly Hills Cats (TV Movie)	Producer		
1988	Scooby-Doo and the Ghoul School (TV Movie)	Producer		
1988	Scooby-Doo! and the Reluctant Werewolf	Producer		
1988	Yogi and the Invasion of the Space Bears (TV Movie)	Producer		
1989	The Smurfs (TV Series)	Animation Director – 24 Episodes		
1989–1990	Paddington Bear (TV Series)	Animation Director – 13 Episodes		
1990	Garfield's Feline Fantasies (TV Short)	Key Animator		
1990	Jetsons: The Movie	Animator		Credited and known as Berny Wolf
1989–1990	A Pup Named Scooby-Doo (TV Series)	Animation Director – 11 Episodes		
1990–1991	Garfield and Friends (TV Series)	Director – 13 Episodes		
1990–1994	Bobby's World (TV Series Short)	Director – 17 Episodes		
1994	Garfield and Friends	Animator – 1 Episode		
1994	Sonic the Hedgehog (TV Series Short)	Animation Timer – 13 Episodes		
1996	The Fantastic Voyages of Sinbad the Sailor (TV Series)	Sheet Timer – 1 Episode		
