= Little Ann Little =

American actress

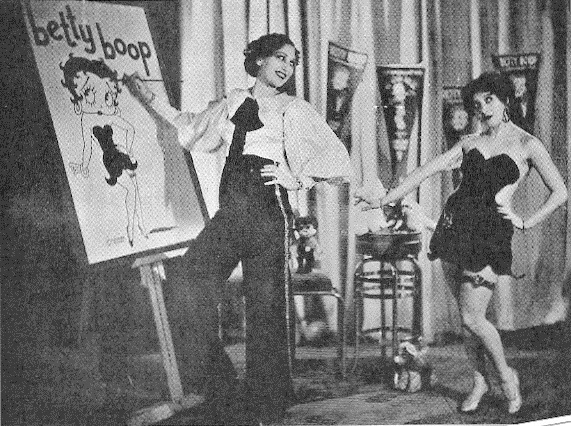
- Pauline Comanor (left) and Ann Little
- Born: March 1, 1902
- Died: October 22, 1981 (aged 79); Fort Myers, Florida, US
- Other names: Annie Rothschild, Annabel Little, Ann Little Werner
- Occupations: Actress, voice artist, singer
- Years active: 1920s-1946
- Spouses: Louis Werner (died 1948); Joseph Rothschild (m. 1960; died 1969)

Ann L. Rothschild (born March 1, 1902 – October 22, 1981) credits variously as Little Ann Little, Annabel Little and Ann Little Werner, was an American vaudevillian, voice actress and singer who gained fame in the 1930s as the voice of Betty Boop, taking over the voice from original portrayer Margie Hines. From March to the final of 1933, Little Ann Little made recordings for the "Betty Boop" cartoons and tour and appeared in variety shows throughout the country.

== Career ==
Little got the job as the voice of Betty Boop as the result of a contest held by Paramount Pictures for a girl with a squeaky voice. She was also well suited for the role physically, being only 4 ft 10 in (1.47 m) and weighing 100 pounds (45 kg).

Little went on the road with the Fleischer Studios artist Pauline Comanor. Ann would pose while Pauline drew her as Betty Boop. They both finished the act with a "boop-boop-a-doop."

Little had started in show business in 1925 as a member of the pony chorus with the Greenwich Village Follies. She was also an RKO discovery and at one time had her own program on the NBC network as singer Little Ann Little.

== Personal life ==
After her show business career was finished, Little moved to St. Petersburg, Florida with her husband, who was a retired employee of Consolidated Edison. In the late 1940s, she was an instructor at the Pauline Buhner School of Dance there, where she taught acting, singing and dancing.

Her most famous pupil was Carroll Baker, who she taught for three years. She closed her class in 1951.

Little studied the Bible, with the goal of becoming an ordained minister and to preach the Gospel. From 1954, Little was ordained as minister in the Unity Church of Christianity.

Little died at the age of 79 in Fort Myers, Florida on October 22, 1981.

== Filmography ==
Title	Year
Betty Boop's Birthday (short) (Betty Boop, voice uncredited)	1933
Betty Boop's May Party (short) (Betty Boop, voice uncredited)	1933
Betty Boop's Big Boss (short) (Betty Boop, voice uncredited)	1933
