= Willard Bowsky =

American cartoonist and United States Army officer (1907–44)

- Born: Willard Gustav Bowsky; September 26, 1907; Montclair, New Jersey
- Died: November 27, 1944 (aged 37) near Barr, Bas-Rhin, France
- Burial place: Lorraine American Cemetery and Memorial
- Military career
- Allegiance: United States
- Branch: United States Army
- Service years: 1942–1944
- Rank: Second lieutenant
- Units: 94th Cavalry Reconnaissance Squadron, 14th Armored Division
- Awards: Purple Heart; Silver Star
- Other work: animator

Willard Gustav Bowsky (September 26, 1907 – November 27, 1944) was an American animator best known for his work at Fleischer Studios in New York City and Miami, Florida, where he worked on cartoons featuring Betty Boop, Popeye the Sailor, and Superman, in addition to two feature-length animated films. Fellow Fleischer animator Shamus Culhane described Bowsky as "what one might call a pre-McCarthy, gung ho, all-American Babbitt." He was described as being outspoken with antisemitic remarks, but skilled at animating complicated perspective shots and directing many of the jazz-influenced cartoons produced by the studio.

Bowsky was killed in World War II in eastern France, while serving combat duty in the United States Army. He was awarded posthumously the Silver Star and the Purple Heart.

== Biography ==
Bowsky was born in New Jersey in 1907 into an Italian-German-Jewish immigrant family, the second son of Herman Bowsky and Emma L. Bowsky (née Cimiotti), both born in New York City. Herman Bowsky's parents emigrated from Germany; while Emma's father was born in Austria of Italian descent and emigrated from there as a young adult. Willard's brother, Merle, was born December 25, 1904.

Bowsky grew up as a child in Manhattan and across the Hudson River in New Jersey. He attended local schools and began drawing when young. In the 1920s, while still living with his parents, he began his career in animation.

In the late 1920s, Bowsky began working at the Fleischer Studios. He was promoted to credited animator in 1930 in Screen Song "bouncing ball" cartoons and Talkartoons, starring the character Betty Boop. Bowsky had a particular appreciation of jazz as animator Shamus Culhane noted "He would even go into ecstasies over Cab Calloway records." As a result, Bowsky directed many of the jazz influenced Betty Boop cartoons such as Minnie the Moocher, I'll Be Glad When You're Dead You Rascal You, and I Heard. Bowsky began his long association with Popeye the Sailor with the 1933 cartoon Blow Me Down!. For these cartoons, Bowsky was head animator, and effectively served as animation director. Dave Fleischer, the credited director of all of the Fleischer work, served as creative producer and head storyman. When asked both Dave and Max Fleischer named Bowsky as the best animator working at the studio.

In 1938, Bowsky relocated to Florida with the Fleischer Studios. He went on to work on the Superman cartoons and the Fleischer Studios' two feature-length films, Gulliver's Travels and Mr. Bug Goes to Town.

Shortly after Fleischer Studios was reorganized as Famous Studios in 1942, Bowsky enlisted in the U.S. Army on October 14, 1942. While most animators serving during the war were assigned to animation studios serving the military, Bowsky did combat duty with the 14th Armored Division. He was a platoon leader with 50 men under his command in the 94th Cavalry Reconnaissance Squadron.

Bowsky was killed in action (KIA) on November 27, 1944, in a nighttime firefight with German forces near Metz, France. The German forces were overwhelmed but still inflicted loss on the Allied troops, utilizing four-barreled flak wagons originally designed as anti-aircraft artillery.

Bowsky's remains were buried at the Lorraine American Cemetery and Memorial in Saint-Avold, Moselle, France.
