= Fleischer Studios =

Defunct American animation studio

- Type: Private
- Industry: Motion pictures
- Predecessor: Bray Productions; Inkwell Studios
- Founded: 1929; 97 years ago
- Founder: Max Fleischer; Dave Fleischer
- Defunct: May 25, 1942; 84 years ago
- Fate: Renamed and reorganized as Famous Studios after its acquisition by Paramount Pictures and the resignation of its founders.
- Successors: Studio: Famous Studios (fully-owned subsidiary of Paramount Pictures, renamed to Paramount Cartoon Studios in 1956); Paramount Animation; Library: Skydance (through Republic Pictures, Turner Entertainment Co., and DC Entertainment)
- Headquarters: Broadway, New York City, New York, U.S. (1929–1938); Miami, Florida, U.S. (1938–1942)
- Products: Animated short subjects and feature films
- Owner: Paramount Pictures (1941–42)
- Number of employees: Approx. 800 (1939)

Fleischer Studios, Inc. (/ˈflaɪʃər/) was an American animation studio founded in 1929 by brothers Max and Dave Fleischer, who ran the pioneering company from its inception until its acquisition by Paramount Pictures in 1942, the parent company and the distributor of its films. In its prime, Fleischer Studios was a premier producer of animated cartoons for theaters, with Walt Disney Productions being its chief competitor in the 1930s.

Fleischer Studios included Out of the Inkwell and Talkartoons characters such as Koko the Clown, Betty Boop, Bimbo, Popeye the Sailor, Gabby and Superman. The cartoons of the New York City-based Fleischer Studios were very different from those of Disney, both in concept and in execution. As a result, they were rough rather than refined and consciously artistic rather than commercial, focusing on surrealism, dark humor, adult psychological elements, and sexuality. Furthermore, the environments were grittier and urban, often set in squalid surroundings, reflecting the Great Depression as well as German Expressionism.

After the implementation of the Hays Code and a labor strike causing the studio to move to Miami, the studio's output pivoted towards imitating Disney's style, resulting in a decline of its output quality and eventual reorganization into Famous Studios.

== History ==
=== Before Fleischer Studios ===
Max Fleischer and Dave Fleischer, employees at Bray Productions, gained prominence by creating the novelty film series Out of the Inkwell (1918–1927). The novelty was based largely on the results of the "rotoscope", invented by Fleischer to produce realistic animation. They featured Fleischer's first character, "The Clown", who later became known as Ko-Ko the Clown.

In 1921, Bray Productions ran afoul of legal issues, having contracted for more films than it could deliver to its distributor, Goldwyn Pictures. The Fleischer Brothers left and began their own studio, Out of the Inkwell Films, with Dave Fleischer as director and production supervisor, and Max as producer, at 129 East 45th Street, and later at 1600 Broadway, both in Manhattan. In 1922, animator Dick Huemer joined the studio and redesigned "The Clown" for more efficient animation. Huemer's new design and experience as an animator moved them away from their dependency on the rotoscope for fluid animation. In addition to defining the clown, who would be christened "Ko-Ko" in 1925, Huemer established the Fleischer style with its distinctive thick and thin ink lines. In addition, Huemer created Ko-Ko's companion, Fitz the Dog, who would evolve into Bimbo in 1930.

Throughout the 1920s, Fleischer was one of the leading producers of animation with clever moments and numerous innovations. These innovations include the "Rotograph", an early "Aerial Image" photographic process for compositing animation with live action backgrounds. Other innovations included Ko-Ko Song Car-Tunes and sing-along shorts (featuring the famous "bouncing ball"), a precursor to karaoke.

One of the cartoons in the Inklings series

In 1924, distributor Edwin Miles Fadiman and Hugo Riesenfeld formed the Red Seal Pictures Corporation. Riesenfeld was the theatrical manager of the Strand, Rivoli, and Rialto theaters on Broadway. Because the Out of the Inkwell films were a major part of the program in Riesenfeld's theaters, the Fleischers were invited to become partners. The Red Seal Company committed to an ambitious release schedule of 26 films with The Inkwell Studio as the primary supplier. The following year, Red Seal released 141 films that included documentaries, short comedy subjects, and live-action serials. Carrie of the Chorus, also known as Backstage Comedies, was one of the Red Seal series that featured Max's daughter, Ruth, in a supporting role. Ray Bolger made his screen debut in this series and dated Ruth for a short time.

Red Seal released cartoon novelty series such as The Animated Hair cartoons by cartoonist "Marcus", and Inklings. The Animated Hair series resembled the on-screen hand drawing gimmick established in Out of the Inkwell. In this case, "Marcus" produced high-quality ink line portraits of celebrities and political figures. Then through stop motion animation techniques, the lines and forms would break away to entertainingly re-form the portrait into another. Inklings was similar in concept to the Animated Hair films, but was more of a visual puzzle novelty using a variety of progressive scratch-off/reveal techniques and rearranged animated cutouts to change the images.

It was during this time that Lee de Forest started filming his Phonofilms experiments featuring several of the major Broadway headliners. The Red Seal company began acquiring more theaters outside of New York and equipped them with sound equipment produced by Lee de Forest, displaying "talkies" three years before the sound revolution began. Because of Max's interest in technology, Riesenfeld introduced him to de Forest. It was through this partnership that Max produced a number of the Ko-Ko Song Car-tunes as sound releases. Of the 36 song films produced between 1924 and 1927, 12 were produced as sound films beginning in 1926 with standard silent versions as well. The first sound release was Mother Pin a Rose on Me. Other sound releases included Darling Nellie Gray, Has Anybody Here Seen Kelly?, When the Midnight Choo-Choo Leaves for Alabam', Coming Through the Rye, My Wife's Gone to the Country, Margie, Oh, How I Hate to Get Up in the Morning, Sweet Adeline, Old Black Joe, Come Take A Trip in My Airship, and By the Light of the Silvery Moon.

Red Seal owned 56 theaters, extending as far west as Cleveland, Ohio. But after only two years of operation, Red Seal was broke. Max Fleischer sought an appointment of receiver in bankruptcy in October 1926. Just as the situation looked hopeless, Alfred Weiss offered a Paramount contact.

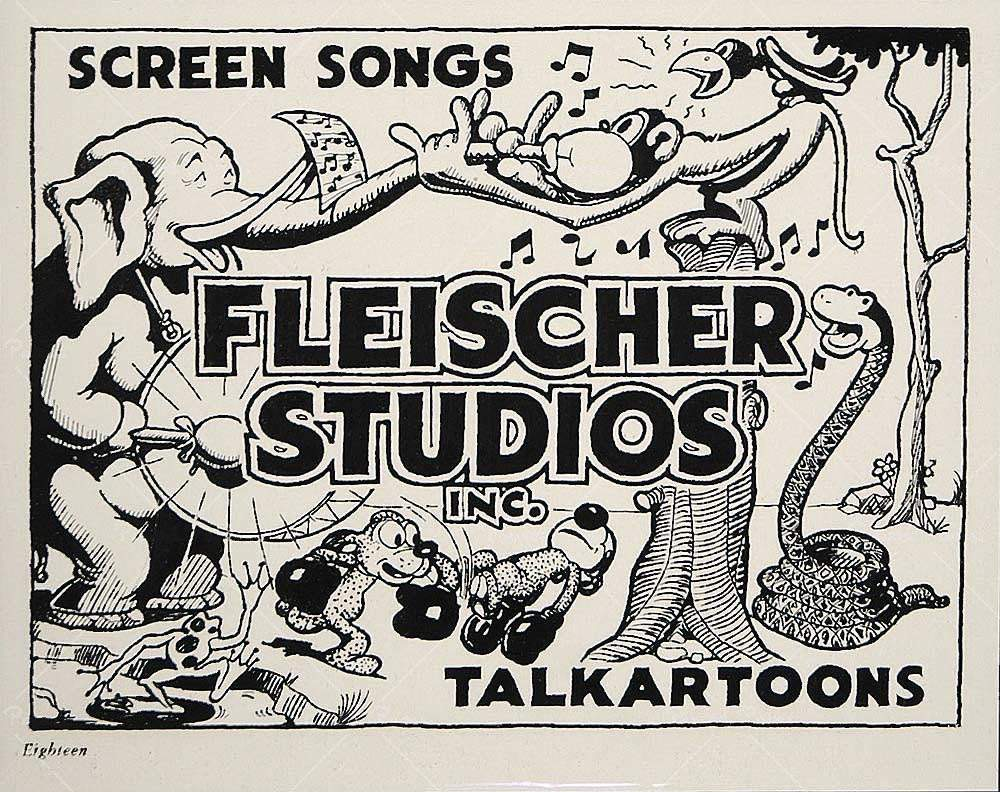
A Talkartoons print ad. Fleischer Studios had no logo despite one being used here.

=== Founding and sound films ===
The Paramount deal provided financing and distribution, but due to legal complications of the bankruptcy, the title to Out of the Inkwell was changed to The Inkwell Imps (1927–1929) and the studio was renamed Inkwell Studios. One year into the relationship, the Fleischers discovered mismanagement under Weiss and left before the end of the Imps contract in late 1928. Out of the Inkwell Films, Inc. filed bankruptcy in January 1929. In March, Max formed Fleischer Studios with Dave as his partner. Operations were first set up at the Carpenter-Goldman Laboratories in Queens. With a skeleton staff and with his characters owned by Weiss, Fleischer Studios started out doing industrial films, most notably, Finding His Voice, a technical demonstration film explaining Western Electric's Variable Density recording and reproduction system. Max Fleischer secured a new contract with Paramount to produce a revival of the "Bouncing Ball" song films, re-branded as Screen Songs, with The Sidewalks of New York as the first release on February 5, 1929.

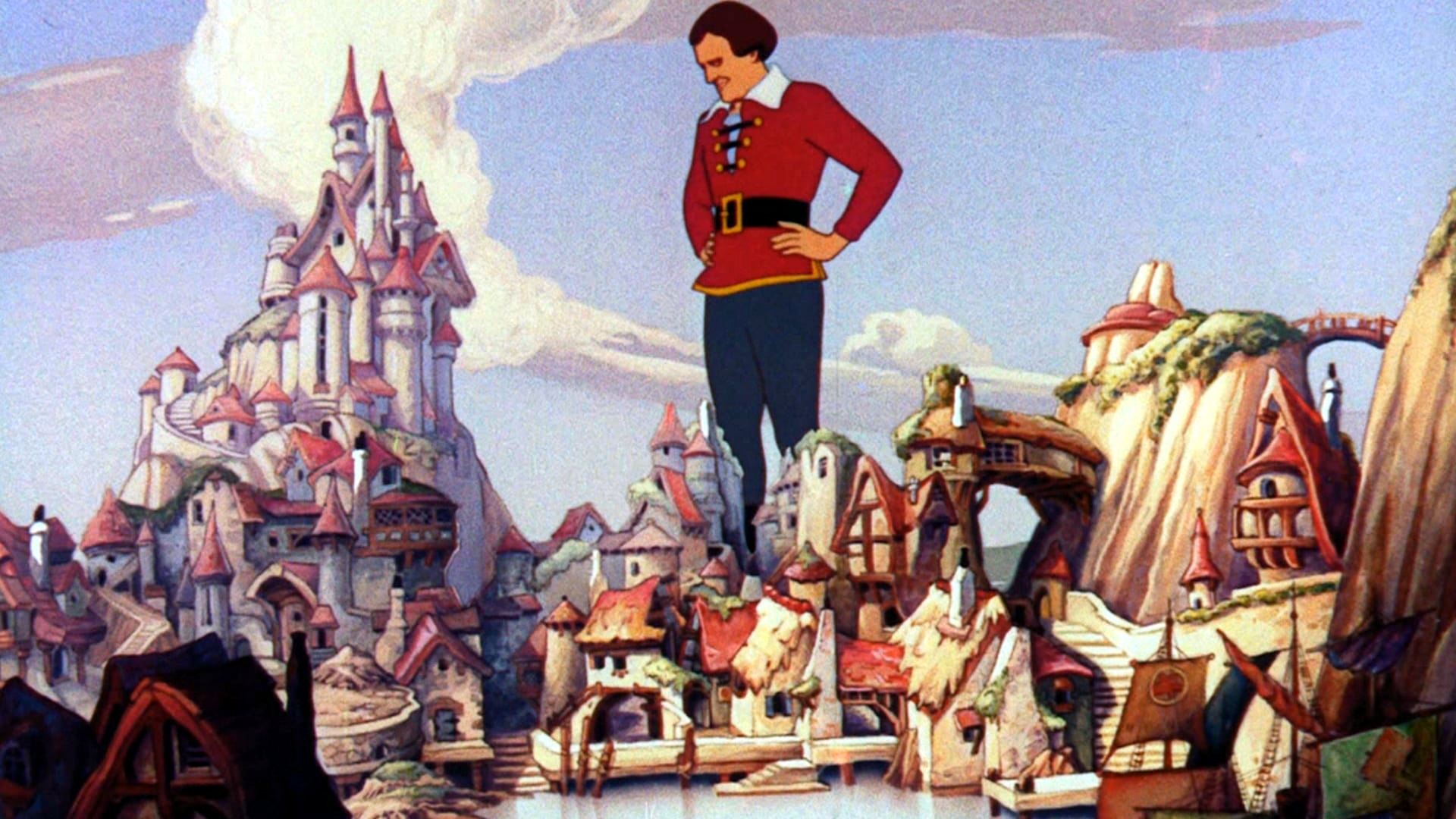
Gulliver's Travels (1939) was Fleischer Studios' first feature-length animated production.

The early experiments with sound synchronization gave Fleischer Studios experience in perfecting the post-production method of recording, aided by several inventions by founder, Max Fleischer. With the conversion to sound, Paramount needed more sound films, and cartoons could be produced faster than feature films. As the Screen Songs returned Fleischer to the established song film format, a new sound series, Talkartoons replaced the silent Inkwell Imps, the first being Noah's Lark released on October 25, 1929. Earlier entries in the series were one-shot cartoons, until the appearance of Bimbo as of the fourth entry. Bimbo evolved through several redesigns in each cartoon for the first year. While the intent was to develop him as the star of the series, it was the cameo appearance of a Helen Kane caricature in the seventh entry, Dizzy Dishes that took center stage. Audience reactions to the New York preview were so great that Paramount encouraged the continued development of the most famous character to come from the Fleischer Studio by that time, Betty Boop. While originated as a hybrid human/canine character, Betty Boop was transformed into the human character she is known as by 1932. Having become the main attraction of the Talkartoons, she was given her own series, which ran until 1939.

The "Jazz Baby" Flapper character, Betty Boop lifted the spirits of Depression-era audiences with her paradoxical mixture of childlike innocence and sexual allure. Being a musical novelty character, she was a natural for theatrical entertainment. Several of her early cartoons were developed as promotional vehicles for some of the top Black Jazz performers of the day including Louis Armstrong (I'll Be Glad When You're Dead You Rascal, You), Don Redman (I Heard), and most notably, the three cartoons made with Cab Calloway, Minnie the Moocher, Snow-White, and The Old Man of the Mountain. This was considered a bold action in light of the Jim Crow policies active in the South where such films would not be shown.

In 1934, the Hays Code resulted in severe censorship for films. This affected the content of all of Paramount's films as well, which tended to reflect a more "mature" tone in the features of the Marx Brothers, W.C. Fields, and most of all, Mae West. As a result, each of these stars was released as Paramount changed the content of its films to reflect a more "general audience" in order to comply with the new Code and stay in business. Paramount had also gone through three reorganizations from bankruptcy between 1931 and 1936. The new management under Barney Balaban set out to make more general audience films of the type made at MGM, but for lower budgets. This change in content policy affected the content of cartoons that Fleischer was to produce for Paramount, which urged emulation of the Walt Disney product.

While Paramount was a large organization with a network of theaters, its fiscal consciousness was largely responsible for preventing Fleischer Studios from acquiring the three-strip Technicolor process, leaving it available for a four-year exclusivity with Walt Disney, who created a new market for color cartoons, established by Academy Award winner, Flowers and Trees (1932).

Paramount acquiesced to the release of the Color Classics series starting in 1934, but with the exclusivity of the three-color process still held by Disney, Fleischer Studios used the available two-color processes, Cinecolor, a two-emulsion red and blue process, and Two-color Technicolor, using red and green. By 1936, the Disney exclusivity had expired, and Fleischer Studios used the three-color process in its color cartoons beginning with Somewhere in Dreamland and continued using it for the remainder of its active years.

The Fleischer Studios' greatest success came with the licensing of E. C. Segar's comic strip character Popeye the Sailor beginning in 1933. Popeye eventually became the most popular series the studio ever produced, and its success surpassed Walt Disney's Mickey Mouse cartoons, documented by popularity polls. With the availability of full spectrum color, the Fleischer Studios produced three two-reel Popeye featurettes, Popeye the Sailor Meets Sindbad the Sailor (1936), Popeye the Sailor Meets Ali Baba's Forty Thieves (1937), and Aladdin and His Wonderful Lamp (1939). This series of longer-format cartoons were an indication of the emergence of the animated feature film as a commercially viable project beginning with Walt Disney's Snow White and the Seven Dwarfs (1937).

The Fleischer Studios had reached its zenith by 1936, with four series and 52 annual releases. Due to the phenomenal success of the Popeye cartoons, Paramount demanded more, and the Fleischer Studio experienced rapid expansion in order to balance out the increased workload. The crowded conditions, production speedups, drawing quotas, and internal management problems resulted in a labor strike beginning in May 1937 which lasted for five months. This strike was a test case, the first launched in the motion picture industry, and produced a nationwide boycott of Fleischer cartoons for the duration.

Max Fleischer had been petitioning Paramount for three years about producing an animated feature. Paramount vetoed his proposals until the proven success of Disney's Snow White and the Seven Dwarfs (1937). Paramount now wanted an animated feature for a 1939 Christmas release. This request came at the time of preparations for relocating to Miami, Florida. While the relocation had been a consideration for some time, its final motivation was made a reality due to lower corporate tax structures and an alleged escape from the remaining hostility from the strike.

The new Fleischer Studio opened in October 1938, and production on its first feature, Gulliver's Travels (1939), went from the development stage begun in New York to active production in Miami. The score was by Paramount staff composer, Victor Young and recorded at the Paramount west coast facilities. While limited to only 60 theaters in a one-month release, Gulliver's Travels earned more than $3 million in the United States alone, exceeding its original $500,000 estimated cost. Accordingly, a second feature was ordered for the Christmas period, Mr. Bug Goes to Town (1941).

=== Fall of Fleischer ===
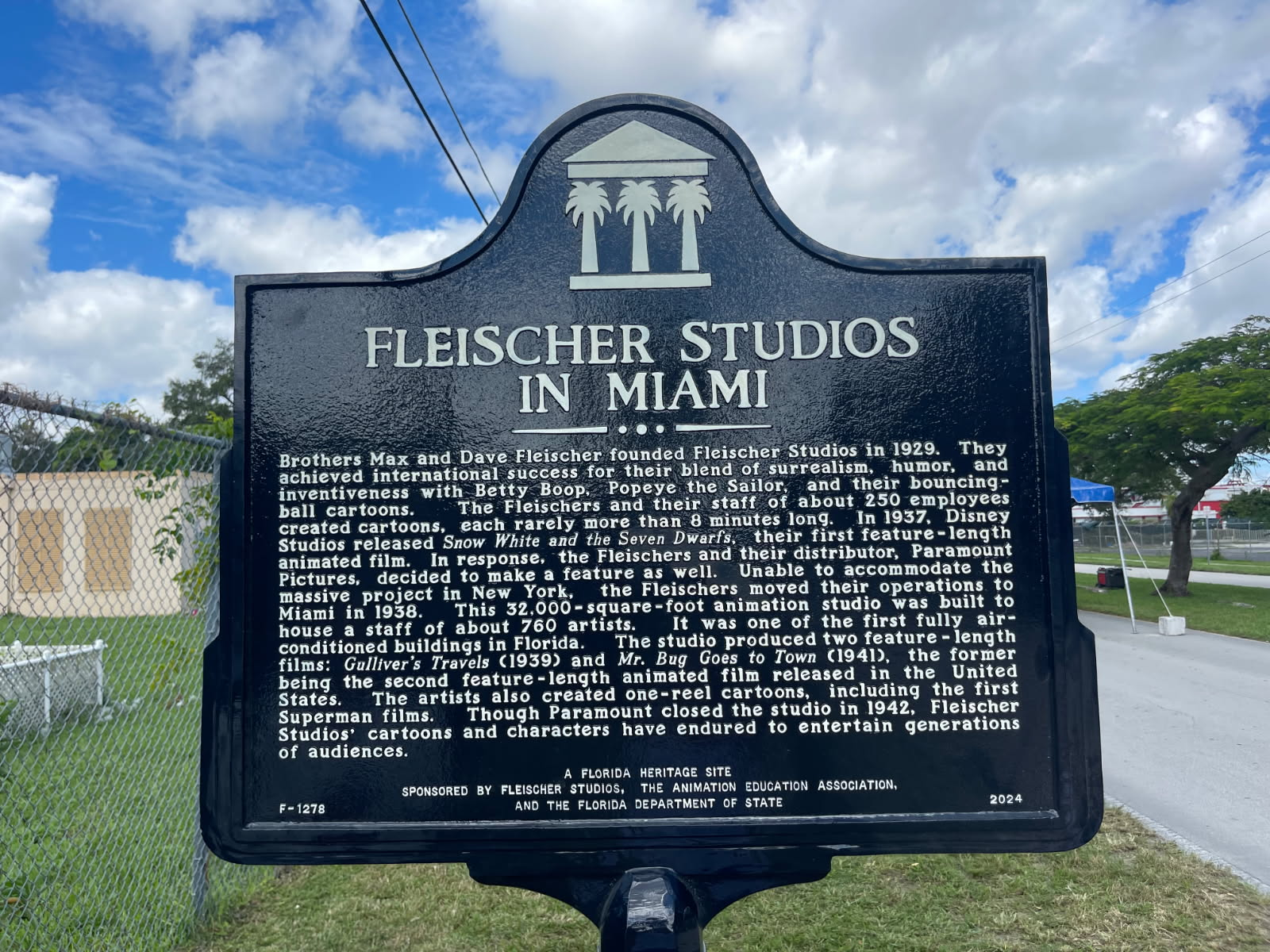
Florida Historical Marker noting the site of the Fleischer Studio in Miami

The personal relationship between Max and Dave Fleischer deteriorated during the Miami period due to complications associated with the pressures of finishing the studio's first feature film and Dave's very public adulterous affair with his secretary, Mae Schwartz. Max and Dave stopped speaking to each other altogether by the end of 1939, communicating solely by memo.

Dave gained total control of production in 1940, relegating Max to business affairs and research. The studio was in need of new products going into the new decade, but the new shorts series that debuted in 1939 and 1940, Gabby, Stone Age Cartoons, and Animated Antics, were unsuccessful. Theater operators complained, with the Popeye cartoons having the only value.

Paramount acquired the rights to comic book superhero Superman in 1941, and the Fleischers were assigned to work on a series of animated Superman shorts. The first entry, Superman, had a budget of $50,000, the highest ever for a Fleischer theatrical short, and was nominated for an Academy Award.

The animated Superman series, with its action-adventure and science-fiction fantasy content, was a huge success, but that did not help the studio out of its financial trouble. It was penalized $350,000 for going over budget on Gulliver's Travels, and the revenues earned from the rentals of the Popeye cartoons had to be used to offset the loss of $250,000 incurred by the rejection of cartoons in 1940.

=== Paramount Takeover and the end of Fleischer Studios ===
On May 19, 1941, Fleischer Studios renewed its contract with Paramount for the 1941-42-film season. Paramount would issue a total of $852,000 as weekly advances to Fleischer Studios for the production of their films. This included the completion of the feature film Mr. Bug Goes to Town as well as for the production of 12 Superman cartoons (which was later reduced to 9), 12 Popeye cartoons, and the two-reel special The Raven.

However, on May 24 – just five days later – Paramount short subject executive, Dick Murray (who played liaison between Paramount and the Fleischers) came into Max Fleischer's office and demanded he sign a unilaterally amended version of their contract. The new contract called for Paramount's weekly advances to Fleischer Studios to be halted immediately unless their entire studio and all of its assets – including copyrights, patents and trademarks – be turned over to Paramount. Without Paramount's weekly advances, Fleischer Studios would essentially be forced into bankruptcy. Max immediately phoned his lawyer in New York, N. William Welling, who (to Max's surprise) seemed to have prior knowledge of this event, and advised him to sign, assuring him: "We can take care of that matter later on and have the ownership [of the studio] returned to you." Not wanting to put his 760 employees out of work, nor wanting to have the shame of a bankruptcy attached to his name, Max reluctantly signed the contract. Since the contract also required Dave's signature, Max sent the contract to him with a memo telling him to sign. The contract returned to Max in just under five minutes with Dave's signature - who had signed without reading.

Fleischer Studios was now a wholly owned subsidiary of Paramount Pictures, with Max and Dave now employees on a 26-week renewable contract at weekly salaries of $750 each. Paramount retained the rights to the name "Fleischer Studios" for until May 1942 (one full year), thus preventing Max or Dave starting another studio during that time. The new contract also had the Fleischer's sign resignation letters to Paramount in case of their dismissal.

Max Fleischer still had faith that Paramount would keep him on, but tensions between him and his brother continued to escalate. In the fall of 1941, Dave and Lou Fleischer were at the Paramount studio in Los Angeles supervising post-production on Mr. Bug Goes to Town. Once the recording of the film's score was complete on November 3, Lou took a three-day train trip back to Miami. Upon returning to the studio on the morning of November 7, Lou had learned Max had just given his secretary a memo to wire to Paramount saying "I can no longer work with Dave Fleischer", which he had been patiently waiting until Mr. Bug was complete before sending. Lou and Joe Fleischer explained to Max that this was premature, since, while the score was finished, the film still had two-weeks left of post-production. When Max realised his mistake, it was too late, the telegram had already been sent to Paramount. Lou worried that this could result in Max's termination, but Max wasn't concerned. Mr. Bug Goes to Town was officially completed on November 21, 1941. The next day, Dave officially resigned on November 22, just two days before the 26-week contract expired. He remained in Los Angeles and accepted a position at Columbia Pictures' Screen Gems studio.

Mr. Bug Goes to Town was previewed to critics in New York City on December 4, 1941, with the film scheduled to go into wide release a few weeks later for the Christmas season. Just two days after the premiere, the Japanese Imperial Forces attacked Pearl Harbor, causing the United States to officially enter World War II. Paramount, feeling audiences were now no longer in the mood for a light-hearted animated film about insects, decided to cancel the Christmas release of Mr. Bug without telling anyone at Fleischer Studios.

Meanwhile, at the Miami Studio, the Fleischer staff (assuming the film was doing well) celebrated the completion of their second animated feature at the annual Christmas party. Max was reported to be in high-spirits and was looking forward to resuming creative control of the studio now that Dave was gone. While the studio was closed over the Christmas break, Max received an unexpected call from the President of Paramount, Barney Balaban ordering him to come to an emergency meeting in New York on December 23. When Max arrived at the meeting, he was greeted by Balaban and several other Paramount executives. When the meeting began, Balaban immediately said: "Max, we have decided to accept your resignation." Max, shocked, confused and devastated, responded: “This is all very puzzling. What is the purpose of this?” Balaban simply snapped: “That’s our decision,” and abruptly ended the meeting.

Max Fleischer officially submitted his letter of resignation on January 6, 1942. The staff returned after their Christmas break, to learn Max Fleischer was gone and the studio was under new management. Paramount spent the next five months completing the remaining Fleischer Popeye and Superman cartoons, with studio manager Sam Buchwald being put in charge. Mr. Bug Goes to Town eventually had a limited release in America on February 1942 in New York and California, the latter as the second half of a double feature with the film Sullivan's Travels. Both screenings lasted a week before being pulled from theatres, and the film became a box-office bomb as a result. The last cartoon produced at the credited Fleischer Studios was the Superman cartoon Terror on the Midway.

Fleischer historian Ray Pointer theorizes that Balaban (who commissioned both Fleischer animated features) realised in the wake of Pearl Harbour that Mr. Bug Goes to Town would be a flop, and fired Max Fleischer in order to set him up as the "fall guy" for his decisions and "save face" in front of Paramount's Board of Directors and it’s chairman Adolph Zukor. Steven Losie, however, argued that Pearl Harbour likely would not have an effect to the films performance have Paramount not mishandled its release.

In his 2005 book Out of the Inkwell, Max's son Richard Fleischer claimed that since the Fleischer's most popular series - Popeye the Sailor - was licensed property from King Features Syndicate, Paramount was forced to divide the royalties three ways: between themselves, King Features and Fleischer Studios. Therefore, he alleged that Paramount had secretly conspired to take over the studio and force his father out in order to increase their share of profits. In 1957, Max Fleischer wrote a letter to his lawyer Stanley Handman, recalling an incident in the mid-1930s shortly after Paramount vice-president Emanuel Cohen left the company. Cohen invited Max to his house and tried to convince him to leave Paramount and join the new distribution company he was forming. Feeling a sense of loyalty to Paramount, Max turned down the offer, but Cohen warned him, "If you don't know how [bad] Paramount is doing you, you'll find out when it's too late." Max concluded the letter to Handman by simply saying, "He was right."

=== Famous Studios ===
On May 27, 1942, Paramount officially renamed Fleischer Studios as Famous Studios headed by Buchwald, Isadore Sparber and Max's son-in-law Seymour Kneitel. Unlike its predecessor, Famous Studios became noted for its unambitious cartoons of varying quality that followed trends set by other studios, especially after moving back to New York in mid-1943, though its cartoons featuring characters such as Casper the Friendly Ghost (created by Fleischer alumnus Joe Oriolo) were successful. Selling its assets to Harvey Comics and renamed Paramount Cartoon Studios in 1956, it ceased operations at the end of 1967.

== Legacy ==
=== Fleischer Studios today ===
Max Fleischer re-established Fleischer Studios, Inc. on April 2, 1956, as a holding company when preparing his lawsuit against Paramount and U.M. & M. TV Corporation. In 1958, Paramount sold its animated characters and cartoons produced by Famous Studios to Harvey Comics for $1.7 million.

At this time the copyright to Betty Boop was set to expire under the Copyright Act of 1909 after under 28 years, unless it was renewed for another 28 years by the copyright holder. While reading The Wall Street Journal, Max's attorney – Stanley Handman – discovered that the United States Congress had recently passed an amendment to the law, which stated that if the author of a copyrighted work was still alive and hadn't assigned renewal rights in a work-for-hire project, the rights would revert to the original author. Since Max was still alive, hadn't given renewal rights, and neither Paramount nor Harvey were interested in renewing the copyright for what they considered an antiquated character, Max – following Handman's advice – swooped in and renewed the copyright to Betty Boop himself on June 25, 1959; thus reclaiming ownership of the character. As his son Richard, wrote: "Thanks to Stanley Handman's watchful eye, Betty Boop stayed where she belonged: in the loving hands of her creator, Max Fleischer."

Today, Fleischer Studios is an independent company, run by Max Fleischer's descendants. The company manages the rights and merchandising to Betty Boop and associated characters, such as Koko the Clown, Bimbo and Grampy. It is currently headed by Max's grandson Mark Fleischer, who oversees merchandising activities. Fleischer Studios utilizes the King Features Syndicate to license Fleischer characters for various merchandise.

=== Influence ===
The loose, improvisatory animation, frequently surreal action generally termed "The New York Style" (particularly in films such as Snow White and Bimbo's Initiation), grungy atmosphere, and racy pre-Code content of the early Fleischer Studios cartoons have been a major influence on many underground and alternative cartoonists. Kim Deitch, Robert Crumb, Jim Woodring, and Al Columbia are among the creators who have specifically acknowledged their inspiration. Much of Richard Elfman's 1980 cult film Forbidden Zone is a live action pastiche of the early Fleischer Studios style. The Fleischer style was also used in the 1995 animated series The Twisted Tales of Felix the Cat. The studio's art style and surreal atmosphere was a central influence on the 2017 independent-developed video game Cuphead, with the studio being described as "magnetic north" for the game's art style, even as well featuring other independent-developed video games between besides Cuphead, including Bendy and the Ink Machine and Enchanted Portals, that they honored the 1930s Fleischer Studios' art style at all. Genndy Tartakovsky has also cited the works of the studio as a major inspiration for the look of his 2023 animated series Unicorn: Warriors Eternal.

=== Honors ===
In 1985, DC Comics named Fleischer Studios as one of the honorees in the company's 50th anniversary publication Fifty Who Made DC Great for its work on the Superman cartoons.

In 2025, the Florida Historical Society, in association with the Fleischer Studios and Animation Education Association, installed a historic marker at the site of the former Fleischer Studio in Miami, Florida highlighting the studio's contributions to cinema.

== Ownership and licensing ==
While the current iteration of Fleischer Studios retains ownership of the original characters created by the studio (while the licensed characters of Popeye and Superman are owned by King Features Syndicate and DC Comics respectively), the rights to the cartoons themselves are in other hands.

In the mid-the 1950s, as with several other major Hollywood studios at the time, Paramount severely underestimated the value of their back catalogue, and sold most of their film and short subject library off to various television syndication companies. Most notably Paramount sold off all their live-action feature films from 1929–1949 to MCA's EMKA, Ltd. (now owned by Universal Pictures).

In the case of the Fleischer cartoons, the rights were previously divided between two separate companies: Warner Bros. owned all the Popeye and Superman cartoons, and their original distributor Paramount Pictures owned the remaining Fleischer cartoons (including the feature films Mr. Bug Goes to Town); the two studios became sister companies in 2026. Many of the cartoons, however, have fallen into the public domain.

=== U.M. & M. TV Corporation ===
In January 1956, Paramount sold the Pre-October 1950 Fleischer and Famous Studios cartoons (excluding Popeye and Superman) to U.M. & M. TV Corporation for $3 million. This included the rights to all of Fleischer's Out of the Inkwell (after 1927), Screen Songs, Talkartoons, Betty Boop, Color Classics, Stone Age, Animated Antics and Gabby cartoons, as well as the two reel "specials" Raggedy Ann and Andy and The Raven and the feature films Gulliver's Travels and Mr. Bug Goes to Town. U.M. & M. only lasted for another year, and in 1957 they were bought out by National Telefilm Associates (NTA).

Since Paramount still considered television as a competitor and did not want its name associated with it at the time, a condition of the U.M. & M. purchase required the removal of the Paramount logos and copyright lines from the opening and closing credits. When it came to the black and white Fleischer cartoons, U.M. & M made many of these changes directly into the original camera negatives. U.M. & M was purchased by NTA before they could finish retitling all the cartoons, so NTA placed their logos on many of the color cartoons instead. Since cartoons made in Cinecolor and Technicolor required multiple negatives, in order to save money NTA made duplicate prints off the negatives, and altered the copies instead. This included removed the Paramount logos and blacking out the names of Paramount - as well as references to Cinecolor and Technicolor - on the opening titles.

In 1984, NTA changed its name to Republic Pictures after the original B-Picture studio, whose library NTA had also acquired. Republic was subsequently purchased by Spelling Entertainment in 1994, before eventually being acquired by Paramount's parent company Viacom (now Skydance) - ironically placing them back in the hands of their original distributor (under Republic Pictures)

While Paramount currently owns the ancillary rights and the original camera negatives to theses cartoons, U.M. & M and NTA neglected and failed to renew the copyrights on many of these cartoons, resulting in the majority of the Fleischer cartoons in this library falling into the public domain, including the feature films, various Betty Boop cartoons, and the 1938 Color Classic, The Tears of an Onion, are among the few entries in this library still under copyright to Paramount.

=== Popeye and Superman ===
In June 1956, Paramount sold the entirety of the Fleischer/Famous Studios Popeye cartoons from 1933 to 1957 to Associated Artists Productions (which had also recently purchased much of the Warner Bros. back catalogue) for $1.25 million. Like the previous U.M. & M deal, A.A.P was required to remove the Paramount logos from the Popeye cartoons, but was allowed to keep Paramount's name in the copyright on the title cards.

Two years later, the assets of A.A.P. were in turn purchased by United Artists in 1958. In 1981, United Artists merged with Metro-Goldwyn-Mayer to form MGM/UA. In 1986, Ted Turner's Turner Broadcasting System acquired MGM/UA, but due to debt concerns, Turner was forced to sell the company back to its previous owner Kirk Kerkorian after only 74 days of ownership. However, Turner kept most of the pre-May 1986 MGM library as well as a few portions of the United Artists library, including the former A.A.P. catalogue (and by extension the Popeye cartoons). He subsequently formed his own holding company Turner Entertainment Co. to manage the rights. In 1996, Turner Broadcasting merged with Time-Warner (now Skydance). Since then, Warner Bros. controls the rights to the theatrical Popeye cartoons via Turner Entertainment Co.

Due to the library being under better management than U.M & M/NTA, the majority of Popeye cartoons are currently still under copyright with only ten Popeye cartoons currently in the public domain.

As per their original contract, the rights to the Superman cartoons reverted to National Comics after Paramount's deal expired in 1947. While the cartoons themselves are now in the public domain after their original copyrights were not renewed, the ancillary rights are still owned by DC Comics, and the cartoons (in authorized editions from the original negatives) are distributed by Warner Bros., which has owned DC since 1969.

=== Fleischer lawsuits ===
As soon as the Fleischer library was sold to television, Max Fleischer began noticing that some of the cartoons were being shown without his name in the credits, which was a violation of his original contracts. On June 17, 1956, Max Fleischer filed suit against Paramount, U.M. & M. TV Corporation, National Telefilm Associates and associated parties, seeking $2,750,000 in damages. Max reportedly did this as a backdoor way of suing Paramount over the loss of his studio. After stalling out in the court for several years, the judge ultimately dismissed the case based on Statute of limitations.

Due to the publicity of Max's lawsuit, Dave Fleischer also filed his own separate suit against A.A.P. and United Artists on October 14, 1957. His case ultimately reached the United States Supreme Court in 1963, but was cancelled due to the Warren Commission's investigation of the Assassination of John F. Kennedy.

Despite both losing the case, both NTA and United Artists corrected the infringement on their names on all subsequent prints shown on television.

=== Home video ===
Most of the Fleischer color titles have been widely available on video since the 1980s, often on inexpensive videotapes sold in supermarkets and discount stores. Animation fans, the UCLA Film and Television Archive, and more recently the Max Fleischer estate and Paramount Pictures (via the Republic/Melange library) have worked to release high-quality restored editions of the Fleischer cartoons. These have also been made available on pay-cable, home video, DVD, and online on YouTube. Many of these restored versions now include the original front-and-end Paramount titles.

Most of the silent Fleischer titles from the Out of the Inkwell/Inkwell Imps series have entered the public domain.

An official Betty Boop VHS set, Betty Boop Confidential, was released by Republic Pictures in 1995, included several black-and-white Betty Boop cartoons as well as Betty's only color appearance, Poor Cinderella.

There have been several video releases for the Superman series. These include a 1991 VHS set produced by Bosko Video, titled The Complete Superman Collection: Golden Anniversary Edition – The Paramount Cartoon Classics of Max & Dave Fleischer released as two volumes which featured transfers from 35mm prints. It was reissued on DVD as The Complete Superman Cartoons — Diamond Anniversary Edition in 2000 by Image Entertainment, and Superman Adventures in 2004 by Platinum Disc Corporation.

A third (and more "official") compilation using restored and remastered materials was released in November 2006 by Warner Home Video as part of their DVD box set of Superman films. In 2009, Warner gave these Superman shorts their own stand-alone 2-disc DVD release, Max Fleischer's Superman: 1941–1942.

Olive Films, under exclusive license from Melange/Viacom, acquired the rights to the 66 non-public domain Betty Boop cartoons, and released four volumes of Betty Boop DVDs and Blu-rays.

Warner Home Video released all of the Fleischer Popeye cartoons in three volumes as part of the Popeye the Sailor DVD collection.

VCI Entertainment/Kit Parker Films' DVD compilation of all the Color Classics (except The Tears of an Onion), entitled Somewhere In Dreamland, was released in 2003. It includes only a fraction of shorts remastered from 35mm film, but otherwise taken from the best available sources Kit Parker could provide VCI, and digitally recreating the original front-and-end Paramount titles. Animation archivist Jerry Beck served as consultant for this box set, as well as providing audio commentary for select shorts.

VCI Entertainment also released a DVD compilation of all the public domain Popeye cartoons (both Fleischer and Famous) entitled Popeye the Sailor Man Classic Cartoons: 75th Anniversary Collector's Edition in 2004.

In Japan, Mr. Bug Goes to Town was released on DVD in April 2010 by Walt Disney Studios Home Entertainment as part of the Studio Ghibli's Ghibli Museum Library collection.

In 2021, after decades of being shown in altered and worn prints, the Fabulous Fleischer Cartoons Restored company was started by Max Fleischer's granddaughter, Jane Fleischer Reid, to focus on the restoration and screening of the Fleischer Studios library. The restoration efforts are a collaboration between film archives around the world including Paramount Pictures which owns the original camera negatives. Beginning with Somewhere in Dreamland; the restored cartoon had its premiere on the MeTV network in December of the same year. In March 2023, a week long screening event took place at the Museum of Modern Art which showcased around 60 brand new Fleischer restorations.

=== Current ownership ===
In October 2026, Paramount Skydance purchased Warner Bros. Discovery (after which Paramount Skydance was renamed to Skydance Corporation). The acquisition reunited the entire Fleischer Studios library under Skydance's ownership.

== Filmography ==
Public domain	Partially public domain	Copyrighted material	Status unclear

Title	Theatrical release	Copyright status	Notes
Screen Songs	1929–1938	Partially public domain	Inherited by Famous Studios.
Finding His Voice	June 21, 1929	Public domain	For Western Electric.
Talkartoons	1929–1932	Partially public domain	–
In My Merry Oldsmobile	March 1, 1931	Public domain	For Olds Motor Division.
A Jolt for General Jerm	May 21, 1931	Public domain	For Lysol.
Step on It	May 21, 1931	Public domain	For Texaco.
Tex in 1999	1931	Public domain	For Texaco.
Suited to a Tea	1931	Public domain	For Indian Tea Company.
Betty Boop	1932–1939	Partially public domain	–
Popeye the Sailor	1933–1942	Partially public domain	Inherited by Famous Studios.
Popeye the Sailor Meets Sindbad the Sailor	November 27, 1936	Public domain	Popeye Color Special
Popeye the Sailor Meets Ali Baba's Forty Thieves	November 26, 1937	Public domain	Popeye Color Special
Aladdin and His Wonderful Lamp	April 7, 1939	Public domain	Popeye Color Special
Color Classics	1934–1941	Partially public domain	All 36 shorts are currently public domain except for Little Dutch Mill, Educated Fish, Little Lamby, The Tears of an Onion and The Playful Polar Bears.
Stone Age Cartoons	1940	Partially Public domain	–
Animated Antics	1940–1941	Unclear	–
Gabby	1940–1941	Partially public domain	All 8 shorts are currently public domain except for The Constable.
Raggedy Ann and Raggedy Andy	April 11, 1941	Copyrighted material	Copyright renewed by National Telefilm Associates (now Republic Pictures) in 1968.
Superman	1941–1942	Public domain	Inherited by Famous Studios; ancillary rights (such as merchandising) retained by Warner Bros. Entertainment, but all original episodes are public domain.
The Raven	April 3, 1942	Copyrighted material	Copyright renewed by National Telefilm Associates (now Republic Pictures) in 1970.

Feature films
Title	Theatrical release	Director	Copyright status	Notes
Gulliver's Travels	December 22, 1939	Dave Fleischer	Public domain	–
Mr. Bug Goes to Town	December 4, 1941	Dave Fleischer	Unclear	Copyright currently held by Republic Pictures (managed by parent company Paramount Skydance), but film has been regularly rereleased by unrelated public domain companies.

== Fleischer Studios, Inc. staff: (1929–1942) ==
=== Producers ===
- Max Fleischer
- Dave Fleischer (1940–1942)

=== Directors ===
- Dave Fleischer (Note: Since gaining distribution through Paramount, Dave Fleischer is credited as director for every single cartoon despite serving as supervisor and head storyman. The actual director of each cartoon is typically the first listed animator.)

=== Writers ===
- Eric St. Clair
- Pinto Colvig
- Max Fleischer
- Dave Fleischer
- Warren Foster
- Dan Gordon
- Cal Howard
- Seymour Kneitel
- George Manuell
- Jack Mercer
- Carl Meyer
- Tedd Pierce
- Graham Place
- Hal Seeger
- Edmond Seward
- Isadore Sparber
- David Tendlar
- William Turner
- Jack Ward
- Bob Wickersham

=== Animators ===
- Tom Baron
- Bob Bemiller
- Thomas Bonfiglio
- Eli Brucker
- Robert Bentley
- Willard Bowsky
- Orestes Calpini
- Joel Clive
- Herman Cohen
- Roland Crandall
- James Culhane
- Joe D'Igalo
- Ugo D'Orsi
- James Davis
- Nelson Demorest
- Anthony Di Paola
- H.C Ellison
- Frank Endres
- Al Eugster
- Otto Feuer
- Don Figlozzi
- Dave Fleischer
- Max Fleischer
- Lillian Friedman Astor
- George Germanetti
- Arnold Gillespie
- Tom Golden
- Reuben Grossman
- Charles Hastings
- William Henning
- Winfield Hoskins
- Tom Johnson
- Abner Kneitel (also credited as Abner Matthews)
- Seymour Kneitel
- Bob Leffingwell
- Michael Maltese
- Carl Meyer
- Thomas Moore
- George Moreno Jr.
- Steve Muffati
- Grim Natwick
- Bill Nolan
- Joe Oriolo
- Sid Pillet
- Graham Place
- Lod Rossner
- Ted Sears
- Hal Seeger
- Gordon Sheehan
- Ben Solomon
- Irving Spector
- Frank Spalding
- Sam Stimson
- William Sturm
- Dave Tendlar
- Jim Tyer
- Edith Vernick
- Myron Waldman
- Harold Walker
- John Walworth
- Bob Wickersham
- Bernard Wolf
- Lou Zukor

=== Layout and scenic artists ===
- Eddi Bowlds
- Hemia Calpini
- Robert Connavale
- Robert Little
- Anton Loeb
- Shane Miller
- Erich Schenk
- Gustaf Tenggren

=== Photographers ===
- Leonard McCormick

=== Voice actors ===
- Joan Alexander
- Dave Barry
- Jackson Beck
- Bud Collyer
- Pinto Colvig
- William Costello
- Margie Hines
- Cal Howard
- Little Ann Little
- Jack Mercer
- Billy Murray
- Julian Noa
- William Pennell
- Walter Van Brunt
- Tedd Pierce
- Bonnie Poe
- Mae Questel
- Ann Rothschild
- Gus Wickie
- Kate Wright

=== Musical supervisor and arrangements ===
- Lou Fleischer (supervisor, 1930–1942)
- George Steiner (1930–1935)
- Sammy Timberg (1932–1942)
- Winston Sharples (1940–1942)

== See also ==
- Animation in the United States during the silent era
- The Golden Age of American animation
- Rubber hose animation
- Famous Studios
- List of animation studios
- Camera Effects

== Bibliography ==
- Barrier, Michael (2003). Hollywood Cartoons: American Animation in Its Golden Age (Revised ed.). New York City, New York: Oxford University Press. ISBN 978-0199839223.
- Cabarga, Leslie (1988). The Fleischer Story (Revised ed.). New York City, New York: Da Capo Press. ISBN 978-0306803130.
- Crafton, Donald (1993). Before Mickey: The Animated Film 1898-1928 (Kindle ed.). Chicago, Illinois: University of Chicago Press. ISBN 978-0226231020.
- Cullhane, Shamus (1998). Talking Animals and Other People: The Autobiography of A Legendary Animator (Paperback ed.). New York City, New York: Da Capo Press. ISBN 978-0306808302.
- Fleischer, Richard (2005). Out of the Inkwell: Max Fleischer and the Animation Revolution. Lexington, Kentucky: The University Press of Kentucky. ISBN 978-0813134642.
- Maltin, Leonard (1987). Of Mice and Magic: A History of American Animated Cartoons (Revised ed.). New York City, New York: Plume. ISBN 978-0452259935.
- Pointer, Ray (2017). The Art and Inventions of Max Fleischer: American Animation Pioneer. Jefferson, North Carolina: McFarland & Company. ISBN 978-1-4766-6367-8.
