= Koko the Clown =

Cartoon character

- Out of the Inkwell, Talkartoons, Betty Boop character
- First appearance: Experiment No. 1 (1918)
- Created by: Max Fleischer, Dave Fleischer
- Voiced by: Claude Reese (1931–1934); Cab Calloway (1933); Larry Storch (1960–1961); Danny Bravin (1980)

Koko the Clown is a cartoon character created by Max Fleischer. His first appearance was as the main protagonist in Out of the Inkwell (1918–1929), a major animated series of the silent era. Throughout the series, he goes on many adventures with his canine companion "Fitz the Dog", who would later evolve into Bimbo in the Betty Boop cartoons.

== History ==
The character originated when Max Fleischer invented the rotoscope, a device that allowed for animation to be more lifelike by tracing motion picture footage of human movement. The use of the clown character came after two previous tests and a search for an original character. Fleischer filmed his brother Dave in a clown costume. After tracing the film footage amounting to some 2,500 drawings and a year's work, the character that would eventually become Koko the Clown was born, although he did not have a name until 1924. "The Clown"'s appearance owes much to The Yama Yama Man. Dave's clown costume was clearly inspired by one worn by Bessie McCoy, with the additions of a black ruffled collar replacing the big white bow, three pom-pom front buttons, and a prominent cone-shaped cap also with three pom-poms. The white face with slit eyes was a design common among German circus clowns. Both costumes have white gloves with long fingers, white foot coverings, and a hat with the same white pom-pom as in front. A 1922 sheet music drawing makes the connection more explicit, saying "Out of the Inkwell, the New Yama Yama Clown", with a picture of Koko.

Because of the realistic effects displayed in his sample films, the result of Fleischer's Rotoscope, and a past relationship with John R. Bray, he was hired as production manager for John R. Bray Studios, and in 1918 they began Out of the Inkwell as an entry in the Bray Pictograph Screen Magazine released through Paramount (1918), and later Goldwyn (1919-1921). Aside from the novelty of the Rotoscoped animation, this series combined live-action and animation centered on Max Fleischer as the creative cartoonist and "Master" of "The Clown". "The Clown" would often slip from Max's eye and go on an adventure or pull a prank on his creator. Fleischer wrote and animated the early shorts along with Roland Crandall, with Dave directing the live action filming, performing on camera as "The Clown" for Rotoscoping, and assisted with the animation and Roto tracings.

The series was very popular, and in 1921 Max and Dave Fleischer formed their own studio, Out of the Inkwell Films, Inc. Their films were distributed through the States Rights method through Warner Bros., Winkler Pictures, Standard, and finally The Red Seal Pictures Corporation. The "Clown" was named Ko-Ko in 1924 when Dick Huemer came to the studio as their animation supervisor, having animated on the Mutt and Jeff series for eight years. He redesigned the "Clown" for more efficient animation production and moved the Fleischers away from their dependency upon the Rotoscope for fluid animation. Huemer created Ko-Ko's canine companion, Fitz. Most importantly, Huemer set the drawing style that gave the series its distinctive look. The illustration at the heading is an example by Huemer.

In the films produced from 1924 to 1927, the clown's name was hyphenated, "Ko-Ko". The hyphen was dropped due to legal issues associated with the bankruptcy of the Fleischer's partnership company, The Red Seal Pictures Corporation. Alfred Weiss presented the Fleischers with a new Paramount contract beginning in mid-1927, and "Out of the Inkwell" was retitled as "The Inkwell Imps". The series continued for two years until July 1929, ending with "Chemical Koko". Due to alleged mismanagement under Alfred Weiss, the Inkwell Studios filed bankruptcy in January 1929, and Koko was put into retirement for two years. In 1931, the legal entanglements regarding Koko were resolved, and he returned to the screen beginning with "The Herring Murder Case" (1931) and became a regular in the new Fleischer Talkartoons series with costars, Betty Boop and Bimbo. Koko's last theatrical appearance was in the "Betty Boop" cartoon "Ha! Ha! Ha!" (1934), a remake of an "Out of the Inkwell" silent film, "The Cure" (1924).

== Koko in "Kolor" ==
Koko's first color appearance was a cameo in the cartoon "Toys Will Be Toys" (1949), one of the revived Screen Songs series produced by Famous Studios. In 1958, Max Fleischer set out to revive Out of the Inkwell for television, and a series of 100 color episodes were produced in 1960–1961 by Hal Seeger using the voice talents of Larry Storch. Only seven episodes are known to still exist.

== See also ==
- Song Car-Tunes
- Animation in the United States during the silent era
- Golden age of American animation
