= 1932 in animation =

Events in 1932 in animation.

== Events ==
=== February ===
- February 26: The Fleischer Studios release the Betty Boop cartoon Minnie the Moocher, which has jazz musician Cab Calloway as a special guest voice.

=== April ===
- April 16: Harman and Ising's Merrie Melodies cartoon Goopy Geer produced by Leon Schlesinger Productions premieres, It marks the debut of the title character Goopy Geer.

=== May ===
- May 25: Wilfred Jackson's Mickey Mouse cartoon Mickey's Revue, premieres. Goofy makes his debut in this short film.

=== July ===
- July 30: Walt Disney releases the studio's first animated short in color: Flowers and Trees. While not the historical first, it will lead to other animation studios also gradually switching to color in the following years.

=== November ===
- November 18: 5th Academy Awards:
  - Walt Disney produces a special animated reel to announce some of the nominees for Best Actor, Parade of the Award Nominees. During the same ceremony, Disney receives an Honorary Academy Award for the creation of Mickey Mouse, marking the first time an Oscar is given to an animator and his animated cartoon star.
  - The first Academy Award for Best Animated Short is handed out. The winner is Walt Disney's Flowers and Trees.
- November 25: The Fleischer Studios release the Betty Boop cartoon I'll Be Glad When You're Dead You Rascal You, which has jazz musician Louis Armstrong as a special guest voice.

== Films released ==
- 4 January:
  - Any Rags? (United States)
  - Chinatown Mystery (United States)
  - Piano Mover (United States)
- 9 January:
  - Bosko at the Zoo (United States)
  - Sweet Jennie Lee (United States)
- 10 January – The Villain's Curse (United States)
- 16 January:
  - The Bird Store (United States)
  - Boop-Oop-a-Doop (United States)
- 24 January – Noah's Outing (United States)
- 30 January:
  - Love Krazy (United States)
  - Rocketeers (United States)
  - Show Me the Way to Go Home (United States)
- 31 January – Pagan Moon (United States)
- 6 February – Battling Bosko (United States)
- 7 February – The Spider Talks (United States)
- 13 February – Hollywood Goes Krazy (United States)
- 19 February – When the Red, Red Robin Comes Bob, Bob, Bobbin' Along (United States)
- 20 February:
  - Freddy the Freshman (United States)
  - The Milkman (United States)
- 21 February – Peg Leg Pete (United States)
- 25 February – Treasure Runt (United States)
- 26 February – Minnie the Moocher (United States)
- 27 February – Rabid Hunters (United States)
- 4 March – Wait Till the Sun Shines, Nellie (United States)
- 5 March:
  - Big-Hearted Bosko (United States)
  - Fire-Fire (United States)
- 6 March – Play Ball (United States)
- 11 March – Swim or Sink (United States)
- 14 March – What a Knight (United States)
- 19 March – Crosby, Columbo, and Vallee (United States)
- 20 March – Ye Olde Songs (United States)
- 25 March – Crazy Town (United States)
- 26 March:
  - In the Bag (United States)
  - What A Life (United States)
- 31 March – Railroad Wretch (United States)
- 1 April – Just One More Chance (United States)
- 2 April – Soldier Old Man (United States)
- 3 April – Bull-ero (United States)
- 8 April – The Dancing Fool (United States)
- 13 April:
  - Birth of Jazz (United States)
  - Chess-Nuts (United States)
- 16 April – Goopy Geer (United States)
- 17 April – Radio Girl (United States)
- 22 April – Oh! How I Hate to Get Up in the Morning (United States)
- 23 April – Joint Wipers (United States)
- 28 April – The Pet Shop (United States)
- 30 April – Puppy Love (United States)
- 1 May – Woodland (United States)
- 6 May – Shine On Harvest Moon (United States)
- 9 May – Ritzy Hotel (United States)
- 14 May:
  - It's Got Me Again! (United States)
  - Pots and Pans (United States)
  - School Days (United States)
- 15 May – Romance (United States)
- 17 May – Stepping Stones (United States)
- 20 May – Let Me Call You Sweetheart (United States)
- 25 May – Mickey's Revue (United States)
- 28 May – Hic-Cups the Champ (United States)
- 29 May – Bluebeard's Brother (United States)
- 31 May – Battle of the Barn (United States)
- 4 June:
  - Plane Dumb (United States)
  - The Tuba Tooter (United States)
- 11 June – Moonlight for Two (United States)
- 12 June – Farmer Al Falfa's Bedtime Story (United States)
- 17 June – I Ain't Got Nobody (United States)
- 18 June – The Bully (United States)
- 21 June – Paper Hanger (United States)
- 26 June – The Mad King (United States)
- 2 July – Fare-Play (United States)
- 9 July – The Bears and the Bees (United States)
- 10 July – Cocky Cock Roach (United States)
- 16 July – The Office Boy (United States)
- 18 July – Mickey in Arabia (United States)
- 23 July – Redskin Blues (United States)
- 24 July – Spring Is Here (United States)
- 29 July – You Try Somebody Else (United States)
- 30 July:
  - Flowers and Trees (United States)
  - Just Dogs (United States)
- 5 August – Rudy Vallee Melodies (United States)
- 7 August – Farmer Al Falfa's Ape Girl (United States)
- 10 August – Camping Out (United States)
- 12 August – Stopping the Show (United States)
- 13 August:
  - Bosko's Store (United States)
  - Mickey's Nightmare (United States)
  - Room Runners (United States)
- 15 August – Lighthouse Keeping (United States)
- 19 August:
  - Betty Boop's Bizzy Bee (United States)
  - Jolly Fish (United States)
- 21 August – Sherman Was Right (United States)
- 22 August – Stormy Seas (United States)
- 26 August – Down Among the Sugar Cane (United States)
- 27 August – Circus (United States)
- 2 September – Betty Boop, M.D. (United States)
- 3 September – Bosko the Lumberjack (United States)
- 4 September – Burlesque (United States)
- 9 September – Just a Gigolo (United States)
- 10 September:
  - King Neptune (United States)
  - Southern Rhythm (United States)
- 12 September – Seeing Stars (United States)
- 16 September – Barnyard Bunk (United States)
- 17 September:
  - Ride Him, Bosko! (United States)
  - The Black Sheep (United States)
  - The Whoopee Party (United States)
- 23 September – Betty Boop's Bamboo Isle (United States)
- 30 September – School Days (United States)
- 1 October – Bugs in Love (United States)
- 2 October – Farmer Al Falfa's Birthday Party (United States)
- 3 October – The Goal Rush (United States)
- 7 October – A Spanish Twist (United States)
- 8 October – Prosperity Blues (United States)
- 14 October – Betty Boop's Ups and Downs (United States)
- 16 October – College Spirit (United States)
- 20 October – The Great Bird Mystery (United States)
- 21 October – Romantic Melodies (United States)
- 27 October – The Pony Express (United States)
- 29 October – The Music Lesson (United States)
- 30 October – Hook and Ladder No. 1 (United States)
- 4 November – Betty Boop for President (United States)
- 7 November – The Crystal Gazebo (United States)
- 9 November – Flop House (United States)
- 11 November:
  - Piano Tooners (United States)
  - Sleepy Time Down South (United States)
- 12 November – A Great Big Bunch of You (United States)
- 13 November – The Forty Thieves (United States)
- 18 November – Parade of the Award Nominees (United States)
- 19 November – Babes in the Woods (United States)
- 21 November – The Minstrel Show (United States)
- 25 November – I'll Be Glad When You're Dead You Rascal You (United States)
- 26 November – Nurse Maid (United States)
- 27 November – Toyland (United States)
- 30 November – Snow Time (United States)
- 1 December – The Bad Genius (United States)
- 2 December – Sing a Song (United States)
- 9 December – Pencil Mania (United States)
- 10 December:
  - Santa's Workshop (United States)
  - Three's a Crowd (United States)
- 11 December – Hollywood Diet (United States)
- 16 December – Betty Boop's Museum (United States)
- 17 December – Mickey's Good Deed (United States)
- 23 December – Time on My Hands (United States)
- 24 December – Funny Face (United States)
- 25 December – Ireland Or Bust (United States)
- 29 December – The Wolf at the Door (United States)

== Births ==
=== January ===
- January 3: Dabney Coleman, American actor (portrayed Dr. Beechwood in Stuart Little, voice of Monsieur Fox in the Happily Ever After: Fairy Tales for Every Child episode "Aesop's Fables: A Whodunit Musical", Principal Prickly in Recess, Ashton Phillips in Jumanji, Mayor Jerry in Pound Puppies, Thomas Boyle in The Zeta Project episode "Hunt in the Hub", Horace Scope in The Magic School Bus episode "Sees Stars"), (d. 2024).
- January 11:
  - Tadanari Okamoto, Japanese film director and producer (Echo Incorporated), (d. 1990).
  - Alfonso Arau, Mexican filmmaker, actor, and singer (voice of Papá Julio in Coco).
- January 13: Jon Cypher, American actor (voice of Ira Billings / Spellbinder in Batman Beyond, Administrator in the Pinky and the Brain episode "Bah, Wilderness"), (d. 2026).
- January 14: Gloria Rocha, Mexican voice actress (Latin American dub voice of Olive Oyl in Popeye, Sorceress in He-Man and the Masters of the Universe and She-Ra: Princess of Power, Tweety in Looney Tunes, Melody in Josie and the Pussycats, Velma Dinkley in Scooby-Doo), and voice director (Dragon Ball Z, Sailor Moon), (d. 2026).
- January 24: Julie Bennett, American voice actress (voice of Penelope Pussycat in Louvre Come Back to Me!, Cindy Bear in The Yogi Bear Show, Aunt May in seasons 4 and 5 of Spider-Man), (d. 2020).
- January 30: Gino Conforti, American character actor (voice of Jacquimo in Thumbelina, Ollie Oilslick and Reggie Unicycle in Galaxy High, Benzino Gasolinl in DuckTales).

=== February ===
- February 10: Barrie Ingham, English actor (voice of Basil in The Great Mouse Detective), (d. 2015).
- February 11: Bob Yerkes, American stuntman (Who Framed Roger Rabbit), (d. 2024).
- February 16: Harry Goz, American actor (voice of Mayor Huffenmeier in Buster & Chauncey's Silent Night, Captain Hazel "Hank" Murphy in Sealab 2021), (d. 2003).
- February 22: Ted Kennedy, American lawyer and politician (guest starred in the Fetch! with Ruff Ruffman episode "Mr. Ruffman Goes to Washington"), (d. 2009).
- February 23:
  - Majel Barrett, American actress (voice of Christine Chapel and Lt. M'Ress in Star Trek: The Animated Series, Anna Watson in Spider-Man), (d. 2008).
  - Gerrianne Raphael, American former actress (voice of Pumyra, Jagara, Chilla, Soundora, Snake, Octopus, Pilot and Thunderean in ThunderCats, Pad in the A Little Curious episode "Push Pull Rock", additional voices in The Comic Strip, Courage the Cowardly Dog, and Kenny the Shark).
- February 24:
  - Michel Legrand, French composer (The Smurfs and the Magic Flute), (d. 2019).
  - John Vernon, Canadian actor (voice of Rupert Thorne in Batman: The Animated Series, Iron Man and Namor in The Marvel Super Heroes, Thunderbolt Ross in The Incredible Hulk, Shao Kahn in Mortal Kombat: Defenders of the Realm, Prosecutor in Heavy Metal, the title character in Wildfire, Warden Toadblatt in The Grim Adventures of Billy & Mandy, Nohrin Judge in Delgo, Doctor Strange in the Spider-Man episode of the same name, Principal Dinkler in the Duckman episode "From Brad to Worse"), (d. 2005).
- February 26: Johnny Cash, American country singer (voice of the Space Coyote in The Simpsons episode "El Viaje Misterioso de Nuestro Jomer (The Mysterious Voyage of Homer)"), (d. 2003).
- February 27: Elizabeth Taylor, English-American actress (voice of Mrs. Andrews in the Captain Planet and the Planeteers episode "A Formula for Hate", Sarah in the God, the Devil and Bob episode "God's Girlfriend", Maggie Simpson and herself in The Simpsons episodes "Lisa's First Word" and "Krusty Gets Kancelled"), (d. 2011).
- February 28: Don Francks, Canadian actor (voice of Mok in Rock & Rule, Boba Fett in Star Wars: Droids, Umwak in Star Wars: Ewoks, Dr. Fright and The Vizier in Care Bears, Sabretooth in X-Men, second voice of Dr. Claw in Inspector Gadget), (d. 2016).
- February 29: Edward Faulkner, American actor (voice of Elf Ziggy in Elf Sparkle Meets Christmas the Horse, Chef Best in Elf Sparkle and the Special Red Dress) and director (Elf Sparkle and the Special Red Dress), (d. 2025).

=== March ===
- March 4:
  - Ian Freebairn-Smith, American composer (You're a Good Man, Charlie Brown), (d. 2025).
  - Frank Wells, American businessman (president and chief operating officer of The Walt Disney Company), (d. 1994).
- March 6: Tatsuo Yoshida, Japanese manga artist and animator (Speed Racer), (d. 1977).
- March 14:
  - Hiroshi Ōtake, Japanese voice actor (voice of Koike in Obake no Q-Tarō, 004 in Cyborg 009, Sanpei in Speed Racer, Parman No. 2 in Perman, Boss in Mazinger Z, King Nikochan in Dr. Slump), (d. 2022).
  - Claude T. Smith, American composer (John Henry and the Inky-Poo), (d. 1987).
- March 18: John Updike, American novelist, poet, short-story writer, art critic and literary critic (voiced himself in The Simpsons episode "Insane Clown Poppy"), (d. 2009).
- March 20: Tod Dockstader, American composer (Terrytoons, Kim Deitch) and sound effects artist (Tom and Jerry), (d. 2015).

=== April ===
- April 1: Debbie Reynolds, American actress and singer (voice of Charlotte in Charlotte's Web, Mitzi, Mrs. Claus, and Mrs. Prancer in Rudolph the Red-Nosed Reindeer: The Movie, Lulu Pickles in Rugrats, Nana Possible in Kim Possible), (d. 2016).
- April 12: Tiny Tim, American singer, ukulele player and musical archivist (performed the song "Livin' in the Sunlight, Lovin' in the Moonlight" which was used in the SpongeBob SquarePants episode "Help Wanted"), (d. 1996).
- April 14: Loretta Lynn, American singer and songwriter (voice of Deli Porkchop in the Happily Ever After: Fairy Tales for Every Child episode "The Three Little Pigs"), (d. 2022).
- April 18: Nic Broca, Belgian animator and comics artist (Ovide and the Gang, The Snorks), (d. 1993).
- April 22: Isao Tomita, Japanese composer (Osamu Tezuka), (d. 2026).
- April 25: Yoshiko Ōta, Japanese voice actress (voice of Nobita in Doraemon, Urasae in Inuyasha, Peebo in Choudenshi Bioman, Akko Kagami in Akko's Secret), (d. 2021).
- April 27: Casey Kasem, American actor (voice of Shaggy Rogers in the Scooby-Doo franchise, Robin in Super Friends, Cliffjumper in The Transformers, and the titular character in Here Comes Peter Cottontail), (d. 2014).

=== May ===
- May 8: Martin Starger, American producer (The Last Unicorn), (d. 2024).
- May 11: Josef Zima, Czech actor (Czech dub voice of Bashful in Snow White and the Seven Dwarfs, Kaa in The Jungle Book), (d. 2025).
- May 16: Brian Trueman, English screenwriter (Danger Mouse, Count Duckula, Chorlton and the Wheelies, Jamie and the Magic Torch, Cockleshell Bay, The Wind in the Willlows, Victor & Hugo: Bunglers in Crime, Truckers, Wallace & Gromit, Budgie the Little Helicopter, The Treacle People, Thomas & Friends, Jungle Junction) and actor (voice of the Narrator in Jamie and the Magic Torch, the Narrator in Cockleshell Bay, Weasels in The Wind in the Willows, Stiletto in Danger Mouse, Dorcas Del Icatessen in Truckers, Nanny in Count Duckula, Stilleto and Nanny in Victor & Hugo: Bunglers in Crime, Charlie in The Treacle People, Auntie Dame and Hunter in Franny's Feet), (d. 2024).
- May 27: Steve Franken, American actor (voice of Eugene Atwater in Road Rovers, Mr. Beal in Detention, Mr. Janus in the Static Shock episode "Grounded", Rundle in the Batman: The Animated Series episode "The Mechanic", President Generic in The Sylvester & Tweety Mysteries episode "Spooker of the House"), (d. 2012).

=== June ===
- June 9: Albert Cohen, Israeli actor (Hebrew dub voice of King Harold in the Shrek franchise, Mr. Smee in Peter Pan, Merlin in The Sword in the Stone, Anger in Inside Out, Vitruvius in The Lego Movie, Professor Derek Knight in Monsters University, Bulldog in Planes, Slinky Dog in Toy Story 4), (d. 2025).
- June 18: Dudley R. Herschbach, American chemist (voiced himself in The Simpsons episode "Treehouse of Horror XIV").
- June 22: Prunella Scales, English actress (voice of Mrs. Tiggy-Winkle in The World of Peter Rabbit and Friends, Queen in Freddie as F.R.O.7), (d. 2025).
- June 28: Pat Morita, Japanese-American actor and comedian (voice of Mr. Miyagi in the opening narration of The Karate Kid, The Emperor of China in Mulan and Mulan II, King Makahana in the Happily Ever After: Fairy Tales for Every Child episode "Puss in Boots", Mr. Straw in the Adventures from the Book of Virtues episode "Charity", Master Udon in the SpongeBob SquarePants episode "Karate Island", himself in the Robot Chicken episode "S&M Present"), (d. 2005).
- June 29: Soon-Tek Oh, Korean actor (voice of Zhou in Mulan), (d. 2018).

=== July ===
- July 6: Phyllida Law, Scottish actress (English dub voice of Sadako in the Optimum dub of Arrietty), (d. 2026).
- July 23: Jorge Arvizu, Mexican actor (Spanish dub voice of Bugs Bunny, Popeye, Fred Flintstone, Magilla Gorilla, Benny the Ball, and Choo-Choo in Top Cat: The Movie), (d. 2014).
- July 31: Ted Cassidy, American actor (voice of Lurch in The Addams Family and The New Scooby-Doo Movies episode "Wednesday is Missing", Frankenstein Jr. in Frankenstein Jr. and The Impossibles, Brainiac and Black Manta in Challenge of the Superfriends, Galactus in Fantastic Four, The Thing in The New Fantastic Four), (d. 1979).

=== August ===
- August 1: Ron Friedman, American screenwriter (G.I. Joe: A Real American Hero, G.I. Joe: The Movie, The Transformers, The Transformers: The Movie, The Romance of Betty Boop, Bionic Six, Fantastic Four, Iron Man), producer (Iron Man, Fantastic Four) and actor (voice of Blastaar in the Fantastic Four episode "Behold the Negative Zone", Record Producer in the Iron Man episode "Iron Man to the Second Power"), (d. 2025).
- August 2:
  - Dennis Marks, American screenwriter, producer (Batfink, Hanna-Barbera, Marvel Productions, Teenage Mutant Ninja Turtles, Batman: The Animated Series, Tom and Jerry: The Movie) and voice actor (voice of Green Goblin in the Spider-Man and His Amazing Friends episode "The Triumph of the Green Goblin"), (d. 2006).
  - Peter O'Toole, English actor (voice of Sherlock Holmes in Sherlock Holmes and the Baskerville Curse, Pantaloon in The Nutcracker Prince, Anton Ego in Ratatouille), (d. 2013).
- August 4: Guillermo Mordillo, Argentine cartoonist and animator (Estudios Galas, produced animated shorts based on his cartoons), (d. 2019).
- August 5: Ja'Net DuBois, American actress and singer (voice of Mrs. Avery in The PJs, Mrs. Patterson in As Told by Ginger, Grams Hinton in the G.I. Joe: Renegades episode "Cousins"), (d. 2020).
- August 10: Murray Melvin, English actor (voice of Lucius in Oscar's Orchestra), (d. 2023).
- August 24: W. Morgan Sheppard, English actor (voice of Dum Dum Dugan in Iron Man, Erik Hellstrom in Atlantis: Milo's Return, Lawrence Limburger in Biker Mice from Mars, Santa Claus in the Prep & Landing franchise, Merlin in the Justice League episode "A Knight of Shadows"), (d. 2019).
- August 30: Shichirō Kobayashi, Japanese background artist (Toei Animation, Andersen Monogatari, Jungle Kurobe, Treasure Island, Phoenix 2772, The Fantastic Adventures of Unico, Rainbow Brite, Angel's Egg, The New Adventures of Winnie the Pooh, Simoun), storyboard artist (Urusei Yatsura, Here Is Greenwood, Simoun) and art director (TMS Entertainment, Tomorrow's Joe 2, The Wizard of Oz, Urusei Yatsura, Pierrot, Touch, The Littles, Angel's Egg, Venus Wars, Sohryuden: Legend of the Dragon Kings, Nurse Angel Ririka SOS, OLM, Inc., J.C.Staff, Basara, Otogi Zoshi, Simoun, Tokyo Marble Chocolate, Umi Monogatari), (d. 2022).

=== September ===
- September 10: Yasuo Yamada, Japanese voice actor (voice of the title character in Lupin III), (d. 1995).
- September 13: Fred Wolf, American animator (The Box, The Point!, Free to Be... You and Me, Teenage Mutant Ninja Turtles).
- September 15: Olga Orlova, Russian animator (Soyuzmultfilm, Angelina Ballerina), (d. 2022).
- September 25: Brian Murphy, English actor (voice of Len Pond in Pond Life, Dr. Attticus in Hilltop Hospital), (d. 2025).
- September 27: Roger C. Carmel, American actor (voice of Cyclonus and Unicron in The Transformers, Harry Mudd in the Star Trek: The Animated Series episode "Mudd's Passion", Sultan in the DuckTales episode "Master of the Djinni", continued voice of Sir Tuxford in Adventures of the Gummi Bears, additional voices in The Berenstain Bears and The New Adventures of Jonny Quest), (d. 1986).
- September 28: Len Birman, Canadian-American actor (voice of Rocket Robin Hood in Rocket Robin Hood, Hercules and Hank Pym in The Marvel Super Heroes), (d. 2023).

=== October ===
- October 3: Ken Shiroyama, Japanese voice actor (voice of Ebizō in Naruto Shippuden, Dr. Meisel in Spriggan, Gametsu in UFO Warrior Dai Apolon, Japanese dub voice of Eustace Bagge in Courage the Cowardly Dog, Frenzy, Perceptor, Trailbreaker, Sideswipe in The Transformers), (d. 2025).
- October 10: Ron Feinberg, American voice actor (voice of Headstrong in The Transformers, André the Giant in Hulk Hogan's Rock 'n' Wrestling, Doc Terror in Centurions, Titanus in Teenage Mutant Ninja Turtles, Ming the Merciless in Defenders of the Earth, Vladimir Goudenov Grizzlikof in Darkwing Duck) (d. 2005).

=== November ===
- November 13: Richard Mulligan, American actor (voice of Einstein in Oliver & Company, Old Gramps in The Angry Beavers episode "Fish and Dips", Jimmy Kafka in the Hey Arnold! episode "Old Iron Man"), (d. 2000).
- November 25: Takayo Fischer, American actress (voice of Miss Bisby in Mister T, Lo and Li in Avatar: The Last Airbender, Kairi Tanaga in the Batman Beyond episode "Curse of the Kobra", Chu-Hui in the Teen Titans episode "The Quest", Red Panda in The Wild Thornberrys episode "Happy Campers", Kazuko in the Capitol Critters episode "A Little Romance", additional voices in Battle of the Planets, The Plastic Man Comedy/Adventure Show, Battle of the Planets, Saturday Supercade, Rubik, the Amazing Cube, The Flintstone Kids, and A Pup Named Scooby-Doo).

=== December ===
- December 4: Tommy Morgan, American harmonicist and session musician (Bugs Bunny's 3rd Movie: 1001 Rabbit Tales, Batman: The Animated Series, The Simpsons, Family Guy, Mickey's Once Upon a Christmas, Pixar, Shark Tale, Bambi 2, Barnyard, Open Season, The Fox and the Hound 2), (d. 2022).
- December 5: Little Richard, American rock musician (voiced himself in The Simpsons episode "Special Edna", performed The Magic School Bus theme song), (d. 2020).
- December 13: Tatsuya Nakadai, Japanese actor (voice of the Devil in Belladonna of Sadness, Narrator in Final Yamato, Sumiyaki no Roujini in The Tale of the Princess Kaguya, old Junpei Senō in Giovanni's Island), (d. 2025).
- December 28: Nichelle Nichols, American actress, singer and dancer (voice of Nyota Uhura in Star Trek: The Animated Series, Diane Maza in Gargoyles, Miriam in Spider-Man, Thoth Khepera in the Batman: The Animated Series episode "Avatar", Chief in the Buzz Lightyear of Star Command episode "The Yukari Imprint", herself in the Futurama episodes "Anthology of Interest I" and "Where No Fan Has Gone Before", and The Simpsons episode "Simple Simpson"), (d. 2022).
- December 29: Inga Swenson, American actress (voice of Grandma Helga in Life with Louie), (d. 2023).

=== Specific date unknown ===
- Laurie Hanson, American animation checker (He-Man and the Masters of the Universe, BraveStarr, The Simpsons), (d. 2022).

== Deaths ==
=== May ===
- May 21: Raoul Barré, Canadian animator, cartoonist, and painter (co-founder of the animation studio Barré Studio which pioneered some early animation processes, including mechanical perforation of cels and animating special effects on glass; also worked as a contractor for the William Randolph Hearst-owned animation studio International Film Service, and as a "guest animator" for the film series Felix the Cat by Pat Sullivan Productions), dies at age 58 from cancer.

=== December ===
- December 8: Carl Edouarde, American composer (Steamboat Willie), dies at age 57.
