= Hot Dog (1930 film) =

1930 animated film

Full short

Hot Dog is a 1930 animated short film produced by Max Fleischer and directed by Dave Fleischer. The film, which was originally released by Paramount Pictures on March 29, 1930 (also having been copyrighted the same day). Part of the Talkartoons cartoon series, it is the first cartoon to feature Bimbo, who is sent to court for chasing girls. The title refers to a North American exclamation slang for "An expression of delight". Under United States copyright law, the short entered the US public domain on January 1, 2026.

== Plot ==
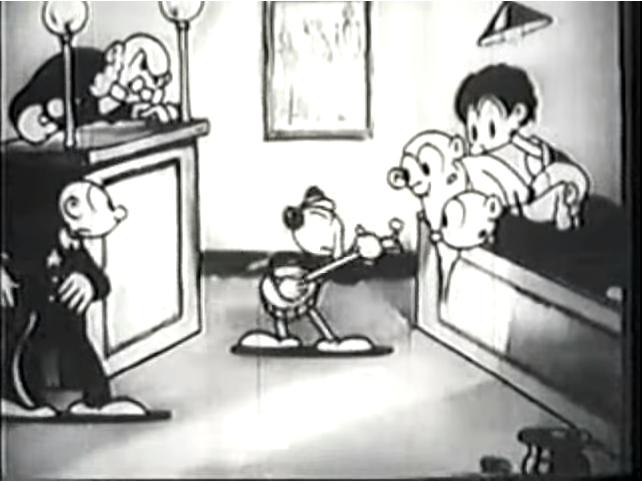
Bimbo playing "St. Louis Blues" on his banjo.

Bimbo tries to charm girls with his car, but the only one who accepts his attentions turns out to be an ugly lion-esque crone. As the car digs a hole in the road in order to escape, a police officer and his horse start to pursue Bimbo. Meanwhile, Bimbo tries to woo another girl, by having the car catch her with the seat. Bimbo's attempts to kiss the girl end up with the flower in her hat turning into a fist that strikes him in the head. And as the girl gets away, her shoes turning into roller skates, while Bimbo is caught by the police when he tries to get the girl back. Bimbo tries to evade the cop, but ends up crossing paths with a marching band that leads him to court. As the trial begins, Bimbo brings out his banjo, and starts to play "St. Louis Blues", and the people in the room (and even a justice painting) end up dancing to the tune while he sings out his testimony, using the judge's beard as a banjo as well. After the song ends, Bimbo bounces on his banjo, using it like a unicycle to leave the court house.

== Production notes ==
This was a landmark film in the history of Fleischer Studios, not only for marking the debut of Bimbo (in his primitive all-white form), but also for being the studio's first production to be done almost entirely on cel animation, replacing the by-now antiquated "slash-and-tear" paper animation process prevalent in New York-produced cartoons during the 1920s. This allowed for the use of a full grayscale, and the simplistic newspaper strip look typical of silent cartoons was eventually supplanted by a saucy and gritty urban feel that would become associated with Fleischer cartoons of the early 1930s. The short was also an early instance of another studio trademark, with humans co-existing with anthropomorphic and almost humanoid animals. Furthermore, the dog-like flapper girl Bimbo harasses midway through the cartoon bears at the very least a passing resemblance to Betty Boop, who would make her debut later in the year with Dizzy Dishes, and would soon become one of the biggest stars of the early years of the Golden Age of American animation. While there are no animation credits, it is speculated that Grim Natwick and Sid Marcus contributed to the film.

Notable is the use of Eddie Peabody's influential 1929 version of "St. Louis Blues" in the last part of the short, whose soundtrack also features "The Fountain in the Park", "Pop Goes the Weasel", "My Sweeter Than Sweet" and "When Johnny Comes Marching Home". Billy Murray did most of the voices (including Bimbo) while the judge was voiced by Walter Van Brunt (also known as Walter Scanlon).

== Reception ==
Hot Dog was well received by Variety on its April 9, 1930 edition. The house review for the Los Angeles Paramount theatre remarked it was "the 'wow' of the bill", headed by the feature Young Eagles. The review for the cartoon itself (shown at the Rialto Theatre in New York City) said that the film was "Quite a laugh", and that the courtroom scene possesses a "real hot quality".
