= Helen Kane =

American singer (1904–1966)

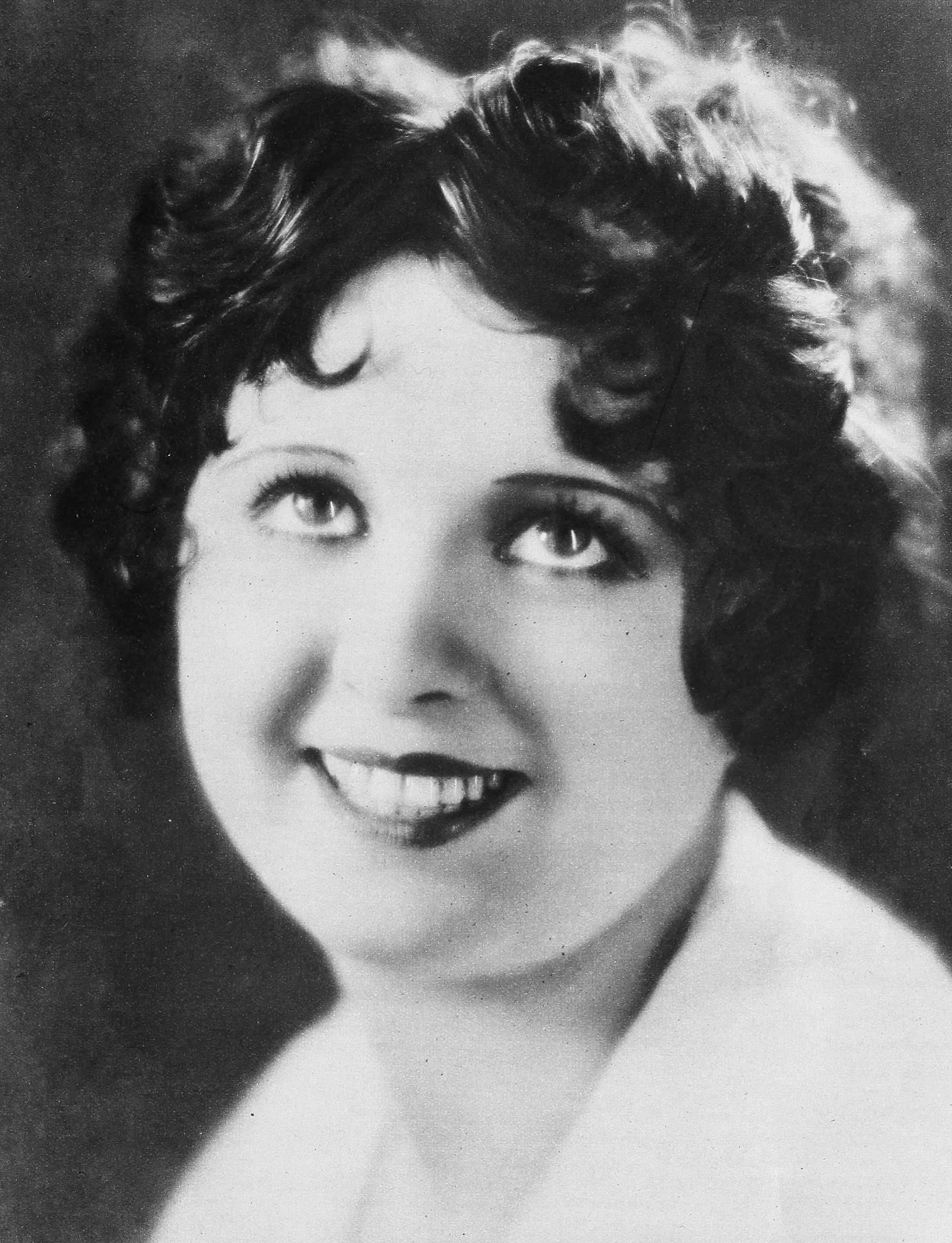
- Kane in 1929
- Born: Helen Clare Schroeder; August 4, 1904; The Bronx, New York City, U.S.
- Died: September 26, 1966 (aged 62); Queens, New York City, U.S.
- Resting place: Long Island National Cemetery
- Occupations: Singer, actress
- Years active: 1919–1950s
- Spouses: Joseph Kane (m. 1924; div. 1928) Max Hoffmann Jr. (m. 1933; div. 1935) Daniel Healy (m. 1939)

Helen Kane (born Helen Clare Schroeder, August 4, 1904 – September 26, 1966) was an American singer and actress. Her signature song was "I Wanna Be Loved by You" (1928), featured in the 1928 stage musical Good Boy. The song was written for Good Boy by the songwriting team Kalmar and Ruby. Kane's voice and appearance were thought to be a source for Fleischer Studios animators when creating Betty Boop. Kane sued the studio for stealing her signature "boop-oop-a-doop" style, but the judge decided that the proof of this was insufficient and dismissed the case.

== Early life ==
Kane attended St. Anselm's Parochial School in The Bronx, New York City. She was the youngest of three children. Her father, Louis Schroeder, a German immigrant, was employed intermittently as a wagon driver; her Irish-immigrant mother, Ellen (born Dixon) Schroeder, worked in a laundry.

Kane's mother reluctantly paid $3 (roughly a day's pay) for her daughter's costume as a queen in Kane's first theatrical role at school. By the time she was 15 years old, Kane was onstage professionally, touring the Orpheum Circuit with the Marx Brothers in On the Balcony.

She spent the early 1920s trouping in vaudeville as a singer and kickline dancer with a theater engagement called the "All Jazz Revue". She played the New York Palace for the first time in 1921. Her Broadway days started there, as well with the Stars of the Future (1922–24, and a brief revival in early 1927). She also sang onstage with an early singing trio, the Hamilton Sisters and Fordyce, later known as the Three X Sisters.

Kane's roommate in the early 1920s was Jessie Fordyce. The singing trio act might have become the Hamilton Sisters and Schroeder, but Pearl Hamilton chose Fordyce to tour as a trio act "just to see what happens" at the end of the theatrical season. She married businessman Joseph Kane in 1924, and despite the brief duration of that marriage (until 1928), she kept Kane as her stage name through two subsequent marriages.

== Music ==
Kane's career break came in 1927, when she appeared in a musical called A Night in Spain. It ran from May 3 through November 12, 1927, for a total of 174 performances, at the 44th Street Theatre in New York City. Subsequently, Paul Ash, a band conductor, put Kane's name forward for a performance at New York's Paramount Theater.

Kane's first performance at the Paramount Theater in Times Square proved to be her career's launching point. She was singing "That's My Weakness Now", when she interpolated the scat lyrics "boop-oop-a-doop". This resonated with the flapper culture, and four days later, Helen Kane's name went up in lights.

In Oscar Hammerstein's 1928 show Good Boy, she first introduced the hit "I Wanna Be Loved by You". Then, it was back to the Palace, as a headliner for $5,000 a week. She rejoined her friends from vaudeville, the Three X Sisters (formerly the Hamilton Sisters and Fordyce) for one night. In a 1935 live stage performance, she harmonized with their unique banter to a novelty tune, "The Preacher and the Bear".

Kane blended several fashionable styles of the late 1920s. These included scat singing, a kind of vocal improvisation, and also blending singing and speech. Sprechgesang ("speech-song") was fashionable at this time in Germany's Weimar Republic in both nightclubs and serious music.

Kane recorded 22 songs between 1928 and 1930. After 1930 and up to 1951, she recorded four sides for Columbia Records in addition to the Three Little Words soundtrack single recording of "I Wanna Be Loved by You". She also recorded four songs that comprise a 1954 MGM 45 EP entitled "The Boop Boop a Doop Girl".

== Films ==
In early 1929, Paramount Pictures signed Kane to make a series of musicals at a salary of as much as $8,000 a week (equivalent to over $120,000 in 2020).

Her films were:

- 1929: Nothing But the Truth, a comedy starring Richard Dix
- 1929: Sweetie, a college musical, which starred Nancy Carroll, Jack Oakie and Stanley Smith
- 1929: Pointed Heels, which starred William Powell and Fay Wray
- 1930: Paramount on Parade, an all-star extravaganza
- 1930: Dangerous Nan McGrew, with Stuart Erwin, Frank Morgan, and Victor Moore
- 1930: Heads Up, starring Buddy Rogers and Victor Moore
- 1931: A Lesson in Love, a musical short film

Although Kane was not the "star" of most of her pictures (with Dangerous Nan McGrew being the one exception), she was so popular that in the case of Sweetie, her name appeared over the title on the marquee when the movie premiered at the New York Paramount (although Nancy Carroll was the true star). Kane provided all the fun, and Jack Oakie and she danced to "The Prep Step", a big hit along with "He's So Unusual". They even performed this dance at the first Hollywood Bowl fundraiser on August 7, 1929. Another hit from this picture was Nancy Carroll's "My Sweeter Than Sweet".

In the opening credits of Pointed Heels, Kane and William Powell are billed on the same line just below the title, with Fay Wray and the rest in smaller letters underneath. She had equal billing with Buddy Rogers in Heads Up!, and their faces appeared in all the ads. In Dangerous Nan McGrew, Kane received top billing in the film's credits.

== Kane v. Fleischer ==
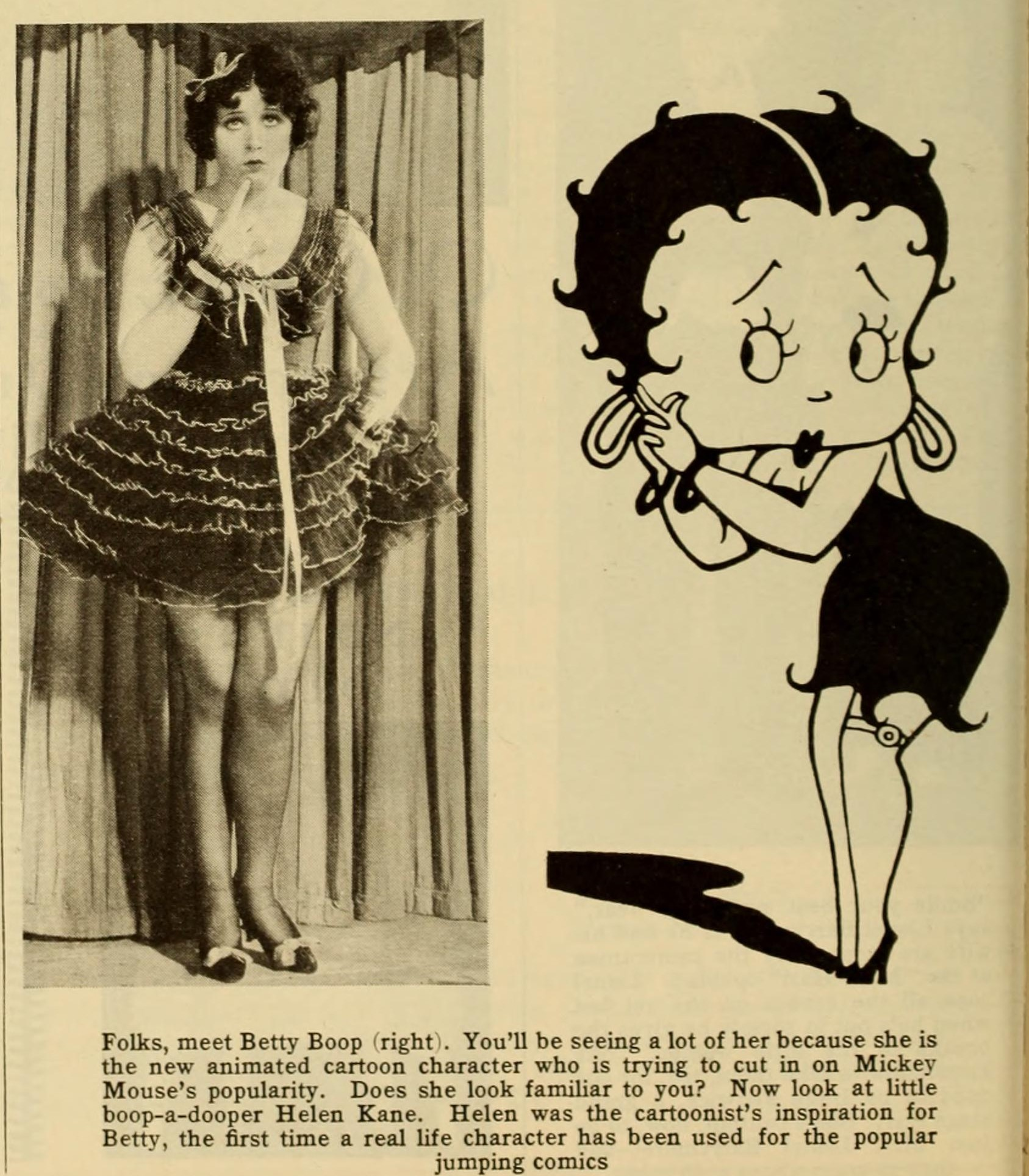
This comparison between Kane and Betty Boop was published in Photoplay's April 1932 issue, one month before the lawsuit was filed.

In 1930, Fleischer Studios animators introduced what was alleged to be a caricature of Helen Kane, with droopy dog ears and a squeaky singing voice, in the Talkartoons cartoon Dizzy Dishes. "Betty Boop", as the character was later dubbed, soon became popular and the star of her own cartoons. In 1932, Betty Boop was changed into a human, the long dog ears becoming hoop earrings.

In May 1932, Kane filed a lawsuit against Max Fleischer and Paramount for damages of $250,000 (equal to $5,899,390 today), alleging infringement, unfair competition and exploitation of her personality and image. Before his death, cartoonist Grim Natwick admitted he had designed a young girl based upon a photo of Kane. Margie Hines, Mae Questel, Bonnie Poe, Little Ann Little, and Kate Wright provided the voice for Betty Boop. They had all taken part in a 1929 Paramount contest, which was a search for Helen Kane impersonators.

The trial took place in April and early May 1934, and lasted about two weeks. In court, Kane was claimed to have based her style in part on Baby Esther, a child African-American dancer and entertainer of the late 1920s, known for impersonating Florence Mills. Variety stated Esther was seven years old, Esther had arrived for the first time in New York City in mid-1928, playing in a pocket-sized nightclub called The Everglades. Theatrical manager Lou Bolton offered testimony during the Kane v. Fleischer trial to convey the impression that Helen Kane adopted Baby Esther's boops to further her own popularity as a singer. Esther's act at The Everglades included an impersonation of the late Florence Mills. Under cross-examination, Bolton said that he had met with Kane at the club after Esther's performance, but could not say when she had walked in. Bolton also stated that Fleischer's lawyers had paid him $200 to come to New York. The Fleischers used as defense a film of Baby Esther, made in 1928, featuring her singing three songs that had earlier been popularized by Helen Kane – "Don't Be Like That", "Is There Anything Wrong with That?", and "Wa-da-da" – which writer Mark Langer says "was hardly proof that Helen Kane derived her singing style from Baby Esther". However Jazz Studies scholar Robert O'Meally's book "Uptown Conversation: The New Jazz Studies" contains a footnote saying "The Fleischer Story" by Leslie Cabarga "makes clear that this evidence might very well have been cooked up the Fleischers to discredit Kane, whom they later admitted to have been their model for Betty Boop." O'Meally also questioned if some sort of deal had been made between Fleischer Studios and Bolton, and questioned if Esther were ever paid for her presumed loss of revenue.

Other attempts to discredit Kane at the trial came in the form of phonograph recordings of Annette Hanshaw, the Duncan Sisters, Al Jolson, Louis Armstrong, and a piece of 1915 sheet music titled "Bou Dou BaDa Bou" (which was actually French, and was not "scat" because it was someone's name). The five women who did the Betty Boop voice in the cartoons also testified, claiming they always "booped" that way, even around the house. Based on the totality of the information presented before him and without a jury, Judge McGoldrick found "insufficient evidence to support the plaintiff's claim" and found in favor of the defendants on May 5, 1934.

== Later years ==
With the hardships of the Great Depression biting, the flamboyant world of the flapper was over, and Kane's style became dated. After 1931, she lost the favor of the moviemakers, who chose other singers for their films. She appeared in a stage production called Shady Lady in 1933, sang weekly on the radio, and made appearances at various nightclubs and theatres during the 1930s.

In 1950, she dubbed Debbie Reynolds, who performed "I Wanna Be Loved by You" in the MGM musical biopic of songwriters Bert Kalmar and Harry Ruby, Three Little Words. She did not appear in the film's credits, but was credited on the soundtrack album and 78 rpm records.

Kane appeared on the CBS television program, I've Got a Secret, on the July 21, 1954, episode. Her secret was, "I was the boop-boop-a-doop girl".

She appeared on several TV shows in the 1950s and 1960s, principally Toast of the Town, later known as The Ed Sullivan Show. Kane's final public appearance was on that show on St. Patrick's Day 1965.

In addition, Kane was given a tribute in 1958 on This Is Your Life with Ralph Edwards. It brought a tearful reunion with her old friend, actress Fifi D'Orsay, and a lifelong fan who once sent her money when she was down on her luck. Renewed interest in Kane brought her a one-record contract with MGM Records and appearances on I've Got a Secret and You Asked for It. She sang on all of these TV shows.

== Death ==
Kane battled breast cancer for more than a decade. She had surgery in 1956 and eventually received 200 radiation treatments as an outpatient at Memorial Hospital. She died on September 26, 1966, at age 62, in her apartment in Jackson Heights, Queens, New York City. Her husband of 27 years, Dan Healy, was at her bedside. She was buried in Long Island National Cemetery, in Suffolk County, New York.

== Discography ==
	Single	Billboard charts	Release date	Remarks
1	"Get Out and Get Under the Moon"	7	July 16, 1928	
2	"That's My Weakness Now"	5	July 16, 1928	
3	"I Wanna Be Loved by You"	2	September 20, 1928	from the musical Good Boy
4	"Is There Anything Wrong in That?"		September 20, 1928	
5	"Don't Be Like That"	16	December 20, 1928	
6	"Me and the Man in the Moon"	8	December 20, 1928	
7	"Button Up Your Overcoat"	3	January 30, 1929	from the musical Follow Thru
8	"I Want to Be Bad"	18	January 30, 1929	from the musical Follow Thru
9	"Do Something"	12	March 15, 1929	from the movie Nothing But the Truth
10	"That's Why I'm Happy"		March 15, 1929	
11	"I'd Do Anything for You"		June 14, 1929	
12	"He's So Unusual"		June 14, 1929	from the movie Sweetie
13	"Ain'tcha?"		October 29, 1929	from the movie Pointed Heels
14	"I Have to Have You"		October 29, 1929	from the movie Pointed Heels
15	"I'd Go Barefoot All Winter Long"		March 18, 1930	
16	"Dangerous Nan McGrew"		April 12, 1930	from the movie Dangerous Nan McGrew
17	"Thank Your Father"		April 12, 1930	from the musical Flying High
18	"I Owe You"		April 12, 1930	from the movie Dangerous Nan McGrew
19	"Readin' Ritin' Rhythm"		July 1, 1930	from the movie Heads Up!
20	"I've Got It (But It Don't Do Me No Good)"		July 1, 1930	from the movie Young Man of Manhattan
21	"My Man Is on the Make"		July 2, 1930	from the movie Heads Up!
22	"If I Knew You Better"		July 2, 1930	from the movie Heads Up!
23	"I Tawt I Taw a Puddy Tat"		between 1950–51	with Jimmy Carroll & His Orchestra
24	"Beanbag Song"		between 1931–51	with Jimmy Carroll & His Orchestra
25	"Hug Me! Kiss Me! Love Me!"		between 1931–51	with George Siravo & His Orchestra
26	"Aba Daba Honeymoon"		between 1931–51	with George Siravo & His Orchestra
27	"When I Get You Alone Tonight"		1954	with Leroy Holmes and his Orchestra
28	"When My Sugar Walks Down The Street"		1954	with Leroy Holmes and his Orchestra

The release dates of recordings 1 to 22 are derived from the cover notes of the CD Helen Kane - Great Original Performances - 1928 to 1930 (RPCD 323).

In 1954, MGM records issued the last Helen Kane recordings as a 45 rpm EP X1164 called "The Boop-Boop-A-Doop Girl!", orchestra directed by Leroy Holmes, and the songs are "When My Sugar Walks Down the Street", "When I Get You Alone Tonight, Do Something" (from Nothing But the Truth) and "That's My Weakness Now".
