= Grim Natwick Film Festival =

- Status: active
- Genre: films
- Frequency: Annually
- Locations: Wisconsin Rapids, Wisconsin
- Country: United States
- Years active: 16
- Inaugurated: 2010

The Grim Natwick Film Festival is an annual film festival, inaugurated in 2010. The three-day festival is held every summer in Wisconsin Rapids, Wisconsin.

The Festival presents animation by Grim Natwick, Betty Boop cartoons animated by Natwick and others, work by the Fleischer Studios and animation by Wisconsin animators across several screening venues. Also featured are academic panels, animator panels and discussion groups. The Festival is held in Wisconsin Rapids as this was the birthplace of animator Grim Natwick, who worked for studios such as Fleischer, Disney, Walter Lantz, Iwerks and UPA from the 1920s to the 1960s. The Festival is part of the annual Betty Boop Festival or Cranberry Blossom Festival. Art and museum exhibitions also featured including lectures from film historian Stephen Worth and contributions from academic Dr Frances Aulds of the University Of Wisconsin Baraboo and relatives of both Grim Natwick and Max Fleischer.

Guests for the 2010 Festival included cartoonist and animator Nina Paley and other animators from Wisconsin.

Guests for the 2011 Festival included Ginny Mahoney, representing Fleischer Studios and granddaughter of Max Fleischer, Betty Boop Collectibles expert Denise Hagopian, and Wisconsin animators Tommy Simms and Hannah Strenger.

Guest for the 2012 Festival held 22 to 24 June included Tim Decker, lecturer in animation from the University of Wisconsin–Milwaukee and former layout artist and animator of The Simpsons, John Roberts, director of Cannes Film Festival shown Mary's Friend and The Wheel, together with returning guests Mahoney, Simms, and Strenger.
