= Mask-A-Raid =

1931 animated short film starring Betty Boop

- Directed by: Dave Fleischer
- Produced by: Max Fleischer
- Starring: Margie Hines; Walter Van Brunt
- Production company: Fleischer Studios
- Distributed by: Paramount Publix Corporation
- Release date: January 7, 1931
- Running time: 7 minutes
- Country: United States
- Language: English

Mask-A-Raid is a 1931 Fleischer Studios Talkartoon animated short film starring Betty Boop. It is the first Betty Boop cartoon to show Betty as a human.

== Synopsis ==
Betty Boop is queen of the Masquerade Ball. She gets annoyed by the king of the ball, who is coming on too strong. Bimbo uses Italian scatting to confuse the king in order to spend time with Betty, but the King catches up on him. Bimbo and the king pull on Betty's arms. Her skirt goes up, showing her underwear and her two garters and a little creature pins the dress closed. Betty wants the two to fight it out, to determine who is worthy of her affections, and pulls out two wooden swords, one big and one small, and tosses a coin to determine who gets which — Bimbo gets the short one. The king and Bimbo fight, Bimbo loses and is taken away by a knight, revealing to be Betty, then says "What would you say if I married you?" with the cartoon ending with Bimbo doing more Italian scatting.
