= Silly Scandals =

1931 film

- Directed by: Dave Fleischer
- Produced by: Max Fleischer
- Starring: Mae Questel; Billy Murray; Gus Wickie
- Music by: Sammy Timberg (uncredited)
- Animation by: Grim Natwick
- Color process: Black-and-white
- Production company: Fleischer Studios
- Distributed by: Paramount Publix Corporation
- Release date: May 23, 1931
- Running time: 6 mins
- Language: English

Silly Scandals is a 1931 Fleischer Studios Talkartoon animated short film starring Bimbo and featuring Betty Boop. This short is the fifth animated short to feature Betty Boop and the first time she is known as Betty after previously being nameless.

== Synopsis ==
Bimbo sneaks into the theater stage show. In a vaudeville act the crowd cheer Betty by name when she comes on stage. Betty Boop, with dog's ears, a white nose, many curls and an enormous head, performs a song called "You're Driving Me Crazy". During Betty's performance her dress falls off, revealing a frilly bra. Bimbo runs afoul of a stage hypnotist.
