= Talkartoons =

Series of animated cartoons

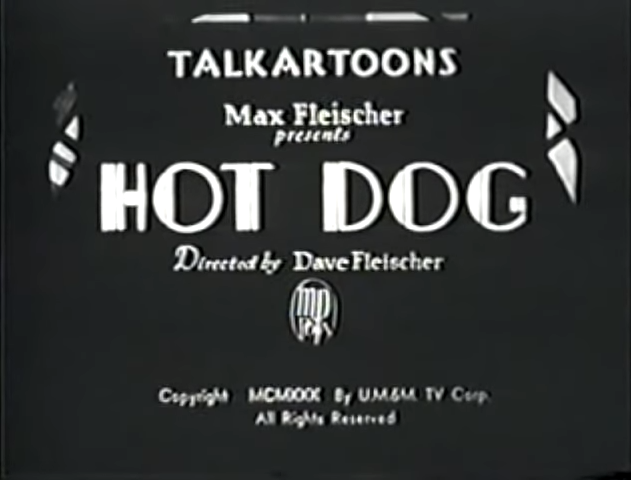
Tittle card for Talkartoon short Hot Dog (1930)

Talkartoons is a series of 42 animated cartoons produced by Fleischer Studios and distributed by Paramount Pictures from 1929 to 1932.

== History ==
For the Fleischer brothers, the transition to sound was relatively easy. With the new contract with Paramount Pictures, and without the burden of Red Seal Pictures and Alfred Weiss, Max Fleischer was free to experiment with new, bold ideas. First he changed the name of the Ko-Ko Song Cartunes series to Screen Songs. Although the Screen Songs were successful, Fleischer felt that it wasn't enough; Walt Disney seemed to gain a great amount of fame through his sound cartoons as well. He decided to work with his brother, Dave on a new series of cartoons where the characters did more than just simply dance to the music of the "bouncing ball". The name for the new series was to be Talkartoons. When the idea was pitched to Paramount, they leaped at the opportunity.

The Talkartoons started out as one-shot cartoons. The first entry in the series was Noah's Lark, released on October 26, 1929. Although a Fleischer cartoon, it appeared to be patterned after the Aesop's Film Fables of Paul Terry. In it, a Farmer Al Falfa-esque Noah allows the animals of his ark to visit Luna Park. When he brings them back into the ship, the weight is so heavy that it sinks. In the end, Noah chases topless mermaids throughout the ocean waters. Lark has very few gray tones, as it was mostly done in the paper-cutout animation process utilized in the Screen Songs produced during the same time and the earlier Fleischer silent works. It also included copyright-free songs, mostly utilized from old 78-rpm's.

The series began to take a new direction, however, with the arrival of Max and Dave's brother, Lou Fleischer, whose skills in music and mathematics made a great impact at the studio. A dog named Bimbo starred in cartoons in the series and became popular due to his nature as an everyman similar to Mickey Mouse. The first cartoon that featured Bimbo was Hot Dog (1930), the first Fleischer cartoon to be almost fully animated on cels, and thus to employ a full range of greys. New animators such as Grim Natwick, Shamus Culhane, and Rudy Zamora began entering the Fleischer Studio, with new ideas that pushed the Talkartoons into a league of their own. Natwick especially had an off-beat style of animating that helped give the shorts more of a surreal quality. Perhaps his greatest contribution to the Talkartoons series and the Fleischer Studio was the creation of Betty Boop with Dizzy Dishes in 1930.

By late 1931, Betty Boop dominated the series. Koko the Clown returned as a third character to Betty and Bimbo, having languished in legal turmoil between the Fleischers and Albert Weiss for years. The series was retired in favor of Betty's own series, where Bimbo and Koko served as secondary characters.

== Filmography ==
Dave Fleischer was the credited director on every cartoon produced by Fleischer Studios. Fleischer's actual duties were those of a film producer and creative supervisor, with the head animators doing much of the work assigned to animation directors in other studios. The head animator is the first animator listed. Credited animators were therefore listed for each short; however, many of the shorts from 1931 to 1932 don't have their animator credits listed, as they were cut when the shorts were sold to U.M. & M. TV Corporation for television broadcasts and had their titles replaced.

=== 1929 ===
No.	Film	Original release date	Animators	Notes	Video if in the public domain
1	Noah's Lark	October 26	Unknown	First Talkartoon.	
=== 1930 ===
No.	Film	Original release date	Animators	Notes	Video if in the public domain
2	Marriage Wows	January 12	Unknown	Lost cartoon.; Working title: Wedding Belles	Lost cartoon.
3	Radio Riot	February 10	Unknown	First appearance of Margie Hines (as well as of a female voice) in a Fleischer cartoon; The bedtime story broadcast at the end was written by Yip Harburg.	
4	Hot Dog	March 29	Unknown	First appearance of Bimbo (as yet unnamed).; First Fleischer cartoon to feature gray tones.; First Fleischer cartoon to be scored by Lou Fleischer.; Utilizes a recording of "Saint Louis Blues" by Eddie Peabody within the soundtrack.	
5	Fire Bugs	May 9	Ted Sears; Grim Natwick	A Bimbo cartoon (though he is still unnamed).; First Fleischer cartoon to credit animators.	
6	Wise Flies	July 14	Willard Bowsky; Ted Sears	Utilizes a recording of "Some of These Days" by Eddie Peabody within the soundtrack.; Uncredited animator: Grim Natwick	
7	Dizzy Dishes	August 9	Grim Natwick; Ted Sears	A Bimbo cartoon. First appearance of Betty Boop (though she and Bimbo are both unnamed).; Bimbo's fur switches from white to black.; First appearance of a new title card design that would remain through the series.; Officially released on Betty Boop: The Essential Collection, Volume 2.	
8	Barnacle Bill	August 25	Rudy Zamora; Seymour Kneitel	A Bimbo and Betty cartoon, featuring them in the (named) roles of Barnacle Bill and Nancy Lee.; Uncredited animator: Grim Natwick	
9	Swing You Sinners!	September 22	Ted Sears Willard Bowsky	A Bimbo cartoon (though he is still unnamed).; Includes caricature of Jewish comedian Max Davidson.; Uncredited animators: Grim Natwick, Jimmie Culhane	
10	Grand Uproar	October 12	Seymour Kneitel; Al Eugster	A Bimbo cartoon (though he is still unnamed).	
11	Sky Scraping	November 1	Ted Sears; Willard Bowsky	A Bimbo cartoon, naming him in the title card; from here onward, he is usually named.	
12	Up to Mars	November 23	Rudy Zamora; Jimmie Culhane	A Bimbo cartoon.	
13	Accordion Joe	December 12	Ted Sears; Grim Natwick	A Bimbo and Betty cartoon (though Betty is still unnamed).; Some sources incorrectly label this as a 1929 release.	
14	Mysterious Mose	December 27	Willard Bowsky; Ted Sears	A Bimbo and Betty cartoon (though Betty is still unnamed).; Uncredited animator: Grim Natwick	
=== 1931 ===
No.	Film	Original release date	Animators	Notes	Video if in the public domain
15	Ace of Spades	January 6	Rudy Zamora; Al Eugster	A Bimbo cartoon.; Television materials exist as with most of the other Talkartoons, but prints are more scarce.	Copyright renewed.
16	Tree Saps	January 19	Grim Natwick; Ted Sears	A Bimbo cartoon.	Copyright renewed.
17	Teacher's Pest	February 7	Grim Natwick; Seymour Kneitel	A Bimbo and Betty cartoon (though Betty, who only appears briefly, is still unnamed).	Copyright renewed.
18	The Cow's Husband	March 14	Jimmie Culhane; R. Eggeman	A Bimbo cartoon.; Bimbo's fur switches back to white.; The bull's dance was rotoscoped.	Copyright renewed.
19	The Bum Bandit	April 6	Willard Bowsky; Al Eugster	A Bimbo and Betty cartoon (though Betty is named "Dangerous Nan McGrew").; Betty is voiced by Harriet Lee instead of Margie Hines.; First time Betty Boop is seen with her slender physique.; Uncredited animator: Grim Natwick	Copyright renewed.
20	The Male Man	April 24	Ted Sears; Seymour Kneitel	A Bimbo cartoon.; Uncredited animator: Grim Natwick	Copyright renewed.
21	Twenty Legs Under the Sea	May 5	Willard Bowsky; Tom Bonfiglio	A Bimbo cartoon.	Copyright renewed.
22	Silly Scandals	May 23	Unknown	A Bimbo and Betty cartoon.; First time Betty is named, though only as "Betty" (no surname given).; First time Betty is voiced by Mae Questel.	Copyright renewed.
23	The Herring Murder Case	June 24	Unknown	A Bimbo cartoon. First time Bimbo is animated in his most familiar design.; First sound cartoon appearance of Koko the Clown.	Copyright renewed.
24	Bimbo's Initiation	July 27	Unknown	A Bimbo and Betty cartoon.; Bimbo is voiced by Claude Reese instead of Billy Murray.; Placed at #37 in the book The 50 Greatest Cartoons.; Officially released on Betty Boop: The Essential Collection, Volume 2.	Copyright renewed.
25	Bimbo's Express	August 22	Unknown	A Bimbo and Betty cartoon (formally billed as such in the titles, still giving Betty no surname).; Bimbo is voiced by Claude Reese.	Copyright renewed.
26	Minding the Baby	September 28	Jimmie Culhane; Bernard Wolf	A Betty and Bimbo cartoon (first time Betty's full name appears in the titles, stylized as "Betty-Boop").	Copyright renewed.
27	In the Shade of the Old Apple Sauce	October 16	Unknown	A Betty and Bimbo cartoon.; Not to be confused with the 1929 similarly-titled Screen Song, In the Shade of the Old Apple Tree.; Lost cartoon.	Lost cartoon.
28	Mask-A-Raid	November 9	Unknown	A Betty and Bimbo cartoon.; Bimbo is voiced by Claude Reese.; The first Talkartoon to put the director and animator credits on a separate title card.; First time Betty is depicted as a human in the Talkartoon series, with her dog ears replaced by hoop earrings.	Copyright renewed.
29	Jack and the Beanstalk	November 22	Roland Crandall Sam Stimson	A Betty and Bimbo cartoon, seemingly held over from earlier production (with both appearing with primitive designs, this being the last time Betty was depicted as a dog)	Copyright renewed.
30	Dizzy Red Riding Hood	December 12	Unknown	A Betty and Bimbo cartoon.; Bimbo is voiced by Claude Reese.	Copyright renewed.
=== 1932 ===
No.	Film	Original release date	Animators	Notes	Video if in the public domain
31	Any Rags?	January 5	Willard Bowsky; Thomas Bonfiglio	A Betty, Bimbo and Koko cartoon.; The surviving master negative has the original opening title card intact.	Copyright renewed.
32	Boop-Oop-a-Doop	January 16	Unknown	A Betty, Bimbo and Koko cartoon.; Betty is voiced by Margie Hines, with Mae Questel providing her singing voice.; First use of the song "Sweet Betty", which would become the theme song for the Betty Boop series.; Officially released on Betty Boop: The Essential Collection, Volume 2.	Copyright renewed.
33	The Robot	February 8	Unknown	A Bimbo cartoon, seemingly held over from earlier production (Bimbo appears in a primitive design; Bimbo's girlfriend is largely a generic one-off, but drawn as Betty in some close-ups that look to have been added later).; There is a possibility this was intended to be an advertising cartoon, since the characters are similar to those on the 1931 Fleischer short Step on It, produced for Texaco)	Copyright renewed.
34	Minnie the Moocher	January 1 (NYC) February 26 (general release)	Willard Bowsky; Ralph Somerville	A Betty and Bimbo cartoon (Koko the Clown appears in a brief cameo).; Betty is voiced by Margie Hines, with Mae Questel providing her singing voice.; Bimbo is voiced by Claude Reese.; Music performed by Cab Calloway and his orchestra. This short contains the earliest known footage of him and his orchestra performing.; The walrus' dancing is rotoscoped from footage of Calloway himself.; Sometimes seen with a refilmed TV title card; transfers with original titles were featured on some on 1980s video compilations.; Named #20 in the book The 50 Greatest Cartoons.; Officially released on Betty Boop: The Essential Collection, Volume 3.	Copyright renewed.
35	Swim or Sink	March 13	Seymour Knitel; Bernard Wolf	A Betty, Bimbo and Koko cartoon.; The original title cards likely animated the short's title; the later, commonly seen TV title card is taken from a single frame of the original, captured at a point where the title reads just "S O S".	Copyright renewed.
36	Crazy Town	March 26	James H. Culhane; David Tendlar	A Betty and Bimbo cartoon.; Betty is voiced by Mae Questel.; Contains special live-action title cards.	Copyright renewed.
37	The Dancing Fool	April 6	Seymour Kneitel; Bernard Wolf	A Betty, Bimbo and Koko cartoon.	Copyright renewed.
38	Chess-Nuts	April 18	James H. Culhane; William Henning	A Betty, Bimbo and Koko cartoon.; Betty is voiced by Mae Questel.; Officially released on Betty Boop: The Essential Collection, Volume 1.	Copyright renewed.
39	A-Hunting We Will Go	May 3	Alfred Eugster; Rudolph Eggeman	A Betty, Bimbo and Koko cartoon.	Copyright renewed.
40	Hide and Seek	May 14	Roland Crandall	A Bimbo cartoon, seemingly held over from earlier production (Bimbo appears in a primitive design; Bimbo's girlfriend is the same featured in The Robot).; There is a possibility that, as in the aforementioned cartoon, this was intended to be an advertising cartoon.	Copyright renewed.
41	Admission Free	June 10	Thomas Johnson; Rudolph Eggeman	A Betty, Bimbo and Koko cartoon.; Betty is voiced by Mae Questel.	Copyright renewed.
42	The Betty Boop Limited	July 18	Willard Bowsky; Thomas Bonfiglio	A Betty, Bimbo and Koko cartoon.; Final Talkartoon.; Officially released on Betty Boop: The Essential Collection, Volume 2.	Copyright renewed.

== See also ==
- Golden age of American animation
