= Jack and the Beanstalk (1931 film) =

1931 film

- Directed by: Dave Fleischer
- Produced by: Max Fleischer
- Starring: Margie Hines; Billy Murray; William Pennell
- Music by: George Steiner
- Production company: Fleischer Studios
- Distributed by: Paramount Publix Corporation
- Release date: November 21, 1931
- Running time: 7 minutes
- Country: United States
- Language: English

Jack and the Beanstalk is a 1931 Fleischer Studios Talkartoon animated short film starring Bimbo and Betty Boop.

== Synopsis ==
Associated with the fairy tale Jack and the Beanstalk, Bimbo plants some magic beans which grow into a gigantic beanstalk. He then climbs to the top of the beanstalk where he finds Betty Boop who is enslaved and forced to cook for the Hungry Giant. Bimbo rescues Betty from the Giant and they both escape on a flying magical hen.

== Cast ==
- Margie Hines as Betty Boop (voice)
- Billy Murray as Bimbo (voice)
- William Pennell as Giant - Cow (voice)
