= Hide and Seek (1932 cartoon) =

1932 Fleischer Studios Talkartoon animated short film

- Directed by: Dave Fleischer
- Produced by: Max Fleischer
- Animation by: Roland Crandall
- Production company: Fleischer Studios
- Distributed by: Paramount Publix Corporation
- Release date: May 14, 1932
- Running time: 6 minutes 10 seconds
- Country: United States
- Language: English

Hide and Seek is a 1932 Fleischer Studios Talkartoon animated short film starring Bimbo.

== Synopsis ==
An unnamed woman (a human "flapper" character, in contrast to the rest of the cast, who are anthropomorphic animals) is making a withdrawal from a bank. She is eyed by the villain, "I. Grabber, Kidnapper" (he has business cards and a storefront sign labeling him). Bimbo is a policeman. The villain seizes the woman and heads off riding on a goat. Bimbo takes chase on a motorcycle. The chase goes up a volcano, which they fall in, descending into "Hell's Kitchen", where the Devil puts the villain and his goat into an oven, and Bimbo and the woman into an icebox. Bimbo and the woman are rescued by Bimbo's anthropomorphic motorcycle. They escape through a tunnel through the center of the Earth, emerging in China, where Bimbo and the woman get married.

== Music ==
Music on the soundtrack includes "Ain't She Sweet", a strain from the William Tell Overture, "How Dry I Am", "I'd Climb the Highest Mountain", "There'll Be a Hot Time in the Old Town Tonight", "I've Got a Feeling I'm Falling", and "Rock-a-bye Baby".
