= Dizzy Red Riding Hood =

1931 film

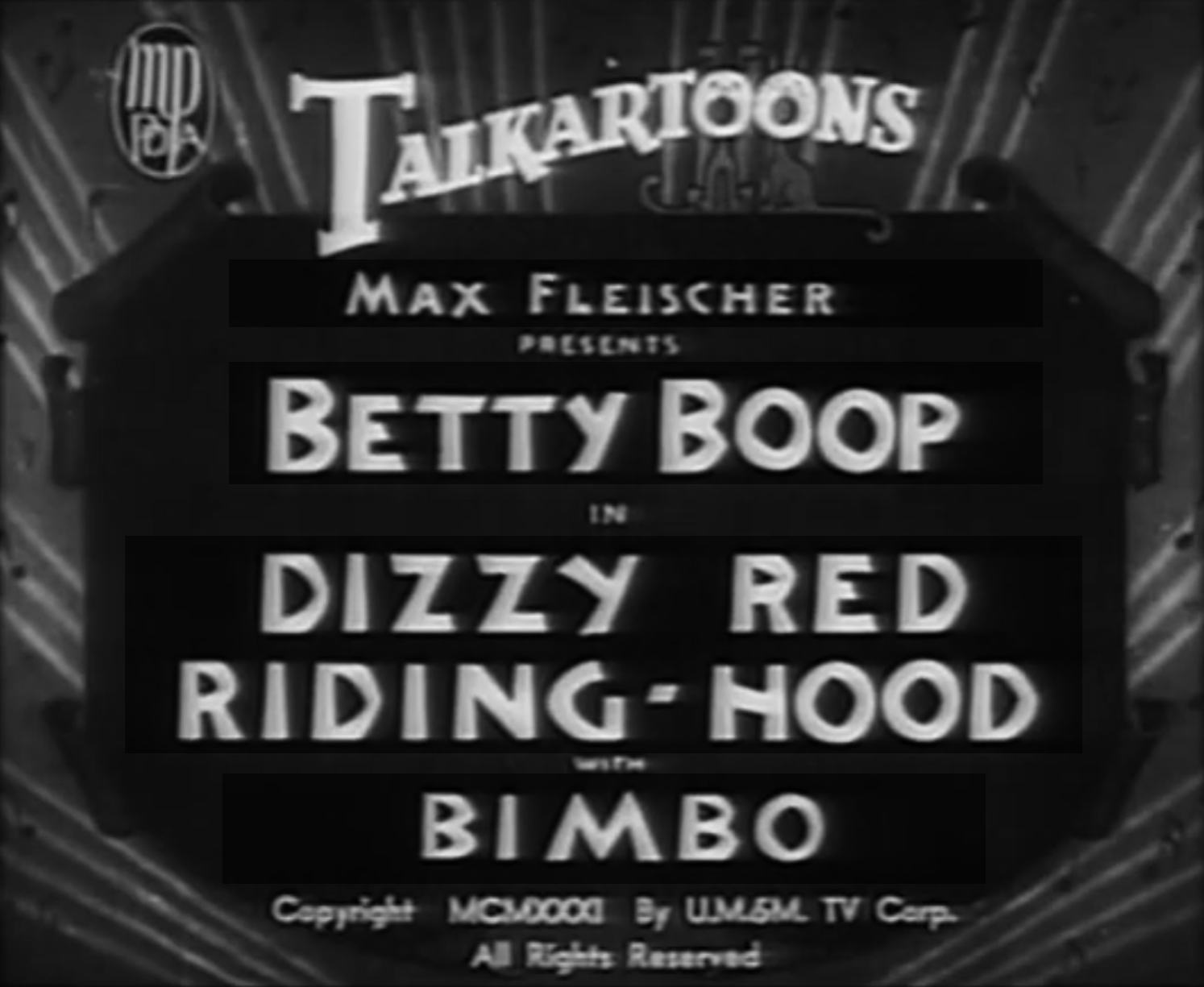
- Directed by: Dave Fleischer
- Produced by: Max Fleischer
- Starring: Margie Hines; Claude Reese
- Production company: Fleischer Studios
- Distributed by: Paramount Publix Corporation
- Release date: December 12, 1931
- Running time: 6 minutes
- Country: United States
- Language: English

Dizzy Red Riding Hood is a 1931 Pre-Code Fleischer Studios Talkartoon animated short film starring Betty Boop.

== Synopsis ==
Betty Boop stars in her own version of Little Red Riding Hood. Betty prepares before going to visit her grandmother's house, despite being warned of wolves wandering the woods by the trees. Betty Boop continues through the woods as Bimbo follows behind. A hungry wolf spots Betty and follows her with a knife and fork. Bimbo sees the wolf who is about to attack Betty and skins him before he can do any harm to her. Bimbo then turns up before Betty at her grandmother's house. Bimbo waits for Betty disguised as the wolf and her grandmother. Betty then turns up inside her grandmother's house and sings "Where'd You Get Those Eyes?" and is then lifted up in the air before Bimbo removes his wolf disguises and reveals himself to her. The story ends with Betty and Bimbo embracing each other on the moon.
