= The Bum Bandit =

1931 film

- Directed by: Dave Fleischer
- Produced by: Max Fleischer
- Starring: Billy Murray (Bimbo); Harriet Lee (Dangerous Nan McGrew)
- Edited by: Fleischer Studios
- Animation by: Willard Bowsky; Al Eugster; Grim Natwick (uncredited)
- Distributed by: Paramount Publix Corporation
- Release date: April 3, 1931
- Running time: 6 minutes
- Country: United States
- Language: English

The Bum Bandit is an animated short film created by the Fleischer Studios in 1931 as part of the Talkartoons series. Betty Boop is voiced by Harriet Lee.

== Plot ==
Bimbo prepares to rob a train that he has forced to stop. He then sings "The Hold up Rag". A ferocious bearded cowboy emerges, eats the barrel of Bimbo's gun, and, pulling off his beard and costume, and reveals himself to in fact be his wife Dangerous Nan McGrew (portrayed by Betty Boop), whom he had abandoned. She drags Bimbo through a pond, then throws him into the locomotive, and disconnects it from the rest of the train. They then drive off, cover the engineer's cabin and send all their wet clothing out on a line to dry, including Betty's panties and socks.

== See also ==
- Dangerous Nan McGrew (1930) feature film
