= The Dancing Fool =

1932 film

- Directed by: Dave Fleischer
- Produced by: Max Fleischer
- Starring: Margie Hines
- Animation by: Bernard Wolf
- Production company: Fleischer Studios
- Distributed by: Paramount Publix Corporation
- Release date: April 8, 1932
- Running time: 7 minutes
- Country: United States
- Language: English

The Dancing Fool is a 1932 Fleischer Studios Talkartoon animated short film starring Betty Boop, Bimbo, and Koko the Clown.

== Synopsis ==
Bimbo and Koko are sign painters hired to paint the lettering on the window of "Betty Boop's Dancing School". Betty Boop teaches her animal friends how to dance to the tune of "Dancing to Save Your Soul". The dancing shakes the building, which crumbles to the ground.
