= Dangerous Nan McGrew =

1930 film

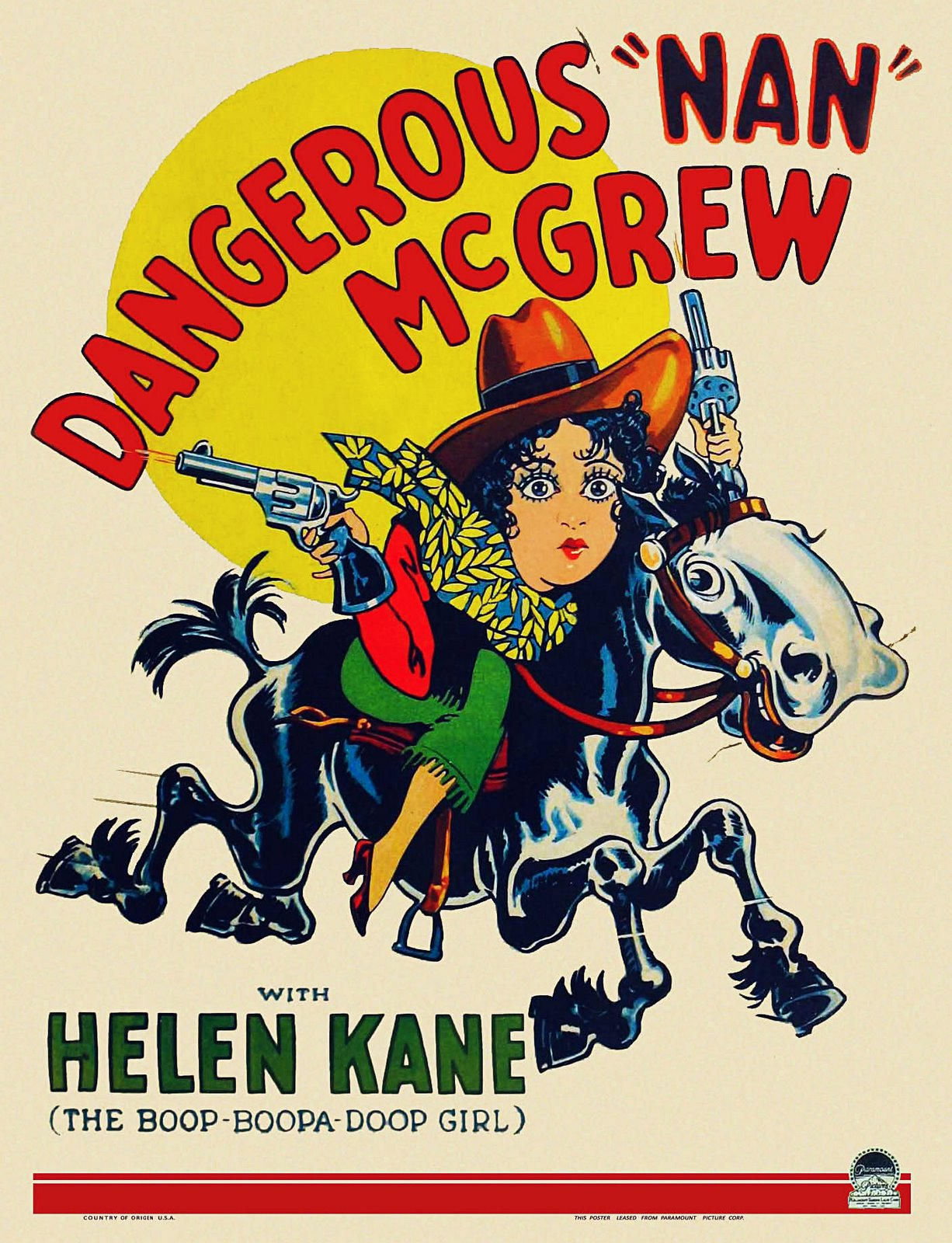
- Theatrical release poster
- Directed by: Malcolm St. Clair
- Written by: Charles Beahan; Garrett Fort
- Produced by: Mack Sennett
- Starring: Helen Kane; Victor Moore; James Hall; Stuart Erwin; Frank Morgan; Roberta Robinson
- Cinematography: George Folsey
- Edited by: Helene Turner
- Music by: Max Bergunker (uncredited)
- Production company: Paramount Pictures
- Distributed by: Paramount Pictures
- Release date: June 22, 1930
- Running time: 73 minutes
- Country: United States
- Language: English

Dangerous Nan McGrew is a 1930 American pre-Code musical comedy film starring Helen Kane, Victor Moore and James Hall and directed by Malcolm St. Clair.

== Plot ==
Dangerous Nan McGrew is the lead entertainer in a traveling medicine show. Muldoon, a member of the medicine show, is a fugitive wanted for murder. The medicine show gets stranded at the snowbound hunting lodge of a wealthy woman. Performing at a Christmas Eve show for the lodge guests, the saxophone-playing nephew of the landlady falls in love with Nan. The Royal Canadian Mounted Police are on the trail of Muldoon, and McGrew, a Sharpshooting singer, assists in the end.

== Cast ==
- Helen Kane as Dangerous Nan McGrew
- Victor Moore as Muldoon
- James Hall as Bob Dawes
- Stuart Erwin as Eustace Macy
- Frank Morgan as Doc Foster
- Roberta Robinson as Clara Benson
- Louise Closser Hale as Mrs. Benson
- Allan Forrest as Godfrey Crofton
- John Hamilton as Grant

== Production and release ==
An early sound film, Dangerous Nan McGrew was made in the aftermath of the financial Panic of 1929 and during the economic crisis that followed. Film historian Ruth Anne Dwyer notes: “Not only was movie making technique modified, but dramatic content, reflecting the hardships of the Depression, changed significantly as well.” Hollywood studio executives sought to capitalize on the public interest in Prohibition and related gangster violence, as well films that offered musical selections. Virtually any genre that included “songs” could be promoted as a “musical.” As such, Paramount studios promoted Dangerous Nan McGrew as “musical-comedy-western-romance.”

After completing the picture, director Malcolm St. Clair was hired by Metro-Goldwyn-Mayer to make another song-laced feature with a western-romantic theme, Montana Moon (1930) starring Joan Crawford. Released in April, the M-G-M production was in theatres two months before the Paramount picture, serving the public appetite for sound films featuring music.

== Reception ==
The New York Times panned Dangerous Nan McGrew, accusing producer Mack Sennett and Paramount of squandering its comedic potential. In spite of casting genuine screen talent, and starring Helen Kane, “Dangerous Nan McGrew isn't funny.” Actor Stuart Erwin is chastened for “grimacing his way” through the part of Eustace Macy, and Helen Kane for “acting in a tediously cute manner.” The scenario is identified as formulaic: “The crooks are captured, the rewards distributed and the marriages consecrated.”

== Retrospective appraisal ==
Biographer Ruth Anne Dwyer observes that director St. Clair skillfully incorporated a number of “signature” shots in which actors repeatedly open and close doors searching for one another. These comic “door” montages serve as an homage to fellow Paramount director Ernst Lubitsch who frequently used this technique to great effect.

St. Clair, a veteran of many silent films, was evidently becoming more comfortable with handling the new sound equipment required for American film productions since 1929. Dwyer notes that Nan McGrew, though having “charming moments,” suffered from poor editing—a symptom of the new film stock that incorporated sound recording into the visual images: “The necessity of having to rely on others to edit was to hound St. Clair for the rest of his career.”

== See also ==
- The Bum Bandit (1931) Fleischer Studios cartoon starring Betty Boop as Nan McGrew
