= Mysterious Mose =

1930 film

- Directed by: Dave Fleischer
- Produced by: Max Fleischer
- Starring: Margie Hines; Billy Murray
- Animation by: Willard Bowsky; Ted Sears
- Production company: Fleischer Studios
- Distributed by: Paramount Publix Corporation
- Release date: December 27, 1930
- Running time: 6 minutes
- Country: United States
- Language: English

Mysterious Mose is a 1930 American animated short film directed by Dave Fleischer, produced by Fleischer Studios and released through Paramount Pictures as part of the Talkartoons series. The film contains an early version of Betty Boop and the studio's star, Bimbo. "Mysterious Mose" is also the name of a popular song from 1930 (which is sung in the short).

Due to being published in 1930, the cartoon entered the public domain on January 1, 2026.

== Synopsis ==
Betty is startled awake in her bed on a stormy night. She searches for the cause of the shock while she sings the song. Then, unexplainable phenomena start happening in the house. Mysterious Mose (Bimbo) appears, and sings part of the song. Bizarre cartoon creatures appear and, at first, sing and enhance Mose's "mysterious" image. Quickly, however, the antics become frightful even to Mose. The film escalates into chaos, which ends when Mose bursts, revealing him having been an automaton (full of cogs and springs) the whole time.

== Popular song ==
"Mysterious Mose" was a song from early 1930, written by Walter Doyle and first recorded by Ted Weems's Orchestra. In addition to its appearance in the short, there have been numerous recordings of the song, including Harry Reser's Radio All Star Novelty Orchestra, Cliff Perrine's Orchestra, Karl Radlach's Orchestra, Rube Bloom's Bayou Boys and R. Crumb & His Cheap Suit Serenaders.

== In popular culture ==
Graveyard Jamboree with Mysterious Mose is a short film made in 1998 by film makers Seamus Walsh and Mark Caballero of Screen Novelties. The film utilizes puppetry, stop motion, and silhouette animation to tell the story of an otherworldly creature preparing a celebration in a cemetery. Walsh and Caballero used the song "Mysterious Mose", recorded in March 1930 by Harry Reser's Radio All Star Novelty Orchestra, with vocals by Dick Robertson.
