= Yip Yip Yippy =

- Directed by: Dave Fleischer
- Produced by: Max Fleischer
- Starring: Carson Robison
- Music by: Sammy Timberg
- Animation by: Roland Crandall; Robert Bemiller
- Color process: Black-and-white
- Production company: Fleischer Studios
- Distributed by: Paramount Pictures
- Release date: August 11, 1939
- Running time: 6 minutes
- Country: United States
- Language: English

Yip Yip Yippy is a 1939 American Fleischer Studios animated short film. The short was the final official Betty Boop cartoon in the Paramount Pictures series. Although this was billed as a Betty Boop cartoon, Betty Boop herself did not appear.

== Premise ==
A drugstore cowboy reads a dime novel and imagines himself as an Old West cowboy battling a cattle rustler.
