= Swim or Sink =

1932 film

- Directed by: Dave Fleischer
- Produced by: Max Fleischer
- Starring: Margie Hines
- Music by: Sammy Timberg
- Animation by: Bernard Wolf; Seymour Kneitel
- Color process: Black-and-white
- Production company: Fleischer Studios
- Distributed by: Paramount Publix Corporation
- Release date: March 11, 1932
- Running time: 7 minutes
- Country: United States
- Language: English

Swim Or Sink is a 1932 Fleischer Studios animated short film directed by Dave Fleischer and starring Betty Boop, Koko the Clown, and Bimbo as part of the Talkartoons series. It was reissued under the titles S.O.S.

== Synopsis ==
As a ship sails in stormy water, it begins to sink and passengers try to leave using whatever method they can. Betty, Bimbo and Koko end up on a raft. After Betty sings a song, they see a ship and think they are going to be saved but it turns out to be a pirate ship. They are captured and the captain eyes up Betty as she tries to cover her legs by pulling down her dress. Koko and Bimbo are put in irons whilst Betty remains on deck. When all the pirates are eventually eaten by a large fish, Betty, Bimbo and Koko remain on board laughing as the cartoon ends.
