= Any Rags? =

1932 film

Any Rags
- Theatrical release poster
- Directed by: Dave Fleischer
- Produced by: Max Fleischer
- Starring: Margie Hines
- Music by: Sammy Timberg; Lou Fleischer
- Animation by: Willard Bowsky; Thomas Goodson (credited as Thomas Bonfiglio)
- Production company: Fleischer Studios
- Distributed by: Paramount Pictures
- Release date: January 2, 1932
- Running time: 6 minutes
- Country: United States
- Language: English

Any Rags is a 1932 Pre-Code Fleischer Studios Talkartoon animated short film starring Bimbo, and Betty Boop, with a brief appearance by Koko the Clown.

It features the song "Any Rags," a 1902 ragtime schottische by Thomas S. Allen.

== Synopsis ==
Bimbo the garbage man walks the streets asking townsfolk "Any Rags?" (during which he strips people's clothes off and takes other things that are not really garbage as trash). He comes across Betty Boop who throws her garbage to him from her window. Bimbo then auctions all the garbage he has collected from his cart to a crowd which includes Koko the Clown, who purchases a bowtie. When Bimbo opens Betty's garbage bag, Betty Boop leaps out and kisses Bimbo. The cart then rolls down the hill and turns into a home for Betty and Bimbo.

== Music ==
In addition to "Any Rags," the soundtrack includes the tunes "The New Call of the Freaks" by Luis Russell, "99 Out of 100 Want to Be Loved" by Al Sherman & Al Lewis, and "Where Oh Where Has My Little Dog Gone?" by Septimus Winner.

== See also ==
- Talkartoon
