= Grim Natwick =

American artist, animator and film director (1890–1990)

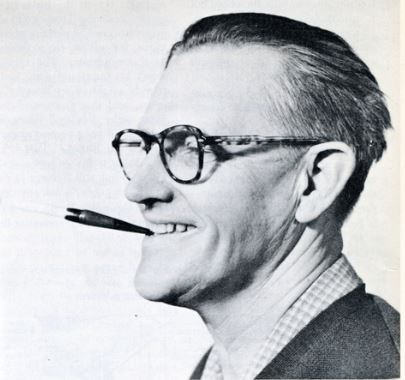
- Natwick in November 1969
- Born: Myron Nordveig; August 16, 1890; Wisconsin Rapids, Wisconsin, U.S.
- Died: October 7, 1990 (aged 100); Los Angeles, California, U.S.
- Education: Academy of Fine Arts Vienna
- Occupations: Artist; animator; film director
- Spouses: Ida Wittenberg (m. 1917; died 1925) Christine Ferris (m. 1929; div. 1934)
- Children: 1
- Relatives: Mildred Natwick (first cousin)
- Awards: Inkpot Award (1978)

Myron "Grim" Natwick (né Nordveig; August 16, 1890 – October 7, 1990) was an American artist, cartoonist, animator, and film director. Natwick is best known for drawing the Fleischer Studios' most popular character, Betty Boop.

== Background ==
Born in Wisconsin Rapids, Wisconsin, Natwick studied at the School of the Art Institute of Chicago and had five brothers and two sisters. Natwick's parents, James and Henrietta (Lyon), owned a furniture store. His grandfather, Ole, was one of the earliest Norwegian immigrants to the United States, arriving in Wisconsin in 1847 (Ole was born on April 8, 1826, to Ole Torkjellson Natvig and Anna at Sagi Natvig, Ardal, Sogn, Norway). He had eleven children in Grand Rapids, Wisconsin (now part of Wisconsin Rapids), including James W., Grim's father, and Joseph, who was the father of Mildred Natwick, Grim's first cousin.

Natwick had his nickname since before high school as a takeoff on his "anything but Grim" personality. He was well known even in high school for his artwork and his poetry. Although never published, many pages of his poetry were displayed in the summer of 2011 at the South Wood County Historical Museum in Wisconsin Rapids, Wisconsin, where there was a permanent exhibit of Natwick's works. His brother Frank was reputedly one of the first Wisconsin athletes to be invited to the Olympics in 1908. He was a high hurdler for the University of Wisconsin–Madison where he was president of his class.

After studying at the Art Institute of Chicago, he went to the National Academy of Design.

== Career ==
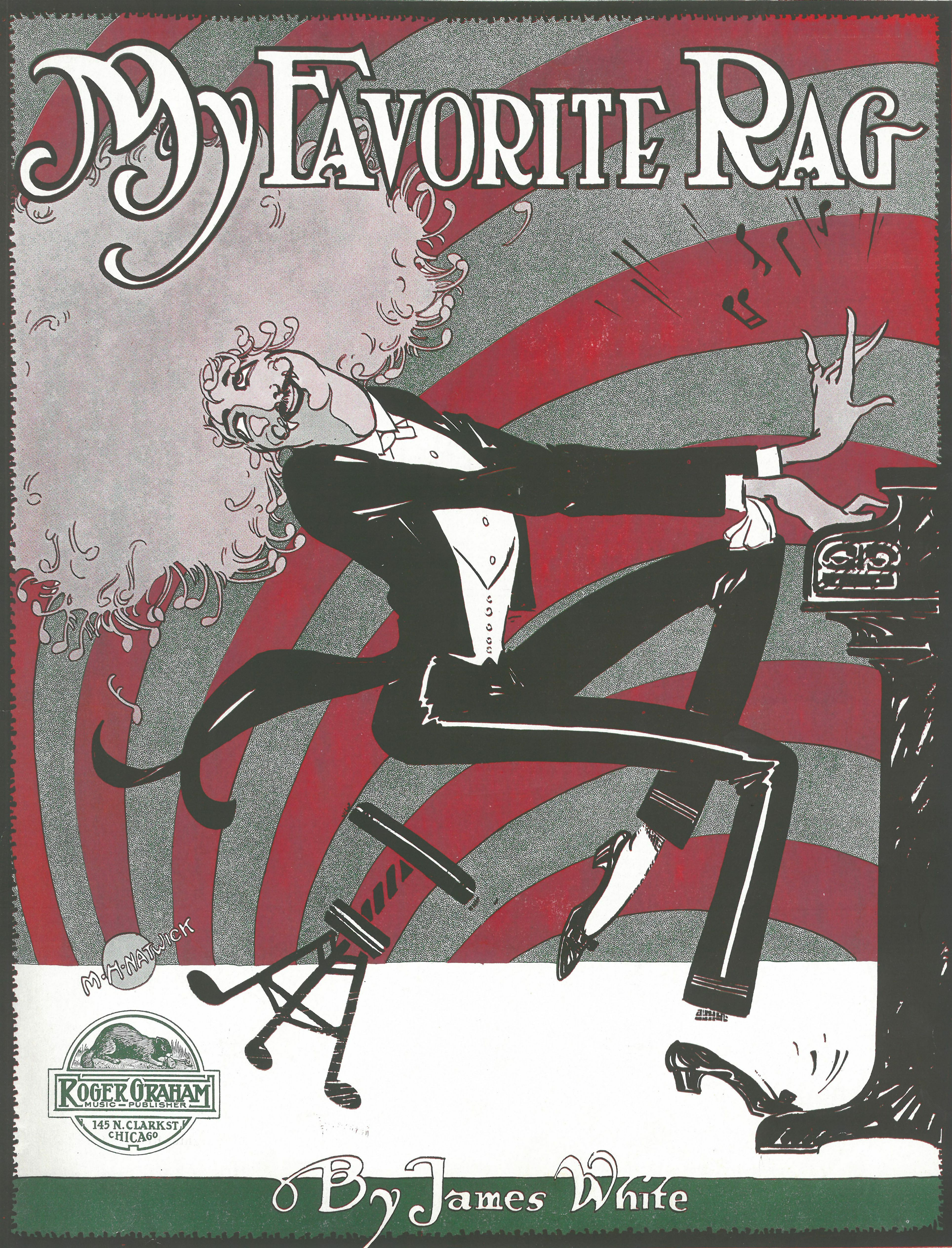
Sheet music cover from 1915, one of Grim Natwick's earliest published efforts

Natwick's artistic career started with cover designs for sheet music, initially for a friend who worked at a music publishing company. Natwick found that he was good at this type of work and contacted other publishers in Chicago, eventually illustrating the covers for many song sheets, usually in no more than two colors. A former school friend, Gregory La Cava convinced him to try animation at International Film Service, which only animated King Features Syndicate's comic strip properties. Natwick stated, "I was having lunch with LaCava one day and he said, 'Why don't you try this thing?' He found it very hard to get artists to do this; nobody knew how to animate. They would come in and see somebody drawing a hundred drawings a day and it would frighten them. We knew each other well, and I had apparently shown a knack of drawing humorous drawings, so he persuaded me to try it for a couple of weeks. That lasted about fifty years." The studio was under the direction of Gregory La Cava. In 1925, after one year at the studio, he took his savings and sailed to the Vienna National Academy, where he mostly drew anatomy of women. Natwick was influenced by Egon Schiele and Gustav Klimt. He graduated in late summer of 1928, moving back to New York. Natwick is best known for creating the Fleischer Studio's most popular character, Betty Boop, under the direction of Max Fleischer. Although legal ownership of the Betty Boop character remained with the studio (as Natwick was an employee), Grim created the original design of Betty Boop at the request of studio head Max Fleischer, who requested a girlfriend for his then-star character, an anthropomorphic dog named "Bimbo". Natwick would remain one the primary animators of Betty Boop from "Dizzy Dishes" (1930) to "Bimbo's Initiation" (1931), his last cartoon for Fleischer's before moving to the West Coast.

Natwick worked for a number of American animation studios, including Ub Iwerks' Animated Pictures Corp., Walt Disney Animation Studios, Walter Lantz Productions, UPA, and the Richard Williams studio. Seeing Natwick's animation of Betty Boop in "The Bum Bandit" promoted Disney to make him an offer, but believing Iwerks to be the real creative force of the two he chose to work at the latter's studio. At Iwerks, Natwick animated a number of Flip the Frog cartoons and designed Willie Whopper. More and more, Iwerks came to rely on Grim Natwick to supervise the actual production of his cartoons. Natwick eventually wound up running the studio day-to-day, while Iwerks worked on mechanical improvements in the studio's basement. At the studio Natwick would work along with many of the same young animators he had supervised at Fleischer. Natwick was eventually offered partnership in the studio but declined in order to work at Disney. Natwick heard about the studio's plans to develop the first fully animated feature-length film and stated, "An opportunity to work on the first animated feature intrigued me. Ted Sears, at that time, headed a Walt Disney story group. He was a good friend of mine. I asked Ted if he would intercede for me, pick a moment when Walt was in a good mood, and suggest that I would like to join the Disney staff. Two weeks later Ted telephoned and said, 'Walt will meet you after work next Monday.'"

On November 12, 1934, Natwick was hired to work at Walt Disney Animation Studio. Natwick's first assignment at the studio would be doing the female lead in The Cookie Carnival. In his scenes Natwick brought an expertise to animating human characters which was lacking in Disney's previous effort The Goddess of Spring. This along with Natwick's work on the blind girl doll in "Broken Toys" reinforced Disney's intention to assign Natwick to the female lead in the upcoming feature.

Natwick became a lead animator on Snow White and the Seven Dwarfs, and was the person chiefly responsible for animating its titular heroine. Natwick was given some of the studio's top assistants to work with including, Marc Davis, Lester Novros and Jack Campbell. Regarding his scenes, Natwick did not rely heavily on rotoscoping, stating "We went way beyond rotoscope," and "I remember one scene I had where there were 101 rotoscoped tracings; that would mean that they traced every second frame on the film. I used drawing one and drawing one hundred and one, and I filled in the rest, because there wasn't enough in it to give us anything to animate." By the end of the picture, he had animated over 120 scenes, with six assistants working under him. Natwick was responsible for animating some of the most iconic scenes in the film, including the sequences where Snow White cleans the house to "Whistle While You Work", the scene where she dances with the dwarfs, and her singing "Someday My Prince Will Come".

While working for the Fleischer studios in 1939, Natwick was in charge of drawing the Prince and the Princess for Gulliver's Travels. He also helped to animate Mickey Mouse in Fantasia, Mr. Magoo, Popeye, Woody Woodpecker, Felix the Cat and many other 1940s and 1950s cartoon greats. Three of Natwick's former assistants included Walter Lantz (Hearst), Chuck Jones (Iwerks) and Marc Davis (Disney).

== Later life and death ==
During the 1980s and 1990s, Natwick served on the advisory board of the National Student Film Institute.

There is evidence Natwick did some commercial work later in his long life. He appears to have contributed to the early images of Sonny & Gramps, mascots of General Mills' Cocoa Puffs, according to then-contemporaries who collaborated with Natwick during his career.

Natwick died on October 7, 1990, in Los Angeles, California, from pneumonia and heart disease, six weeks after turning 100, with a party with friends such as Shamus Culhane.

In 2010, the Wisconsin Historical Society erected a memorial plaque to Grim Natwick in Wisconsin Rapids, Wisconsin. The South Wood County Historical Museum in Wisconsin Rapids, Wisconsin is home to an extensive Grim Natwick exhibit.

Since 2010, the Grim Natwick Film Festival has been held annually over three days in Wisconsin Rapids, Wisconsin, featuring animators from across the state and beyond in panels and screenings of work.

Recently, Natwick's name is an inspiration to a character in the 2017 video game Cuphead, a run-and-gun game that has a style and tone of 1930s cartoons (mostly influenced by Fleischer Studios). His name was adapted to a dragon character named Grim Matchstick, who has a similar stutter and speech to that of Natwick himself.

== Partial filmography (as animator) ==
As animators were often uncredited, many of the films featured below do not credit Natwick as animator. Similarly there may be other films on which he worked which have not yet been attributed to him.

- 1993 The Thief and the Cobbler
- 1977 Raggedy Ann & Andy: A Musical Adventure
- 1963 The Mighty Hercules (TV series) (directing animator - 3 episodes; Double Trouble, Guarding of the Olympic Torch, & Medusa's Sceptre)
- 1960 Felix the Cat (TV series)
- 1959 "Terror Faces Magoo" (short)
- 1954 "Spare the Child" (short)
- 1951 "Georgie and the Dragon" (short)
- 1951 "Rooty Toot Toot" (short)
- 1950 "Bungled Bungalow" (short)
- 1950 "The Popcorn Story" (short)
- 1950 "Trouble Indemnity" (short)
- 1947 "The Bandmaster" (short)
- 1947 "Solid Ivory" (short)
- 1947 "Well Oiled" (short)
- 1947 "The Coo Coo Bird" (short)
- 1947 "Smoked Hams" (short)
- 1946 "The Wacky Weed" (short)
- 1946 "Fair Weather Fiends" (short)
- 1946 "The Reckless Driver" (short)
- 1946 "Bathing Buddies" (short)
- 1946 "Who's Cookin' Who?" (short)
- 1945 "The Dippy Diplomat" (short)
- 1945 "Chew-Chew Baby" (short)
- 1945 "Pied Piper of Basin Street" (short)
- 1945 "Enemy Bacteria" (short)
- 1944 "Ski for Two" (short)
- 1944 "Abou Ben Boogie" (short)
- 1943 "Take Heed Mr. Tojo" (short)
- 1940 "Popeye Presents Eugene, the Jeep" (short)
- 1940 "The Fulla Bluff Man" (short)
- 1939 Gulliver's Travels (animation director)
- 1938 "Mother Goose Goes Hollywood" (short)
- 1937 Snow White and the Seven Dwarfs
- 1936 "Little Boy Blue" (short)
- 1936 "Alpine Climbers" (short)
- 1936 "Dick Whittington's Cat" (short)
- 1936 "Ali Baba" (short)
- 1936 "Mickey's Polo Team" (short)
- 1935 "Broken Toys" (short)
- 1935 "Simple Simon" (short)
- 1935 "The Three Bears" (short)
- 1935 "Mickey's Fire Brigade" (short)
- 1935 "Sinbad the Sailor" (short)
- 1935 "Summertime" (short)
- 1935 "The Cookie Carnival" (short)
- 1935 "Old Mother Hubbard" (short)
- 1934 "The King's Tailor" (short)
- 1934 "Viva Willie" (short)
- 1934 "Aladdin and the Wonderful Lamp" (short)
- 1934 "Jungle Jitters" (short)
- 1934 "Cave Man" (short)
- 1934 "Reducing Creme" (short)
- 1934 "Insultin' the Sultan" (short)
- 1934 "Robin Hood, Jr." (short)
- 1933 "Jack and the Beanstalk" (short)
- 1933 "Soda Squirt" (short)
- 1932 "The Music Lesson"(short)
- 1932 "Phoney Express" (short)
- 1932 "The Goal Rush" (short)
- 1932 "Stormy Seas" (short)
- 1932 "Room Runners" (short)
- 1932 "The Office Boy" (short)
- 1932 "The Milkman" (short)
- 1931 "Africa Squeaks" (short)
- 1931 "Jail Birds" (short)
- 1931 "The New Car" (short)
- 1931 "Bimbo's Initiation" (short)
- 1931 "Silly Scandals" (short)
- 1931 "Ragtime Romeo" (short)
- 1931 "The Male Man" (short)
- 1931 "The Bum Bandit" (short)
- 1931 "Teacher's Pest" (short)
- 1931 "Tree Saps" (short)
- 1931 "Please Go 'Way and Let Me Sleep" (short)
- 1930 "Mysterious Mose" (short)
- 1930 "Accordion Joe" (short)
- 1930 "Mariutch" (short)
- 1930 "Swing You Sinners!" (short)
- 1930 "Barnacle Bill" (short)
- 1930 "Dizzy Dishes" (short)
- 1930 "Wise Flies" (short)
- 1930 "Fire Bugs" (short)
- 1930 "Hot Dog" (short)
- 1922 "A Joy Ride" (short)
- 1920 "Yes Dear" (short)
- 1919 "Breath of a Nation" (short)
