= Chess-Nuts =

1932 film

- Directed by: Dave Fleischer
- Produced by: Max Fleischer
- Starring: Mae Questel
- Music by: Sammy Timberg
- Animation by: James H. Culhane; William Henning
- Color process: Black-and-white
- Production company: Fleischer Studios
- Distributed by: Paramount Publix Corporation
- Release date: April 13, 1932
- Running time: 7 minutes
- Country: United States
- Language: English

Chess-Nuts is a 1932 Fleischer Studios animated short film part of the Talkartoons series starring Betty Boop, and featuring Bimbo and Koko the Clown.

== Synopsis ==
A live action chess game becomes a chaotic, animated quest for the favors of Betty Boop. Betty comes to life as the black queen and Bimbo becomes the white king. The black king, Old King Cole, wants Betty for himself and carries her away to his castle. Bimbo must come to her rescue, with the assistance of Koko and the other chess pieces. When Bimbo breaks into the castle, he engages Old King Cole in a fight, which results in King Cole's death, with Bimbo, Betty, Koko and the other chess characters parading along the chess board. The two men playing chess are shown to have been playing the game for so long that they grow large beards with a spider in a web between the two beards.

The battle contains elements of chess, bowling, football and boxing. Koko appears briefly as part of Bimbo's team of animated chess men.
