= Dizzy Dishes =

1930 film

- The short
- Directed by: Dave Fleischer
- Produced by: Max Fleischer
- Starring: Billy Murray; Margie Hines; Walter Van Brunt
- Animation by: Grim Natwick; Ted Sears
- Production companies: Paramount Pictures; Fleischer Studios
- Distributed by: Paramount Pictures (National Amusements)
- Release date: August 9, 1930
- Running time: 6 minutes
- Country: United States
- Language: English

Dizzy Dishes is an animated cartoon created by Fleischer Studios in 1930, as part of the Talkartoon series. It is noted for being the first cartoon in which Betty Boop appears. Under United States copyright law, the short entered the US public domain on January 1, 2026.

== Plot ==
The cartoon begins with four anthropomorphic flapper cats singing "Crazy Town". Chef Bimbo waits on a hungry gorilla and then goes to the kitchen to prepare the order, roast duck. When he is about to bring it to the gorilla's table, he sees a female French poodle (Betty Boop) performing on stage and falls in love at first sight. He forgets about the hungry gorilla and dances on stage with the duck. The gorilla, furious, goes after Bimbo, who escapes on a wooden train.

== Cast ==
- Billy Murray - Bimbo, Gorilla
- Margie Hines - Flapper cats, Betty Boop
- Walter Van Brunt - Customers

== Notes ==
The as-yet-unevolved Betty Boop is drawn as an anthropomorphic female dog. She is merely a side character; the main plotline revolves around the incompetent chef Bimbo and the irate gorilla. "Crazy Town", sung by the flapper cats in the beginning of the cartoon, is also the theme song for the 1932 film Crazy Town.

== Home video releases ==
In the 1990s, this cartoon was released as part of the Betty Boop - The Definitive Collection laserdisc set. Olive Films (under license from Paramount Home Entertainment) released this cartoon in September 2013 as part of the Betty Boop: The Essential Collection - Volume Two DVD and Blu-ray sets.
