= Three's a Crowd (1932 film) =

1932 film by Rudolf Ising

- Title card
- Directed by: Rudolf Ising
- Produced by: Hugh Harman; Rudolf Ising; Leon Schlesinger
- Starring: Ken Darby; Rudolf Ising; Johnny Murray; The King's Men
- Music by: Frank Marsales
- Animation by: Rollin Hamilton; Larry Martin
- Color process: Black-and-white
- Production companies: Harman-Ising Productions; Leon Schlesinger Productions
- Distributed by: Warner Bros. Pictures; The Vitaphone Corporation
- Release date: December 10, 1932
- Running time: 7 min.
- Country: United States
- Language: English

Three's a Crowd is a 1932 American animated comedy short film directed by Rudolf Ising. It is the eighteenth film in the Merrie Melodies series. The short was released on December 10, 1932.

Three's a Crowd is the first Warner Bros. cartoon to feature the theme of literary characters' coming to life and escaping their books, a common fixture in the Merrie Melodies series; it was famously revisited in 1937 and 1938 by Frank Tashlin in Speaking of the Weather, Have You Got Any Castles, and You're an Education and by Bob Clampett in 1946's Book Revue.

== Plot ==
Full short

An old man reads Alice's Adventures in Wonderland in his study. An alarm goes off at 5 p.m. on his clock, motivating him to leave the study for unspecified reasons. As the candle is blown, Alice emerges from the book and reaches for the radio, which she adjusts to play the titular song. The titular character and Friday from Robinson Crusoe, as well the titular characters from Rip Van Winkle, The Three Musketeers and Henry VIII appear and join in to the music.

From Antony and Cleopatra, Mark Antony introduces Nero playing the fiddle while Rome burns from within the book. Cleopatra also emerges and dances. Alice then opens The Specialist and Uncle Tom's Cabin, summoning Uncle Tom from the latter and giving him the spotlight at a lamp, where he sings and entertains the other characters. From Strange Case of Dr Jekyll and Mr Hyde, Mr Hyde emerges and abducts Alice. Tarzan emerges from Tarzan of the Apes to subdue him alongside the other book characters. Mr Hyde is attacked by a burning smoking pipe, lit matches used as arrows as well as pen points shot from a pencil sharpener. Mr Hyde hides in a casket, which is then disposed of by the rest of the book characters, who celebrate their victory.
