= Crazy Town (film) =

1932 film

- Directed by: Dave Fleischer
- Produced by: Max Fleischer
- Starring: Mae Questel
- Production company: Fleischer Studios
- Distributed by: Paramount Pictures
- Release date: March 25, 1932
- Running time: 7 minutes
- Country: United States
- Language: English

Crazy Town is a 1932 Fleischer Studios Talkartoon animated short film featuring Betty Boop.

== Synopsis ==
Betty and Bimbo take a trip to Crazy Town for a small vacation where anything can happen. They arrive on a train that acts like a horse. Mice are roaring and birds swim in the lake while fish fly in the air. Hats are worn on feet and shoes on heads, while banana peels are eaten instead of the banana.

Fish lure humans into the lake with bait, while women replace their own heads with mannequin heads, as well as cats in a zoo barking with hippos meowing. Betty and Bimbo perform "Let's Go Crazy" for all the animals in Crazy Town on a piano which appears out of nowhere from the ground, and after the performance (where, at one point, Bimbo plays the piano with his rear end), the two kiss.
