= Parade of the Award Nominees =

1932 film by Joe Grant

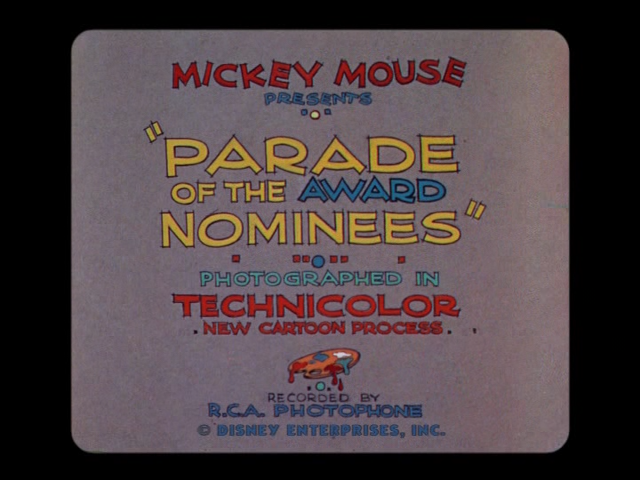
- Title card of the short
- Directed by: Joe Grant
- Produced by: Walt Disney
- Color process: Technicolor
- Production company: Walt Disney Productions
- Distributed by: Academy of Motion Picture Arts and Sciences
- Release date: November 18, 1932 (5th Academy Awards banquet)
- Running time: 2 minutes
- Country: United States
- Language: English

Parade of the Award Nominees is an animated short which was made for the 1932 banquet for the 5th Academy Awards, featuring Mickey Mouse and his friends leading a parade of caricatured Hollywood stars.

The short is the first Mickey Mouse cartoon produced in Technicolor, two years before The Band Concert. United Artists had recently agreed to fund the production of Disney's Silly Symphony shorts in color, and producers Walt Disney and Roy O. Disney hoped that presenting Mickey Mouse in color at this prestigious occasion would help to convince UA to bring color to the Mickey Mouse series as well.

== Plot ==
The first time Mickey appears in color outside of posters

The short features Mickey Mouse leading a parade of caricatured nominees for Best Actor and Best Actress. He is assisted by Minnie Mouse, Clarabelle Cow, and various anthropomorphic animals and insects as musicians and pages. The nominees in order of appearance were:

- Wallace Beery (with Jackie Cooper) for The Champ
- Lynn Fontanne and Alfred Lunt for The Guardsman
- Helen Hayes for The Sin of Madelon Claudet
- Fredric March for Dr. Jekyll and Mr. Hyde
- Marie Dressler for Emma

Pluto rounds up the procession that reads "THE END".

== Production notes ==
Parade of the Award Nominees is the first film in which Mickey appeared in color, and his shorts were green, not yet the iconic red shorts that he would come to wear in the film series, as well as the first Disney short to develop with RCA's Photophone early-in-film sound system. Pluto, presented in color for the first time, is gray rather than yellow-orange. Animator Joe Grant was hired to create the caricatures of the award nominees. It was his first work for Disney and he continued working in their story department for 70 years. The winners who appear in the parade were Hayes, and Beery and March who were joint winners.

The film was only shown at the Awards banquet and never intended for the general public; it was eventually released on both LaserDisc and DVD as part of Mickey Mouse cartoon compilation sets.

== Home media ==
The short was released on December 4, 2001, on Walt Disney Treasures: Mickey Mouse in Living Color.
