= Betty Boop =

Animated cartoon character

- Talkartoons/Betty Boop character
- Betty Boop in 1932
- First appearance: Dizzy Dishes (1930)
- Created by: Max Fleischer; Grim Natwick
- Portrayed by: Jasmine Amy Rogers (2023-2025 on stage and cast album); Aliya Grace (2026-present)
- Voiced by: Margie Hines (1930–1932, 1938–1939); Little Ann Little (1931–1933, 1938); Harriet Lee (1931); Mae Questel (1931–1939, 1988); Bonnie Poe (1933–1934, 1938); Post-Golden Age: Victoria Dorazi (1980); Desiree Goyette (1985); Melissa Fahn (1989); Sandy Fox (1991–2022); Cindy Robinson (2015–2023)

In-universe information
- Species: Human (although an anthropomorphic French poodle in her first appearance)
- Gender: Female
- Family: Pudgy (pet); Buzzy Boop (cousin); Grampy (grandfather)
- Significant other: Bimbo (boyfriend)

Betty Boop is a cartoon character created by Max Fleischer. A precursor to the character, drawn by Grim Natwick, played a small role in the 1930 film Dizzy Dishes. Over time, and thanks to contributions from several Fleischer animators, including Seymour Kneitel, Myron Waldman, Willard Bowsky, and Bernie Wolf, that initial canine-inspired songstress evolved into the character now known as Betty Boop. (Note: Richard Fleischer wrote that "he, Max Fleischer, was the sole creator ... acknowledged that many animators contributed ... not just Natwick, but also Seymour Kneitel, Berny Wolf, Myron Waldman, ...") She originally appeared in the Talkartoons and Betty Boop film series, which were produced by Fleischer Studios and released by Paramount Pictures. She was featured in 90 theatrical cartoons between 1930 and 1939. She has also been featured in comic strips and prolific mass merchandising throughout the decades, and two television specials in the 1980s. In 2025, Boop! The Musical debuted on Broadway.

A caricature of a Jazz Age flapper, Betty Boop was described in a 1934 court case as "combin[ing] in appearance the childish with the sophisticated—a large, round baby face with big eyes and a nose like a button, framed in a somewhat careful coiffure, with a very small body of which perhaps the leading characteristic is the most self-confident little bust imaginable". She was toned down in the mid-1930s to appear more modest as a result of the Hays Code, causing her to be overshadowed in favor of other Fleischer series. Betty Boop is one of the world's best-known and most popular cartoon characters.

== History ==
=== Origins ===
Dizzy Dishes, in which Betty Boop, as a yet-to-be-named poodle, first appears

Betty Boop made her first appearance in the cartoon Dizzy Dishes, released on August 9, 1930, the seventh installment in Fleischer's Talkartoons series. Inspired by a popular performing style, the character was originally created as an anthropomorphic French Poodle. Clara Bow is sometimes given credit as being the inspiration for Boop, though Fleischer told his artists that he wanted a caricature of singer Helen Kane. Kane later sued Fleischer over its impersonation of her image, her distinctive singing style, and her use of the rhythmic nonsense syllables "boop-boop-a-doop." The court ruled in favor of the studio, which argued that the elements of Kane's style of singing—including her infantile "baby voice" and her use of the scat-like phrase "boop-boop-a-doop"—were not her own invention and were common conventions in late 1920s vaudeville vocal performance. Betty Boop appeared as a supporting character in 10 cartoons as a flapper girl with more heart than brains. In individual cartoons, she was called "Nancy Lee" (Barnacle Bill) or "Nan McGrew" (The Bum Bandit)—derived from the Helen Kane film Dangerous Nan McGrew (1930)—usually serving as a girlfriend to studio star Bimbo.

Within a year, Betty made the transition from an incidental human-canine breed to a completely human female character. While much credit has been given to Grim Natwick for helping to transform Max Fleischer's creation, her transition was also in part due to the work of Bernard Wolf, Otto Feuer, Seymour Kneitel, Roland "Doc" Crandall, Willard Bowsky, and James "Shamus" Culhane. By the release of Any Rags, Betty Boop was forever established as a human character. Her floppy poodle ears became hoop earrings, and her black poodle nose became a girl's button-like nose.

Betty was first voiced by Margie Hines. Later, several different voice actresses performed the role, including Kate Wright, Bonnie Poe, Ann Rothschild (also known as Little Ann Little), and especially Mae Questel, who began voicing Betty Boop in Silly Scandals (1931), and continued with the role until 1939, returning nearly 50 years later in Disney's Who Framed Roger Rabbit (1988). Betty has been voiced by Cindy Robinson since 2015.

Since the character was created by an Austrian Jew and eventually voiced by a Jewish actress, Mae Questel, animation fans sometimes try to pinpoint various aspects that hint at Betty's Jewishness. The 1932 Talkartoon Minnie the Moocher featured the only appearance of Betty's parents, a strict immigrant couple, who get upset that Betty does not want to eat the traditional German foods Hasenpfeffer (rabbit stew) and Sauerbraten. Benjamin Ivry of Forward says that any of this evidence is ambiguous, as these are not kosher foods, and the accents of the parents are comical German accents, rather than Jewish.

== Portrayal ==
Accordion Joe, an early Betty Boop cartoon

=== Sex symbol ===
Betty Boop is regarded as one of the first and best-known sex symbols on the animated screen; she is a symbol of the Depression era and a reminder of the more carefree days of Jazz Age flappers. Her popularity was drawn largely from adult audiences, and the cartoons, while seemingly surreal, contained many sexual and psychological elements, particularly in the 1932 Talkartoon Minnie the Moocher (1932), featuring Cab Calloway and his orchestra.

Minnie the Moocher defined Betty's character as a teenager of a modern era, at odds with the Old World ways of her parents. In the cartoon, after a disagreement with her strict parents, Betty runs away from home, accompanied by her boyfriend Bimbo, only to get lost in a haunted cave. A ghostly walrus (rotoscoped from live-action footage of Calloway) sings Calloway's song "Minnie the Moocher", accompanied by several other ghosts and skeletons. This haunting performance sends the frightened Betty and Bimbo back to the safety of home. "Minnie the Moocher" served as a promotion for Calloway's subsequent stage appearances and also established Betty Boop as a cartoon star. The eight Talkartoons that followed all starred Betty, leading her into her own series beginning in 1932. With the release of Stopping the Show (August 1932), the Talkartoons were replaced by the Betty Boop series, which continued for the next seven years.

Betty Boop was unique among female cartoon characters because she represented a sexual woman. Other female cartoon characters of the same period, such as Minnie Mouse, displayed their underwear or bloomers regularly, in the style of childish or comical characters, not a fully defined woman's form. Many other female cartoons were merely clones of their male co-stars, with alterations in costume, the addition of eyelashes, and a female voice. Betty Boop wore short dresses, high heels, and a garter, and her breasts were highlighted with a low, contoured bodice that showed cleavage. In her cartoons, male characters frequently try to sneak a peek at her while she is changing or simply going about her business. In Betty Boop's Bamboo Isle, she does the hula wearing nothing but a lei, strategically placed to cover her breasts, and a grass skirt. This was repeated in her first cameo appearance in Popeye the Sailor (1933). A certain girlish quality was given to the character. She was drawn with a head more similar to a baby's than an adult's in proportion to her body. This suggested the combination of girlishness and maturity that many people saw in the flapper type, which Betty represented.

While the character was kept pure and girl-like onscreen, compromises to her virtue were a challenge. The studio's 1931 Christmas card featured Betty in bed with Santa Claus, winking at the viewer. The Talkartoons The Bum Bandit and Dizzy Red Riding Hood (both 1931) were given distinctly "impure" endings. Officially, Betty is only 16 years old, according to various official ephemera during the 1930s (although in The Bum Bandit, she is portrayed as a married woman with many children and with an adult woman's voice, rather than the standard "boop-boop-a-doop" voice).

Attempts to compromise her virginity were reflected in Chess-Nuts (1932) and most importantly in Boop-Oop-a-Doop (1932). In Chess-Nuts, the Black King goes into the house where Betty is and ties her up. When she rejects him, he pulls her out of the ropes, drags her off to the bedroom, and says, "I will have you". The bed, however, runs away, and Betty calls for help through the window. Bimbo comes to her rescue, and she is saved before anything happens. In Boop-Oop-a-Doop, Betty is a high-wire performer in a circus. The ringmaster lusts for Betty as he watches her from below, singing "Do Something", a song previously performed by Helen Kane. As Betty returns to her tent, the ringmaster follows her inside and sensually massages her legs, surrounds her, and threatens her job if she does not submit. Betty pleads with the ringmaster to cease his advances, as she sings "Don't Take My Boop-Oop-A-Doop Away". Koko the Clown is practicing his juggling outside the tent and overhears the struggle inside. He leaps in to save Betty, struggling with the ringmaster, who loads him into a cannon and fires it. Koko, who remained hiding inside the cannon, knocks the ringmaster out cold with a mallet, while imitating the ringmaster's laugh. Koko then inquires about Betty's welfare, to which she answers in song, "No, he couldn't take my boop-oop-a-doop away". According to Jill Harness of Mental Floss, these portrayals of Boop fighting off sexual harassment on the animated screen made many see her as a feminist icon.

=== Under the Production Code ===
Betty Boop's best appearances are considered to be in her first three years due to her "Jazz Baby" character and innocent sexuality, which was aimed at adults, but the content of her films was affected by the National Legion of Decency and the Production Code of 1934, which imposed guidelines on the motion-picture industry and placed specific restrictions on the content to which films could refer with sexual innuendos. This greatly affected the Betty Boop cartoons.

No longer a carefree flapper from the date the code went into effect on July 1, 1934, Betty became a spinster housewife or a career girl who wore a fuller dress or skirt. Additionally, as time progressed, the curls in her hair gradually decreased in number. She also eventually stopped wearing her gold bracelets and hoop earrings, and she became more mature and wiser in personality, compared to her earlier years. Right from the start, Joseph Breen, the new head film censor, had numerous complaints. Breen ordered the removal of the suggestive introduction that had started the cartoons because Betty Boop's winks and shaking hips were deemed "suggestive of immorality". For a few entries, Betty was given a new human boyfriend named Freddy, who was introduced in She Wronged Him Right (1934). Next, Betty was teamed with a puppy named Pudgy, beginning with Betty Boop's Little Pal (1934). The following year saw the addition of the eccentric inventor Grampy, who debuted in Betty Boop and Grampy (1935).

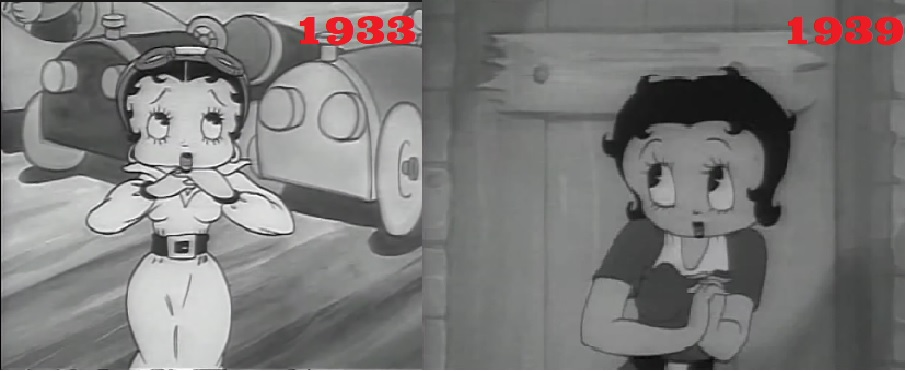
The transformation from pre-Code to post-Code Left: Betty Boop's Ker-Choo Right: Musical Mountaineers

While these cartoons were tame compared to her earlier appearances, their self-conscious wholesomeness was aimed at a more juvenile audience, which contributed to the decline of the series. Much of the decline was due to the lessening of Betty's role in the cartoons in favor of her co-stars, not to mention Fleischer's biggest success, Popeye. This was a similar problem experienced during the same period with Walt Disney's Mickey Mouse, who was becoming eclipsed by the popularity of his co-stars Donald Duck, Goofy, and Pluto.

Since she was largely a musical novelty character, the animators attempted to keep Betty's cartoons interesting by pairing her with popular comic strip characters such as Henry, The Little King, and Little Jimmy, hoping to create an additional spin-off series with her pairing with Popeye in 1933. None of these films, though, generated a new series. When the flapper/jazz era that Betty represented had been replaced by the big bands of the swing era, Fleischer Studios made an attempt to develop a replacement character in this style in the 1938 Betty Boop cartoon Betty Boop and Sally Swing, but it was not a success.

The last Betty Boop cartoons were released in 1939, and a few made attempts to bring Betty into the swing era. In her last appearance, Rhythm on the Reservation (1939), Betty drives an open convertible, labeled "Betty Boop's Swing Band", through a Native American reservation, where she introduces the people to swing music and creates a "Swinging Sioux Band". The Betty Boop cartoon series officially ended with Yip Yip Yippy (1939). While Yip Yip Yippy appears at the end of the Betty Boop series, it is actually a one-shot about a "Drug Store" mail-order cowboy "wannabe" without Betty, which was written mainly to fill the release schedule and fulfill the contract.

== Media ==
=== Television ===
In 1955, Betty's 110 cartoon appearances were sold to television syndicator U.M. & M. TV Corporation, which was acquired by National Telefilm Associates (NTA) in 1956. NTA was reorganized in 1985 as Republic Pictures, which folded in 2012, and became Melange Pictures, a subsidiary of Paramount Global, the parent company of Paramount. Paramount, Boop's original home studio (via Melange/Paramount Global), acts as a theatrical distributor for the Boop cartoons that they originally released. Television rights are handled on Paramount's behalf by Trifecta Entertainment & Media, which in turn were inherited from CBS Television Distribution (renamed CBS Media Ventures in 2021), successor to other related companies, including Worldvision Enterprises, Republic Pictures Television, and NTA Film Network.

Betty Boop appeared in two television specials, The Romance of Betty Boop in 1985, which was produced by Lee Mendelson and Bill Melendez, the same creative team behind the Peanuts specials, and 1989's The Betty Boop Movie Mystery; both specials are available on DVD as part of the Advantage Cartoon Mega Pack. While television revivals were conceived, nothing has materialized from the plans. Her most recent television appearance was an episode of Project Runaway All Stars in February 2018.

By 2016, a new 26-episode television series focusing on Betty Boop was in production by Normaal Animation and Fleischer Studios, with King Features. The show was to be aimed towards the tween and teenaged audiences. The premise was to "recount the daily struggles, joys, and victories of young Betty Boop, who has every intention of being on stage and becoming a superstar".

=== Home media ===
While the animated cartoons featuring Betty Boop have enjoyed renewed attention over the last 30 years, official home video releases had been limited to the VHS and LaserDisc collector's sets in the 1990s. No such releases for the Betty Boop cartoons on DVD and Blu-ray were made until 2013, when Olive Films, under license from Paramount Home Entertainment, finally released the nonpublic-domain cartoons. Although they were restored from the original internegatives, these were altered in 1954 by the now-defunct TV distributor U.M. & M., and the altered opening and closing credits appear on these discs. Volume 1 was released on August 20, 2013, followed by Volume 2 on September 24, 2013, Volume 3 on April 29, 2014, and Volume 4 on September 30, 2014.

In May 2022, animator and archivist Steve Stanchfield released The Other Betty Boop Cartoons, Volume 1 through his label Thunderbean Animation, consisting of the public-domain Betty Boop cartoons not included in the Olive Films sets. It also included the recently discovered 1938 cartoon Honest Love and True.

=== Comics ===
The Betty Boop comic strip by Bud Counihan (assisted by Fleischer staffer Hal Seeger) was distributed by King Features Syndicate from July 23, 1934, to November 28, 1937. From November 19, 1984, to January 31, 1988, a revival strip with Felix the Cat, Betty Boop and Felix, was produced by Mort Walker's sons Brian, Neal, Greg, and Morgan. In 1990, First Comics published Betty Boop's Big Break, a 52-page original graphic novel by Joshua Quagmire, Milton Knight, and Leslie Cabarga. In 2016, Dynamite Entertainment published new Betty Boop comics with 20 pages in the alternative American graphic novel style; four issues were released.

Bud Counihan's Betty Boop (October 23, 1934)

=== Cancelled film projects ===
In 1993, plans were made for an animated feature film of Betty Boop, but they were later cancelled. The musical storyboard scene of the proposed film can be seen online. The finished reel consists of Betty and her estranged father performing a jazz number together called "Where Are You?" Jimmy Rowles and Sue Raney provided the vocals for Betty and Benny Boop.

Producers Steven Paul Leiva and Jerry Rees began production on a new Betty Boop feature film for the Zanuck Company and Metro-Goldwyn-Mayer. The script by Rees detailed Betty's rise in Hollywood in the Golden Age of Hollywood. It was to be a musical with music by jazz musician Bennie Wallace and lyrics by Cheryl Ernst Wells. Wallace and Wells had completed several songs and 75% of the film had been storyboarded when, two weeks before voice recording was to begin with Bernadette Peters (later replaced with Mary Kay Bergman) as Betty, the head of MGM, Alan Ladd Jr., was replaced by Frank Mancuso, and the project was abandoned. On August 14, 2014, Simon Cowell's Syco and Animal Logic announced they were developing a feature-length film based on the character.

=== Video game ===
- Betty Boop's Double Shift (2007) developed and published by DSI Games.

=== Stage musical ===
A musical entitled Boop! The Musical, with music by David Foster, lyrics by Susan Birkenhead and book by Bob Martin, made its pre-Broadway debut at the CIBC Theatre in Chicago, Illinois, from November 19, 2023, to December 24, 2023. Direction and choreography were by Jerry Mitchell, and the musical starred Jasmine Amy Rogers as Betty Boop, with Faith Prince as Valentina, Ainsley Melham as Dwayne, Erich Bergen as Raymond, Stephen DeRosa as Grampy, Angelica Hale as Trisha and Anastacia McCleskey as Carol.

The show began preview performances on Broadway at the Broadhurst Theatre on March 11, 2025, and opened officially on April 5 with the same cast and creative team. Reviews were mixed-to-positive. It was nominated for 11 Drama Desk Awards, the most of any 2025 production, winning 3, and was nominated for three Tony Awards. It closed on July 13, 2025, after 25 previews and 112 regular performances.

=== Film cameo ===
In the 1988 film Who Framed Roger Rabbit, Betty Boop was voiced one more time by Mae Questel before her death in 1998. The character appears in a scene with detective Eddie Valiant. At the end, she appears in the crowd with a group of other cartoon characters who all sing "Smile, Darn Ya, Smile!". She was animated by Roger Chiasson.

=== Live-action horror films ===
- In November 2025, Betty Boop was announced to be receiving an unofficial and unauthorized horror film adaptation called Boop with Devanny Pinn set to portray the character. Production began once Betty Boop entered the public domain in 2026.
- On December 6, 2025, one month before the character went into public domain, Betty Boop was announced to be appearing in the horror sequel, Shiver Me Timbers 2: Chainsaws Are for Children, as a nightclub singer who teams up with Olive Oyl to take down Popeye, who likewise gains an ally in the form of Betty's boss' long-lost son.

=== Live-action new project ===
In May 2026, it was announced that Quinta Brunson and Mark Fleischer would be developing a new Betty Boop live-action movie. Brunson is to star as Betty. In October, Brunson said the film is still in process.

== Marketing and merchandise ==
Marketers rediscovered Betty Boop in the 1980s, and Betty Boop merchandise has far outdistanced her exposure in films, with many not aware of her cinematic origin. Much of this merchandise features the character in her popular, sexier form, and has become popular worldwide once again.

Several life-sized statues of Betty exist; one example was displayed in San Diego's Comic-Con Museum in 2024 and another – sans head – has been in a Norfolk, Virginia, gift shop. The head, valued at $2,000, was stolen in 2005 and never recovered.

In 2010, Betty Boop became the official fantasy cheerleader for the upstart United Football League. She was featured in merchandise targeted towards the league's female demographic.

As of 2021, international licensing company Global Icons has acquired the licensing rights to Betty Boop and other Fleischer Studios characters, thus ending Fleischer's longtime relationship with King Features Syndicate. She still appears in merchandise and social media, appealing to a 21st-century audience, using slang from the social-media website TikTok, and she has various hobbies. (cyclist, recycling, etc.)

Marking Betty Boop's 55th birthday, in 1985, she made her first appearance as a Macy's Thanksgiving Day Parade balloon. The balloon held more than 15,000 cubic feet (420 m^{3}) of helium and was 67 feet (20 m) tall. The balloon did not finish the 1986 parade due to collapsing near Times Square. The balloon appeared again in 1987 then returned for occasional use in the 1990s.

== Legal issues ==
=== Helen Kane lawsuit ===
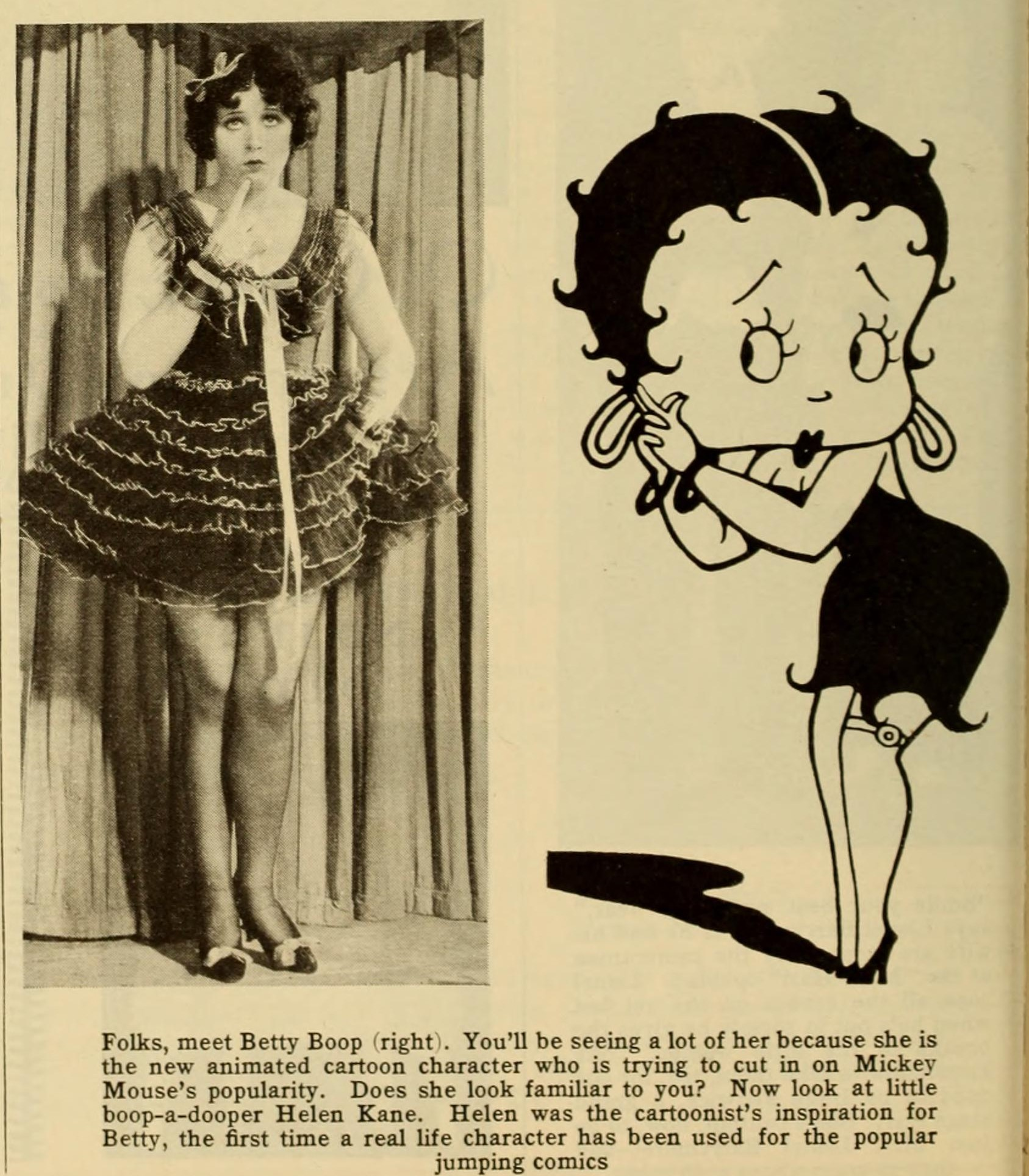
Helen Kane and Betty Boop – Photoplay, April 1932

In May 1932, Helen Kane filed a $250,000 infringement lawsuit against Fleischer Studios, Max Fleischer and Paramount Publix Corporation for the "deliberate caricature" that produced "unfair competition", exploiting her personality and image. While Kane had risen to fame in the late 1920s as "The Boop-Oop-a-Doop Girl", a star of stage, recordings, and films for Paramount, her career was nearing its end by 1931, and Paramount promoted the development of Betty Boop following Kane's decline. The case was brought in New York in 1934. On April 19, Fleischer testified that Betty Boop purely was a product of his imagination and detailed by members of his staff.

Theatrical manager Lou Bolton testified that Kane had witnessed an African-American child performer, Baby Esther (Esther Jones), using a similar vocal style in an act at the Everglades Restaurant club in midtown Manhattan, in "April or May 1928". Under cross-examination Bolton said that he had met with Kane at the club after Esther's performance, but could not say when she had walked in. Bolton also stated that Paramount's lawyers had paid him $200 to come to New York. Esther's name was given in the trial as Esther Jones. (During the trial, Lou Bolton, who was Esther Jones' manager, also testified his belief that she was probably in Paris.) An early test sound-on-disc film (lost after the trial), was produced, which featured Esther performing in this style and introduced as evidence. In the film, Esther sings three songs that had earlier been popularized by Helen Kane – "Don't Be Like That", "Is There Anything Wrong with That?", and "Wa-da-da" – which writer Mark Langer says "was hardly proof that Helen Kane derived her singing style from Baby Esther". Jazz studies scholar Robert O'Meally stated this evidence, though, "might very well have been cooked up by the Fleischers to discredit Kane, whom they later admitted to have been their model for Betty Boop." O'Meally also questioned if some sort of deal existed between Paramount and Bolton, and questioned if Esther were ever paid for her presumed loss of revenue.

New York Supreme Court Justice Edward J. McGoldrick ruled, "The plaintiff has failed to sustain either cause of action by proof of sufficient probative force". In his opinion, based on the totality of the evidence presented in the trial, the "baby" technique of singing did not originate with Kane. No confirmed recordings of Jones are known to exist.

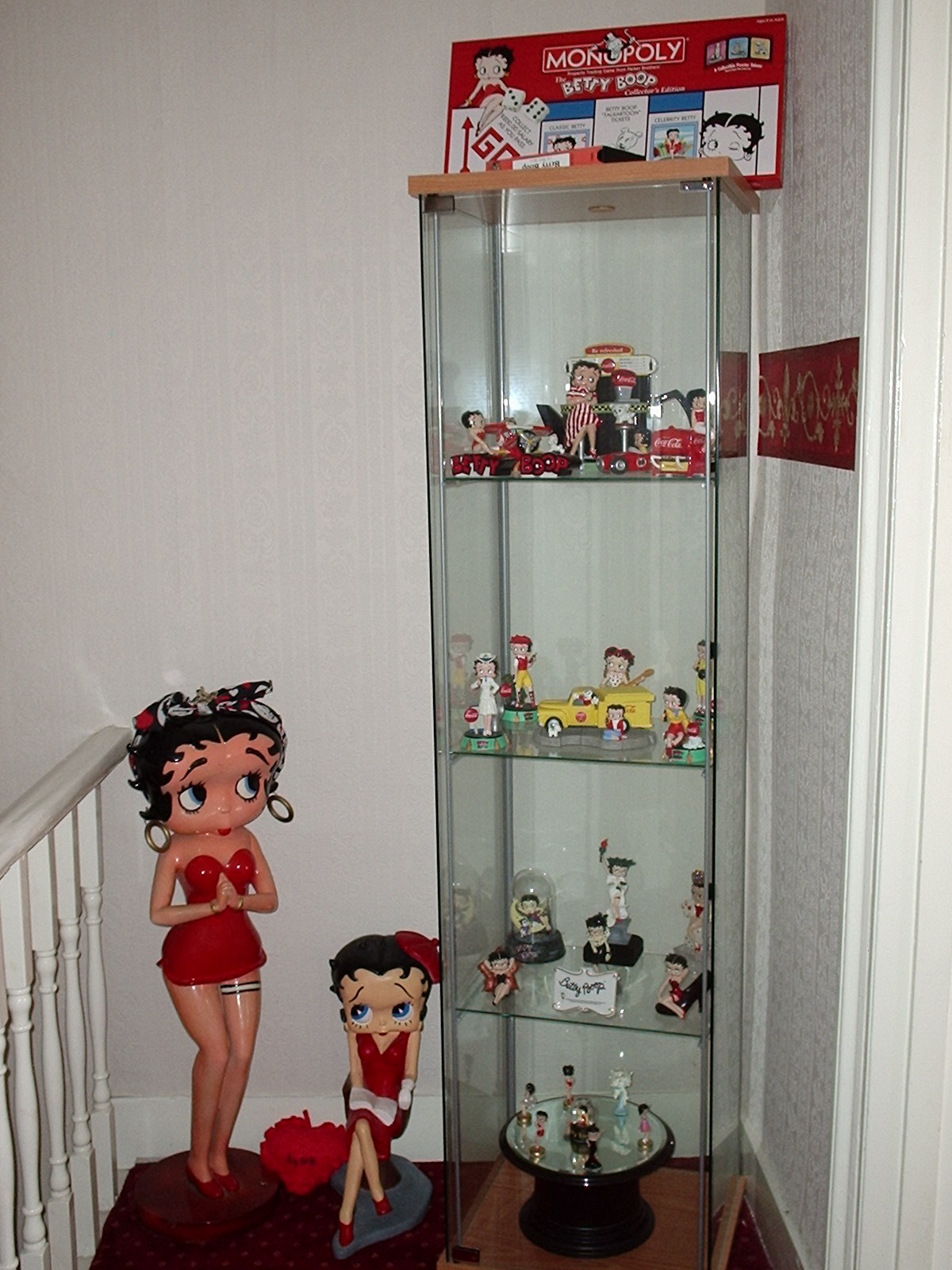
A display of Betty Boop collectibles

=== Lawsuits and recent ownership ===
Ownership of the Boop cartoons has changed hands over the intervening decades due to a series of corporate mergers, acquisitions, and divestitures. In 1954, Paramount Pictures sold the TV rights to UM&M TV Corp, Paramount was selling off all of their library to pay off debts. UM&M TV Corp. went bankrupt before ever distributing the films, they only got as far as modifying the original masters with their TV titles. In 1955 National Telefilm Associates purchased all of the licenses & films owned by UM&M TV Corp. and made 16mm prints to distribute to TV stations. In 1985 NTA changed their name to Republic Pictures since much of their feature film library was old Republic movies. Aaron Spelling Productions absorbed the new Republic Pictures in 1994 and shortly after was acquired by Viacom, which also acquired Paramount Pictures. Then in 2006 Viacom made a corporate split into two separate companies: CBS Corporation and Paramount Pictures (the original distributor). As of 2021, Olive Films (under license from Paramount) holds home video rights and Trifecta retains television rights.

The rights to the "Betty Boop" character were not sold with the cartoons by Paramount, but were transferred to Harvey Comics in 1958 along with the 'Famous Studios' cartoon characters (Casper, Herman & Katnip, Baby Huey, etc.), regardless of whether they had the rights to transfer Betty Boop, according to a 2011 US Court verdict. The courts, however, were unable to come to a majority decision concerning ownership of the copyright. A trademark on the name (but not legitimately the likeness) of Betty Boop is owned by Fleischer Studios, for which the character was created in the 1930s, but which was unable to claim copyright infringement in a 2008 district court case; the merchandising rights to Betty's name were licensed to King Features Syndicate, until 2021 but since then are licensed to Global Icons Inc.

=== Copyright expiration ===
Under US copyright law, the earliest appearances of Betty Boop entered the public domain on January 1, 2026. However, Fleischer Studios still retains trademark rights on Betty Boop's name and image, which unlike copyrights, do not expire unless it ceases to be used by the rights holder. Paramount Pictures still own the copyright to current versions of the character.

== Performers ==
- Margie Hines (1930–1932, 1938–1939)
- Ann Rothschild (1931–1933, 1938)
- Harriet Lee (1931)
- Mae Questel (1931–1938, Who Framed Roger Rabbit)
- Bonnie Poe (1933–1934)
- Victoria D'orazi (1980; Hurray for Betty Boop)
- Desirée Goyette (1984–1988, 1996; Macy's Thanksgiving Day Parade, The Romance of Betty Boop, Animaniacs (as Googi Goop), commercials)
- Melissa Fahn (1989, 2001–2002, 2004–2008; The Betty Boop Movie Mystery, Betty Boop: Big City Adventures, toys, dolls and animated projects)
- Sandy Fox (Since 1991, official voice for King Syndicate worldwide)
- Cindy Robinson (2015–2023, official commercials)

=== Additional actresses ===
- Kate Wright (1933; Betty Boop Theater Production)
- Shirley Reed (1934; The Sun Shine Hour and Arcade Tavern)
- Alice Hamada (1934–1937; records)
- Cookie Bowers (1937–1939; European tour)
- June Albrezzi (1938)
- Peppy Greene (1976, 1997; Vandor Products, The Fleischer Story promotion, Carlton Cards Betty Boop Surprise! Sound Ornament, merchandise)
- Didi Conn (1982; A&W Root Beer commercial)
- Corinne Orr (1984; Betty Boop in Party Time)
- Mary Healey (1988–1989; voice double in Who Framed Roger Rabbit, Hershey's commercials)
- Chika Sakamoto (1988, Who Framed Roger Rabbit, Japanese dub)
- Sue Raney (1993; The Betty Boop Movie)
- Angelica (1993–2003; MGM Grand Las Vegas, MGM Grand Adventures Theme Park, Bally, commercial)
- Daphne de Bruin (1993; Wake Up, Betty Boop!)
- Debbi Fuhrman (1995–1999; television shows, Macy's Thanksgiving Day Parade, Rose Parade, Betty Boop Live!)
- Diana Rice (1996–2000; MGM Grand Las Vegas, MGM Grand Adventures Theme Park)
- Cheryl Chase (2000; Somewhere in Dreamland DVD audio commentary)
- Michelle Goguen (2001; Garnier commercial)
- Lani Minella (2002; Slots from Bally Gaming)
- Nicole Van Giesen (2003; Betty Boop Broadway)
- Shannon Cullem (2004; Boop-Oop-a-Dooin')
- Susan Bennett (briefly)
- Wendy Wynman-Engels (2009; Betty Boop Movie Mix Up)
- LeAnne Broas (2010; Dan-E commercial)
- Vanessa Lauren Gamble (2013; The Ziegfeld Society)
- Lauren Cohn (2013; Betty Boop's Cabaret and miscellaneous projects)
- Heather Halley (2014; Betty Boop Dance Card)
- Camilla Bard (2014; singing voice in Betty Boop Dance Card)
- Sarah Stiles (2016; Fleischerei)
- Kim Exum (2023; Boop! Betty's Day Off)
- Jasmine Amy Rogers (2023; BOOP! The Musical)
- Tristen Buettel (2023; understudy in BOOP! The Musical)
- Gabi Campo (2023; understudy in BOOP! The Musical)
- Makoto Rei (2026; BOOP! The Musical, Japanese version)
- Aliya Grace (2026; BOOP! The Musical)

=== Parodies ===
- Bernadette Peters (1981; Saturday Night Live)
- Alex Borstein (2014; Family Guy)

== Legacy and revivals ==
Betty Boop's popularity has continued into popular culture. In the Green Acres episode "School Days", Oliver quips that Lisa "has a lot of Betty Boop in her". In Drawn Together, Betty is the inspiration for Toot Braunstein. Rapper Betty Boo based her voice and image on Betty Boop. The 1933 Betty Boop cartoon Snow-White (not to be confused with Snow White and the Seven Dwarfs) was selected for preservation by the U.S. Library of Congress in the National Film Registry in 1994. Betty appears in the Ink and Paint club scene in Who Framed Roger Rabbit. Betty is parodied in the Animaniacs episode "Girl with the Googily Goop", with the Boop character called "Googi Goop". The episode, made predominantly in black and white, is also a parody of "Little Red Riding Hood". Googi was voiced by one-time Betty Boop voice actress Desirée Goyette. Beatress Johnson, a character in American Mary, has had extensive plastic surgery to resemble Betty Boop. Betty Boop appeared with model Daria Werbowy in a commercial for Lancôme's Hypnôse Star Mascara, directed by Joann Sfar. In March, 2017, Betty appeared with fashion designer Zac Posen in an animated promotional short produced by King Features Syndicate, Fleischer Studios (its subsidiary) and Pantone.

In April 2011, Funny or Die parodied the character in a trailer spoof for a film called Boop, with Rose McGowan as Betty.

Betty Boop is a central character in the satirical parody webcomic Mr. Boop. The comic centers on the relationship between Betty and a fictionalized version of the webcomic's creator who is married to Betty. The comic was nominated for an Ignatz Award. Betty can be seen at meet-and-greets at the Orlando Universal Studios theme park.

== Accolades ==
- In 2002, Betty was voted in TV Guide's 50 greatest cartoon characters of all time, ranking #17.
- In 2004, Betty Boop was voted among the "100 Greatest Cartoons" in a poll conducted by the British television channel Channel 4, ranking at #96.
- In March 2009, a UK newspaper voted Betty Boop the second sexiest cartoon character of all time, with Jessica Rabbit in first place and the Cadbury's Caramel Bunny in third.
- In August 2010, the inaugural Betty Boop Festival was held in the city of Wisconsin Rapids, Wisconsin, and the third Festival was held in May 2012.
