= Baby Esther =

American jazz musician

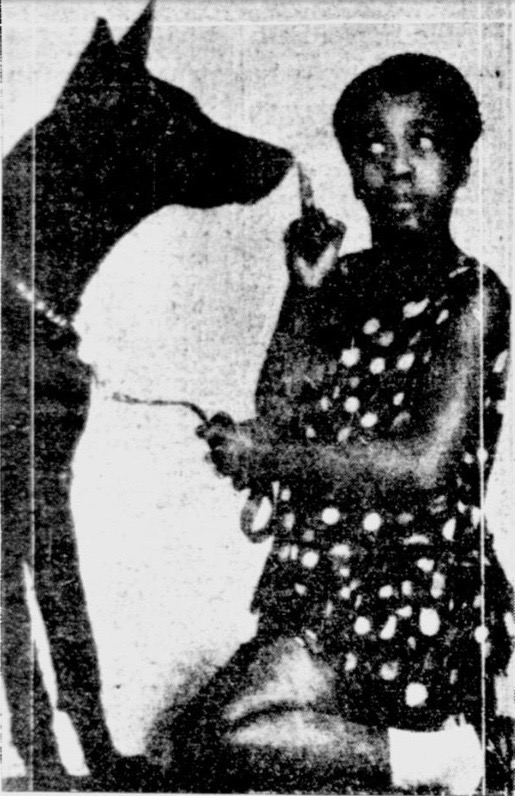
- Li'l Esther, 1930
- Born: Esther Lee Jones c. 1918–1921; Chicago, Illinois, U.S.
- Other names: Li'l Esther, Baby Esther, Little Esther, Young Florence Mills, Second Florence Mills, Miniature Florence Mills
- Occupations: Singer; entertainer
- Years active: c. 1924–1934
- Agent(s): Lou Bolton, Jacques Garnier

Esther Lee Jones (born c. 1918), known by her stage names "Baby Esther", "Little Esther", and other similar variations, was an American singer and child entertainer of the late 1920s, known for interpreting popular songs with a "mixture of seriousness and childish mischief". After gaining attention in her hometown of Chicago, she became an international celebrity before leaving the public spotlight as a teenager.

== Overview ==
Jones was a child entertainer who lived in Chicago, Illinois. She was initially managed by her parents, Gertrude and William Jones. Esther was a trained scat singer, dancer, and acrobat who performed regularly at nightclubs in Harlem and all over the United States in the 1920s. In her act, "Baby Esther" danced, made funny faces, rolled her eyes, and—most famously—interpolated wordless phrases such as "Boo-Boo-Boo", "Wha-Da-Da", and "Doo-Doo-Doo".

By 1924, she was being managed by Lou Bolton. According to Bolton, Esther began using wordless syllables in her singing between 1926 and 1928, when she arrived in New York. That year, Tony Shayne, Jones' New York booking agent, also served as the booking agent for Helen Kane. In the later Kane v. Fleischer court case, Bolton claimed that Kane first saw Esther perform in 1928, at which time the former had a ringside seat with Shayne at the Everglades Club on Broadway. Kane stated under oath that that was not true.

While touring Europe in 1930, Esther had already been honored, along with Josephine Hall, as representatives of both African Americans and the United States of America.

== Career ==
Baby Esther lived in the "colored" neighborhood of Chicago with her mother and father. Esther's career began in the 1920s when she won first prize at a Charleston dancing contest in Chicago at the age of six. Russian-American theatrical manager Lou Bolton saw her performance and took her on, with her first performance purportedly being in a Chicago revue, Opera Versus Charleston. Bolton went on to arrange engagements for Esther in Chicago, New York, Detroit, Toronto, and other cities, after which he brought her to Europe. Jones was rarely called "Baby Esther" while performing, most commonly going by the names "Li'l Esther" and "Little Esther." Originally she was billed as "Farina's Kid Sister," but was later known as the "Miniature Florence Mills", as Esther had started her career impersonating Florence Mills. Mills was noted for her "light, bright" voice and her use of wordless vocalizations, such as "too-ty-tooty-too".

The name "Farina's Kid Sister" derived from Allen "Farina" Hoskins, another African American child star of the period. Apart from his ongoing role in Our Gang comedies, Hoskins was an expert Charleston dancer, performing alongside his sister "Baby Jane." Bolton used Hoskins' fame to promote Esther in the early years of her career; the name formulation of "Little" (or Lil'/Li'l) Esther mimicked Hoskins' "Little Farina," a frequently used nickname. While touring Spain, Esther was referenced as a member of "La Pandilla," the Spanish name for the Our Gang kids (taken from their alternate series name of "Hal Roach's Rascals"); at least once, she was specifically tagged as the performer of Farina, due to her past imitations of him.

=== 1928 ===
Esther performed briefly at a nightclub called the Everglades Club, where she would do imitations of Florence Mills late at night. In June, Esther's father William Jones and manager Lou Bolton were charged for having a minor perform on stage; one write-up of the incident suggested that William Jones was not Esther's birth parent.

In late 1928, Esther was signed for a short Movietone talking film, booked through William Morris for MGM. While the short was later listed variously as being "in production" or "completed", it has not surfaced.

Harrison G. Smith, a business associate of Bolden Smith of New York, furnished Esther with several songs: "The Turtle Walk," "My Little Dixie Home," "I've Got the Blues for Dixieland," and "I Need a Man (Around My House)."

=== 1929 ===
Esther toured Europe in 1929, when her age was variously reported as seven or ten. An article in The Chicago Defender described her as the highest-paid child artist in the world. While touring Europe, she delighted audiences, including royalty. In Spain, she played for King Alfonso and Queen Victoria Eugenie. In Sweden, King Gustave and the Queen came to the theater especially to see her. In France, Germany, and other countries, Esther also gave private performances for the nobility and high society.

Esther's travels around Europe were not entirely without fits and starts. After a dispute, Bolton was fired as the Jones family's manager and returned to the United States. Bolton blamed an Afro-French interpreter, cited in Variety as "Jacques Garnier," for the fracas. At first, Esther's return to the United States was announced. However, Sidney Garner—evidently the same man first cited as "Jacques"—took over as the Jones' manager forthwith, and the family stayed in Europe.

Esther first performed in France at the Moulin Rouge. In Paris, she was known as the "Miniature Josephine Baker." Vu, a leading illustrated weekly, devoted the entire front cover to her picture and a full page in the interior. Jones was described as singing, dancing, doing the splits, and generally carrying on to the great delight of her audiences, dubbed as being "too cute for words".

The London Sunday People, in its review of Paris plays, said of Esther: "Thousands flock no longer to the Moulin Rouge to see Mistinguett herself or the clever American ballet girls, or the beautiful women of the chorus, but to applaud a little mite, 10-year-old, who has won fame and wealth within the space of a few weeks. We are living in an age of speed but this amazing little child has broken every record of sudden theatrical success."

In Stockholm, Sweden, in August, Esther and her manager were famously refused service at restaurant Brända Tomten, whose Swedish owners had spent some years in the United States. Swedish dignitaries and officials around the country spoke up in support of Esther and objected to the restaurant's discrimination, railing against American "Jim Crowism" in Sweden.

=== 1930–1934 ===
Esther continued her success in South America. In Rio de Janeiro, Buenos Aires, São Paulo, and Montevideo, she proved to be a sensation. In Rio de Janeiro, the U.S. Ambassador to Brazil Edwin V. Morgan came to see her play; after her performance, he came backstage to congratulate her. He praised her ability to sing in different languages and invited her to perform for him at the American embassy. Accompanying Esther was Gordon Stretton, who was known as the Prince of Wales' favorite jazz entertainer. Throughout the course of the evening, the president of Brazil expressed to Sidney Garner his great pleasure at seeing such capable Black American artists in Brazil.

Esther was interviewed in Rio de Janeiro by reporters who wanted to know how she had avoided the racists who lynched and burned Black people in Texas and Alabama. Esther replied that she had so far escaped their wrath by staying out of the South.

In 1934, Esther, billed as "The Sepia Dancing Doll", appeared with Helena Justa's Harlem Maniacs revue.

In July 1934, Esther performed in Philadelphia at a midnight benefit performance for the NAACP, along with numerous other African American stars. The Baltimore Afro-American commented that "Little Esther... had a bit too much art and finesse, born of her extensive travel and contacts, not to mention expert tutelage, for her to bring... spontaneous applause... But she had charm and grace—and—and—form! [Her] acrobatic dance number was very good." Esther made another Philadelphia appearance in September at a benefit for the Douglass Hospital, hosted by famed dancer Bill "Bojangles" Robinson. Notably, Robinson also taught Helena Justa and Florence Mills.

Esther has been verified as giving routine performances as late as September 1934, but her later activities are unknown.

Her age is a subject of controversy. In 1934, she may have been 12 or 13 years old, as her age was reported as seven in June 1928 and in March 1929. However, she may have been 15 or 16 years old, as other articles from 1929 describe Esther as 10. An article during the week of August 22, 1931, mentioned that she was 12 years old.

== Kane v. Fleischer ==
Jones is most associated today with her connection with the Kane v. Fleischer lawsuit. In 1930, Fleischer Studios' animator Grim Natwick introduced a caricature of Helen Kane—a singer known since 1923 for her baby voice, for replacing lyrics with noises, and, later, for her signature phrase "boop-oop-a-doop"—in the Talkartoons cartoon Dizzy Dishes. Drawn in the form of an anthropomorphic singing dog with droopy ears and a squeaky singing voice, "Betty Boop", as the character was later dubbed, soon became popular and the star of her own cartoons. In 1932, Betty Boop was changed into a human, the long dog ears becoming hoop earrings.

In May 1932, Kane filed a $250,000 lawsuit against Max Fleischer and Paramount Publix Corporation for "exploiting her image", charging unfair competition and wrongful appropriation in the Betty Boop cartoons. She contended that Betty Boop's "boop-oop-a-doop" style constituted a "deliberate caricature" that gave her "unfair competition". The trial opened in 1934 in the New York State Supreme Court, with Kane and Betty Boop films being viewed only by the judge; no jury was called. Vocal performers Margie Hines, Little Ann Little, Kate Wright, Bonnie Poe, and most notably Mae Questel were all summoned to testify.

Little Ann Little told the court how the "boop-oop-a-doop" phrase had started out as "ba-da inde-do", which developed into "bo do-de-o-do" and finally to "boop-oop-a-doop". Helen Kane's counsel asked Little, the latter of whom spoke throughout the trial in a Betty Boop voice, "Oh, do you speak like that way at home?" Little responded to the court, "Yes, indeedy!"

Testimony was given that Kane adopted her singing style after watching Baby Esther perform in a New York nightclub in April 1928. Esther's first manager, Lou Bolton, testified for the defense, stating that in 1925, he coached a "young negro child" named Esther, teaching her how to interpolate her songs with scat lyrics such as "boo-did-do-doo" and "whad-da-da-da". Bolton testified that Kane had seen Jones' act at the Everglades Restaurant in April or May 1928, which was before Kane opened her own act at the New York Paramount Theatre. Kane had already testified that her first use of the phrase "boop-boop-a-doop" was during her engagement at the Paramount Theatre. Under cross-examination, Bolton said that he had met with Kane at the club after Esther's performance, but could not recall when she had walked in. Kane herself stated that that was not true. Bolton also stated that Fleischer's lawyers had paid him $200 to come to New York. Bolton told the court that he had no idea where Esther was, and he thought that she was "probably" still in Paris. In fact, in May 1934, she was performing in Louisville. Esther herself did not testify at the trial.

Max Fleischer located a sound film made in 1928 of Esther performing, which was introduced as evidence. In the film, she sings three songs that had earlier been popularized by Helen Kane—"Don't Be Like That", "Is There Anything Wrong with That?" and "Wa-da-da"—which writer Mark Langer says "was hardly proof that Helen Kane derived her singing style from Baby Esther". According to jazz historian Robert O'Meally, this evidence might have been fabricated by the Fleischers to discredit Kane, whom they later admitted was their model for Betty Boop. O'Meally also questioned if there was some sort of deal between Fleischer Studios and Bolton and questioned if Esther was ever paid for her presumed loss of revenue.

Judge Edward J. McGoldrick ruled that "the vocables 'boop-boop-a-doop' and similar sounds had been used by other performers prior to the plaintiff," and that "the plaintiff has failed to sustain either cause of action by proof of sufficient probative force." In his opinion, based on the totality of the evidence presented in the trial, the "baby" technique of singing did not originate with Kane.

=== PBS retraction ===
In 2021, a viral 2015 article by PBS used a supposed confirmation of the "Baby Esther was the original Betty Boop" theory that was eventually retracted. PBS added a clarificatory article that admitted the mistake.

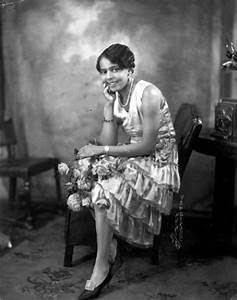
Do Tell by James Van Der Zee, c. 1930. The image has often been misidentified as depicting Esther Jones.

== Misidentifications ==
Baby Esther shares her original name and original stage name with Little Esther Phillips, who was also known as Esther Mae Jones. Both singers used the names "Little Esther" and "Li'l Esther", but Esther Phillips was of a later generation, born in 1935.

Photos of the model Olya Gussy costumed as Betty Boop, taken by Russian-based studio Retro Atelier in 2008, are regularly misidentified as Esther Jones.

An older photo often purported to show Jones went viral when it was distributed by the official Betty Boop Checks website. The image was actually a James Van Der Zee photo of an unidentified woman.
