= List of hospitals in Manhattan =

This is a list of hospitals in Manhattan, New York City, sorted by hospital name, with addresses and a brief description of their formation and development. Hospital names were obtained from these sources. A list of hospitals in New York State is also available.

== Hospitals ==
=== A-L ===
- Bellevue Hospital Center, First Avenue and East 26th Street, Manhattan. The oldest public hospital in the United States, founded as City Hospital on the future site of City Hall and opened on March 31, 1736. Moved to its current site and was named Bellevue for the name of the location in 1794.
- Henry J. Carter Specialty Hospital and Nursing Facility, 1752 Park Avenue, Manhattan. Opened in 2013 on the former site of North General Hospital.
- Coler-Goldwater Specialty Hospital, 900 Main Street, Welfare Island (now Roosevelt Island), Manhattan. The Welfare Hospital for Chronic Disease opened on July 6, 1939 and was renamed Goldwater Memorial Hospital in 1942 for Sigismund Schulz Goldwater, a former New York City and Health Commissioner and Hospitals Commissioner who died that year. Bird S. Coler Hospital opened on July 15, 1952 and occupied most of the north tip of the island. The two hospitals merged in 1996, and is located on the Coler site. The Goldwater portion was closed in 2013 and is being converted to a high-technology center.
- Gracie Square Hospital, 420 East 76th Street, Manhattan, a psychiatric facility. Opened on March 22, 1959, it is now a division of New York - Presbyterian.
- Harlem Hospital Center, 506 Lenox Avenue, Manhattan. Opened as Harlem Hospital on April 18, 1887 at East 120th Street and the East River, moved to Lenox Avenue on April 13, 1907, renamed Harlem Hospital Center.
- Hospital for Special Surgery, 535 East 70th Street, Manhattan. Opened in the residence of James A. Knight, its founder, as the Hospital for the Relief of the Ruptured and Crippled at 97 2nd Avenue on May 1, 1863. Moved to Lexington Avenue and 42nd Street on November 10 or 11, 1870, moved to 321 East 42nd Street in 1912, renamed Hospital for Special Surgery in 1940, moved to its present site in 1955.
- Lenox Hill Hospital, 100 East 77th Street, Manhattan. Incorporated at the German Hospital and Dispensary in the City of New York on April 13, 1861, opened on September 13, 1869, renamed Lenox Hill Hospital in 1918. The dispensary unit was located at 8 East 3rd Street Currently part of Northwell Health.

=== M ===
- Manhattan Eye, Ear and Throat Hospital, 210 East 64th Street, Manhattan. Specialized hospital, incorporated May 5, 1869.
- Manhattan Psychiatric Center, 600 East 125th Street, Ward's Island, Manhattan. Opened as The New York City Asylum for the Insane in July 1868, renamed Manhattan State Hospital on February 28, 1896, renamed Manhattan Psychiatric Center and split into Dunlap, Kirby, and Meyer divisions in the 1970s.
- Margaret Cochran Corbin Veterans Administration Hospital (VA New York Harbor Healthcare System), 423 East 23rd Street, Manhattan. Opened in 1954, renamed in 2021.
- Memorial Sloan Kettering Cancer Center, 1275 York Avenue, Manhattan. Founded as New York Cancer Hospital at 455 Central Park West in 1884, renamed General Memorial Hospital for the Treatment of Cancer and Allied Diseases in 1899, renamed Memorial Hospital for the Treatment of Cancer and Allied Diseases in 1916, moved to its present location in 1939, renamed Memorial Sloan Kettering Cancer Center in 1960. It has an academic partnership with Cornell Medical School, known as the Weill Cornell Graduate School of Medical Sciences. Took over running James Ewing Hospital in 1968.
- Metropolitan Hospital Center, 1901 1st Avenue, Manhattan. Founded as the Homeopathic Hospital affiliated with the New York Homeopathic Medical College (now New York Medical College) in 1875, in a building originally built for the Inebriate Asylum on Ward's Island. Later known as Ward's Island Hospital. Moved to the site of the former New York City Asylum for the Insane on Blackwell's Island (later known as Welfare Island and currently Roosevelt Island) in 1894, renamed Metropolitan Hospital, moved to its current location in 1955, renamed Metropolitan Hospital Center in 1965.
- Mount Sinai Hospital, 1 Gustave L. Levy Place, Manhattan. Incorporated on January 5, 1852, opened on West 28th Street and 8th Avenue as The Jews' Hospital on May 17, 1855, renamed Mount Sinai Hospital in 1866, moved to Lexington Avenue between East 65th and East 66th Streets in 1870, and moved in 1904 to Fifth Avenue and 100th Street, a portion of which was renamed Gustave L. Levy Place in 1977.
- Mount Sinai Morningside, 1111 Amsterdam Avenue, Manhattan. Incorporated on May 12, 1848, opened as St. Luke's Episcopal Hospital in 1856 and originally housed in the Church of the Holy Communion at Sixth Avenue and 20th Street in Manhattan, moved to Fifth Avenue between 54th and 55th Streets on May 13, 1858, moved to its current location in 1896, merged with Roosevelt Hospital to form St. Luke's–Roosevelt Hospital in 1979, acquired by Mount Sinai Hospital in 2013 and renamed Mount Sinai St. Luke's on January 22, 2014.
- Mount Sinai West, 1000 10th Avenue, Manhattan. Incorporated as Roosevelt Hospital on February 2, 1864, via a bequest of James H. Roosevelt, opened on November 2, 1871, merged with St. Luke's Episcopal Hospital to form St. Luke's-Roosevelt Hospital in 1979, acquired by Mount Sinai Hospital in 2013, renamed Mount Sinai Roosevelt on January 22, 2014, renamed Mount Sinai West in November 2015.

=== N ===
- NewYork–Presbyterian - Allen Hospital, 5141 Broadway, Manhattan. Named in honor of Charles F. and Frances Allen after a donation by their children, Herbert and Charles Allen Jr. Opened July 21, 1988.
- NewYork–Presbyterian/Columbia University Medical Center, 630 West 168th Street, Manhattan. Founded as Presbyterian Hospital at Park Avenue and East 70th Street on February 28, 1868, renamed Columbia Presbyterian Hospital and moved to its current location on 1927, renamed Columbia University Medical Center upon its merger with New York Hospital in 1997.
- NewYork–Presbyterian/Lower Manhattan Hospital, 170 William Street, Manhattan. Multiple predecessor institutions:
  - New York Infirmary was founded by Elizabeth Blackwell as the New York Dispensary for Poor Women and Children at 207 East 7th Street in 1853, renamed New York Infirmary for Indigent Women and Children in 1857, moved to 321 East 15th Street in 1858, and renamed New York Infirmary.
  - St. Gregory's Free Emergency Accident Hospital and Ambulance Station was founded by the Volunteers of America at 93 Gold Street in 1905, and renamed Volunteer Hospital by 1908, moved to 117 Beekman Street in 1917, renamed Beekman Street Hospital in 1922, and renamed Beekman Hospital by 1924.
  - Broad Street Hospital was founded on April 12, 1916, opened at 127-129 Broad Street on September 17, 1917, and was renamed Downtown Hospital in 1938.
  - Beekman and Downtown Hospitals merged to form Beekman-Downtown Hospital on August 19, 1945.
  - New York Infirmary and Beekman Downtown Hospitals merged to form New York Infirmary-Beekman Downtown Hospital on November 19, 1979, consolidated at the Beekman site in 1981, renamed New York Downtown Hospital in 1991, renamed NYU Downtown Hospital in 1997, reverted to New York Downtown Hospital in 2005, and renamed New York-Presbyterian/Lower Manhattan Hospital in 2013.
- NewYork-Presbyterian/Weill Cornell Medical Center, 525 East 68th Street, Manhattan. Granted a royal charter by George III on June 13, 1771 and opened as New York Hospital on January 3, 1791 on the block bounded by Broadway, Church Street, Catherine (now Worth) Street, and Anthony (now Duane) Street. Moved to 7-25 West 15th Street in 1877, became affiliated with Cornell University in 1927, moved to its current site in 1932, renamed Weill Cornell Medical Center upon its merger with Columbia Presbyterian Medical Center in 1997.
- New York Eye and Ear Infirmary of Mount Sinai, 310 East 14th Street, Manhattan. Incorporated March 29, 1822 as the New York Eye Infirmary at 218 2nd Avenue, renamed New York Eye and Ear Infirmary in 1864, renamed on January 22, 2014 after being acquired by Mount Sinai Hospital.
- NYU Hospital for Joint Diseases, 301 East 17th Street, Manhattan. Incorporated as the Jewish Hospital for Deformities and Joint Diseases on October 11, 1905 and opened on November 4, 1906 at 1919 Madison Avenue. The Jewish was dropped from the name within two years and Deformities by 1921. Moved to East 17th Street in 1979, merged with NYU in 2006.
- NYU Langone Medical Center, 550 First Avenue, Manhattan. Consists of Tisch Hospital, the Rusk Institute of Rehabilitation Medicine, and the Hospital for Joint Diseases. Tisch Hospital was founded as New-York Post-Graduate Hospital and affiliated with the New York Post-Graduate Medical School on June 15, 1882, opened at 226 East 20th Street on March 21, 1884, moved to 222 East 20th Street on May 8, 1894, then to 303 East 20th Street, took over Reconstruction Hospital on December 1, 1929, merged with NYU-Bellevue on November 9, 1948, renamed University Hospital on December 1, 1948, moved to 560 First Avenue on June 9, 1963, renamed Tisch Hospital for the Tisch family on January 25, 1989, and is currently part of NYU Langone Medical Center. The Hospital for Joint Diseases opened as the Jewish Hospital for Deformities and Joint Diseases at 1919 Madison Avenue in 1906, moved to 301 East 17th Street in 1979 and was named The Hospital for Joint Diseases Orthopaedic Institute, and merged with NYU Medical Center in 2006. The Rusk Institute was founded as the Institute for Rehabilitation Medicine by Howard A. Rusk and opened on East 38th street in June 1948, and renamed the Rusk Institute in his honor on June 18, 1984.

=== O-Z ===
- Rockefeller Institute Hospital, 1230 York Avenue, Manhattan. Opened on October 17, 1910, first patient hospitalized on October 26, 1910. This is a 20-bed research hospital, and all patients are subjects in research studies.

== Closed hospitals ==
Also includes hospitals that were merged into others.

=== A-C ===
- Babies' Hospital in the City of New York, Lexington Avenue and East 55th Street, Manhattan. Incorporated September 17, 1887. Became part of Columbia Presbyterian and is currently Morgan Stanley Children's Hospital.
- Beekman-Downtown Hospital, 117 Beekman Street, Manhattan. See New York-Presbyterian/Lower Manhattan Hospital, in the section on hospitals in Manhattan above.
- Beth David Hospital, 321 East 42nd Street, Manhattan. Incorporated as the Yorkville Dispensary for Women and Children at 246-248 East 82nd Street on November 29, 1886, moved to 1822-1828 Lexington Avenue and 113th Street in April 1912 and into a new building on the site on June 1, 1913, moved to its last location in 1957, renamed Grand Central Hospital on July 3, 1959, and closed in late 1962 or early 1963.
- Bloomingdale Asylum for the Insane, Manhattan. Incorporated as the Society of the hospital in the City of New York in America, and later as the Society of the New York Hospital. Renamed the Bloomingdale Asylum for the Insane and moved to the current site of Columbia University in Morningside Heights in 1821, renamed the Payne Whitney Psychiatric Clinic and moved to White Plains in 1894.
- Broad Hospital, 127-129 Broad Street, Manhattan. See New York-Presbyterian/Lower Manhattan Hospital, in the section on hospitals in Manhattan above.
- Cabrini Medical Center, 227 East 19th Street, Manhattan. Formed in September 1973 after the merger of Columbus and Italian Hospitals. Closed in March 2008, now co-op apartments.
- Centre Street Hospital, Manhattan (1872)
- Charles B. Towns Hospital, 293 Central Park West, Manhattan. Opened 1901. Closed 1931.
- Columbus Hospital, 226 East 20th Street, Manhattan. Founded by the Salesian Missionary Sisters of the Sacred Heart in 1892, opened at 41 East 12th Street, became incorporated on March 26, 1895, moved to East 20th Street in 1895, renamed Cabrini Hospital in September 1973 after its merger with Italian Hospital, and closed in March 2008. The buildings are now co-op apartments.
- Community Hospital, 8 St. Nicholas Place, Manhattan, now a group home.
- Debarkation Hospital no. 1, Ellis Island (Manhattan). Use of Ellis Island Immigration Center's Hospital buildings was transferred from the United States Department of Labor to the Army on March 8, 1918. The hospital closed on June 30, 1919.

=== D-E ===
- Debarkation Hospital no. 5, Manhattan. Lexington Avenue between 46th and 47th Streets. Opened in December 1918 in the building previously known as the Grand Central Palace, and closed on June 30, 1919.
- Demilt Dispensary, 2nd Avenue and East 23rd Street, Manhattan. Opened in 1851, consolidated with Park Hospital and the Institute for Crippled and Disabled Men, on the site of Park Hospital, to form Reconstruction Hospital on February 19, 1921.
- Doctors Hospital (Manhattan), 170 East End Avenue, Manhattan. Founded in 1929, formally opened on February 9, 1930, first patients hospitalized on February 19, 1930. In 1991 renamed Beth Israel North. Demolished for condominium apartments in 2005.
- Downtown Hospital, 127-129 Broad Street, Manhattan. See New York-Presbyterian/Lower Manhattan Hospital, in the section on hospitals in Manhattan above.
- Eclectic Medical Dispensary of the City of New York, (1840–1870) was a 19th-century charitable dispensary at 223 East 26th Street that offered free medical and surgical treatment to indigent patients.
- Ellis Island Immigrant Hospital. Opened in 1902 and closed in 1930. From March 8, 1918 to June 30, 1919 it was designated as the United States Army's Debarkation Hospital no. 1.
- Embarkation Hospital no. 4, 345 West 50th Street, Manhattan. Opened via lease of the New York Polyclinic Medical School and Hospital was leased by the U.S. Army on October 20, 1918, formally opened in December 1918, and transferred back to New York Polyclinic on August 15, 1919.

=== F-G ===
- Fifth Avenue Hospital, Fifth Avenue between 105th and 106th Streets, Manhattan. Opened on September 28, 1922, merged with Flower Hospital to form Flower and Fifth Avenue Hospitals with Flower moving into the Fifth Avenue Building on December 16, 1935. Closed in the 1980s and became the Terence Cardinal Cooke Health Center, a facility for patients with AIDS.
- Flower and Fifth Avenue Hospital, Fifth Avenue between 105th and 106th Streets, Manhattan. Formed by the merger of Flower and Fifth Avenue Hospitals with the former moving into the latter's building on December 16, 1935, Closed in the 1980s to become the Terence Cardinal Cooke Health Center, a facility for patients with AIDS.
- Flower Hospital, Fifth Avenue between 105th and 106th Streets, Manhattan. Named for Roswell P. Flower and opened at Eastern Boulevard (later Avenue A, then York Avenue) between East 63rd and East 64th Street on January 7, 1890, merged with Fifth Avenue Hospital and moved into the Fifth Avenue Building to form Flower and Fifth Avenue Hospitals on December 16, 1935, Closed in the 1980s to become the Terence Cardinal Cooke Health Center, a facility for patients with AIDS.
- Francis Delafield Hospital, 99 Fort Washington Avenue, Manhattan. Named after Francis Delafield, Opened 1948. Closed 1979. Now the Fort Washington Houses, a senior housing complex.
- French Hospital, 330 West 30th Street, Manhattan. Opened at 450-458 West 34th Street in 1881, moved to its later location in the 1930s, closed on May 13, 1977, now apartments.
- German Hospital and Dispensary in the City of New York, East 77th street between Park and Lexington Avenues, Manhattan. Incorporated 1861, opened September 13, 1869, renamed Lenox Hill Hospital in 1918. The dispensary unit was located at 8 East 3rd Street.
- Gotham Hospital, 30 East 76th Street, Manhattan;. became Madison Avenue Hospital 1950. Now apartments.
- Gouverneur Hospital, 227 Madison Street, Manhattan. Opened in the financial district on October 5, 1885, moved to 621 Water Street at Gouverneur Slip and the East River on January 7, 1901, closed in 1961, re-opened on Madison Street on September 21, 1972, closed again in 1976. The Water Street building was converted to an assisted living residence and the Madison Street Building in an outpatient clinic.
- Gramercy Hospital, 322 East 19th Street, Manhattan. A private maternity hospital.
- Grand Central Hospital, 321 East 42nd Street, Manhattan. Originally Beth David Hospital, which was in other locations for many years, moved to its last location in 1957, renamed Grand Central Hospital on July 3, 1959, and closed in late 1962 or early 1963. Replaced by an office building.

=== H-I ===
- Hahnemann Hospital, Park Avenue and 68th Street, Manhattan. Founded on September 7, 1869, opened at 307 East 55th Street in January 1870, moved to 658 Fourth (renamed) Park Avenue on October 31, 1878, closed in 1922. Demolished, replaced by co-op apartments.
- Har Moriah of the Galician and Bucovinaen Federation, 138 and 140 East 2nd Street, Manhattan. Opened on November 15, 1908, incorporated on January 13, 1909. Also called Mount Moriah Hospital.
- Herman Knapp Memorial Eye Institute, 10th Avenue and 57th Street, Manhattan. Opened by Herman Knapp at 46 East 12th Street in 1869, renamed the Herman Knapp Memorial Eye Hospital in June 1913 after his death, moved to 500 West 57th Street after 1912, merged with and moved to Columbia Presbyterian Medical Center on January 1, 1940.
- House of Relief, 63 Hudson Street, Manhattan.
- Hospital for Joint Diseases, Manhattan. See N.Y.U. Langone Medical Center, in the section on hospitals in Manhattan above.
- Hospital for the Relief of the Ruptured and Crippled, 321 East 42nd Street, Manhattan. See Hospital for Special Surgery, in the section on hospitals in Manhattan above.
- Hudson View Hospital, 633 West 152nd Street, Manhattan.
- Institute for Rehabilitation Medicine, Manhattan. See N.Y.U. Langone Medical Center, in the section on hospitals in Manhattan above.
- Italian Hospital, 123 West 110th Street, Manhattan. Incorporated July 12, 1905 and opened at 165-169 West Houston Street, moved to 617 East 83rd Street in October 1912, took over Parkway Hospital in the 1950s, renamed Cabrini Medical Center after its merger with Columbus Hospital in 1973. Cabrini closed in March 2008, now co-op apartments.

=== J-K ===
- J. Hood Wright Hospital, 503 West 131st Street, Manhattan. Incorporated as the Manhattan Dispensary on May 23, 1862, became a hospital in 1885, renamed J. Hood Wright Memorial Hospital on August 31, 1895, renamed Knickerbocker Hospital on June 16, 1913. Closed in 1979, now senior housing.
- James Ewing Hospital, predecessor was "City Cancer Hospital on Welfare Island. The First Avenue Manhattan location opened in 1950. Memorial Sloan Kettering took over running James Ewing Hospital in 1968. The building is now Memorial Sloan Kettering's Schwartz Research Center.
- Jewish Maternity Hospital, 270-272 East Broadway, Manhattan. Opened February 15, 1909. Agreed to merge with Beth Israel Hospital on December 19, 1929 and completed the merger by moving to Stuyvesant Square when Beth Israel moved to that location in 1931.
- Jewish Memorial Hospital, Broadway at West 196th Street, Manhattan, opened 1936. Closed 1983. Founded in 1905, at Fifth Avenue and 128th Street.
- Jews' Hospital, 8th Avenue and West 28th Street, Manhattan. See Mount Sinai Hospital, in the section on hospitals in Manhattan above.
- Knickerbocker Hospital, 70 Convent Ave, Manhattan. Incorporated as the Manhattan Dispensary on May 23, 1862, became a hospital in 1885, renamed J. Hood Wright Memorial Hospital on August 31, 1895, renamed Knickerbocker Hospital on June 16, 1913. Current building constructed in 1926, closed in 1979. Now senior housing.

=== L ===
- Laura Franklin Hospital, 17-19 East 111th Street, Manhattan.
- Leff-Central Park Hospital, Manhattan.
- LeRoy Hospital, 40 East 61st Street, Manhattan. Opened in 1928, closed in 1980. Now condominium apartments.
- Lutheran Hospital of Manhattan, 343 Convent Avenue at West 144th Street, Manhattan, built 1930. Merged with Lutheran of Brooklyn in July 1956 to form Our Savior's Lutheran Hospital. Now apartments.
- Lying-In Hospital, Chartered March 1, 1799, relocated more than once, closed and reopened after receiving private funding for purchase of a building, which was subsequently razed. Moved to 305 Second Avenue by 1895, merged with New York Hospital in 1929 and moved to their building at 525 East 68th Street on September 1, 1932. Now co-op apartments. Also 530 East 70th Street, Manhattan.

=== M ===
- Madison Avenue Hospital, 30 East 76th Street, Manhattan. Opened 1929 as Gotham Hospital. Bought 1950, renamed Madison. Now apartments.
- Manhattan General Hospital, 305 Second Avenue, Manhattan. Opened at 8th Avenue and 25th Street in 1880, opened at 10th Avenue and 131st Street on December 12, 1885, opened at 161 East 90th Street in about 1928. Moved to the building previously occupied by the Lying-In Hospital on July 26, 1936. Usually referred to as simply "Manhattan Hospital". Merged with nearby Beth Israel Hospital in 1964 and closed. Now co-op apartments.
- Manhattan Maternity Hospital, Manhattan. Merged with New York Hospital and Lying-In Hospital, moving with the latter into New York Hospital's building on September 1, 1932.
- Medical Arts Center Hospital, 57 West 57th Street, Manhattan. Now drug rehabilitation.
- Metropolitan Throat Hospital, opened January 5, 1874 at 17 Stuyvesant Street (Third Avenue). It moved to 314 East 45th Street in 1879 and then 351 West 34th Street in 1883. It is unrelated to Metropolitan Hospital, though the throat hospital was sometimes reported under that name in its early years. In 1926, it merged into the Manhattan Eye, Ear and Throat Hospital.
- Midtown Hospital, 309 East 49th Street, Manhattan. Founded 1891. Opened as free clinic in March 1892 at 833 Third Avenue. Incorporated as the New York Throat and Nose Hospital in 1893. Moved to premises at 249 E. 59th St. in 1894. Re-named New York Throat, Nose, and Lung Hospital in 1899. Moved to 229 and 231 E. 57th Street in 1905. Purchased at 227 East 57th Street in 1922. Renamed Midtown Hospital on July 10, 1923. Moved to its latter site on 49th Street in 1929. Closed its doors by 1979 when it was subsumed into NYU's Medical Research Center. Demolished for co-op apartments in 1981.
- Misericordia Hospital, 531 East 86th Street, Manhattan, and 600 East 233rd Street, the Bronx. Opened on Staten Island in 1887, moved to 531 East 86th Street in Manhattan in 1889, moved 600 East 233rd Street in the Bronx in 1958, renamed Our Lady of Mercy Hospital in 1985, acquired by Montefiore Medical Center in 2008 and renamed as their North Division, then as the Wakefield Division of Montefiore.
- Montefiore Home for Chronic Invalids, opened in 1884, on East 84th Street. Subsequently, multiple renames and multiple moves. In 1901, relocated to The Bronx where it is currently known as Montefiore Medical Center.
- Mother Cabrini Memorial Hospital, 611 Edgecombe Avenue, Manhattan. Opened 1936. Closed 1964. Now Edgecombe Residential Treatment Facility.
- Mount Moriah Hospital, 138 and 140 East 2nd Street, Manhattan. Another name for Har Moriah of the Galician and Bucovinaen Federation, in this section.
- Mount Morris Park Hospital, Manhattan.
- Mount Sinai Beth Israel, 1st Avenue and East 16th Street, Manhattan. Incorporated as Beth Israel Hospital on May 28, 1890 and opened at 206 Broadway in 1891, moved to 70 Jefferson Street (at the corner of Cherry Street) on May 25, 1902, moved to its current location on March 12, 1929, merged labor and delivery services with Jewish Maternity Hospital on December 19, 1929, renamed Beth Israel Medical Center on March 10, 1965, renamed Mount Sinai Beth Israel on January 22, 2014 following its merger with Mount Sinai in 2013. Closed in 2025.
- Mount Sinai Roosevelt Hospital, 1000 10th Avenue. This was a name for the Roosevelt division of St. Luke's-Roosevelt Hospital starting about a year after it was acquired by Mount Sinai Hospital. The name was in use from January 22, 2014 to November 2015, when it was renamed Mount Sinai West.
- Murray Hill Hospital, 30 East 40th Street, Manhattan.

=== N ===
- New Amsterdam Eye and Ear Hospital, 230 West 38th Street, Manhattan.
- New York Cancer Hospital, 455 Central Park West. Founded in 1884, renamed General Memorial Hospital for the Treatment of Cancer and Allied Diseases in 1899, renamed Memorial Hospital for the Treatment of Cancer and Allied Diseases in 1916. Closed. Now luxury apartments.
- New York City Asylum for the Insane – see Manhattan Psychiatric Center, in the section on hospitals in Manhattan, above.
- New York City Hospital, Pearl Street, Manhattan. (1864), 150 beds.
- New York City--the new Woman's Hospital, corner of Fiftieth Street and Fourth Avenue, Manhattan. (1876)
- New York Dispensary for Diseases of the Throat and Chest, (1840–1870).
- New York Infirmary, 127-129 Broad Street, Manhattan. See New York-Presbyterian/Lower Manhattan Hospital, in the section on hospitals in Manhattan above.
- New York Infirmary for Women and Children, 321 East 15th Street, Manhattan. Founded in 1853, merged with Beth Israel.
- New York Intestinal Sanitarium, Manhattan.
- New York Nursery and Child's Hospital, Manhattan.
- New York Ophthalmic and Aural Institute, 10th Avenue and 57th Street, Manhattan. Opened by Herman Knapp at 46 East 12th Street in 1869, renamed the Herman Knapp Memorial Eye Hospital in June 1913 after his death, moved to 500 West 57th Street after 1912, merged with and moved to Columbia Presbyterian Medical Center on January 1, 1940.
- New York Ophthalmic Hospital, established at 201 East 23rd Street in Manhattan on May 18, 1869, moved to 415 East 63rd Street and affiliated with New York Homeopathic Medical College and Flower Hospital on January 11, 1933 then included in the merger of Flower and Fifth Avenue Hospital, closed in the 1980s.
- New York Orthopedic Dispensary and Hospital, 420 East 59th Street, Manhattan. (1870).
- New York Polyclinic Hospital, Manhattan. Opened on East 34th Street, moved to 341-351 West 50th Street on May 1, 1912.
- New-York Post-Graduate Hospital, 303 East 20th Street, Manhattan. See N.Y.U. Langone Medical Center, in the section on hospitals in Manhattan above.
- New York Skin and Cancer Hospital, 2nd Avenue and East 19th Street, Manhattan.
- New York Throat, Nose, and Lung Hospital, 309 East 49th Street, Manhattan. Opened at 227 East 57th Street in 1893, renamed Midtown Hospital by 1926, moved to its latter site in 1929. Demolished for co-op apartments.
- North General Hospital, 1879 Madison Avenue, Manhattan. Opened in 1979, closed on July 2, 2010. Now a nursing facility.
- Northeastern Dispensary, 100 East 59th Street, Manhattan. Incorporated on February 18, 1862.
- Northern Dispensary, Waverly Place and Christopher Street, Manhattan. (1840–1870). Vacant.
- Northwestern Dispensary, 511 Eighth Avenue. Incorporated 1852.
- Nursery and Child's Hospital, 571 Lexington Avenue, Manhattan.

=== O-R ===
- Pan American Hospital, 161 East 90th Street, 1920s.
- Park Avenue Hospital, 591 Park Avenue, Manhattan. Now apartments.
- Park East Hospital, 112 East 83rd Street, Manhattan. Opened in 1929, closed July 1, 1977. Now co-op apartments.
- Park Hospital, Central Park West and West 100th Street, Manhattan. Opened as The New York Red Cross Hospital and Training School for Nurses in 1893, renamed Park Hospital on October 27, 1915, consolidated with the DeMilt Dispensary and the Institute for Crippled and Disabled Men into Reconstruction Hospital at the same location on February 19, 1921.
- Park West Hospital, 170 West 76th Street, Manhattan. Opened in 1926, closed 1976. Now co-op apartments.
- Parkway Hospital, 123 West 110 Street, Manhattan. Opened January 4, 1929, renamed Italian Hospital in the 1950s. Now apartments.
- Philanthropin Hospital, 2076 Fifth Avenue, Manhattan.
- Polyclinic Hospital, 345 West 50th Street, Manhattan. Founded in 1895, merged with French Hospital in 1969 to form French and Polyclinic Hospital. The Polyclinic site closed in February 1977. The building is now co-op apartments.
- Reconstruction Hospital, 395 Central Park West, Manhattan. Founded as the Clinic for Functional Re-education on July 15, 1918, and renamed on February 19, 1921 upon consolidation with the DeMilt Dispensary, Park Hospital, and the Institute for Crippled and Disabled Men. Taken over by New-York Post-Graduate Hospital on December 1, 1929.
- Red Cross Hospital, 233 West 100th Street and 395 Central Park West, Manhattan. Opened in 1893, moved to 259 West 93rd Street on January 14, 1899, moved to 100th Street on January 14, 1899, became Park Hospital on October 27, 1915.
- Regent Hospital, 115 East 61st Street, Manhattan, now apartments.
- Riverside Hospital, North Brother Island, Manhattan. Originally named Smallpox Hospital when it opened on the southern end of Blackwell's Island in 1872, renamed Riverside Hospital in 1874, moved to North Brother Island in 1885.
- Rockefeller War Demonstration Hospital, 1230 York Avenue, Manhattan. Opened on October 17, 1917, first patient hospitalized on October 26, 1910. Also known as Rockefeller base hospital and United States Army Auxiliary Hospital No. 1 was a World War One era field hospital designed, located and operated by Rockefeller Institute for Medical Research.
- Roosevelt Hospital, 1000 Tenth Avenue, Manhattan. Founded in 1871, merged in 1979 with St. Luke's Episcopal Hospital to form St. Luke's-Roosevelt Hospital, acquired by Mount Sinai Hospital in 2013. Renamed Mount Sinai Roosevelt. In 2015, name changed to Mount Sinai West.
- Rusk Institute, Manhattan. See N.Y.U. Langone Medical Center, in the section on hospitals in Manhattan above.

=== S ===
- St. Ann's Maternity Hospital, 13 East 69th Street, Manhattan.
- St. Clare's Hospital, 415 West 51st Street, Manhattan. Opened on November 1, 1934 in the renovated buildings of St. Elizabeth's Hospital, which moved to Washington Heights in 1927. Renamed St. Vincent's Midtown on July 1, 2003, closed in 2007.
- St. Elizabeth's Hospital, 689 Fort Washington Avenue, Manhattan. Opened at 225 West 31st Street in 1870, moved to 415 West 51st Street by 1905, moved to its last location in November 1927, closed in 1981. Now co-op apartments.
- St. Gregory's Hospital, 93 Gold Street, Manhattan. See New York-Presbyterian/Lower Manhattan Hospital, in the section on hospitals in Manhattan above.
- St. Joseph Hospital, E. 109th Street between First Ave and Second Ave. (according to an 1885 map)
- St. Lawrence Hospital, 457 West 163rd Street, at Edgecombe Avenue, Manhattan. Opened on August 10, 1906. Bought by Missionary Sisters of the Sacred Heart of Jesus in 1920 and renamed Mother Cabrini Memorial Hospital. The hospital closed. Currently, Edgecombe Correctional Facility, a minimum-security prison.
- St. Luke's Episcopal Hospital, Amsterdam Avenue at 114th Street, Manhattan. Founded in 1856 and originally housed in the Church of the Holy Communion at Sixth Avenue and 20th Street in Manhattan, moved to Fifth Avenue between 54th and 55th Streets in 1858, moved to its current location in 1896, merged with Roosevelt Hospital to become St. Luke's-Roosevelt Hospital in 1979, acquired by Mount Sinai Hospital in 2013 and renamed Mount Sinai St. Luke's Hospital.
- St. Mark's Hospital, 177 2nd Avenue, Manhattan. Opened at 66 St. Mark's Place in 1887, incorporated later on March 7, 1890, expanded to 177 2nd Avenue on February 17, 1894, closed to new patients July 31, 1930, last patients moved out August 3, 1930.
- St. Mary's Hospital for Children, 405-411 West 34th Street, Manhattan.
- Saint Vincent's Catholic Medical Center, 170 West 12th Street, Manhattan. Incorporated on April 17, 1847 as the Sisters of Charity of St. Vincent de Paul, opened on November 1, 1849, closed April 30, 2010. Replaced by condominium apartments.
- St. Vincent's Midtown, 415 West 51st Street, Manhattan. Formerly St. Clare's Hospital, renamed St. Vincent's Midtown when St. Vincent's Hospital in Greenwich Village took control on July 1, 2003. Closed in 2007.
- Sloane Hospital for Women, 447 West 59th Street, Manhattan. Opened December 29, 1887. A branch of Columbia-Presbyterian Hospital.
- Society of the Lying-in Hospital, 2nd Avenue at East 17th Street, Manhattan.
- Stuyvesant Polyclinic, 137 Second Avenue, Manhattan. Founded in 1906, closed in 2008.
- Stuyvesant Square Hospital, 301 East 19th Street, Manhattan.
- Sydenham Hospital, 565 Manhattan Avenue, Manhattan. Founded as a private hospital at 339-341 East 116th Street on June 20, 1892, moved to Manhattan Avenue in 1926, located at 124 Street West circa 1928, became part of the municipal hospital system on March 3, 1849 [sic ≠ 1949?], closed in 1980 Now senior housing.

=== T-Z ===
- Tonsil Hospital, opened 1921, closed 1946. Did tonsillectomies for the poor; focus was on children.
- Trafalgar Hospital, 161 East 90th Street, Manhattan. Now co-op apartments.
- Trinity Hospital, 50 Varick Street, Manhattan.
- United States Army Auxiliary Hospital No. 1 - See Rockefeller War Demonstration Hospital, in the section on closed hospitals in Manhattan above.
- University Hospital, 560 First Avenue, Manhattan. See N.Y.U. Langone Medical Center, in the section on hospitals in Manhattan above.
- Vincent Sanitarium and Hospital, 2348 7th Avenue, Manhattan. Named after U. Conrad Vincent, a urologist who owned it. Opened in 1929.
- Volunteer Hospital, 93 Gold Street, Manhattan. See New York-Presbyterian/Lower Manhattan Hospital, in the section on hospitals in Manhattan above.
- Wadsworth Hospital, 629 West 185th Street, Manhattan. Now private medical offices.
- Washington Heights Hospital, 554 West 165th Street, Manhattan. Opened September 1, 1905.
- Western Dispensary for Women and Children. 218 Ninth Avenue. Incorporated 1869. Now defunct.
- Wickersham Hospital, 133 East 58th Street, Manhattan.
- Willard Parker Hospital, East River and between East 15th and 16th Streets, Manhattan. Named after Willard Parker. Opened in 1885, closed in 1955 or early 1956.
- Woman's Hospital in New York, 141 West 109th Street, Manhattan. Founded in 1855, now part of Mount Sinai St. Luke's Hospital.
- Women's Infirmary and Dispensary, Manhattan.
- York Hospital, 119 East 74th Street, Manhattan.
- Yorkville Hospital, 246 East 82nd Street, Manhattan.

=== Roosevelt Island (Blackwell's Island / Welfare Island) ===
- Bird S. Coler Hospital, 900 Main Street, Roosevelt Island, Manhattan. See Coler-Goldwater Specialty Hospital, in the section on hospitals in Manhattan above.
- Blackwell's Island Hospital, 800 beds
- Charity Hospital, Blackwell's Island, Manhattan. See Penitentiary Hospital, below.
- City Hospital, Blackwell's Island, Manhattan. See Penitentiary Hospital, below.
- Epileptic Hospital, Blackwell's Island, Manhattan. Opened in 1866.
- Fever Hospitals, Blackwell's Island, Manhattan. Two buildings for typhus and "ship fever."
- Goldwater Memorial Hospital, Welfare Island (now Roosevelt Island), Manhattan. See Coler-Goldwater Specialty Hospital, in the section on hospitals in Manhattan above.
- New York Maternity Hospital, Blackwell's Island, Manhattan.
- Metropolitan Hospital (1894–1955). Originated on Ward's Island as Homeopathic Hospital. Moved to Manhattan in 1955, now called Metropolitan Hospital Center.
- Paralytic Hospital, Blackwell's Island, Manhattan. Opened in 1866.
- Penitentiary Hospital, Roosevelt Island, Manhattan. Opened in 1832 on what was then called Blackwell's Island, renamed Island Hospital on December 15, 1857, destroyed by fire on February 13, 1858, rebuilt as City Hospital and completed in 1861, renamed Charity Hospital in 1870, closed when it and Smallpox Hospital were moved to Queens in 1957, building demolished in 1994, stones salvaged for lining the paths in the Franklin D. Roosevelt Four Freedoms Park.
- Reception Hospital. This name was used for a hospital in the Storehouse Building on Blackwell's Island that transferred patients to the city, Metropolitan, and Central and Neurological Hospitals on Blackwell's Island; and for a hospital on Sea Breeze Avenue in Brooklyn that transferred patients to Kings County Hospital and then became Coney Island Hospital.
- Smallpox Hospital, south end of Blackwell's Island (later Welfare Island, now Roosevelt Island), Manhattan. Opened in 1856, renamed Riverside Hospital in 1874, moved to Queens closed when it and Charity Hospital were moved to Queens in 1957.

=== Ward's Island ===
- Homeopathic Hospital opened 1875, moved to Blaackwell's Island and renamed Metropolitan Hospital in 1894, and subsequently became Manhattan's Metropolitan Hospital Center, still operating
- Inebriate Asylum, Ward's Island, Manhattan. Opened July 21, 1868.
- New York City Lunatic Asylum, Ward's Island, Manhattan. Opened in Bellevue Hospital during 1826, moved to Blackwell's Island in 1839, moved to Ward's Island in about 1872.
- Verplanck State Emigrant Hospital, Ward's Island, Manhattan.

== See also ==
- List of hospitals in New York (state)
  - List of hospitals in New York City
    - List of hospitals in the Bronx
    - List of hospitals in Brooklyn
    - List of hospitals in Queens
    - List of hospitals in Staten Island
