= Martin Gumpert =

German-born physician (1897–1955)

Martin Gumpert (13 November 1897 – 18 April 1955) was a German-born physician, dermatologist, medical historian, and author. Born in Berlin to a family of doctors, Gumpert pursued a medical career, specializing in dermatology and medical history. His early life was marked by service as a medical orderly during World War I and academic pursuits in Berlin and Heidelberg, culminating in a dissertation on syphilis in 1923. A left-wing social activist and trade unionist, Gumpert also engaged in expressionist poetry and literature.

== Early life ==
Gumpert was born on 13 November 1897 in Berlin to his parents Ely, a doctor, and Elise. In 1923 he married Charlotte Blaschko, also a doctor, who died of tuberculosis in 1933. The couple had a daughter, Nina, who was born in around 1927.

Gumpert trained as a doctor in Berlin and Heidelberg, working as a medical orderly during the First World War. His 1923 dissertation was on the history of syphilis, and he went on to write texts on pediatrics and developmental deformity. He studied in Paris in 1928.

Gumpert was a left-wing social activist and trade unionist and published expressionist poetry.

== 1933 to 1936 ==
In 1933 Gumpert was forced out of his medical position by the Nazi rise to power. Over the next few years he wrote several texts of literature and the history of science and medicine. He was further excluded from the association of German writers, the Reichsverband deutscher Schriftsteller as a Jew in 1935 and emigrated to the United States in 1936.

== United States career ==
Gumpert opened a dermatology practice in New York in 1936 and became a US citizen in 1942. During these years Gumpert became a friend of the siblings Erika and Klaus Mann and in 1949 visited their father Thomas Mann in Germany. Thomas Mann used Gumpert's medical knowledge on the course of syphilis in writing his novel Doktor Faustus.

From 1952 Gumpert edited the gerontology journal Lifetime Living and worked as a geriatrician at the Jewish Memorial Hospital, New York.

Gumpert continued to write about the exile experience in poems and literary publications.

Gumpert died on 18 April 1955.

== Literary works ==
- Hahnemann Biographie, 1934
- Das Leben für die Idee, 1935
- Dunant: The Story of the Red Cross, 1938 (translated by Whittaker Chambers)
- Hell in Paradise, 1939
- Heil Hunger!, 1940
- You are younger than you think, 1944
- First Papers 1945 Preface by Thomas Mann, Dell, Sloan & Pearce, New York
- Hahnemann; The Adventurous Career of a Medical Rebel 1945, LB Fischer, New York
- Birthday, 1947
- The Anatomy of Happiness, 1951, McGraw-Hill
- You and Your Doctor, 1952, Bobbs-Merrill

== Biographical references in German ==
- Karin Geiger: Der diagnostische Blick – Martin Gumpert als Arzt, Medizinhistoriker und ärztlicher Schriftsteller. Gardez!-Verlag, Remscheid 2004, ISBN 3-89796-145-8 (Dissertation, University of Münster 2003)
- Jutta Ittner: Augenzeuge im Dienst der Wahrheit. Leben und literarisches Werk Martin Gumperts (1897-1955). Aisthesis Verlag, Bielefeld 1998, ISBN 3-89528-170-0 (Dissertation, University of Hamburg 1994)
- Ulrike Keim: Ein außergewöhnliches Leben in zwei Welten – Der Arzt, Dichter, Forscher und Schriftsteller Martin Gumpert. Hentrich und Hentrich Verlag, Berlin 2022, ISBN 978-3-95565-544-0
- Markwart Michler: Gumpert, Martin. In: Neue Deutsche Biographie (NDB). Band 7, Duncker & Humblot, Berlin 1966, ISBN 3-428-00188-5, p. 306.
- Doina Rosenberg: Martin Gumpert – Arzt und Schriftsteller. Dissertation, FU Berlin 2000
- Heinz Saueressig: Im Winkel der Medizingeschichte. Der Lebensweg des Dermatologen Martin Gumpert. Basotherm Förderkreis, Biberach an der Riss 1987. 20 pages.
- Andreas Wittbrodt: Ein gebildeter Sozialarzt. Die Lebensform des Migranten Martin Gumpert in Berlin und New York im Spiegel der Autobiographik. In: Emigrantenschicksale. Einfluss der jüdischen Emigranten auf Sozialpolitik und Wissenschaft in den Aufnahmeländern. Frankfurt am Main 2004, p155–167
