= Edward Laska =

Edward Laska (January 3, 1894 – April 27, 1959) was an American songwriter who worked as both a composer and lyricist in Tin Pan Alley. He wrote the lyrics to the hit songs "How'd You Like to Spoon With Me?" (1905) and "The Alcholic Blue" (1919). Also a playwright, his play We've Got to Have Money was staged on Broadway in 1923. He was the longtime director of the Dramatists Guild of America.

== Life and career ==
Edward Laska was born on January 3, 1894 in New York City. He was educated in New York City Public Schools and at the City College of New York. He was a Tin Pan Alley songwriter who sold his first song, "Tulips" in 1903. He contributed the lyrics to the hit song "How'd You Like to Spoon With Me?" (music by Jerome Kern) which was introduced in the Broadway musical The Earl and the Girl (1905). In 1914 he was a founding member of the American Society of Composers, Authors and Publishers. With Albert Von Tilzer he co-wrote the hit song "The Alcoholic Blues" (1919) which by the end of 1920 had been recorded 22 times by a variety of artists.

Laska wrote the play We've Got to Have Money which was staged on Broadway at the Playhouse Theatre in 1923. He was the longtime director of the Dramatists Guild of America.

Laska died at Trafalgar Hospital in New York City on April 27, 1959 at the age of 75.
