= Western Dispensary for Women and Children =

Defunct New York City hospital

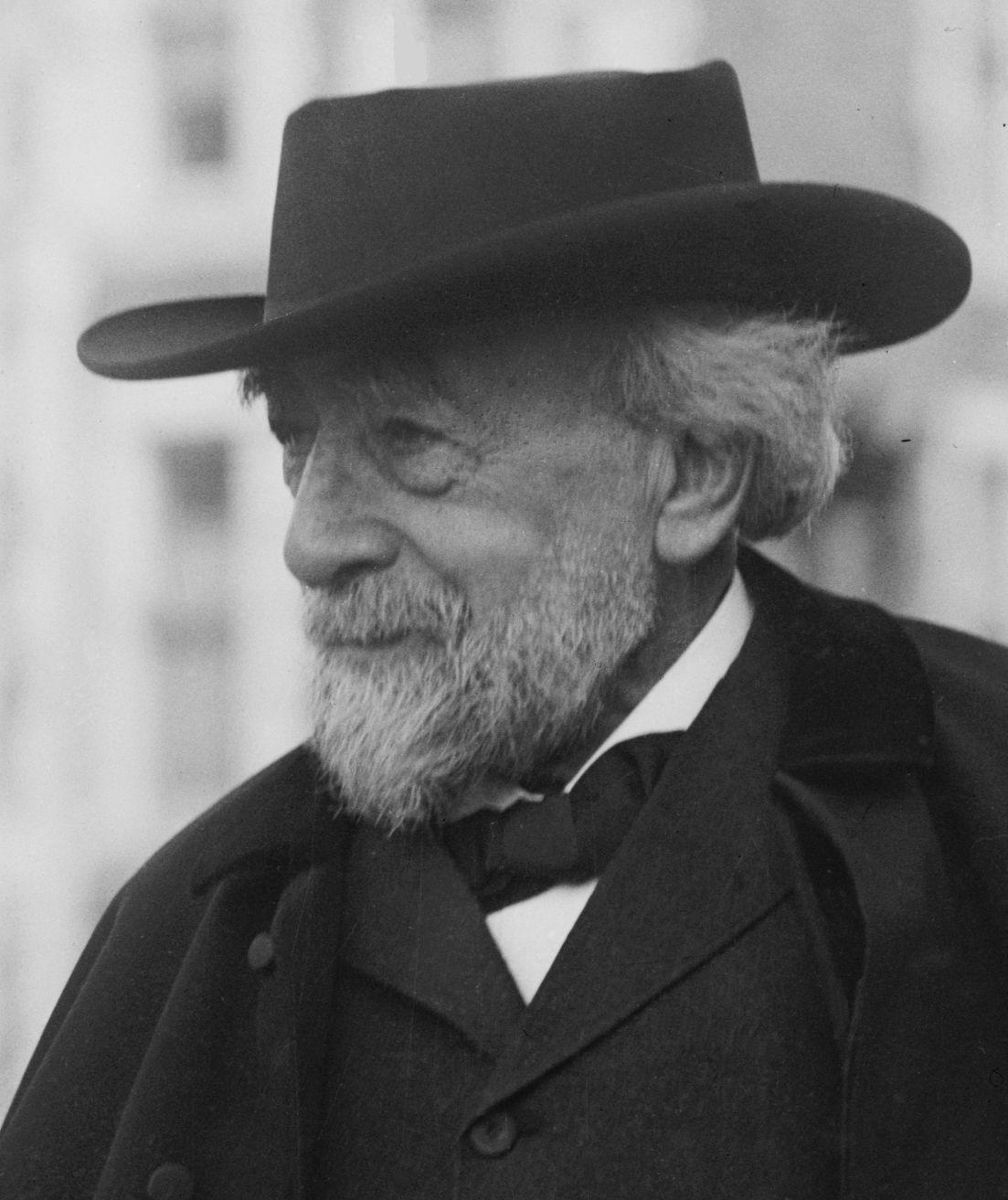
Hospital co-founder Abraham Jacobi, Father of American Pediatrics.

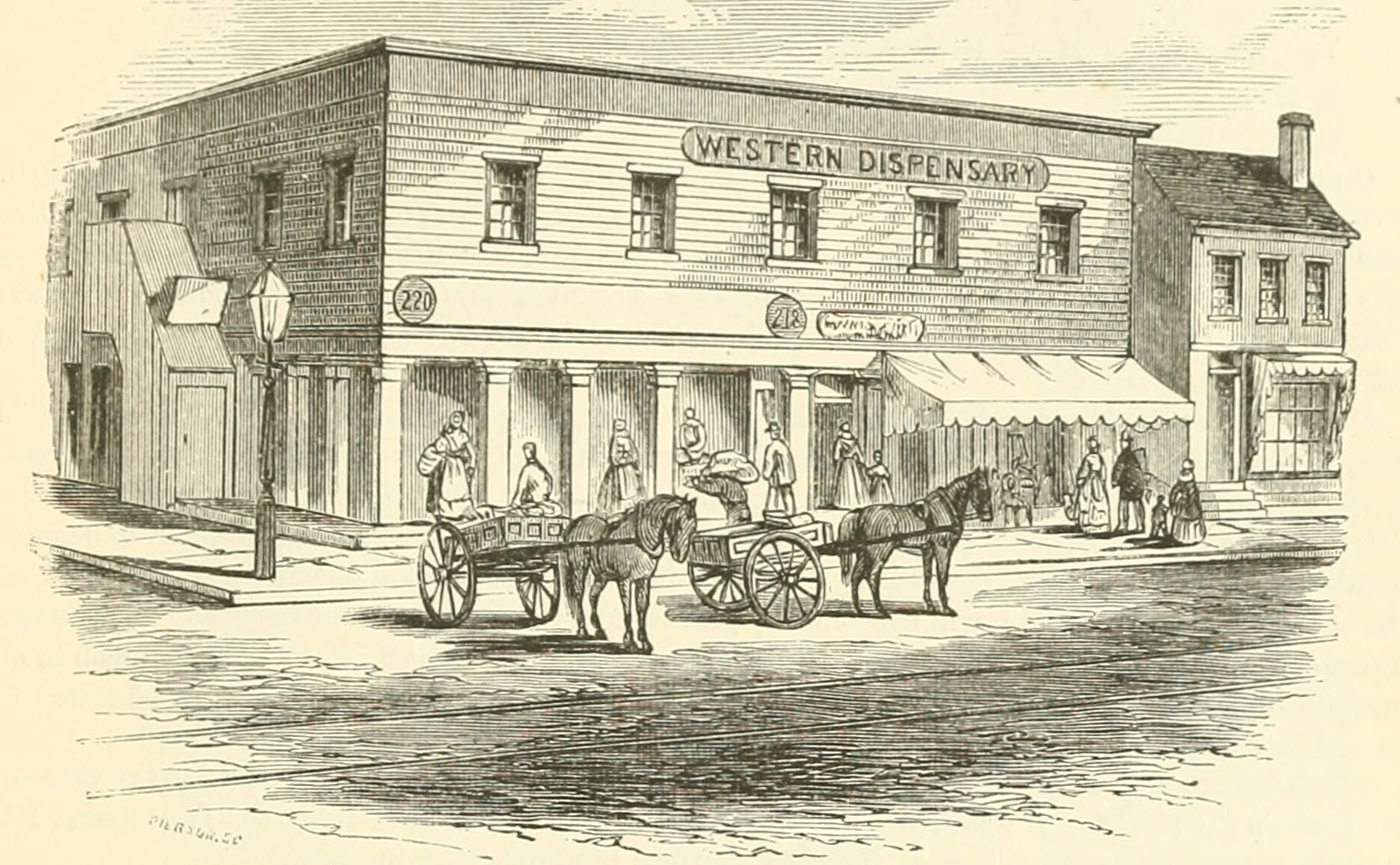
View published in 1870. The address, 218 Ninth Avenue, became 242 around that time as part of an avenue renumbering.

The Western Dispensary for Women and Children, now defunct, was a Manhattan hospital incorporated in March 1869, located at 218 Ninth Avenue. Unlike the government-funded Northwestern Dispensary, this hospital had trouble meeting their financial obligations. Abraham Jacobi, a co-founder of the hospital, is regarded as the Father of American Pediatrics.

== Controversy ==
A portion of a large sum left by "an eccentric old maid" was directed by her will to Western Dispensary for Women and Children and several other institutions, Some of her nieces and nephews contested the will. When Surrogate Court held hearings, there was "a large attendance" of "the various charitable institutions which are beneficiaries."

== Notable people ==
- Mary A. Brinkman, homeopathic physician appointed to the hospital
- Anna Lukens, attending physician of the hospital
- Samuel Baldwin Ward, surgeon at the hospital

== See also ==
- List of hospitals in Manhattan
