= Madison Avenue Hospital =

Defunct hospital in Manhattan, New York

Geography
- Location: Manhattan, New York, United States
- Coordinates: 40.77417°N 73.96333°W

Services
- Beds: 121

History
- Former name: Gotham Hospital
- Opened: 1950
- Closed: 1976

Links
- Lists: Hospitals in New York State
- Other links: List of hospitals in Manhattan

Madison Avenue Hospital was a 121-bed hospital on the Upper East Side of Manhattan, New York City, that opened in 1950 and closed in 1976. In 1971, it was described as "a profit-making institution where abortions are performed on a large scale."

One unresolved problem with the hospital's building, noted in 1969, was that at the "16-story structure at 30 East 76th Street built in 1928, there is only one exit." The building has been converted to luxury apartments.

== History ==
Madison opened in 1950 when Dr. Imre Weitzner "headed a syndicate that bought the proprietary hospital, then called Gotham Hospital" which was renamed Madison Avenue Hospital. By 1971, his son "Dr. Howard B. Weitzner, chief of gynecology at Madison Avenue Hospital" had opened an abortion referral service, the subject of "questioning by a legislative committee." There were other hearings regarding funding in 1974.

=== Loss of funding ===
Madison was the third of a series of hospitals closed in the mid-1970s for "life-threatening fire and health violations". Linden General Hospital and Wadsworth Hospital were the prior pair. Initially, the each lost certification, then they lost funding. As a result, it was "economically unfeasible for the hospital to stay in business."

== Gotham Hospital ==
Gotham Hospital was planned as "a hospital for people with average incomes" with doctors "who at present are without hospital affiliations;" it later became Madison Avenue Hospital. When Gotham opened their 30 East 76th Street 16-story 121-bed hospital on November 7, 1929, affordable care was still their focus. A group of doctors bought Gotham in 1950 and renamed it Madison Avenue Hospital.
