= James Ewing =

James Ewing may refer to:

- James Ewing (pathologist) (1866–1943), American pathologist and oncologist
- James D. Ewing (1917–2002), American newspaper publisher, government reform advocate and philanthropist
- James Eugene Ewing, American evangelist associated with St. Matthew's Churches
- James Caruthers Rhea Ewing (1854–1925), American missionary to India
- James Alfred Ewing (1855–1935), Scottish physicist and engineer
- James Arthur Ewing (1916–1996), 40th Governor of American Samoa
- James Ewing (Pennsylvania politician) (1736–1806), American colonial-era politician
- James Ewing (MP) (1784–1852), Member of Parliament for Wareham, 1830–1831
- James Ewing of Strathleven (1775–1853), Member of Parliament for Glasgow, 1832–1835 and co-founder of the Glasgow Necropolis
- James Stevenson Ewing (1835–1918), American lawyer and diplomat

== See also ==
- Jamie Ewings (born 1984), Scottish footballer
