= Tonsil Hospital =

Defunct New York City hospital

The Tonsil Hospital, which opened in 1921 at 153 East 62nd St, and closed in 1946, was a Manhattan specialized hospital dedicated to just one task: "remove the tonsils and adenoids of poor children" when the need seemed to exist.

The hospital was in a four-story walkup building. As a hospital for the poor, pre-Medicaid, it was in need of funding from "society" donors, sponsorships, and other fundraisers.

The removal of tonsils, tonsillectomies, "was the single most common operation in the United States." Due to "the variability of available surgical techniques" this hospital's medical director, Robert Fowler, "undertook a quest for the 'better tonsil operation.'"

== See also ==
- List of hospitals in Manhattan
