= Alfred A. Richman =

Surgeon, hospital founder

Alfred A. Richman (c. 1892 – December 8, 1984) was "an orthopedic surgeon and an honorary trustee of Beth Israel Hospital" who "founded Manhattan General Hospital in 1928 and was its executive director".

== Medical career ==
Richman graduated from New York Medical College and was a "practicing orthopedic surgeon for a number of years". The rest of his career involved medical facilities:

- A "private sanitarium at 50 West Seventy-fourth Street" (1925-1928)
- 136 East 61st Street (1928–1930): a 20-bed facility named Plaza Hospital. Closed.
- 161 East 90th Street (1930–1934): Manhattan General Hospital. MGH relocated, and another hospital purchased the building.
- 305 Second Avenue (1934–1964): Manhattan General Hospital. acquired by Beth Israel in 1964.

Richman subsequently served Beth Israel as a "trustee and as an administrative consultant".

=== Tuberculosis treatment ===
In 1949, "under Dr. Richman's direction, Manhattan General became the first private, nonvoluntary institution in the city to set aside wards for the care of tuberculosis patients." A 1951 journal noted the unit's "multiple and vesatile" treatments.

== Family ==
He was survived by his wife, their three sons and a daughter, nine grandchildren, two great-grandchildren, and three brothers, Hyman, David, and Julius.
