= Samuel Baldwin Ward =

Surgeon (NYC, Albany) & author

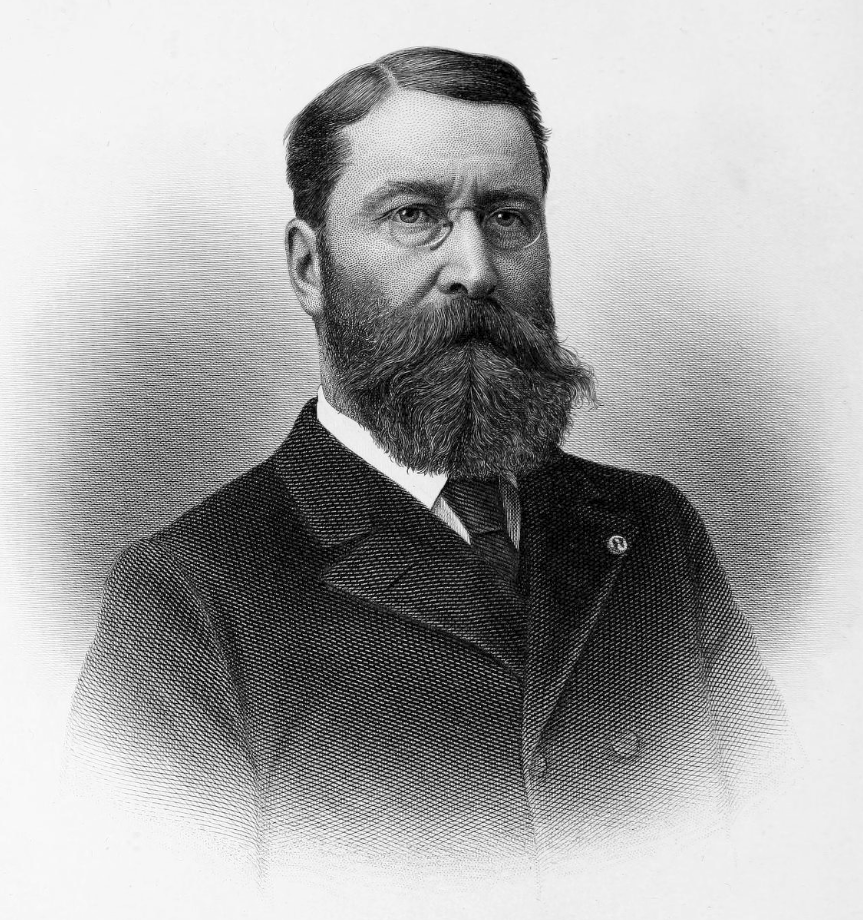
- Born: June 8, 1842; New York, New York
- Died: June 3, 1915 (aged 72); Albany, New York
- Education: Columbia University; Georgetown University School of Medicine
- Occupation: Surgeon
- Spouse: Cornelia Augusta Wheeler (m. 1871; died 1883)
- Children: 3

Signature
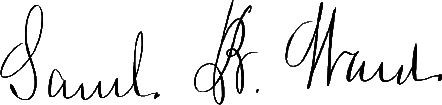

Samuel Baldwin Ward (June 8, 1842 - June 3, 1915) was a surgeon who operated in New York City and in Albany. He also published writings in the field of medicine, and was the Dean of Albany Medical College 1905–1914.

== Biography ==
Samuel Baldwin Ward was born in New York City on June 8, 1842. His parents were Lebbeus Baldwin Ward and Abby Dwight (Partridge) Ward. Ward's medical degree was from Georgetown University School of Medicine (1864); his undergraduate degree was from Columbia University.

He was a consulting surgeon of the Western Dispensary for Women and Children.

He married Cornelia Augusta Wheeler in 1871, and they had three children. Their daughter, Anna Wheeler Ward, married Henry M. Sage October 29, 1895. The Sages, who together had two daughters, divorced in 1908.

Samuel Baldwin Ward died at his home in Albany, New York on June 3, 1915.

== Works ==
- Progress in Surgery:
- "Hun, Edward Reynolds" in American Medical Biographies
