= Trafalgar Hospital =

Defunct Manhattan hospital, now medical offices

Coordinates: 40°46′55″N 73°57′11″W

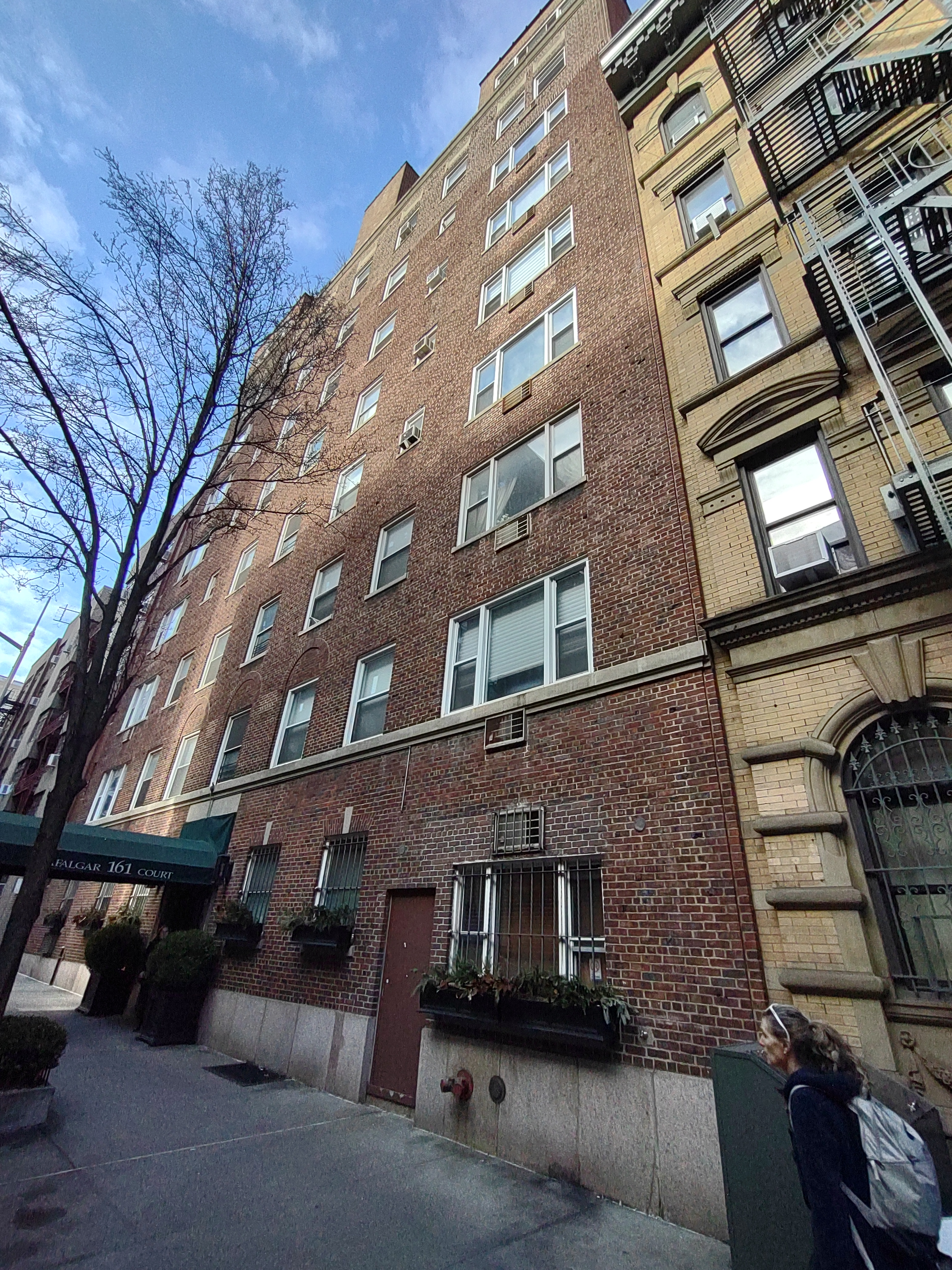

Geography
- Location: Manhattan, New York, United States

Services
- Beds: 145

History
- Closed: before 1978

Links
- Lists: Hospitals in New York State
- Other links: List of hospitals in Manhattan

Trafalgar Hospital was a 145-bed private nonprofit institution at 161 East 90th Street in Manhattan, New York, USA. The building previously housed three other hospitals, including the Pan American Hospital in the 1920s. By 1966, Trafalgar had replaced both coal and oil heating with gas. This one-time expenditure of $20,000 saved $12,000 per year.

By late 1978, after facing regulatory and financial difficulties, the hospital had closed, and the 9-story 1926-built building was in the process of being converted into co-operative apartments.
