= James Ewing (pathologist) =

American pathologist (1866–1943)

James S. Ewing
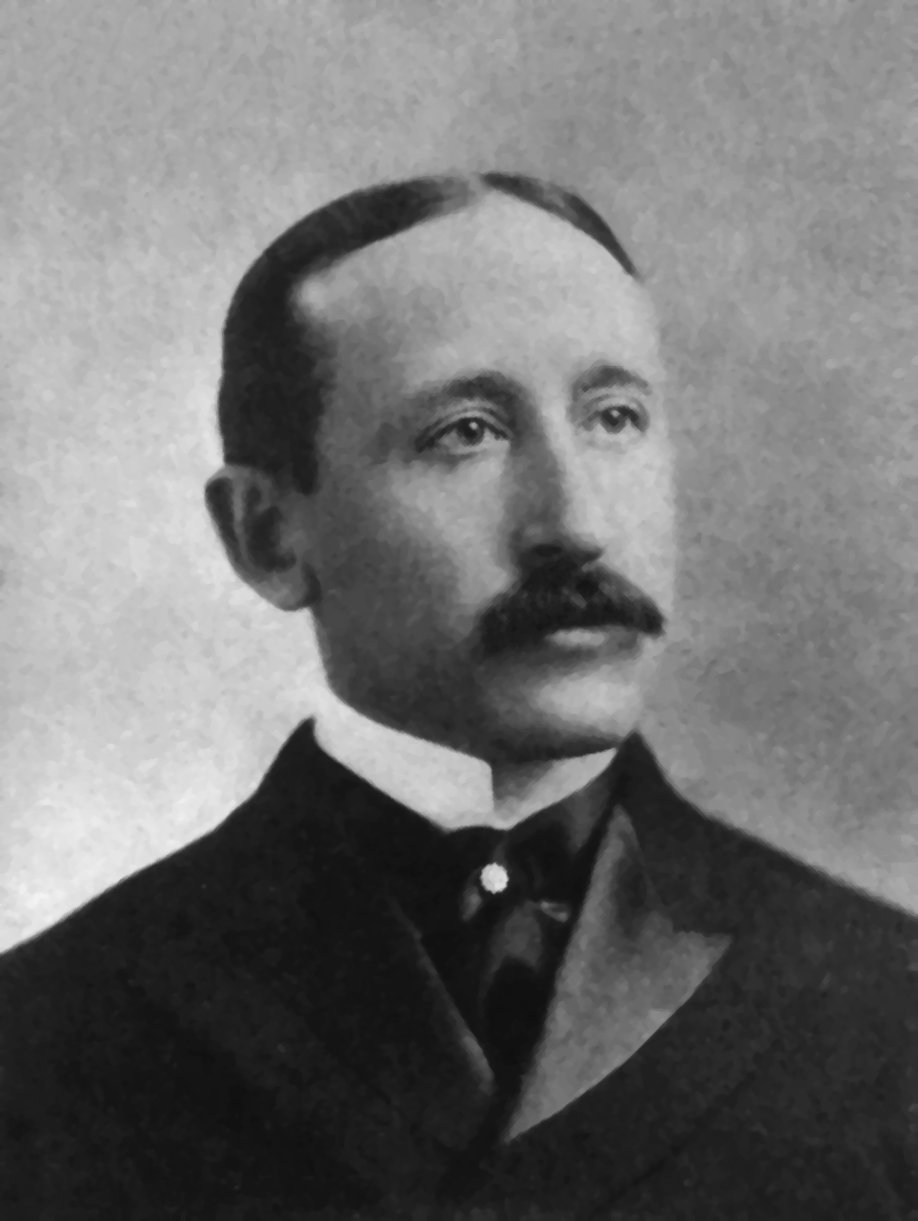
- Born: December 25, 1866; Pittsburgh, Pennsylvania
- Died: May 16, 1943 (aged 76); New York, New York
- Education: Amherst College; Columbia University College of Physicians and Surgeons
- Known for: Ewing sarcoma; tumor pathology
- Awards: Gold-headed cane award (1942)
- Scientific career
- Fields: Cancer research, pathology
- Workplaces: Columbia University; Cornell University; Memorial hospital

James Stephen Ewing (/ˈjuːɪŋ/ YOO-ing; December 25, 1866 in Pittsburgh – May 16, 1943 in New York City) was an American pathologist. He was the first professor of pathology at Cornell University and discovered a form of bone cancer that was later named after him, Ewing sarcoma.

== Early life and education ==
James Ewing, was born in 1866 to a prominent family of Pittsburgh. When he was 14 he was diagnosed with osteomyelitis and was bedridden for two years. He first completed his B.A. in 1888 at Amherst College and then studied medicine at the College of Physicians and Surgeons of New York, from 1888 to 1891.

== Career ==
He returned to the College of Physicians and Surgeons as instructor in histology (1893-1897), and clinical pathology (1897-1898). After a brief stint as a surgeon with the US Army, Ewing was appointed in 1899 the first professor of clinical pathology at the newly formed Medical College of Cornell University in New York, where he was the only full-time professor. In 1902, Ewing helped to establish one of the first funds for cancer research, endowed by Mrs. Collis P. Huntington. With his discoveries using that research funding, Ewing became the most important experimental oncologist and helped found the American Society for the Control of Cancer, now the American Cancer Society, in 1913. Ewing was also one of the co-founders of the American Association for Cancer Research in 1907, and served three terms as its president: in 1907-1908, 1908-1909 and 1937-1938. In 1906 Ewing, working with S.P. Beebe and collaborators, showed the first proof that a cancer (canine transmissible venereal tumor in dogs) could be transmissible.

In 1910, Ewing had approached New York Hospital about establishing a clinical research facility; when this fell through, he established a collaboration with Memorial Hospital (which would become Memorial Sloan Kettering Cancer Center) with the help of industrialist and philanthropist James Douglas, who gave $100,000 to endow twenty beds for clinical research, equipment for working with radium, and a clinical laboratory to Memorial for that purpose. Douglas' enthusiasm and funding for development of radiation therapy for cancer inspired Ewing to become one of the pioneers in developing this treatment. Ewing soon took over effective leadership of clinical and laboratory research at Memorial.

In 1919 Ewing published the first edition of Neoplastic Diseases: A Text-Book on Tumors. The book, which took 10 years to write and is translated into numerous languages, became a cornerstone of modern oncology by establishing a systematic and comprehensive basis for diagnosing human cancer. In 1921, he published a paper describing a type of bone tumor that he named “diffuse endothelioma of bone.” The tumor soon became known as Ewing sarcoma and, by 1927, the term “Ewing's sarcoma” was being used in the medical literature.

The decade from 1920 to 1930 was largely devoted to expanding the various activities of Memorial Hospital and strengthening its affiliation with Cornell University Medical College. In 1931 Ewing was formally appointed president of the hospital, and remained in this post until his retirement in 1939.

== Personal life and death ==
Ewing married Catharine Anne Halsted in June 1900 in New York City. They had one son, James, born in 1902. While pregnant with their second son, Catharine developed preeclampsia and died in July 1903 at the age of 26. Ewing never remarried and died of bladder cancer on May 16, 1943 at the age of 76.

== Legacy ==
Ewing was featured on the cover of Time Magazine in 1931 as "Cancer Man Ewing"; the accompanying article described his role as one of the most important cancer doctors of his era. In 1942, he was presented with the prestigious gold-headed cane award of the American Association of Pathologists and Bacteriologists.

Under his leadership, Memorial became a model for other cancer centers in the United States, combining patient care with clinical and laboratory research, and it was said of him that "The relationship of Ewing to the Memorial Hospital can best be expressed in the words of Emerson, 'Every institution is but the lengthening shadow of some man.' Dr. Ewing is the Memorial Hospital".

In 1951, The James Ewing Hospital, a 12-story building on First Avenue between 67th and 68th Streets, opened; it was intended to treat cancer among New York City's poor.

== Selected publications ==
A collection of his correspondence is held at the National Library of Medicine.

- Ewing, J: Clinical pathology of Blood: A Treatise on the General Principles and Special Applications of Hematology. Philadelphia and New York, 1901.
- Ewing, J: Neoplastic Diseases: A Textbook on Tumors. Philadelphia, W. B. Saunders, and London, 1919. Fourth edition 1940.
- Ewing, J: Causation, Diagnosis and Treatment of Cancer. Baltimore, 1931.
- Ewing, J: Blood. Philadelphia. 1910.

== Further readings ==
- Zantinga, AR; Coppes, MJ: James Ewing (1866-1943): "the chief". Medical and Pediatric Oncology, New York, 1993, 21 (7): 505-510.
- Huvos, AG: James Ewing: cancer man. Annals of Diagnostic Pathology, April 1998, 2 (2): 146-148.
