= S. P. Beebe =

American scientist

Silas Palmer Beebe (April 22, 1876 – December 6, 1930) was an American physician and researcher who specialized in thyroid physiology, cancer research, and experimental therapeutics. He was Professor of Experimental Therapeutics at Cornell Medical School from 1909 to 1915. He became known for his controversial advocacy of an experimental cancer treatment called autolysin.

== Early life and education ==
Beebe was born in St. Johns, Michigan, the son of county judge Aaron Beebe. He attended Harvard University receiving an A.B. in 1900. He subsequently studied organic chemistry at Yale University, where he received an M.S. and Ph.D. in 1904. He graduated from Cornell Medical School with an M.D. in 1909.

== Career ==
Immediately after graduating from Cornell, Beebe was appointed Professor of Experimental Therapeutics and established the department of therapeutics at the medical school. He was also a member of the medical board of Memorial Hospital.

Beebe became interested in cancer research and was an early collaborator of James Ewing on work involving lymphomas in dogs. Beebe was one of the founders of the American Association for Cancer Research in 1907.

== Autolysin ==
In the early 1910s, Austrian physician Alexander Howowitz developed an extract consisting of 12 ingredients, including various leaves, whole plants, roots, flowers, fruit, and wood. In 1912, Beebe, who renamed the extract autolysin, reported using the preparation in combination with radiation therapy in advanced cancer patients at several New York institutions and reported that the treatment prolonged their lives and mitigated their suffering.

The treatment attracted considerable public attention, with the press sometimes portraying it as a cancer cure, although Beebe himself did not call it a cure. He was criticized for the commercial exploitation of the treatment and for the lack of scientific evidence that would allow other researchers to reproduce his work.

In 1915, Dr. Richard Weil, who attended the treatment and studied Beebe's results concluded that: " ...autolysin is useless; that it adds nothing of value to the methods now generally accepted; and that it often aggravates the sufferings and accelerates the death of the patient." Beebe was subsequently asked to resign as professor of experimental therapeutics at Cornell. He was also asked to resign from the American Society for Pharmacology and Experimental Therapeutics for knowingly making false statements on a scientific subject.

== Later career ==
After leaving Cornell, Beebe practiced medicine in New York City, devoting his attention to thyroid physiology. He continued to participate in professional organizations, including the Huntington Fund for Cancer Research and the American Association for the Advancement of Science. His participation in the AACR diminished over the years, and he later resigned his membership.

== Death ==
Beebe died at his residence in New York City after a long illness on December 6, 1930, at the age of 54. He was survived by his widow, Sabina McCarthy Beebe, and three children from an earlier marriage.

== Selected Publications ==
- Beebe, Silas Palmer. (1904). Outlines of Physiological Chemistry. Macmillan.
- Beebe, S. P. (1904). THE CHEMISTRY OF MALIGNANT GROWTHS.—FIRST COMMUNICATION. American Journal of Physiology. Legacy Content. 11(2): 139–144.
- Beebe, S. P. (1904). THE CHEMISTRY OF MALIGNANT GROWTHS. II.—THE INORGANIC CONSTITUENTS OF TUMORS. American Journal of Physiology. Legacy Content, 12(2): 167–172.
- Beebe, S. P., and James Ewing. (1906). "A study of the biology of tumour cells. "The British Medical Journal": 1559–1560.
- Crile, Geo W., and S. P. Beebe. (1908). "Transfusion of blood in the transplantable lymphosarcoma of dogs." The Journal of medical research. 18(3): 385.
- Beebe, S. P. (1911). Present Knowledge of Thyroid Function. Journal of the American Medical Association. 56(9): 658–660.
- Beebe, S. P. (1915). The serum treatment of hyperthyroidism. Journal of the American Medical Association. 64(5): 413–422.
- Beebe, S. P. (1921). Iodine in the treatment of goiter. Med. Rec. (99): 996–999.
