= Jewish Maternity Hospital =

- Location within New York City Location within New York

Geography
- Location: 270–272 East Broadway, Manhattan, New York City, New York, United States
- Coordinates: 40.7149379°N 73.9849904°W

Organization
- Type: Specialist
- Religious affiliation: Jewish

Services
- Speciality: obstetrics

History
- Founded: 1906
- Closed: 1931
- Demolished: building repurposed as an old age home

Links
- Lists: Hospitals in New York State
- Other links: Hospitals in Manhattan

Jewish Maternity Hospital was an obstetrics hospital located at 270–272 East Broadway, on the Lower East Side of Manhattan, New York City.

== History ==
Jewish Maternity Hospital was chartered in 1906 and opened on February 15, 1909. It catered to the Jewish residents of the Lower East Side, who were the overwhelmingly predominant local population at the time, although expectant mothers of any religion were accepted.

In its first 20 years of operation, 31,295 babies were born at Jewish Maternity Hospital.

The hospital merged administratively with Beth Israel Hospital on December 19, 1929. Beth Israel was in financial straits because of cost overruns on a new building under construction at Stuyvesant Square, and Jewish Maternity Hospital had money available for their own construction plans. When Beth Israel finished their construction in 1931, Jewish Maternity Hospital also moved to the site. Both institutions’ names were kept for some time after the merger, but the Jewish Maternity Hospital name was eventually replaced by the Beth Israel name for all obstetrical services.

== Births of people who became notable ==
- Jerome Robbins (1918–1998) – choreographer, director, dancer, and theater producer

== Legacy ==
The building on the Lower East Side continued to be used for outpatient services, and was sold in 1943 to the Home of the Sages of Israel, a retirement home for rabbis located next door to the former hospital building. The structures were then combined and remodeled into an expanded retirement home.

The successor maternity services at Beth Israel Hospital continued to operate for several decades, but were closed on June 11, 2017, as part of that hospital's downsizing.
