= Midtown Hospital (Manhattan) =

Defunct hospital in New York City

Coordinates: 40°45′15″N 73°58′5″W

Midtown Hospital was a non-profit hospital at 309 E. 49th Street in Turtle Bay, Manhattan, New York City. The hospital's origins began as a free public health clinic founded by Edward J. Bermingham in 1891. It was incorporated in 1893 as the New York Throat and Nose Hospital. In 1894 the hospital opened facilities at 249 E. 59th St in Midtown East. In 1899 it was renamed the New York Throat, Nose, and Lung Hospital. In 1905 it moved to new premises at 229 and 231 E. 57th Street. In 1923 its name was changed to Midtown Hospital, and in 1929 it moved to its final location on 49th Street. By December 1978 the hospital had closed and had been subsumed into New York University's Medical Research Center (now NYU Langone Health).

== History ==
=== New York Throat and Nose Hospital ===
The New York Throat and Nose Hospital (NYTNH) was officially incorporated on October 7, 1893 with Dr. Edward J. Bermingham (1853–1922) serving as its first chief physician. Beringham had earlier founded the Archives of Clinical Surgery, the first surgical journal in the United States, in 1876. The origins of the NYTNH dated back to 1891 when the organization was originally organized under Bermingham's leadership as a free public health clinic in partnership with the New York City Board of Health. The clinic was opened in March 1892 at 833 Third Avenue in Manhattan. It was open to "all people, irrespective of creed, color, or nationality". In the year prior to the founding of the hospital, the clinic serviced more than 10,000 patients; a volume which necessitated expanding into larger facilities which led to the establishment of the NYTNH. Dr. Sam Goldstein, a nose, throat and ear specialist, was also an important physician that assisted in the founding of the hospital.

The original building of the NYTNH was located in Manhattan at 249 E. 59th St.; a property which was purchased in May 1894. Funds to build the hospital were partially raised by the Ladies' Auxiliary of the New York Throat and Nose Hospital, a women's charity organization who held a three day long fundraising event at Sherry's in December 1893 and again in December 1894. Leaders involved in these fundraising events included Anna Paulina Sands (aka Mrs. Edward Payson Roe), Amelia Edith Huddleston Barr and the wife of Alfred Holland Smith, the President of New York Central Railroad, among other society women in New York. The actress Lillian Russell donated tickets for box seats at the Abbey Theatre which were auctioned off at the 1894 fair. The Ladies' Auxiliary continued to hold annual fund raisers during the early years of the hospital's history at venues like Waldorf Astoria New York.

=== New York Throat, Nose, and Lung Hospital ===
The NYTNH changed its name to the New York Throat, Nose, and Lung Hospital (NYTNLH) in 1899. In 1904 the hospital opened a special dispensary for patients with tuberculosis. In 1905 the hospital moved to new premises at 229 and 231 E. 57th Street. By 1906 the hospital had expanded its departments to include not just the treatment of diseases for throat, nose, and lung, but also eyes, ears, and dental departments. It was still providing all its treatments for free at this time. Around this time a special free dental clinic for children was established with approximately a dozen dentists employed in that practice, and in 1907 the clinic founded a program to provide free eye glasses to children needing vision correction. In 1908 the hospital expanded its hours to be open at night in order to meet the needs of the working poor.

In March 1909 opera singer Emma Calvé performed a benefit concert for the NYTNLH with conductor Victor Harris and his orchestra at the William A. Salomon mansion. It was given to an audience that included New York governor Charles Evans Hughes, New York City mayor George B. McClellan Jr., conductor Walter Damrosch, and socialites Edith Kingdon and Anne Harriman Vanderbilt among other New York elite. In April 1909 the Jewish congregation Chebra Kadusha Talmud Torah sold its three story building at No. 233 E. 57th St to the NYTNLH. Architect Patrick F. Brogan was hired to remodel the building to expand the facilities of the hospital.

In October 1909 the hospital expanded its tuberculosis clinic to included overnight patients. At the time that the tuberculosis annex opened New York banker Henry D. Brewster was president of the hospital and philanthropist John Daniel Crimmins was vice president with Edward J. Bermingham now holding the title of Suregeon-in-Chief. The annex contained 50 hospital beds, of which 44 were reserved for men and only 6 made available to women and children with an additional five beds for babies. It also contained an x-ray machine and other medical equipment of the era. It was named the Emma Calvé Ward. Individuals who gave money to build the clinic included opera singers Geraldine Farrar and Lillian Nordica; industrialist Benjamin Newton Duke; newspaper publisher Frank Munsey; politician Paul Morton; tobacco magnate and financier Thomas Fortune Ryan; financier August Belmont Jr.; lawyer Paul Drennan Cravath; and philanthropist William Kissam Vanderbilt II among others. It opened November 3, 1909

Composer and director Kenneth Webb created a two act musical, King Karl Kronstadt, which was premiered as a fund raiser for the NYTNLH in the ballroom of the Plaza Hotel in 1912. In 1914 baritone Wilfrid Douthitt gave a benefit recital at Aeolian Hall for the NYTNLH. In 1916 the hospital was involved in helping to treat the 1916 New York City polio epidemic with Bermingham serving as a spokesman for New York's health department. Dr. Bermingham was as the center of a controversy in the medical community over a new treatment used in polio patients which involved injections of adrenaline and urotropin.

A 1917 article in the New York Herald reported that the hospital was struggling financially during World War I; largely because charitable giving was down and expenses were simultaneously rising. In February 1922 the hospital purchased an adjoining property 227 E. 57th St. The following July, Dr. Bermingham died; having never retired from his position as the hospital's lead physician. During his career he was twice elected the president of both the New York Academy of Medicine and the New York Society of Medical Jurisprudence.

=== Midtown Hospital ===
In June 1923 the NYTNLH unsuccessfully sought to change its name to New York General Hospital which was denied by Public Welfare Commissioner Bird Sim Coler. However, the hospital was successful in renewing its license for all general medical and surgical cases. The hospital was renamed Midtown Hospital (MH) on July 10, 1923. In 1929 the MH moved to a brand new six story building at 309 E. 49th Street. The sale of its property on 57th st had been approved by New York Supreme Court judge Edward J. McGoldrick a year earlier. The old hospital on 57th st was demolished in 1930 to make way for the construction of apartment buildings.

The new hospital plant for MH was designed by Charles Butler, Clarence S. Stein and Frank E. Vitola of Charles Butler & Associates. It opened in September 1929 with greatly expanded facilities for X-Ray and other technology from its prior facilities. It had 61 hospital bed for in-patient care, a general surgery bay, and out-patient clinics for asthma, hay fever, gastro-intestinal, genito-urinary and gynecological care. It also had clinics for nose, throat, ear, and eye, and a dentistry practice. The building of this new facility was largely due to the support of George A. Helme, former president of both the Helme Tobacco Company and the American Snuff Company, who was president of the MH's board of directors and was a significant financial backer to the project in addition to playing a leadership role in the development end of the building the new hospital.

Dr. Edward S. Pope was executive surgeon and head of the MH during the 1930s until his death in 1942. MH added an obstetrical department in 1933 for low-income pregnant women. By 1935 the MH was a member of the Associated Hospital Service of New York. William J. A. Beck was president of the MH's executive board from 1942–1944.

Peter Pirnie Jr. was elected president of the hospital in 1953, and Herman C. Nolen was elected president of the hospital in 1963. Dr. Roland L. Maier was director of surgery and president of the medical board of MH at the time of his death in 1968. In 1977 the MH was under review by the New York County Health Services Review Organization in a group of hospitals that also included New York University Medical Center (NYUMC) at 560 First Avenue. By December 1978 the hospital had closed and had been subsumed into NYUMC (now NYU Langone Health).
