= Anna Lukens =

American physician

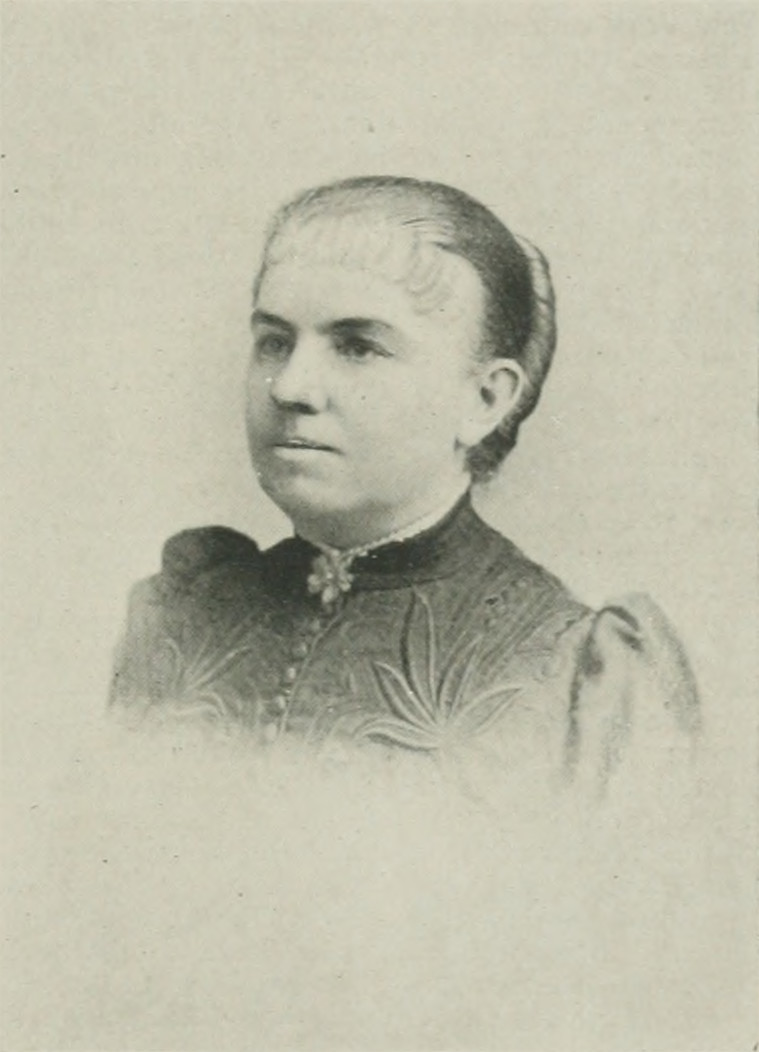
- Born: October 29, 1844; Philadelphia, Pennsylvania, U.S.
- Died: June 27, 1917 (aged 72)
- Burial place: Laurel Hill Cemetery, Philadelphia, Pennsylvania, U.S.
- Occupations: Physician, Medical Educator

Anna Lukens (October 29, 1844 – June 27, 1917) was an American physician from Philadelphia, Pennsylvania who practiced medicine, had leadership roles in hospitals and taught medicine. She was a vice-president of the New York Committee for the Prevention and State Regulation of Vice.

== Early life and education ==
Lukens was born in Philadelphia on October 29, 1844. Between 1855 and 1870, her family were residents of Plymouth, Pennsylvania, and belonged to the Society of Friends. She was educated in Philadelphia at the Friends' Seminary.

Lukens studied at the Woman's Medical College of Pennsylvania under Dr. Hiram Corson beginning in 1867 and graduated from the school on March 13, 1870. While attending clinics in the Pennsylvania Hospital in November 1869, the first time women students attended the hospital, she and Anna Broomall led a line of women students out of the hospital grounds amid hisses, jeers, insults, and thrown stones and mud from male students.

== Career ==
In 1870, Lukens entered the Woman's Hospital of Philadelphia as an intern. In May of that year, she became the first female member of one of the medical societies in the states when she became an elected member of the Montgomery County Medical Society. The following year, she began to teach at the college as an instructor in the chair of physiology.

In 1872, Lukens taught pharmacy in the college by lectures and practical demonstrations in the dispensary of the Women's Hospital. She was the first woman to apply for admission to the Philadelphia College of Pharmacy, but discouraged by the reception there, she studied analytical chemistry in the laboratory of Dr. Walls at the College of Pharmacy in New York City.

Lukens became an attending physician of the Western Dispensary for Women and Children in 1873, and in some instances paid the rent for this dispensary using her personal money. The same year, she was elected a member of the New York County Medical Society.

In 1877, Lukens was appointed assistant physician in the Nursery and Child's Hospital of Staten Island, assuming responsibility of the pharmaceutical department. She became appointed resident physician of the hospital in 1880.

Two papers which Lukens read before the Staten Island Clinical Society were published in the New York Journal, copied in the London Lancet and received favorable notice by the British Medical Journal. In 1884, she went abroad to study children's diseases in the principal hospitals of Europe. She later opened an office for private practice in the city of New York and was then elected consulting physician of the Nursery and Child's Hospital of Staten Island, and a fellow of the New York State Medical Society. She was appointed in 1876, one of the vice-presidents of the New York Committee for the Prevention and State Regulation of Vice.

Lukens was a member of the Sorosis Club and was considered a woman of marked executive ability for hospital administration. In The Part Taken by Women in American History (1912), it was said that "Her work is of a high standard and she occupied a conspicuous position for a woman in the profession which she has chosen."

Aside from articles that Lukens wrote for the New York Medical Journal, she wrote the book The History of Nursery and Child's Hospital, New York, which was published in 1893.

== Personal life ==
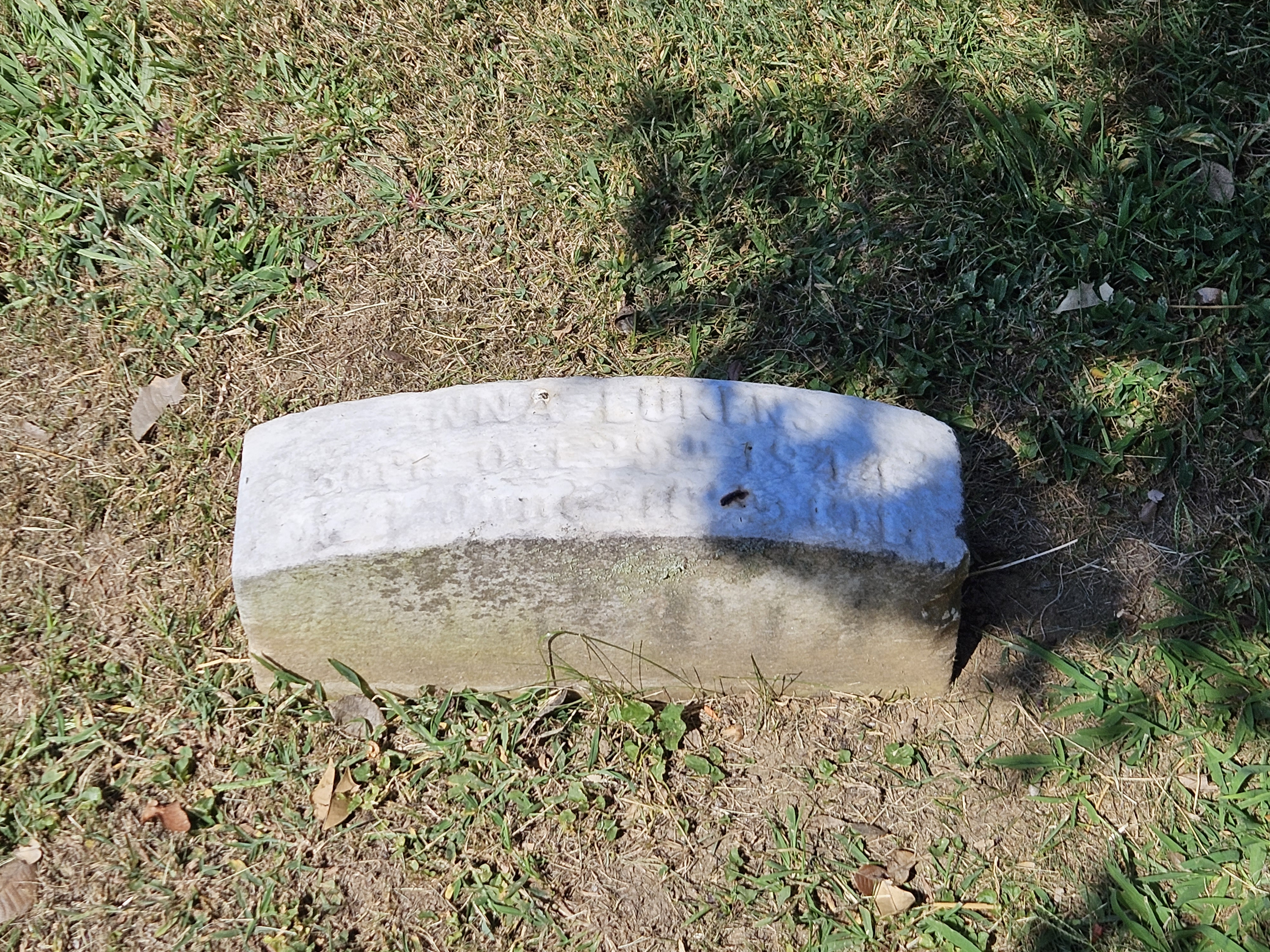
Anna Lukens gravestone in Laurel Hill Cemetery

Lukens had a farm in Pennsylvania, an apartment in New York, and a winter home called "Sequoia Lodge by the Sea" in Pacific Grove, California, which was built in 1906 by Emily Williams. She shared her homes with her companion, Mary Conrad.

Lukens died on June 16, 1917, and was interred at Laurel Hill Cemetery in Philadelphia.
