= Helena Justa =

American dancer

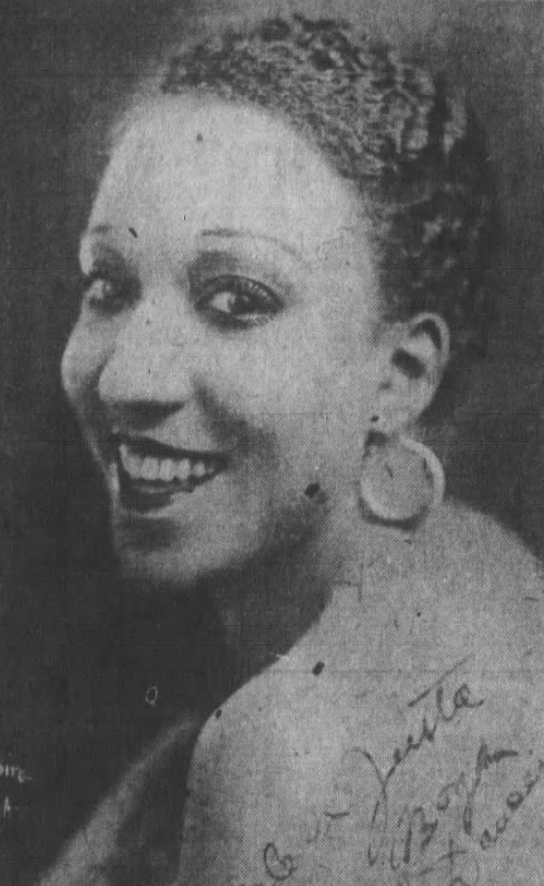
- Helena Justa, from a 1930 newspaper
- Born: Helena Johnson; December 21, 1901; Brooklyn, New York, U.S.
- Died: after 1964
- Other name: Helena Justa de Armas
- Occupations: Dancer, singer, vaudeville performer

Helena Justa (December 21, 1901 – after 1964), born Helena Johnson, was an American dancer and singer active in the 1920s and 1930s, billed as "the female Bill Robinson".

== Early life ==
Justa was born in Brooklyn, New York, the daughter vaudeville entertainers Duke Johnson and Mae Wells. She traveled with her parents in Europe, Australia and New Zealand while they toured in the 1900s and 1910s.

== Career ==
Justa performed on vaudeville programs beginning in her teens. "Miss Justa is a versatile dancer, the esthetic, clog and toe all being in the range of her accomplishments," noted The Chicago Defender in 1926. However, a Billboard review in 1932 found her singing "decidedly ordinary".

Justa danced in Massachusetts in 1923 and 1924, in Pennsylvania in 1925, and in California in 1926 and 1927. She sang in California and Chicago in 1928, and danced with Bill Robinson in Blackbirds of 1929. In 1929 and 1930 she danced and sang with her uncle Charlie Johnson, on the RKO circuit. In the 1930s she led her own revue, the Harlem Maniacs, and had a cabaret act. Pianist Gideon Honore worked with her in 1935. In 1936, she and Etta Moten performed in Buenos Aires.

Justa married her manager, Ted Bradley, but left him in 1935. She occasionally performed in clubs in her later years.
