= James Ewing Hospital =

Former hospital in Manhattan, New York

Coordinates: 40°45′53.4″N 73°57′28.1″W

James Ewing Hospital was a 300-bed Manhattan hospital notable for helping cancer patients. The hospital opened in August of 1950 and later in 1968, Memorial Sloan Kettering took over running the hospital.

== History ==
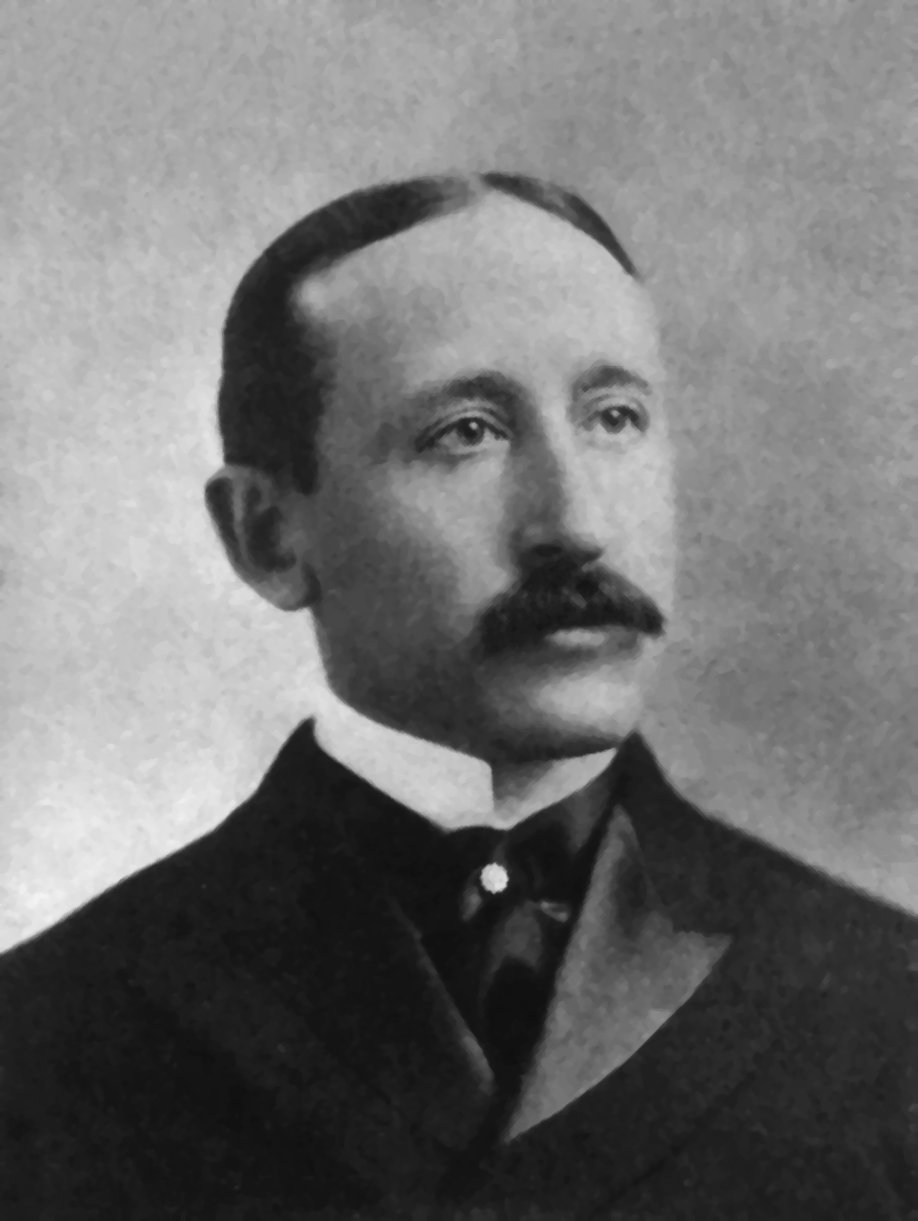
Pathologist James Ewing (1866-1943), Cancer research pioneer, after whom the hospital was named.

Ewing's predecessor was "City Cancer Hospital on Welfare Island;" the First Avenue location opened in 1950.

The Ewing building was a "ten-story structure on First Avenue, between Sixty-seventh and Sixty-eighth Streets" and James Ewing Hospital was "an affiliate of Memorial Center for Cancer and Allied Diseases." an earlier name of Memorial Sloan Kettering. The opening of the hospital happened on August 22, 1950 with 300 beds. In 1950, this was a "modern" hospital and named after James Ewing in honor of his cancer research.

=== Founder ===
In 1899 Ewing was appointed as the first professor of pathology at the Medical College of Cornell University. There, Ewing had access to the research laboratories at the New York Memorial Hospital, now known as the Memorial Sloan-Kettering Cancer Center. From there, Ewings research and findings lead him his experimental findings on cancers.

The hospital was named after Dr. James Ewing (1866-1943), who had pioneered in cancer research and was featured on the cover of a 1931 Time Magazine issue as "Cancer Man Ewing." The hospital building, 1250 First Avenue in Manhattan, today is Memorial Sloan Ketterings's Arnold and Marie Schwartz Cancer Research Building.
