= Manhattan General Hospital =

Defunct hospital in Manhattan, New York

Coordinates: 40.778°N 73.977°W

Geography
- Location: Manhattan, New York, United States

History
- Opened: 1925
- Closed: 1964 (merger)

Links
- Lists: Hospitals in New York State
- Other links: List of hospitals in Manhattan

Manhattan General Hospital is a defunct hospital that also used the name Manhattan Hospital and relocated more than once, using buildings that serially served more than one hospital, beginning in the 1920s.

== History ==
Alfred A. Richman, who had opened a "private sanitarium at 50 West Seventy-fourth Street" in 1925, subsequently "founded Manhattan General Hospital". The hospital was at one point located at Second Avenue and 18th Street in Manhattan, New York City; that building was once used by the Lying-in Hospital. Later the hospital moved to 161 East 90th Street on the Upper East Side of Manhattan in New York City.

The first occupant of 161 East 90th Street was Pan American Hospital, which was intended "to serve the Latin-American people through their own Spanish and Portuguese-speaking doctors and nurses." Creation of the hospital was encouraged by William Sharpe, "the first president of the Pan-American Medical Association." In less than two years after opening, Pan American Hospital was in court regarding whether or not they would be able to continue operation. The New York Times editorialized that Pan American Hospital "should be continued" since "through no fault of its own management" the hospital faced financial problems. It closed in 1930.

Afterward, Manhattan General occupied the 9-story building at 161 East 90th Street until 1934, when the building was sold to Beth David Hospital. Beth David also bought an adjacent site to construct an 11-story building. The roots of Beth David Hospital can be traced to the incorporation on November 29, 1886, of the Yorkville Dispensary for Women and Children, located at 246-248 East 82nd Street. In 1912 they moved to 1822-1828 Lexington Avenue and 113th Street. Beth David Hospital celebrated for an entire week in June 1913 after having moved to a newly built facility. In 1934 Beth David purchased the 161 East 90th Street building. Beth David stayed at the location until 1957, when it relocated to 321 East 42nd Street. Beth David was renamed to Grand Central Hospital on July 3, 1959, before closing by mid-1963.

Manhattan General merged with Mount Sinai Beth Israel in 1964 and closed; the MGH buildings became co-op apartments.
