= Jewish Memorial Hospital =

Defunct Manhattan hospital

Coordinates: 40.861°N 73.930°W

Geography
- Location: Inwood, Manhattan, New York, United States

Services
- Beds: 186

History
- Opened: 1934
- Closed: 1982

Links
- Lists: Hospitals in New York State
- Other links: List of hospitals in Manhattan

Jewish Memorial Hospital was a former hospital in New York City. It opened 1898 and subsequently relocated twice. The hospital permanently closed in 1982.

== History ==
The 1934-built eight-story 186-bed Inwood, Manhattan hospital, like its earlier 1923 location, was planned as a "commemoration of Jewish veterans of World War I."

The Inwood building was opened in 1934 and expanded in 1959. In 1981 the Jewish Memorial Hospital was part of a three-hospital neighborhood primary care coalition described as novel and unique. In 1982, oversight agencies, after weighing reports that the hospital had serious "deficiencies" and recognition that it "serves a large minority community" forced it to close. An aftereffect of this closure, along with 30 others "in the last seven years" is an observation that it's "harder to get a sick patient into a decent hospital without dangerous delay."
