= U. Conrad Vincent =

American physician

Dr. U. Conrad Vincent was an American physician.

Vincent graduated from the University of Pennsylvania Medical School in 1917. He applied for and was initially rejected for an internship at Bellevue Hospital; however, Mayor John Hylan requested that his application be reconsidered, and he then became the first African American intern at the hospital. He became a urological surgeon and founded the Vincent Sanitarium and Hospital in Harlem in 1929.
