= William Morris Jr. =

American talent agent

- Born: William Morris Jr. October 22, 1899
- Died: November 3, 1989 (age 90); Malibu, California, United States
- Occupation: Talent agent
- Known for: President of the William Morris Agency
- Parent: William Morris Sr.

William Morris Jr. (October 22, 1899 – November 3, 1989) was an American talent agent and former president of the William Morris Agency.

== Biography ==
William Morris Jr. is the son of Emma (née Belinghoff) and William Morris Sr. His mother was a German Protestant; and his father a Jewish immigrant from Germany. In 1898, his father founded the William Morris Agency which represented Vaudeville artists. In 1918, he went to work for his father's firm and helped to diversify the agency into radio and film as the industry changed. In 1930, he moved to Los Angeles to the heart of the film industry and the firm became the first agency to represent both performers and writers. In 1932, he became president after his father died. In 1949, the William Morris Agency attained further industry dominance with the acquisition of the Berg-Allenberg Agency, then the largest merger in the talent agency business. He served as its president until 1952 and as a director until 1969. Under his tutelage, the William Morris Agency became one of the world's largest talent agencies.

He served as a vice chairman on the National Council of American-Soviet Friendship. In 1948, after the Council sponsored a dinner with Russian foreign minister Andrei Vishinsky, it was placed by Attorney General Tom C. Clark on his list of subversive organizations and Morris was deemed to be "very friendly to Communist writers and exceedingly unfriendly to anti-Communist writers."

== Personal life ==
Morris divorced his wife Jerry. He later married Ruth Ruben (née Bachmann). He died in 1989 in Malibu, California.
