= Wadsworth Hospital =

Defunct Manhattan hospital, now medical offices

Geography
- Location: 629 West 185th Street, Washington Heights, Manhattan, New York, United States
- Coordinates: 40°51′7.99″N 73°55′57.91″W

Organization
- Care system: Private
- Type: General

Services
- Beds: 50

History
- Opened: 1929
- Closed: 1976

Links
- Lists: Hospitals in New York State
- Other links: Hospitals in Manhattan

Wadsworth Hospital was a 50-bed private hospital that closed in 1976, after being cited by Federal, State and New York City oversight agencies, and subsequently losing funding.

== History ==
This five-story Washington Heights hospital agreed in April 1976, after pressure from oversight agencies, to close. The 1929-built structure had one serious violation: a "single front door, which is the only exit from the upper floors" (which the hospital refused to remedy: "contended that putting in another exit would mean cutting down on the number of beds").

The location, 629 West 185th Street, became a medical office building.

=== Loss of funding ===
Wadsworth, "where the most-frequent procedure was abortion," was one of three in a series of hospitals closed in the mid-1970s for "life-threatening fire and health violations." Initially they each lost certification, then they lost funding. As a result, it was "economically unfeasible for the hospital to stay in business."

== See also ==
- List of hospitals in Manhattan
