= Northwestern Dispensary =

Defunct New York City hospital

The Northwestern Dispensary was "founded under the auspices of the 'New York Association for Improving the Condition of the Poor'" in 1852. Their first location was 511 Eight Avenue. Funding for construction of a second building was part of the city budget. Its location was Ninth Avenue and 36th Street.

Like other dispensaries, one purpose was "to promptly, without charge .. every five years" vaccinate all residents of New York City against smallpox. Funding was specifically given to this dispensary.

== Censured ==
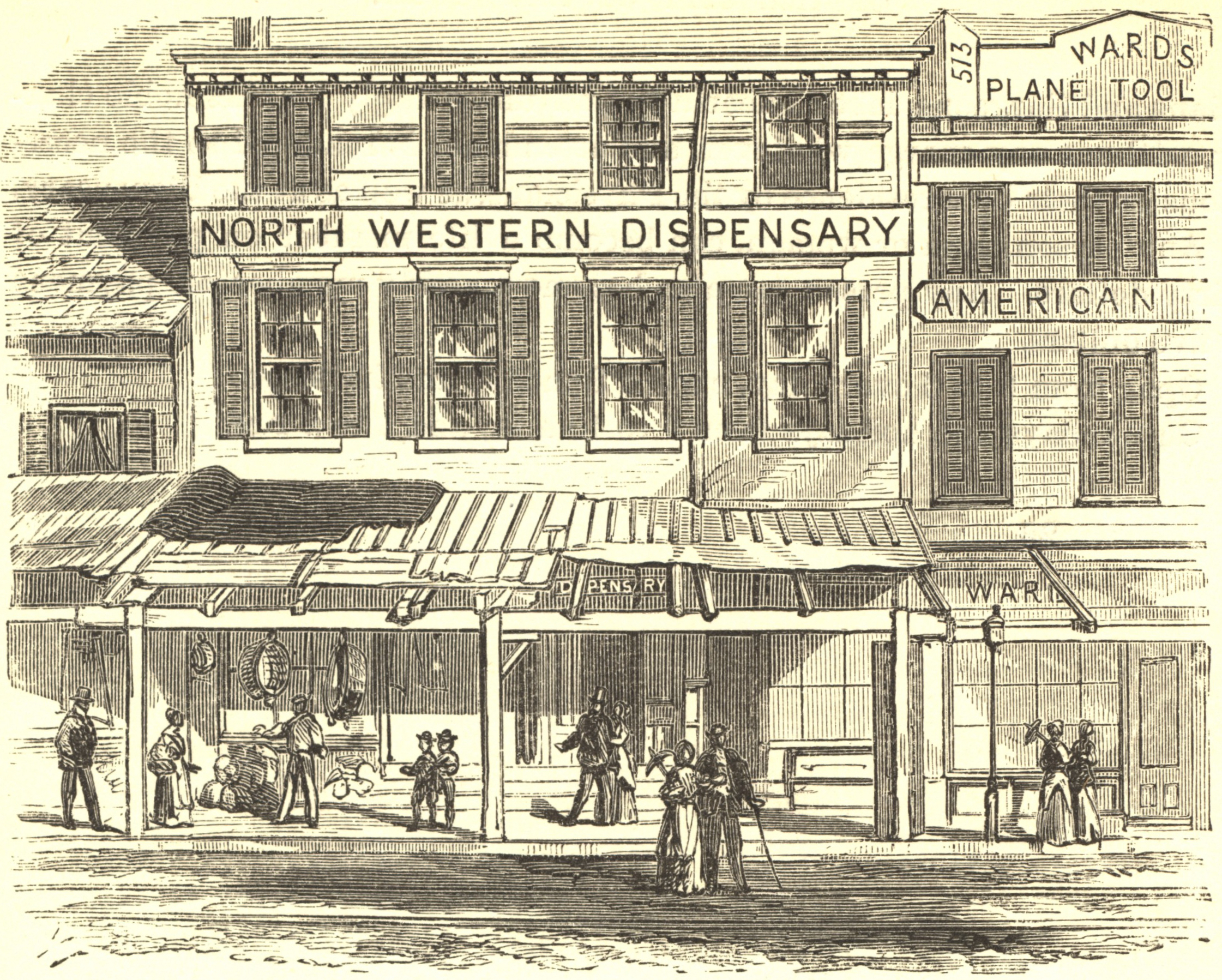
Northwestern Dispensary, (Incorporated 1852). Ninth Avenue, corner Thirty-sixth Street, Manhattan

The purpose of the hospital was to deal with the poor, yet "that they had no money" was the reason a doctor was not sent to deal with an age 60 immigrant who died for lack of medical attention. The result was a jury verdict of "we censure the physicians of the Northwestern Dispensary, for their culpable negligence in not answering the call made upon them to attend the patient."

== See also ==
- List of hospitals in Manhattan
