= Edward J. McGoldrick =

New York Supreme Court judge

Edward J. McGoldrick (June 9, 1871 – 1951) was a New York Supreme Court judge. he was a member of the state supreme court for 23 years. He also served as a New York State Supreme Court Justice for New York City and The Bronx and did legal work for four New York City mayoral administration. He was appointed to the Supreme Court by governor Al Smith. His high-profile cases included Helen Kane's suit against the creators of Betty Boop.

He was nominated in 1920 to fill Philip Henry Dugro's seat on the New York Supreme Court. In 1922, he succeeded Judge Bartow S. Weeks on the Supreme Court of the State of New York.

McGoldrick was born in Albany. He served as private secretary to Lieutenant Governor William F. Sheehan.

A Democrat, he was affiliated with Tammany Hall.
