= List of animated short films of the 1930s =

Films are sorted by year and then alphabetically. They include theatrical, television, and direct-to-video films with less than 40 minutes runtime. For a list of films with over 40 minutes of runtime, see List of animated feature films before 1940.

== 1930 ==
Name	Country	Technique
Accordion Joe	United States	Traditional Animation
Africa	United States	Traditional Animation
Alaska	United States	Traditional Animation
Alaskan Knights	United States	Traditional Animation
The Apache Kid	United States	Traditional Animation
Arctic Antics	United States	Traditional Animation
Autumn	United States	Traditional Animation
The Bandmaster	United States	Traditional Animation
Barnacle Bill	United States	Traditional Animation
The Barnyard Concert	United States	Traditional Animation
Bedelia	United States	Traditional Animation
The Booze Hangs High	United States	Traditional Animation
Bowery Bimbos	United States	Traditional Animation
Box Car Blues	United States	Traditional Animation
Broadway Folly	United States	Traditional Animation
Bully Beef	United States	Traditional Animation
The Cactus Kid	United States	Traditional Animation
Cannibal Capers	United States	Traditional Animation
Caviar	United States	Traditional Animation
The Chain Gang	United States	Traditional Animation
Chilly Con Carmen	United States	Traditional Animation
Chop Suey	United States	Traditional Animation
Circus Capers	United States	Traditional Animation
Codfish Balls	United States	Traditional Animation
Cold Feet	United States	Traditional Animation
Come Take a Trip in My Airship	United States	Traditional Animation
Congo Jazz	United States	Traditional Animation
The Cuckoo Murder Case	United States	Traditional Animation
The Detective	United States	Traditional Animation
Dixie Days	United States	Traditional Animation
Dizzy Dishes	United States	Traditional Animation
Dutch Treat	United States	Traditional Animation
Fiddlesticks	United States	Traditional Animation
Fiddlin' Around	United States	Traditional Animation
Fire Bugs	United States	Traditional Animation
The Fire Fighters	United States	Traditional Animation
Flying Fists	United States	Traditional Animation
The Fowl Ball	United States	Traditional Animation
French Fried	United States	Traditional Animation
Fried Chicken	United States	Traditional Animation
Frolicking Fish	United States	Traditional Animation
The Glow-Worm	United States	Traditional Animation
Golf Nuts	United States	Traditional Animation
Good Old Schooldays	United States	Traditional Animation
The Gorilla Mystery	United States	Traditional Animation
Grand Uproar	United States	Traditional Animation
Gypped in Egypt	United States	Traditional Animation
The Hash Shop	United States	Traditional Animation
Hawaiian Pineapples	United States	Traditional Animation
Hells Heels	United States	Traditional Animation
Henpecked	United States	Traditional Animation
Hold Anything	United States	Traditional Animation
Hot Dog	United States	Traditional Animation
Hot for Hollywood	United States	Traditional Animation
Hot Tamale	United States	Traditional Animation
A Hot Time in the Old Town Tonight	United States	Traditional Animation
Hot Turkey	United States	Traditional Animation
Hungarian Goulash	United States	Traditional Animation
I'm Afraid to Come Home in the Dark	United States	Traditional Animation
I'm Forever Blowing Bubbles	United States	Traditional Animation
In the Good Old Summer Time	United States	Traditional Animation
In the Shade of the Old Apple Tree	United States	Traditional Animation
Indian Pudding	United States	Traditional Animation
Irish Stew	United States	Traditional Animation
The Iron Man	United States	Traditional Animation
Jazz Rhythm	United States	Traditional Animation
Jumping Beans	United States	Traditional Animation
Just Mickey	United States	Traditional Animation
Kangaroo Steak	United States	Traditional Animation
Kisses and Kurses	United States	Traditional Animation
Kounty Fair	United States	Traditional Animation
La Paloma	United States	Traditional Animation
Laundry Blues	United States	Traditional Animation
Little Orphan Willie	United States	Traditional Animation
Mariutch	United States	Traditional Animation
Marriage Wows	United States	Traditional Animation
Mars	United States	Traditional Animation
Mexico	United States	Traditional Animation
Midnight in a Toy Shop	United States	Traditional Animation
Monkey Meat	United States	Traditional Animation
Monkey Melodies	United States	Traditional Animation
My Gal Sal	United States	Traditional Animation
My Pal Paul	United States	Traditional Animation
Mysterious Mose	United States	Traditional Animation
The Navy	United States	Traditional Animation
Night	United States	Traditional Animation
Not So Quiet	United States	Traditional Animation
The Office Boy	United States	Traditional Animation
On a Sunday Afternoon	United States	Traditional Animation
The Picnic	United States	Traditional Animation
Pigskin Capers	United States	Traditional Animation
Pioneer Days	United States	Traditional Animation
Playful Pan	United States	Traditional Animation
Pretzels	United States	Traditional Animation
The Prison Panic	United States	Traditional Animation
The Prisoner's Song	United States	Traditional Animation
Puddle Pranks	United States	Traditional Animation
Radio Riot	United States	Traditional Animation
Roman Punch	United States	Traditional Animation
Row, Row, Row	United States	Traditional Animation
Salt Water Taffy	United States	Traditional Animation
Scotch Highball	United States	Traditional Animation
The Shindig	United States	Traditional Animation
The Showman	United States	Traditional Animation
The Singing Sap	United States	Traditional Animation
Singing Saps	United States	Traditional Animation
Sinkin' in the Bathtub	United States	Traditional Animation
Sky Scraping	United States	Traditional Animation
Slow Beau	United States	Traditional Animation
Snappy Salesman	United States	Traditional Animation
Spanish Onions	United States	Traditional Animation
Spooks	United States	Traditional Animation
The Stein Song	United States	Traditional Animation
Stone Age Stunts	United States	Traditional Animation
Strike Up the Band	United States	Traditional Animation
Summer	United States	Traditional Animation
Swing You Sinners!	United States	Traditional Animation
Swiss Cheese	United States	Traditional Animation
Tramping Tramps	United States	Traditional Animation
Up to Mars	United States	Traditional Animation
The Village Barber	United States	Traditional Animation
Western Whoopee	United States	Traditional Animation
Winter	United States	Traditional Animation
Wise Flies	United States	Traditional Animation
Yes! We Have No Bananas	United States	Traditional Animation

== 1931 ==
Name	Country	Technique
Adventures of Juku the Dog	Estonia	Traditional Animation
Africa Squeaks	United States	Traditional Animation
Ain't Nature Grand!	United States	Traditional Animation
Aladdin's Lamp	United States	Traditional Animation
Alexander's Ragtime Band	United States	Traditional Animation
And the Green Grass Grew All Around	United States	Traditional Animation
Any Little Girl That's a Nice Little Girl	United States	Traditional Animation
The Bandmaster	United States	Traditional Animation
Bars and Stripes	United States	Traditional Animation
Betty Co-ed	United States	Traditional Animation
Big Man from the North	United States	Traditional Animation
Bimbo's Initiation	United States	Traditional Animation
The Bird Store	United States	Traditional Animation
Birds of a Feather	United States	Traditional Animation
The Birthday Party	United States	Traditional Animation
Blue Rhythm	United States	Traditional Animation
Bosko Shipwrecked!	United States	Traditional Animation
Bosko the Doughboy	United States	Traditional Animation
Bosko's Soda Fountain	United States	Traditional Animation
Bosko's Fox Hunt	United States	Traditional Animation
Bosko's Holiday	United States	Traditional Animation
The Bum Bandit	United States	Traditional Animation
The Busy Beavers	United States	Traditional Animation
By the Beautiful Sea	United States	Traditional Animation
By the Light of the Silvery Moon	United States	Traditional Animation
Canadian Capers	United States	Traditional Animation
The Castaway	United States	Traditional Animation
The Cat's Out	United States	Traditional Animation
The Champ	United States	Traditional Animation
China	United States	Traditional Animation
The China Plate	United States	Traditional Animation
Cinderella Blues	United States	Traditional Animation
The Clock Store	United States	Traditional Animation
The Clown	United States	Traditional Animation
Club Sandwich	United States	Traditional Animation
College	United States	Traditional Animation
College Capers	United States	Traditional Animation
Country School	United States	Traditional Animation
Cowboy Blues	United States	Traditional Animation
The Delivery Boy	United States	Traditional Animation
Disarmament Conference	United States	Traditional Animation
Down South	United States	Traditional Animation
Dumb Patrol	United States	Traditional Animation
Egyptian Melodies	United States	Traditional Animation
The Explorer	United States	Traditional Animation
The Farmer	United States	Traditional Animation
The Fireman	United States	Traditional Animation
The Fisherman	United States	Traditional Animation
The Fox Hunt	United States	Traditional Animation
Hallowe'en	United States	Traditional Animation
The Hare Mail	United States	Traditional Animation
Hash House Blues	United States	Traditional Animation
Hittin' the Trail for Hallelujah Land	United States	Traditional Animation
Hot Feet	United States	Traditional Animation
The Hunter	United States	Traditional Animation
I Wonder Who's Kissing Her Now	United States	Traditional Animation
I'd Climb the Highest Mountain	United States	Traditional Animation
Jail Birds	United States	Traditional Animation
Jungle Jam	United States	Traditional Animation
Kentucky Belles	United States	Traditional Animation
Kitty from Kansas City	United States	Traditional Animation
Lady, Play Your Mandolin!	United States	Traditional Animation
Laughing Gas	United States	Traditional Animation
Little Annie Rooney	United States	Traditional Animation
Mickey's Orphans	United States	Traditional Animation
The Moose Hunt	United States	Traditional Animation
Mother Goose Melodies	United States	Traditional Animation
Movie Mad	United States	Traditional Animation
Mr. Gallagher and Mr. Shean	United States	Traditional Animation
My Baby Just Cares for Me	United States	Traditional Animation
My Wife's Gone to the Country	United States	Traditional Animation
The New Car	United States	Traditional Animation
Northwoods	United States	Traditional Animation
One More Time	United States	Traditional Animation
Please Go 'Way and Let Me Sleep	United States	Traditional Animation
Polar Pals	United States	Traditional Animation
Radio Rhythm	United States	Traditional Animation
Ragtime Romeo	United States	Traditional Animation
Razzberries	United States	Traditional Animation
Red-Headed Baby	United States	Traditional Animation
Rodeo Dough	United States	Traditional Animation
Russian Lullaby	United States	Traditional Animation
Shipwreck	United States	Traditional Animation
Smile, Darn Ya, Smile!	United States	Traditional Animation
Soda Poppa	United States	Traditional Animation
Somebody Stole My Gal	United States	Traditional Animation
The Soup Song	United States	Traditional Animation
The Spider and the Fly	United States	Traditional Animation
Spooks	United States	Traditional Animation
The Stone Age	United States	Traditional Animation
The Sultan's Cat	United States	Traditional Animation
Sunny South	United States	Traditional Animation
Svengarlic	United States	Traditional Animation
A Swiss Trick	United States	Traditional Animation
Taken for a Ride	United States	Traditional Animation
That Old Gang of Mine	United States	Traditional Animation
Toy Time	United States	Traditional Animation
Traffic Troubles	United States	Traditional Animation
The Tree's Knees	United States	Traditional Animation
Trouble	United States	Traditional Animation
The Ugly Duckling	United States	Traditional Animation
Ups 'n Downs	United States	Traditional Animation
The Village Smitty	United States	Traditional Animation
The Village Specialist	United States	Traditional Animation
Weenie Roast	United States	Traditional Animation
Wonderland	United States	Traditional Animation
Wot a Night	United States	Traditional Animation
Yelp Wanted	United States	Traditional Animation
Yodeling Yokels	United States	Traditional Animation
You Don't Know What You're Doin'!	United States	Traditional Animation
You're Driving Me Crazy	United States	Traditional Animation

== 1932 ==
Name	Country	Technique
Babes in the Woods	United States	Traditional Animation
Barnyard Olympics	United States	Traditional Animation
Battling Bosko	United States	Traditional Animation
The Bears and the Bees	United States	Traditional Animation
Beau and Arrows	United States	Traditional Animation
Betty Boop for President	United States	Traditional Animation
Betty Boop, M.D.	United States	Traditional Animation
Betty Boop's Bamboo Isle	United States	Traditional Animation
Betty Boop's Bizzy Bee	United States	Traditional Animation
Betty Boop's Museum	United States	Traditional Animation
Betty Boop's Ups and Downs	United States	Traditional Animation
The Bears and the Bees	United States	Traditional Animation
Big-Hearted Bosko	United States	Traditional Animation
Birth of Jazz	United States	Traditional Animation
Bosko and Bruno	United States	Traditional Animation
Bosko's Dizzy Date	United States	Traditional Animation
Bosko's Dog Race	United States	Traditional Animation
Bosko the Drawback	United States	Traditional Animation
Bosko at the Beach	United States	Traditional Animation
Bosko at the Zoo	United States	Traditional Animation
Bosko the Lumberjack	United States	Traditional Animation
Bosko's Store	United States	Traditional Animation
Bosko's Woodland Daze	United States	Traditional Animation
Bugs in Love	United States	Traditional Animation
The Bully	United States	Traditional Animation
The Busy Barber	United States	Traditional Animation
Carnival Capers	United States	Traditional Animation
Cat Nipped	United States	Traditional Animation
Circus	United States	Traditional Animation
The Crystal Gazebo	United States	Traditional Animation
Crosby, Columbo, and Vallee	United States	Traditional Animation
Day Nurse	United States	Traditional Animation
Down Among the Sugar Cane	United States	Traditional Animation
The Duck Hunt	United States	Traditional Animation
Farmer Al Falfa's Ape Girl	United States	Traditional Animation
Farmer Al Falfa's Bedtime Story	United States	Traditional Animation
Farmer Al Falfa's Birthday Party	United States	Traditional Animation
Fire-Fire	United States	Traditional Animation
Flowers and Trees	United States	Traditional Animation
Freddy the Freshman	United States	Traditional Animation
Funny Face	United States	Traditional Animation
A Great Big Bunch of You	United States	Traditional Animation
The Goal Rush	United States	Traditional Animation
Goopy Geer	United States	Traditional Animation
Grandma's Pet	United States	Traditional Animation
The Grocery Boy	United States	Traditional Animation
Hollywood Goes Krazy	United States	Traditional Animation
I Ain't Got Nobody	United States	Traditional Animation
I'll Be Glad When You're Dead You Rascal You	United States	Traditional Animation
I Love a Parade	United States	Traditional Animation
In the Bag	United States	Traditional Animation
It's Got Me Again!	United States	Traditional Animation
I Wish I Had Wings	United States	Traditional Animation
Joint Wipers	United States	Traditional Animation
Jolly Fish	United States	Traditional Animation
Jungle Jumble	United States	Traditional Animation
Just a Gigolo	United States	Traditional Animation
Just Dogs	United States	Traditional Animation
Just One More Chance	United States	Traditional Animation
King Neptune	United States	Traditional Animation
The Klondike Kid	United States	Traditional Animation
Let Me Call You Sweetheart	United States	Traditional Animation
Let's Eat	United States	Traditional Animation
The Mad Dog	United States	Traditional Animation
Making Good	United States	Traditional Animation
Mechanical Man	United States	Traditional Animation
Mickey in Arabia	United States	Traditional Animation
Mickey's Good Deed	United States	Traditional Animation
Mickey's Nightmare	United States	Traditional Animation
Mickey's Revue	United States	Traditional Animation
The Milkman	United States	Traditional Animation
Minnie the Moocher	United States	Traditional Animation
The Minstrel Show	United States	Traditional Animation
Moonlight for Two	United States	Traditional Animation
The Music Lesson	United States	Traditional Animation
Musical Farmer	United States	Traditional Animation
Noah's Outing	United States	Traditional Animation
Nurse Maid	United States	Traditional Animation
The Office Boy	United States	Traditional Animation
Oh! How I Hate to Get Up in the Morning	United States	Traditional Animation
Pagan Moon	United States	Traditional Animation
Pencil Mania	United States	Traditional Animation
Piano Mover	United States	Traditional Animation
Piano Tooners	United States	Traditional Animation
Plane Dumb	United States	Traditional Animation
The Pony Express	United States	Traditional Animation
Pots and Pans	United States	Traditional Animation
Prosperity Blues	United States	Traditional Animation
Puppy Love	United States	Traditional Animation
The Queen Was in the Parlor	United States	Traditional Animation
Rabid Hunters	United States	Traditional Animation
Redskin Blues	United States	Traditional Animation
Ride Him, Bosko!	United States	Traditional Animation
Ritzy Hotel	United States	Traditional Animation
Rocketeers	United States	Traditional Animation
Romantic Melodies	United States	Traditional Animation
Room Runners	United States	Traditional Animation
Rudy Vallee Melodies	United States	Traditional Animation
Santa's Workshop	United States	Traditional Animation
School Days (Flip the Frog)	United States	Traditional Animation
School Days (Screen Songs)	United States	Traditional Animation
Seeing Stars	United States	Traditional Animation
Shine On Harvest Moon	United States	Traditional Animation
Show Me the Way to Go Home	United States	Traditional Animation
Sing a Song	United States	Traditional Animation
Sleepy Time Down South	United States	Traditional Animation
Snow Time	United States	Traditional Animation
A Spanish Twist	United States	Traditional Animation
Spring Is Here	United States	Traditional Animation
Stopping the Show	United States	Traditional Animation
Stormy Seas	United States	Traditional Animation
Sweet Jennie Lee	United States	Traditional Animation
Teacher's Pests	United States	Traditional Animation
Three's a Crowd	United States	Traditional Animation
Time on My Hands	United States	Traditional Animation
You Try Somebody Else	United States	Traditional Animation
Touchdown Mickey	United States	Traditional Animation
Trader Mickey	United States	Traditional Animation
The Tuba Tooter	United States	Traditional Animation
Wait Till the Sun Shines, Nellie	United States	Traditional Animation
The Wayward Canary	United States	Traditional Animation
A Wet Knight	United States	Traditional Animation
What A Life	United States	Traditional Animation
When the Red, Red Robin Comes Bob, Bob, Bobbin' Along	United States	Traditional Animation
The Whoopee Party	United States	Traditional Animation
Wild and Woolly	United States	Traditional Animation
The Wild Goose Chase	United States	Traditional Animation
The Winged Horse	United States	Traditional Animation
Wins Out	United States	Traditional Animation
Woodland	United States	Traditional Animation
Ye Olde Songs	United States	Traditional Animation
You're Too Careless with Your Kisses!	United States	Traditional Animation

== 1933 ==
Name	Country	Technique
The Air Race	United States	Traditional Animation
Ain't She Sweet?	United States	Traditional Animation
Aloha Oe	United States	Traditional Animation
A.M. to P.M.	United States	Traditional Animation
Antique Antics	United States	Traditional Animation
The Banker's Daughter	United States	Traditional Animation
Beanstalk Jack	United States	Traditional Animation
Beau Best	United States	Traditional Animation
Beau Bosko	United States	Traditional Animation
Betty Boop's Big Boss	United States	Traditional Animation
Betty Boop's Birthday Party	United States	Traditional Animation
Betty Boop's Crazy Inventions	United States	Traditional Animation
Betty Boop's Hallowe'en Party	United States	Traditional Animation
Betty Boop's Ker-Choo	United States	Traditional Animation
Betty Boop's May Party	United States	Traditional Animation
Betty Boop's Penthouse	United States	Traditional Animation
The Bill Poster	United States	Traditional Animation
Birds in the Spring	United States	Traditional Animation
Blow Me Down!	United States	Traditional Animation
Boilesk	United States	Traditional Animation
Boo, Boo, Theme Song!	United States	Traditional Animation
Bosko in Dutch	United States	Traditional Animation
Bosko in Person	United States	Traditional Animation
Bosko the Musketeer	United States	Traditional Animation
Bosko the Sheep-Herder	United States	Traditional Animation
Bosko the Speed King	United States	Traditional Animation
Bosko's Knight-Mare	United States	Traditional Animation
Bosko's Mechanical Man	United States	Traditional Animation
Bosko's Picture Show	United States	Traditional Animation
The Broadway Malady	United States	Traditional Animation
Buddy's Beer Garden	United States	Traditional Animation
Buddy's Day Out	United States	Traditional Animation
Buddy's Show Boat	United States	Traditional Animation
Building a Building	United States	Traditional Animation
Bulloney	United States	Traditional Animation
Chikara to Onna no Yo no Naka	Japan	Anime
A Chinaman's Chance	United States	Traditional Animation
Cinderella	United States	Traditional Animation
Confidence	United States	Traditional Animation
Coo Coo the Magician	United States	Traditional Animation
Davy Jones' Locker	United States	Traditional Animation
Dinah	United States	Traditional Animation
The Dish Ran Away with the Spoon	United States	Traditional Animation
A Dizzy Day	United States	Traditional Animation
Doughnuts	United States	Traditional Animation
Down by the Old Mill Stream	United States	Traditional Animation
Fanny in the Lion's Den	United States	Traditional Animation
Fanny's Wedding Day	United States	Traditional Animation
The Fatal Note	United States	Traditional Animation
Father Noah's Ark	United States	Traditional Animation
Fétiche Mascotte	France	Live-action/stop-motion
Five and Dime	United States	Traditional Animation
Flip's Lunch Room	United States	Traditional Animation
Giantland	United States	Traditional Animation
Going to Blazes	United States	Traditional Animation
Ham and Eggs	United States	Traditional Animation
Hansel and Gretel	United States	Traditional Animation
Happy Hoboes	United States	Traditional Animation
Hook and Ladder Hokum	United States	Traditional Animation
Hypnotic Eyes	United States	Traditional Animation
I Like Mountain Music	United States	Traditional Animation
I've Got to Sing a Torch Song	United States	Traditional Animation
I Yam What I Yam	United States	Traditional Animation
In the Park	United States	Traditional Animation
Jack and the Beanstalk	United States	Traditional Animation
Jealous Lover	United States	Traditional Animation
King Klunk	United States	Traditional Animation
King Zilch	United States	Traditional Animation
Krazy Spooks	United States	Traditional Animation
Lullaby Land	United States	Traditional Animation
The Mad Doctor	United States	Traditional Animation
Magic Mummy	United States	Traditional Animation
The Mail Pilot	United States	Traditional Animation
Marching Along	United States	Traditional Animation
The Medicine Show	United States	Traditional Animation
The Merry Old Soul	United States	Traditional Animation
Mickey's Gala Premier	United States	Traditional Animation
Mickey's Mechanical Man	United States	Traditional Animation
Mickey's Mellerdrammer	United States	Traditional Animation
Mickey's Pal Pluto	United States	Traditional Animation
The Night Before Christmas	United States	Traditional Animation
The Oil Can Mystery	United States	Traditional Animation
Old King Cole	United States	Traditional Animation
On the Pan	United States	Traditional Animation
One Step Ahead of My Shadow	United States	Traditional Animation
The Organ Grinder	United States	Traditional Animation
Out of the Ether	United States	Traditional Animation
Pale-Face	United States	Traditional Animation
Pals	United States	Traditional Animation
Parking Space	United States	Traditional Animation
The Peanut Vendor	United States	Traditional Animation
The Phantom Rocket	United States	Traditional Animation
Pick-necking	United States	Traditional Animation
The Pied Piper	United States	Traditional Animation
Pirate Ship	United States	Traditional Animation
Play Ball	United States	Traditional Animation
The Plumber	United States	Traditional Animation
Popeye the Sailor	United States	Traditional Animation
Popular Melodies	United States	Traditional Animation
Puzzled Pals	United States	Traditional Animation
Reaching for the Moon	United States	Traditional Animation
Robinson Crusoe	United States	Traditional Animation
Romeo and Juliet	United States	Traditional Animation
Russian Dressing	United States	Traditional Animation
Seasin's Greetinks!	United States	Traditional Animation
The Shanty Where Santy Claus Lives	United States	Traditional Animation
The Shriek	United States	Traditional Animation
Shuffle Off to Buffalo	United States	Traditional Animation
Silvery Moon	United States	Traditional Animation
Sing, Babies, Sing	United States	Traditional Animation
Sing, Sisters, Sing	United States	Traditional Animation
Sittin' on a Backyard Fence	United States	Traditional Animation
Snow-White	United States	Traditional Animation
Soda Squirt	United States	Traditional Animation
Song Shopping	United States	Traditional Animation
Spite Flight	United States	Traditional Animation
Stoopnocracy	United States	Traditional Animation
Stratos-Fear	United States	Traditional Animation
Techno-Cracked	United States	Traditional Animation
Three Little Pigs	United States	Traditional Animation
Tight Rope Tricks	United States	Traditional Animation
Tropical Fish	United States	Traditional Animation
The Village Blacksmith	United States	Traditional Animation
Wake Up the Gypsy in Me	United States	Traditional Animation
Wedding Bells	United States	Traditional Animation
We're in the Money	United States	Traditional Animation
When Yuba Plays the Rumba on the Tuba	United States	Traditional Animation
Wild Elephinks	United States	Traditional Animation
The Wizard of Oz	Canada, United States	Traditional Animation
Ye Olden Days	United States	Traditional Animation
Young and Healthy	United States	Traditional Animation
The Zoo	United States	Traditional Animation

== 1934 ==
Name	Country	Technique
Aladdin and the Wonderful Lamp	United States	Traditional Animation
Along Came a Duck	United States	Live-action/traditional
Annie Moved Away	United States	Traditional Animation
Art for Art's Sake	United States	Traditional Animation
The Autograph Hunter	United States	Traditional Animation
Babes at Sea	United States	Traditional Animation
Beauty and the Beast	United States	Traditional Animation
Betty Boop's Life Guard	United States	Traditional Animation
Betty Boop's Little Pal	United States	Traditional Animation
Betty Boop's Prize Show	United States	Traditional Animation
Betty Boop's Rise to Fame	United States	Traditional Animation
Betty Boop's Trial	United States	Traditional Animation
Betty in Blunderland	United States	Traditional Animation
The Big Bad Wolf	United States	Traditional Animation
Bosko's Parlor Pranks	United States	Traditional Animation
Bowery Daze	United States	Traditional Animation
The Brave Tin Soldier	United States	Traditional Animation
Buddy and Towser	United States	Traditional Animation
Buddy of the Apes	United States	Traditional Animation
Buddy the Dentist	United States	Traditional Animation
Buddy the Detective	United States	Traditional Animation
Buddy the Gob	United States	Traditional Animation
Buddy the Woodsman	United States	Traditional Animation
Buddy's Adventures	United States	Traditional Animation
Buddy's Bearcats	United States	Traditional Animation
Buddy's Circus	United States	Traditional Animation
Buddy's Garage	United States	Traditional Animation
Buddy's Trolley Troubles	United States	Traditional Animation
Camping Out	United States	Traditional Animation
The Candy House	United States	Traditional Animation
Cactus King	United States	Traditional Animation
Cave Man	United States	Traditional Animation
Chicken Reel	United States	Traditional Animation
The China Shop	United States	Traditional Animation
Chris Columbus, Jr.	United States	Traditional Animation
The County Fair	United States	Traditional Animation
The Discontented Canary	United States	Traditional Animation
The Dizzy Dwarf	United States	Traditional Animation
The Dognapper	United States	Traditional Animation
Don Quixote	United States	Traditional Animation
A Dream Walking	United States	Traditional Animation
An Elephant Never Forgets	United States	Traditional Animation
The Flying Mouse	United States	Traditional Animation
Funny Little Bunnies	United States	Traditional Animation
The Ginger Bread Boy	United States	Traditional Animation
The Girl at the Ironing Board	United States	Traditional Animation
Goin' to Heaven on a Mule	United States	Traditional Animation
Goldielocks and the Three Bears	United States	Traditional Animation
The Goddess of Spring	United States	Traditional Animation
The Good Scout	United States	Traditional Animation
Grandfather's Clock	United States	Live-action/traditional
The Grasshopper and the Ants	United States	Traditional Animation
Gulliver Mickey	United States	Traditional Animation
Ha! Ha! Ha!	United States	Traditional Animation
The Headless Horseman	United States	Traditional Animation
Hell's Fire	United States	Traditional Animation
Holiday Land	United States	Traditional Animation
Holland Days	United States	Traditional Animation
Honeymoon Hotel	United States	Traditional Animation
How Do I Know It's Sunday	United States	Traditional Animation
Insultin' the Sultan	United States	Traditional Animation
Jack Frost	United States	Traditional Animation
Jest of Honor	United States	Traditional Animation
Jolly Good Felons	United States	Traditional Animation
Jolly Little Elves	United States	Traditional Animation
Jungle Jitters	United States	Traditional Animation
The Katnips of 1940	United States	Traditional Animation
Keep in Style	United States	Traditional Animation
Keeps Rainin' All the Time	United States	Traditional Animation
Kings Up	United States	Traditional Animation
Krazy's Waterloo	United States	Traditional Animation
Lazy Bones	United States	Traditional Animation
Let's All Sing Like the Birdies Sing	United States	Traditional Animation
Let's Sing with Popeye	United States	Traditional Animation
Let's You and Him Fight	United States	Traditional Animation
The Lion Tamer	United States	Traditional Animation
A Little Bird Told Me	United States	Live-action/traditional
Love Thy Neighbor	United States	Traditional Animation
The Man on the Flying Trapeze	United States	Traditional Animation
Mickey's Steam Roller	United States	Traditional Animation
The Miller's Daughter	United States	Traditional Animation
The Old Pioneer	United States	Traditional Animation
Orphan's Benefit	United States	Traditional Animation
The Owl and the Pussycat	United States	Traditional Animation
The Parrotville Fire Department	United States	Traditional Animation
Pastry Town Wedding	United States	Traditional Animation
Peculiar Penguins	United States	Traditional Animation
Pettin' in the Park	United States	Traditional Animation
Philips Cavalcade	United States	Stop-motion Animation
Playful Pluto	United States	Traditional Animation
Poor Cinderella	United States	Traditional Animation
Pop Goes Your Heart	United States	Traditional Animation
Puss in Boots	United States	Traditional Animation
The Rasslin' Match	United States	Traditional Animation
Rasslin' Round	United States	Traditional Animation
Red Hot Mamma	United States	Traditional Animation
Reducing Creme	United States	Traditional Animation
Rhythm in the Bow	United States	Traditional Animation
Robin Hood, Jr.	United States	Traditional Animation
A Royal Good Time	United States	Traditional Animation
Shake Your Powder Puff	United States	Traditional Animation
Shanghaied	United States	Traditional Animation
She Reminds Me of You	United States	Traditional Animation
She Wronged Him Right	United States	Traditional Animation
Sky Larks	United States	Traditional Animation
Southern Exposure	United States	Traditional Animation
Spring in the Park	United States	Traditional Animation
Sultan Pepper	United States	Traditional Animation
Tale of the Vienna Woods	United States	Traditional Animation
There's Something About a Soldier	United States	Traditional Animation
This Little Piggie Went to Market	United States	Traditional Animation
Those Beautiful Dames	United States	Traditional Animation
Those Were Wonderful Days	United States	Traditional Animation
The Toy Shoppe	United States	Traditional Animation
Toyland Broadcast	United States	Traditional Animation
Toyland Premiere	United States	Traditional Animation
The Trapeze Artist	United States	Traditional Animation
Tune Up and Sing	United States	Traditional Animation
Viva Buddy	United States	Traditional Animation
Viva Willie	United States	Traditional Animation
Wax Works	United States	Traditional Animation
When My Ship Comes In	United States	Traditional Animation
Why Do I Dream Those Dreams	United States	Traditional Animation
Why Mules Leave Home	United States	Traditional Animation
William Tell	United States	Traditional Animation
The Wise Little Hen	United States	Traditional Animation
Wolf! Wolf!	United States	Traditional Animation
Ye Happy Pilgrims	United States	Traditional Animation

== 1935 ==
Name	Country	Technique
Adventures of Popeye	United States	Live-action/traditional
Aladdin's Lamp	United States	Traditional Animation
Alias St. Nick	United States	Traditional Animation
Along Flirtation Walk	United States	Traditional Animation
Amateur Broadcast	United States	Traditional Animation
Amateur Night	United States	Traditional Animation
At Your Service	United States	Traditional Animation
Baby Be Good	United States	Traditional Animation
Balloon Land	United States	Traditional Animation
The Band Concert	United States	Traditional Animation
Barnyard Babies	United States	Traditional Animation
Be Kind to "Aminals"	United States	Traditional Animation
Betty Boop and Grampy	United States	Traditional Animation
Betty Boop with Henry, the Funniest Living American	United States	Traditional Animation
Beware of Barnacle Bill	United States	Traditional Animation
Billboard Frolics	United States	Traditional Animation
Bird Scouts	United States	Traditional Animation
Birdland	United States	Traditional Animation
The Bon Bon Parade	United States	Traditional Animation
Broken Toys	United States	Traditional Animation
Bronco Buster	United States	Traditional Animation
Buddy in Africa	United States	Traditional Animation
Buddy of the Legion	United States	Traditional Animation
Buddy Steps Out	United States	Traditional Animation
Buddy the Gee Man	United States	Traditional Animation
Buddy's Bug Hunt	United States	Traditional Animation
Buddy's Lost World	United States	Traditional Animation
Buddy's Pony Express	United States	Traditional Animation
Buddy's Theatre	United States	Traditional Animation
The Bull Fight	United States	Traditional Animation
The Calico Dragon	United States	Traditional Animation
The Camel's Dance	China	Traditional Animation
Candyland	United States	Traditional Animation
A Cartoonist's Nightmare	United States	Traditional Animation
Case of the Lost Sheep	United States	Traditional Animation
A Cat, a Mouse and a Bell	United States	Traditional Animation
Chain Letters	United States	Traditional Animation
The Chinese Nightingale	United States	Traditional Animation
Choose Your "Weppins"	United States	Traditional Animation
Circus Days	United States	Traditional Animation
Cock o' the Walk	United States	Traditional Animation
The Cookie Carnival	United States	Traditional Animation
Country Boy	United States	Traditional Animation
Country Mouse	United States	Traditional Animation
Dizzy Divers	United States	Traditional Animation
Do a Good Deed	United States	Traditional Animation
Doctor Oswald	United States	Traditional Animation
Elmer the Great Dane	United States	Traditional Animation
Fireman, Save My Child	United States	Traditional Animation
The First Snow	United States	Traditional Animation
Five Puplets	United States	Traditional Animation
Flowers for Madame	United States	Traditional Animation
Flying Oil	United States	Traditional Animation
Foiled Again	United States	Traditional Animation
Football	United States	Traditional Animation
For Better or Worser	United States	Traditional Animation
Fox and the Rabbit	United States	Traditional Animation
The Foxy-Fox	United States	Traditional Animation
The Golden Touch	United States	Traditional Animation
Gold Diggers of '49	United States	Traditional Animation
Good Little Monkeys	United States	Traditional Animation
A Happy Family	United States	Traditional Animation
Hey Diddle Diddle	United States	Traditional Animation
Hey-Hey Fever	United States	Traditional Animation
The Hillbilly	United States	Traditional Animation
Hollywood Capers	United States	Traditional Animation
Honeyland	United States	Traditional Animation
The Hunting Season	United States	Traditional Animation
The "Hyp-Nut-Tist"	United States	Traditional Animation
I Haven't Got a Hat	United States	Traditional Animation
I Wished on the Moon	United States	Traditional Animation
Into Your Dance	United States	Traditional Animation
It's Easy to Remember	United States	Traditional Animation
Japanese Lanterns	United States	Traditional Animation
A June Bride	United States	Traditional Animation
Kannibal Kapers	United States	Traditional Animation
King Looney XIV	United States	Traditional Animation
King of the Mardi Gras	United States	Traditional Animation
The Lady in Red	United States	Traditional Animation
Little Black Sambo	United States	Traditional Animation
Little Dutch Plate	United States	Traditional Animation
Little Rover	United States	Traditional Animation
The Lost Chick	United States	Traditional Animation
Make Believe Revue	United States	Traditional Animation
The Mayflower	United States	Traditional Animation
The Merry Kittens	United States	Traditional Animation
The Merry Old Soul	United States	Traditional Animation
Mickey's Fire Brigade	United States	Traditional Animation
Mickey's Garden	United States	Traditional Animation
Mickey's Kangaroo	United States	Traditional Animation
Mickey's Man Friday	United States	Traditional Animation
Mickey's Service Station	United States	Traditional Animation
Moans and Groans	United States	Traditional Animation
A Modern Red Riding Hood	United States	Traditional Animation
Molly Moo-Cow and Rip Van Winkle	United States	Traditional Animation
Molly Moo-Cow and the Butterflies	United States	Traditional Animation
Molly Moo-Cow and the Indians	United States	Traditional Animation
Monkey Love	United States	Traditional Animation
Monkey Wretches	United States	Traditional Animation
The Moth and the Spider	United States	Traditional Animation
Mr. and Mrs. Is the Name	United States	Traditional Animation
Music Land	United States	Traditional Animation
My Green Fedora	United States	Traditional Animation
Neighbors	United States	Traditional Animation
No! No! A Thousand Times No!!	United States	Traditional Animation
Old Dog Tray	United States	Traditional Animation
The Old Plantation	United States	Traditional Animation
On Ice	United States	Traditional Animation
Opera Night	United States	Traditional Animation
Parrotville Old Folks	United States	Traditional Animation
Parrotville Post-Office	United States	Traditional Animation
The Peace Conference	United States	Traditional Animation
Peg Leg Pete, the Pirate	United States	Traditional Animation
The Picnic Panic	United States	Traditional Animation
Pleased to Meet Cha!	United States	Traditional Animation
Pluto's Judgement Day	United States	Traditional Animation
Poor Little Me	United States	Traditional Animation
The Quail Hunt	United States	Traditional Animation
The Rag Dog	United States	Traditional Animation
The Robber Kitten	United States	Traditional Animation
Robinson Crusoe Isle	United States	Traditional Animation
Run, Sheep, Run!	United States	Traditional Animation
Scotty Finds a Home	United States	Traditional Animation
The Shoemaker and the Elves	United States	Traditional Animation
Simple Simon	United States	Traditional Animation
Sinbad the Sailor	United States	Traditional Animation
Southern Horse-pitality	United States	Traditional Animation
The Spinach Overture	United States	Traditional Animation
Spinning Mice	United States	Traditional Animation
Springtime Serenade	United States	Traditional Animation
The Sunshine Makers	United States	Traditional Animation
Three Lazy Mice	United States	Traditional Animation
The Tortoise and the Hare	United States	Traditional Animation
Three Orphan Kittens	United States	Traditional Animation
Towne Hall Follies	United States	Traditional Animation
Two Little Lambs	United States	Traditional Animation
Water Babies	United States	Traditional Animation
What a Night	United States	Traditional Animation
When the Cat's Away	United States	Traditional Animation
Who Killed Cock Robin?	United States	Traditional Animation
Ye Olde Toy Shop	United States	Traditional Animation
You Gotta Be a Football Hero	United States	Traditional Animation

== 1936 ==
Name	Country	Technique
The 19th Hole Club	United States	Traditional Animation
Alaska Sweepstakes	United States	Traditional Animation
Alpine Antics	United States	Traditional Animation
Alpine Climbers	United States	Traditional Animation
The Alpine Yodeler	United States	Traditional Animation
An Arrow Escape	United States	Traditional Animation
At Your Service Madame	United States	Traditional Animation
Barnyard Amateurs	United States	Traditional Animation
The Barnyard Five	United States	Traditional Animation
A Battle Royal (Kiko the Kangaroo)	United States	Traditional Animation
Battle Royal (Oswald the Lucky Rabbit)	United States	Traditional Animation
Beach Combers	United States	Traditional Animation
Beauty Shoppe	United States	Traditional Animation
Betty Boop and Little Jimmy	United States	Traditional Animation
Betty Boop and the Little King	United States	Traditional Animation
Bingo Crosbyana	United States	Traditional Animation
Birds in Love	United States	Traditional Animation
The Blow Out	United States	Traditional Animation
Bold King Cole	United States	Traditional Animation
Boom Boom	United States	Traditional Animation
Bottles	United States	Traditional Animation
Boulevardier from the Bronx	United States	Traditional Animation
A Boy and His Dog	United States	Traditional Animation
Bridge Ahoy!	United States	Traditional Animation
Brotherly Love	United States	Traditional Animation
A Bully Frog	United States	Traditional Animation
The Busy Bee	United States	Traditional Animation
The Cat Came Back	United States	Traditional Animation
Cats in a Bag	United States	Traditional Animation
Christmas Comes But Once a Year	United States	Traditional Animation
A Clean Shaven Man	United States	Traditional Animation
A Coach for Cinderella	United States	Traditional Animation
The CooCoo Nut Grove	United States	Traditional Animation
The Country Cousin	United States	Traditional Animation
Cupid Gets His Man	United States	Traditional Animation
Doctor Bluebird	United States	Traditional Animation
Donald and Pluto	United States	Traditional Animation
Don't Look Now	United States	Traditional Animation
Drusha	Soviet Union	Cutout Animation
The Early Bird and the Worm	United States	Traditional Animation
Elmer Elephant	United States	Traditional Animation
Farming Fools	United States	Traditional Animation
Farmer Al Falfa's Prize Package	United States	Traditional Animation
Farmer Al Falfa's Twentieth Anniversary	United States	Traditional Animation
The Feud	United States	Traditional Animation
The Fire Alarm	United States	Traditional Animation
Fish Tales	United States	Traditional Animation
Football Bugs	United States	Traditional Animation
Fun House	United States	Traditional Animation
Glee Worms	United States	Traditional Animation
The Goose That Laid the Golden Egg	United States	Traditional Animation
Gopher Trouble	United States	Traditional Animation
Happy Days	United States	Traditional Animation
The Health Farm	United States	Traditional Animation
The Hills of Wyomin	United States	Traditional Animation
Home Town Olympics	United States	Traditional Animation
The Hot Spell	United States	Traditional Animation
I Can't Escape from You	United States	Traditional Animation
I Don't Want to Make History	United States	Traditional Animation
I Feel Like a Feather in the Breeze	United States	Traditional Animation
I Love to Singa	United States	Traditional Animation
I Wanna Play House	United States	Traditional Animation
I'd Love to Take Orders from You	United States	Traditional Animation
I'm a Big Shot Now	United States	Traditional Animation
I'm in the Army Now	United States	Traditional Animation
In My Gondola	United States	Traditional Animation
It's a Greek Life	United States	Traditional Animation
Kiddie Revue	United States	Traditional Animation
Kiko and the Honey Bears	United States	Traditional Animation
Kiko Foils the Fox	United States	Traditional Animation
Knights for a Day	United States	Traditional Animation
Let It Be Me	United States	Traditional Animation
Let's Get Movin'	United States	Traditional Animation
Lil' Ainjil	United States	Traditional Animation
Little Beau Porky	United States	Traditional Animation
Little Cheeser	United States	Traditional Animation
Little Swee'Pea	United States	Traditional Animation
The Merry Mutineers	United States	Traditional Animation
Mickey's Circus	United States	Traditional Animation
Mickey's Elephant	United States	Traditional Animation
Mickey's Grand Opera	United States	Traditional Animation
Mickey's Polo Team	United States	Traditional Animation
Mickey's Rival	United States	Traditional Animation
Milk and Money	United States	Traditional Animation
Molly Moo-Cow and Robinson Crusoe	United States	Traditional Animation
More Kittens	United States	Traditional Animation
Mother Pluto	United States	Traditional Animation
Moving Day	United States	Traditional Animation
Music Hath Charms	United States	Traditional Animation
Neptune Nonsense	United States	Traditional Animation
Never Kick a Woman	United States	Traditional Animation
Night Life of the Bugs	United States	Traditional Animation
No Other One	United States	Traditional Animation
The Novelty Shop	United States	Traditional Animation
Off to China	United States	Traditional Animation
The Old House	United States	Traditional Animation
The Old Mill Pond	United States	Traditional Animation
Orphans' Picnic	United States	Traditional Animation
Page Miss Glory	United States	Traditional Animation
The Phantom Ship	United States	Traditional Animation
Plane Dippy	United States	Traditional Animation
Play Safe	United States	Traditional Animation
Popeye the Sailor Meets Sindbad the Sailor	United States	Traditional Animation
Porky in the North Woods	United States	Traditional Animation
Porky the Rain-Maker	United States	Traditional Animation
Porky's Moving Day	United States	Traditional Animation
Porky's Pet	United States	Traditional Animation
Porky's Poultry Plant	United States	Traditional Animation
Puddy the Pup and the Gypsies	United States	Traditional Animation
Puppet Show	United States	Traditional Animation
The Pups' Christmas	United States	Traditional Animation
The Pups' Picnic	United States	Traditional Animation
Rolling Stones	United States	Traditional Animation
The Runt	United States	Traditional Animation
The Sailor's Home	United States	Traditional Animation
Shanghaied Shipmates	United States	Traditional Animation
Skunked Again	United States	Traditional Animation
Slumberland Express	United States	Traditional Animation
Soft Ball Game	United States	Traditional Animation
Somewhere in Dreamland	United States	Traditional Animation
The Spinach Roadster	United States	Traditional Animation
Sunday Go to Meetin' Time	United States	Traditional Animation
Sunken Treasures	United States	Traditional Animation
Talking Through My Heart	United States	Traditional Animation
Three Blind Mouseketeers	United States	Traditional Animation
Three Little Wolves	United States	Traditional Animation
Thru the Mirror	United States	Traditional Animation
To Spring	United States	Traditional Animation
Toby Tortoise Returns	United States	Traditional Animation
Toonerville Picnic	United States	Traditional Animation
Toonerville Trolley	United States	Traditional Animation
A Tough Egg	United States	Traditional Animation
Toy Town Hall	United States	Traditional Animation
Trolley Ahoy	United States	Traditional Animation
Turkey Dinner	United States	Traditional Animation
Two Little Pups	United States	Traditional Animation
The Unpopular Mechanic	United States	Traditional Animation
The Untrained Seal	United States	Traditional Animation
The Village Smithy	United States	Traditional Animation
Vim, Vigor and Vitaliky	United States	Traditional Animation
A Waif's Welcome	United States	Traditional Animation
The Western Trail	United States	Traditional Animation
Westward Whoa	United States	Traditional Animation
When I Yoo Hoo	United States	Traditional Animation
A Wolf in Cheap Clothing	United States	Traditional Animation

== 1937 ==
Name	Country	Technique
Ain't We Got Fun	United States	Traditional Animation
Air Express	United States	Traditional Animation
The Air Hostess	United States	Traditional Animation
The Barnyard Boss	United States	Traditional Animation
The Big Game Haunt	United States	Traditional Animation
The Big Race	United States	Traditional Animation
The Billy Goat's Whiskers	United States	Traditional Animation
The Birthday Party	United States	Traditional Animation
The Book Shop	United States	Traditional Animation
Bosko's Easter Eggs	United States	Traditional Animation
Bug Carnival	United States	Traditional Animation
A Car-Tune Portrait	United States	Traditional Animation
The Case of the Stuttering Pig	United States	Traditional Animation
Circus Daze	United States	Traditional Animation
Clean Pastures	United States	Traditional Animation
Clock Cleaners	United States	Traditional Animation
A Close Shave	United States	Traditional Animation
The Country Store	United States	Traditional Animation
The Dancing Bear	United States	Traditional Animation
Ding Dong Doggie	United States	Traditional Animation
The Dog and the Bone	United States	Traditional Animation
Dog Daze	United States	Traditional Animation
Don Donald	United States	Traditional Animation
Donald's Ostrich	United States	Traditional Animation
The Dumb Cluck	United States	Traditional Animation
Duck Hunt	United States	Traditional Animation
Educated Fish	United States	Traditional Animation
Egghead Rides Again	United States	Traditional Animation
Everybody Sing	United States	Traditional Animation
The Fella with a Fiddle	United States	Traditional Animation
Firemen's Picnic	United States	Traditional Animation
Flying South	United States	Traditional Animation
Football Fever	United States	Traditional Animation
The Foxy Hunter	United States	Traditional Animation
The Foxy Pup	United States	Traditional Animation
Get Rich Quick Porky	United States	Traditional Animation
Gifts from the Air	United States	Traditional Animation
The Golfers	United States	Traditional Animation
Hawaiian Holiday	United States	Traditional Animation
The Hay Ride	United States	Traditional Animation
He Was Her Man	United States	Traditional Animation
Hollywood Picnic	United States	Traditional Animation
The Homeless Pup	United States	Traditional Animation
Hospitaliky	United States	Traditional Animation
The Hound and the Rabbit	United States	Traditional Animation
House of Magic	United States	Traditional Animation
I Only Have Eyes for You	United States	Traditional Animation
I Wanna Be a Sailor	United States	Traditional Animation
Indian Serenade	United States	Traditional Animation
The Keeper of the Lions	United States	Traditional Animation
Kiko's Cleaning Day	United States	Traditional Animation
Krazy's Race of Time	United States	Traditional Animation
Let's Go	United States	Traditional Animation
Little Buck Cheeser	United States	Traditional Animation
Little Ol' Bosko and the Cannibals	United States	Traditional Animation
Little Ol' Bosko and the Pirates	United States	Traditional Animation
Little Hiawatha	United States	Traditional Animation
The Little Match Girl	United States	Traditional Animation
Little Red Walking Hood	United States	Traditional Animation
Lonesome Ghosts	United States	Traditional Animation
Lovesick	United States	Traditional Animation
The Lumber Camp	United States	Traditional Animation
The Lyin' Hunter	United States	Traditional Animation
The Lyin' Mouse	United States	Traditional Animation
Magic on Broadway	United States	Traditional Animation
Magician Mickey	United States	Traditional Animation
The Mechanical Cow	United States	Traditional Animation
The Mechanical Handy Man	United States	Traditional Animation
Merry Mannequins	United States	Traditional Animation
Mickey's Amateurs	United States	Traditional Animation
Modern Inventions	United States	Traditional Animation
Moose Hunters	United States	Traditional Animation
Morning, Noon and Nightclub	United States	Traditional Animation
Mother Hen's Holiday	United States	Traditional Animation
My Artistical Temperature	United States	Traditional Animation
The Mysterious Jug	United States	Traditional Animation
Never Should Have Told You	United States	Traditional Animation
The Old Mill	United States	Traditional Animation
Organ Grinder's Swing	United States	Traditional Animation
Ostrich Feathers	United States	Traditional Animation
Ozzie Ostrich Comes to Town	United States	Traditional Animation
The Paneless Window Washer	United States	Traditional Animation
The Paper Hangers	United States	Traditional Animation
Picador Porky	United States	Traditional Animation
Pigs Is Pigs	United States	Traditional Animation
Pink Elephants	United States	Traditional Animation
Play Ball	United States	Traditional Animation
The Playful Pup	United States	Traditional Animation
Please Keep Me in Your Dreams	United States	Traditional Animation
Plenty of Money and You	United States	Traditional Animation
Popeye the Sailor Meets Ali Baba's Forty Thieves	United States	Traditional Animation
Porky and Gabby	United States	Traditional Animation
Porky the Wrestler	United States	Traditional Animation
Porky's Badtime Story	United States	Traditional Animation
Porky's Building	United States	Traditional Animation
Porky's Double Trouble	United States	Traditional Animation
Porky's Duck Hunt	United States	Traditional Animation
Porky's Garden	United States	Traditional Animation
Porky's Hero Agency	United States	Traditional Animation
Porky's Railroad	United States	Traditional Animation
Porky's Road Race	United States	Traditional Animation
Porky's Romance	United States	Traditional Animation
Porky's Super Service	United States	Traditional Animation
Pudgy Takes a Bow-Wow	United States	Traditional Animation
Puddy's Coronation	United States	Traditional Animation
Railroad Rhythm	United States	Traditional Animation
Red Hot Music	United States	Traditional Animation
The Rest Resort	United States	Traditional Animation
A Ride for Cinderella	United States	Traditional Animation
Rover's Rival	United States	Traditional Animation
Salty McGuire	United States	Traditional Animation
The Saw Mill Mystery	United States	Traditional Animation
Scary Crows	United States	Traditional Animation
School Birds	United States	Traditional Animation
September in the Rain	United States	Traditional Animation
She Was an Acrobat's Daughter	United States	Traditional Animation
Skeleton Frolics	United States	Traditional Animation
Speaking of the Weather	United States	Traditional Animation
Spring Festival	United States	Traditional Animation
The Steel Workers	United States	Traditional Animation
The Stevedores	United States	Traditional Animation
The Stork Takes a Holiday	United States	Traditional Animation
Streamlined Greta Green	United States	Traditional Animation
A Sunbonnet Blue	United States	Traditional Animation
Sweet Sioux	United States	Traditional Animation
Swing, Monkey, Swing	United States	Traditional Animation
Swing Wedding	United States	Traditional Animation
The Timid Rabbit	United States	Traditional Animation
The Tin Can Tourist	United States	Traditional Animation
Trailer Life	United States	Traditional Animation
Trailer Thrills	United States	Traditional Animation
Twilight on the Trail	United States	Traditional Animation
The Twisker Pitcher	United States	Traditional Animation
Uncle Tom's Bungalow	United States	Traditional Animation
The Villain Still Pursued Her	United States	Traditional Animation
The Wayward Pups	United States	Traditional Animation
Whispers in the Dark	United States	Traditional Animation
The Wily Weasel	United States	Traditional Animation
Woodland Café	United States	Traditional Animation
The Woods Are Full of Cuckoos	United States	Traditional Animation
The Worm Turns	United States	Traditional Animation
You Came to My Rescue	United States	Traditional Animation

== 1938 ==
Name	Country	Technique
A-Lad-In Bagdad	United States	Traditional Animation
All's Fair at the Fair	United States	Traditional Animation
Animal Cracker Circus	United States	Traditional Animation
Baby Kittens	United States	Traditional Animation
Barnyard Romeo	United States	Traditional Animation
Beside a Moonlit Stream	United States	Traditional Animation
The Big Birdcast	United States	Traditional Animation
The Big Cat and the Little Mousie	United States	Traditional Animation
The Big Top	United States	Traditional Animation
Blue Monday	United States	Traditional Animation
Bluebird's Baby	United States	Traditional Animation
Boat Builders	United States	Traditional Animation
Brave Little Tailor	United States	Traditional Animation
Bugs Beetle and His Orchestra	United States	Traditional Animation
Buried Treasure	United States	Traditional Animation
Buzzy Boop	United States	Traditional Animation
Buzzy Boop at the Concert	United States	Traditional Animation
The Captain's Christmas	United States	Traditional Animation
The Captain's Pup	United States	Traditional Animation
Cheese-Nappers	United States	Traditional Animation
Cleaning House	United States	Traditional Animation
The Cat and the Bell	United States	Traditional Animation
Chris Columbo	United States	Traditional Animation
Cinderella Meets Fella	United States	Traditional Animation
Count Me Out	United States	Traditional Animation
Cracked Ice	United States	Traditional Animation
The Daffy Doc	United States	Traditional Animation
Daffy Duck & Egghead	United States	Traditional Animation
Daffy Duck in Hollywood	United States	Traditional Animation
A Date to Skate	United States	Traditional Animation
A Day at the Beach	United States	Traditional Animation
Devil of the Deep	United States	Traditional Animation
The Disobedient Mouse	United States	Traditional Animation
Donald's Better Self	United States	Traditional Animation
Donald's Golf Game	United States	Traditional Animation
Donald's Nephews	United States	Traditional Animation
Eliza Runs Again	United States	Traditional Animation
Farmyard Symphony	United States	Traditional Animation
Feed the Kitty	United States	Traditional Animation
Ferdinand the Bull	United States	Traditional Animation
A Feud There Was	United States	Traditional Animation
The Foolish Bunny	United States	Traditional Animation
The Fox Hunt	United States	Traditional Animation
The Frog Pond	United States	Traditional Animation
Gandy the Goose	United States	Traditional Animation
Ghost Town Frolics	United States	Traditional Animation
The Glass Slipper	United States	Traditional Animation
Good Scouts	United States	Traditional Animation
Goonland	United States	Traditional Animation
The Goose Flies High	United States	Traditional Animation
Happy and Lucky	United States	Traditional Animation
Happy Scouts	United States	Traditional Animation
Have You Got Any Castles	United States	Traditional Animation
Here's to the Good Old Jail	United States	Traditional Animation
His Off Day	United States	Traditional Animation
Hollywood Bowl	United States	Traditional Animation
Hollywood Graduation	United States	Traditional Animation
The Honduras Hurricane	United States	Traditional Animation
The Horse on the Merry-Go-Round	United States	Traditional Animation
The House Builder-Upper	United States	Traditional Animation
Housewife Herman	United States	Traditional Animation
Hunky and Spunky	United States	Traditional Animation
Injun Trouble	United States	Traditional Animation
The Isle of Pingo Pongo	United States	Traditional Animation
Johnny Smith and Poker-Huntas	United States	Traditional Animation
Jungle Jitters	United States	Traditional Animation
Just Ask Jupiter	United States	Traditional Animation
The Kangaroo Kid	United States	Traditional Animation
Katnip Kollege	United States	Traditional Animation
The Lamp Lighter	United States	Traditional Animation
The Last Indian	United States	Traditional Animation
The Lion Hunt	United States	Traditional Animation
The Little Bantamweight	United States	Traditional Animation
Little Blue Blackbird	United States	Traditional Animation
Little Moth's Big Flame	United States	Traditional Animation
Little Ol' Bosko in Bagdad	United States	Traditional Animation
Little Pancho Vanilla	United States	Traditional Animation
The Lone Mountie	United States	Traditional Animation
Love and Curses	United States	Traditional Animation
Maid in China	United States	Traditional Animation
The Major Lied 'Til Dawn	United States	Traditional Animation
Man Hunt	United States	Traditional Animation
Merbabies	United States	Traditional Animation
The Mice Will Play	United States	Traditional Animation
Mickey's Parrot	United States	Traditional Animation
Mickey's Trailer	United States	Traditional Animation
Midnight Frolics	United States	Traditional Animation
Milk for Baby	United States	Traditional Animation
Moth and the Flame	United States	Traditional Animation
Mother Goose Goes Hollywood	United States	Traditional Animation
A Mountain Romance	United States	Traditional Animation
Movie Phoney News	United States	Traditional Animation
Mrs. O'Leary's Cow	United States	Traditional Animation
My Little Buckaroo	United States	Traditional Animation
Nellie the Indian Chief's Daughter	United States	Traditional Animation
Nellie the Sewing Machine Girl	United States	Traditional Animation
The Newcomer	United States	Traditional Animation
The Night Watchman	United States	Traditional Animation
Now That Summer is Gone	United States	Traditional Animation
Old Smokey	United States	Traditional Animation
Peg-Leg Pedro	United States	Traditional Animation
The Penguin Parade	United States	Traditional Animation
Philips Broadcast of 1938	United States	Stop-motion Animation
Pipe Dreams	United States	Traditional Animation
Pixie Land	United States	Traditional Animation
The Playful Polar Bears	United States	Traditional Animation
Polar Trappers	United States	Traditional Animation
Poor Elmer	United States	Traditional Animation
Poor Little Butterfly	United States	Traditional Animation
Porky & Daffy	United States	Traditional Animation
Porky at the Crocadero	United States	Traditional Animation
Porky in Egypt	United States	Traditional Animation
Porky in Wackyland	United States	Traditional Animation
Porky the Fireman	United States	Traditional Animation
Porky the Gob	United States	Traditional Animation
Porky's Five & Ten	United States	Traditional Animation
Porky's Hare Hunt	United States	Traditional Animation
Porky's Naughty Nephew	United States	Traditional Animation
Porky's Party	United States	Traditional Animation
Porky's Phoney Express	United States	Traditional Animation
Porky's Poppa	United States	Traditional Animation
Porky's Spring Planting	United States	Traditional Animation
Poultry Pirates	United States	Traditional Animation
Problem Child	United States	Traditional Animation
Pudgy the Watchman	United States	Traditional Animation
The Pygmy Hunt	United States	Traditional Animation
Queen's Kittens	United States	Traditional Animation
The Rabbit Hunt	United States	Traditional Animation
Robinson Crusoe's Broadcast	United States	Traditional Animation
Sailor Mouse	United States	Traditional Animation
Sally Swing	United States	Traditional Animation
Self Control	United States	Stop-motion Animation
Silly Seals	United States	Traditional Animation
The Sneezing Weasel	United States	Traditional Animation
Snowtime	United States	Traditional Animation
South Sea Sweethearts	United States	Stop-motion Animation
A Star is Hatched	United States	Traditional Animation
The Stranger Rides Again	United States	Traditional Animation
String Bean Jack	United States	Traditional Animation
The Swing School	United States	Traditional Animation
Tail End	United States	Traditional Animation
Thanks for the Memory	United States	Traditional Animation
Trade Mice	United States	Traditional Animation
The Village Blacksmith	United States	Traditional Animation
Voodoo in Harlem	United States	Traditional Animation
The Whalers	United States	Traditional Animation
What a Lion!	United States	Traditional Animation
What Price Porky	United States	Traditional Animation
Wholly Smoke	United States	Traditional Animation
Window Shopping	United States	Traditional Animation
The Winning Ticket	United States	Traditional Animation
The Wolf's Side of the Story	United States	Traditional Animation
Wynken, Blynken and Nod	United States	Traditional Animation
Yokel Boy Makes Good	United States	Traditional Animation
You Leave Me Breathless	United States	Traditional Animation
You Took the Words Right Out of My Heart	United States	Traditional Animation
You're an Education	United States	Traditional Animation

== 1939 ==
Name	Country	Technique
Aladdin and His Wonderful Lamp	United States	Traditional Animation
The Amazing Recovery of Inbad the Ailer	United States	Traditional Animation
Arabs with Dirty Fezzes	United States	Traditional Animation
Art Gallery	United States	Traditional Animation
The Autograph Hound	United States	Traditional Animation
Barnyard Baseball	United States	Traditional Animation
Bars and Stripes Forever	United States	Traditional Animation
The Bear That Couldn't Sleep	United States	Traditional Animation
Believe It or Else	United States	Traditional Animation
Benkei tai Ushiwaka	Japan	Traditional Animation
The Bird on Nellie's Hat	United States	Traditional Animation
The Birth of a Toothpick	United States	Traditional Animation
The Blue Danube	United States	Traditional Animation
Bola-Mola Land	United States	Traditional Animation
The Bookworm	United States	Traditional Animation
Breakfast Pals	United States	Traditional Animation
A Bully Romance	United States	Traditional Animation
Charlie Cuckoo	United States	Traditional Animation
The Charm Bracelet	United States	Traditional Animation
Chicken Jitters	United States	Traditional Animation
Crackpot Cruise	United States	Traditional Animation
The Curious Puppy	United States	Traditional Animation
Customers Wanted	United States	Traditional Animation
Daffy Duck and the Dinosaur	United States	Traditional Animation
Dangerous Dan McFoo	United States	Traditional Animation
A Day at the Zoo	United States	Traditional Animation
Detouring America	United States	Traditional Animation
Dog Gone Modern	United States	Traditional Animation
Donald's Cousin Gus	United States	Traditional Animation
Donald's Lucky Day	United States	Traditional Animation
Donald's Penguin	United States	Traditional Animation
Doomsday	United States	Traditional Animation
Early Abstractions	United States	Experimental
Fagin's Freshman	United States	Traditional Animation
The Film Fan	United States	Traditional Animation
The Frame-Up	United States	Traditional Animation
Fresh Fish	United States	Traditional Animation
The Fresh Vegetable Mystery	United States	Traditional Animation
G-Man Jitters	United States	Traditional Animation
Ghosks is the Bunk	United States	Traditional Animation
Gold Rush Daze	United States	Traditional Animation
Goldilocks and the Three Bears	United States	Traditional Animation
The Good Egg	United States	Traditional Animation
Goofy and Wilbur	United States	Traditional Animation
Hamateur Night	United States	Traditional Animation
Hare-um Scare-um	United States	Traditional Animation
A Haunting We Will Go	United States	Traditional Animation
Hello, How Am I	United States	Traditional Animation
The Hitch-Hiker	United States	Traditional Animation
Hobo Gadget Band	United States	Traditional Animation
The Hockey Champ	United States	Traditional Animation
Hook, Line and Sinker	United States	Traditional Animation
I'm Just a Jitterbug	United States	Traditional Animation
It's an Ill Wind	United States	Traditional Animation
It's the Natural Thing to Do	United States	Traditional Animation
Jeepers Creepers	United States	Traditional Animation
Jitterbug Follies	United States	Traditional Animation
Kristopher Kolumbus Jr.	United States	Traditional Animation
Land of the Midnight Fun	United States	Traditional Animation
Leave Well Enough Alone	United States	Traditional Animation
Life Begins for Andy Panda	United States	Traditional Animation
Little Brother Rat	United States	Traditional Animation
The Little Goldfish	United States	Traditional Animation
The Little Lion Hunter	United States	Traditional Animation
The Little Lost Sheep	United States	Traditional Animation
Little Tough Mice	United States	Traditional Animation
The Lone Stranger and Porky	United States	Traditional Animation
The Mad Maestro	United States	Traditional Animation
The Magic Beans	United States	Traditional Animation
Mama's New Hat	United States	Traditional Animation
Mickey's Surprise Party	United States	Traditional Animation
The Millionaire Hobo	United States	Traditional Animation
Musical Mountaineers	United States	Traditional Animation
My Friend the Monkey	United States	Traditional Animation
Naughty but Mice	United States	Traditional Animation
Naughty Neighbors	United States	Traditional Animation
Nellie of the Circus	United States	Traditional Animation
Never Sock a Baby	United States	Traditional Animation
Officer Duck	United States	Traditional Animation
Old Glory	United States	Traditional Animation
The One-Armed Bandit	United States	Traditional Animation
One Mother's Family	United States	Traditional Animation
The Orphan Duck	United States	Traditional Animation
Peace on Earth	United States	Traditional Animation
Petunia Natural Park	United States	Traditional Animation
Pied Piper Porky	United States	Traditional Animation
The Pointer	United States	Traditional Animation
Polar Pals	United States	Traditional Animation
Porky and Teabiscuit	United States	Traditional Animation
Porky the Giant Killer	United States	Traditional Animation
Porky's Hotel	United States	Traditional Animation
Porky's Movie Mystery	United States	Traditional Animation
Porky's Picnic	United States	Traditional Animation
Porky's Tire Trouble	United States	Traditional Animation
The Practical Pig	United States	Traditional Animation
Prest-O Change-O	United States	Traditional Animation
The Princess and the Pauper	United States	Traditional Animation
Rhythm on the Reservation	United States	Traditional Animation
Robin Hood Makes Good	United States	Traditional Animation
Scalp Trouble	United States	Traditional Animation
The Scared Crows	United States	Traditional Animation
Scrambled Eggs	United States	Traditional Animation
Screwball Football	United States	Traditional Animation
Seal Skinners	United States	Traditional Animation
Silly Superstition	United States	Traditional Animation
Sioux Me	United States	Traditional Animation
Slaphappy Valley	United States	Traditional Animation
The Sleeping Princess	United States	Traditional Animation
Sniffles and the Bookworm	United States	Traditional Animation
Snowman's Land	United States	Traditional Animation
Snuffy's Party	United States	Traditional Animation
So Does an Automobile	United States	Traditional Animation
Society Dog Show	United States	Traditional Animation
Soup to Mutts	United States	Traditional Animation
The Stubborn Mule	United States	Traditional Animation
The Three Bears	United States	Traditional Animation
Thugs with Dirty Mugs	United States	Traditional Animation
The Ugly Duckling	United States	Traditional Animation
Wanted: No Master	United States	Traditional Animation
Wise Quacks	United States	Traditional Animation
Wotta Nitemare	United States	Traditional Animation
Yip Yip Yippy	United States	Traditional Animation
