= 1934 in animation =

Events in 1934 in animation.

== Events ==
=== March ===
- March 16: 6th Academy Awards: Walt Disney's The Three Little Pigs receives the Academy Award for Best Animated Short Film.

=== May ===
- May 3: Wilfred Jackson's The Wise Little Hen premieres at the Carthay Circle Theatre; it features the debut of Donald Duck. The film would be released nationwide on June 9, which would later be declared as the date for Donald's birthday.

=== August ===
- August 3: The Fleischer Brothers' Betty Boop cartoon Poor Cinderella is released, it is the only Betty Boop cartoon made in color.

=== September ===
- September 1: The first cartoon from MGM, as well as the first in the Happy Harmonies series. The Discontented Canary from Harman and Ising is released.

=== Specific date unknown ===
- Alain Saint-Ogan releases the animated short Prosper et Le Concours de Beauté, based on his comic strip Prosper L'Ours.

== Films released ==
- 1 January – Chicken Reel (United States)
- 5 January:
  - The Autograph Hunter (United States)
  - Buddy the Gob (United States)
  - She Wronged Him Right (United States)
- 12 January:
  - Holland Days (United States)
  - Scrappy's Art Gallery (United States)
- 13 January – The China Shop (United States)
- 15 January – The Candy House (United States)
- 19 January – Sock-a-Bye, Baby (United States)
- 26 January – The Three Bears (United States)
- 27 January – Pettin' in the Park (United States)
- 29 January – Scrappy's Television (United States)
- 2 February – Red Hot Mamma (United States)
- 5 February:
  - Southern Exposure (United States)
  - The County Fair (United States)
- 9 February - Rip Van Winkle (United States)
- 10 February – The Grasshopper and the Ants (United States)
- 16 February:
  - Let's You and Him Fight (United States)
  - Tom Thumb (United States)
- 17 February:
  - Honeymoon Hotel (United States)
  - The Little Red Hen (United States)
- 19 February – The Toy Shoppe (United States)
- 23 February – The Last Straw (United States)
- 24 February – Buddy and Towser (United States)
- 2 March – Ha! Ha! Ha! (United States)
- 3 March – Playful Pluto (United States)
- 9 March:
  - Aw, Nurse (United States)
  - Cinder Alley (United States)
  - The Owl and the Pussycat (United States)
- 12 March – Kings Up (United States)
- 16 March – The Man on the Flying Trapeze (United States)
- 23 March – A Mad House (United States)
- 24 March – Funny Little Bunnies (United States)
- 30 March – Bowery Daze (United States)
- 2 April – Wolf! Wolf! (United States)
- 6 April:
  - Betty in Blunderland (United States)
  - Joe's Lunch Wagon (United States)
- 7 April – The Brave Tin Soldier (United States)
- 13 April:
  - Scrappy's Toy Shop (United States)
  - The Big Bad Wolf (United States)
- 14 April:
  - Beauty and the Beast (United States)
  - Buddy's Garage (United States)
- 16 April – The Ginger Bread Boy (United States)
- 20 April:
  - Busy Bus (United States)
  - Just A Clown (United States)
- 26 April – Those Were Wonderful Days (United States)
- 27 April – Can You Take It (United States)
- 3 May – The Wise Little Hen (United States)
- 4 May – The King's Daughter (United States)
- 5 May – Buddy's Trolley Troubles (United States)
- 11 May – Masquerade Party (United States)
- 14 May – Goldielocks and the Three Bears (United States)
- 18 May:
  - Betty Boop's Rise to Fame (United States)
  - Scrappy's Dog Show (United States)
  - The Lion's Friend (United States)
- 19 May:
  - Gulliver Mickey (United States)
  - Puss in Boots (United States)
- 26 May – Buddy of the Apes (United States)
- 28 May – Annie Moved Away (United States)
- 1 June:
  - Pandora (United States)
  - Shoein' Hosses (United States)
  - The Hot Choc-late Soldiers (United States)
- 15 June:
  - Betty Boop's Trial (United States)
  - Scrappy's Theme Song (United States)
  - Slow But Sure (United States)
  - Wax Works (United States)
- 16 June – Mickey's Steam Roller (United States)
- 22 June – The Queen of Hearts (United States)
- 23 June – Buddy's Bearcats (United States)
- 29 June:
  - See the World (United States)
  - Strong to the Finich (United States)
- 7 July – Scrappy's Relay Race (United States)
- 9 July – William Tell (United States)
- 13 July:
  - Betty Boop's Life Guard (United States)
  - My Lady's Garden (United States)
- 14 July – The Flying Mouse (United States)
- 23 July – Chris Columbus, Jr. (United States)
- 27 July:
  - Irish Sweepstakes (United States)
  - Shiver Me Timbers! (United States)
  - The Great Experiment (United States)
- 3 August – Poor Cinderella (United States)
- 6 August – The Dizzy Dwarf (United States)
- 10 August:
  - Aladdin and the Wonderful Lamp (United States)
  - Busted Blossoms (United States)
- 11 August – Orphan's Benefit (United States)
- 17 August – There's Something About a Soldier (United States)
- 21 August – Axe Me Another (United States)
- 24 August – Mice In Council (United States)
- 27 August – Scrappy's Expedition (United States)
- 1 September:
  - Peculiar Penguins (United States)
  - The Discontented Canary (United States)
  - The Trapeze Artist (United States)
- 3 September – Ye Happy Pilgrims (United States)
- 7 September – Why Mules Leave Home (aka Farmyard Whoopee) (United States)
- 21 September:
  - Betty Boop's Little Pal (United States)
  - Jail Birds (United States)
- 26 September – A Dream Walking (United States)
- 29 September:
  - The Headless Horseman (United States)
  - The Old Pioneer (United States)
- 5 October – The Black Sheep (United States)
- 12 October – The Katnips of 1940 (United States)
- 13 October – The Miller's Daughter (United States)
- 17 October:
  - Buddy the Detective (United States)
  - Shake Your Powder Puff (United States)
  - The Magic Fish (United States)
- 19 October – Betty Boop's Prize Show (United States)
- 22 October – Sky Larks (United States)
- 26 October – The Two-Alarm Fire (United States)
- 27 October:
  - Buddy the Woodsman (United States)
  - Tale of the Vienna Woods (United States)
  - The Valiant Tailor (The King's Tailor - Castle Films) (United States)
- 2 November:
  - Concert Kid (United States)
  - Hot Sands (United States)
- 3 November – The Goddess of Spring (United States)
- 8 November – Buddy's Circus (United States)
- 9 November – Holiday Land (United States)
- 12 November – Spring in the Park (United States)
- 16 November:
  - Keep in Style (United States)
  - Krazy's Waterloo (United States)
  - Tom, Tom the Piper's Son (United States)
- 17 November:
  - Buddy's Adventures (United States)
  - The Dognapper (United States)
- 23 November – The Dance Contest (United States)
- 24 November:
  - Bosko's Parlor Pranks (United States)
  - Don Quixote (United States)
- 30 November – Jack's Shack (United States)
- 12 December:
  - Babes at Sea (United States)
  - Viva Buddy (United States)
- 14 December – South Pole or Bust (United States)
- 15 December – Buddy the Dentist (United States)
- 20 December – Happy Butterfly (United States)
- 21 December:
  - When My Ship Comes In (United States)
  - Goofy Gondolas (United States)
- 22 December:
  - Jack Frost (United States)
  - Toyland Broadcast (United States)
- 28 December:
  - An Elephant Never Forgets (United States)
  - The Dog Show (United States)
  - We Aim to Please (United States)

== Births ==
=== January ===
- January 1:
  - Nobuaki Sekine, Japanese voice actor (voice of Takeshi Umihara in Cosmo Warrior Zero, Kenichi in Kimba the White Lion), (d. 2021).
  - Don Jurwich, American animation writer, director and producer, (Hanna-Barbera, Marvel Animation) (d. 2021).
  - Don Duga, American designer, storyboard artist, director and educator (Frosty the Snowman, The Little Drummer Boy, The Last Unicorn), (d. 2021).
- January 2: Marina Voskanyants, Russian animator (Thumbelina, The Town Musicians of Bremen, Golden Feather, The Key, Big Troubles), (d. 2024).
- January 8: Roy Kinnear, English actor (narrator of Bertha, voice of Pipkin in Watership Down and Bulk in SuperTed), (d. 1988).
- January 11: Mitchell Ryan, American actor (voice of Highfather in the Justice League episode "Twilight"), (d. 2022).
- January 14: Richard Briers, English actor (narrator of Roobarb and Noah and Nelly in... SkylArk, voice of Noddy in the 1975 Noddy TV series and Fiver in Watership Down), (d. 2013).
- January 17: Iwan Lemaire, aka Yvan Lemaire, Belgian comics artist, animator, photographer and painter, (d. 2012).
- January 18: Raymond Briggs, English illustrator, cartoonist, graphic novelist and author (The Snowman, When the Wind Blows, Father Christmas, The Bear, Ivor the Invisible, Fungus the Bogeyman, The Snowman and the Snowdog, Ethel & Ernest), (d. 2022).
- January 20:
  - Tom Baker, English actor (voice of Zeebad in The Magic Roundabout, The Bendu in Star Wars Rebels, The Fourth Doctor in Shada).
  - Phil Seuling, American organizer (founder of Comic Art Convention and Sea Gate Distributors) and voice actor (voice of one of the pig cops in Fritz the Cat), (d. 1984).
- January 25: Donald W. Ernst, American editor and producer (Ralph Bakshi, The Walt Disney Company), (d. 2023).
- January 26: Bob Uecker, American baseball player, sportscaster, actor and comedian (voice of the Narrator in the Teacher's Pet episode "Take Me Out of the Ball Game", Baseball Announcer in the Puppy Dog Pals episode "Take Me Out to the Pug Game", Bob Yucker in the Monsters at Work episode "The Damaged Room", himself in the Futurama episode "A Leela of Her Own" and the Teen Titans Go! episode "BBRBDAY"), (d. 2025).
- January 30: Tammy Grimes, American actress (voice of Albert in 'Twas the Night Before Christmas, Molly Grue in The Last Unicorn, Catrina in My Little Pony Escape from Catrina), (d. 2016).

=== February ===
- February 5: Hank Aaron, American professional baseball player (voiced himself in the Futurama episode "A Leela of Her Own"), (d. 2021).
- February 6: Bernard Erhard, American actor (voice of Cy-Kill in Challenge of the GoBots, Timber Smurf in The Smurfs, Cryotek in Visionaries: Knights of the Magical Light, King Morpheus in Little Nemo: Adventures in Slumberland, Wolf in Rover Dangerfield), (d. 2000).
- February 12:
  - Valerio Ruggeri, Italian actor (dub voice of Rabbit in Winnie the Pooh), (d. 2015).
  - Annette Crosbie, Scottish actress (voice of Galadriel in The Lord of the Rings, Granny Weatherwax in Wyrd Sisters, Nonna Dog in Lily's Driftwood Bay).
- February 13: George Segal, American actor (voice of J.B. in Aaahh!!! Real Monsters, Eli in Adventures from the Book of Virtues, Dr. Benton C. Quest in The Real Adventures of Jonny Quest, Horror in Billy & Mandy's Big Boogey Adventure, Peter Trickell in Scooby-Doo! Mystery Incorporated, Bernie in American Dad!, Nick in The Simpsons, Dr. Eli Selig in The Zeta Project episode "Absolute Zero"), (d. 2021).
- February 14:
  - Kazuhiko Kishino, Japanese voice actor (voice of Mayumi Kinniku in Kinnikuman), (d. 2020).
  - Florence Henderson, American actress (voice of Grand Mum in Sofia the First, Mallory "Mastermind" Casey in Loonatics Unleashed, Nanny Barbara in The Cleveland Show episode "The Men in Me", Ruby Stone in the Scooby-Doo: Mystery Incorporated episode "Dead Justice", herself in the Nightmare Ned episode "Monster Ned"), (d. 2016).
- February 17: Barry Humphries, Australian actor, author and satirist (voice of Bruce in Finding Nemo, Brauilo in Justin and the Knights of Valour, Wombo in Blinky Bill the Movie, narrator in Mary and Max), (d. 2023).
- February 21: Rue McClanahan, American actress and comedian (voice of Scarlett in Annabelle's Wish, Anastasia Hardy in the Spider-Man episode "Doctor Octopus: Armed and Dangerous", Bunny in the King of the Hill episode "Hair Today, Gone Today"), (d. 2010).

=== March ===
- March 3: Paul van Gorcum, German-born Dutch actor (Dutch dub voice of Jasper in the 101 Dalmatians franchise, Zazu in The Lion King franchise, Rabbit in The New Adventures of Winnie the Pooh, Gargamel in The Smurfs, Shere Khan in TaleSpin), (d. 2025).
- March 5: James B. Sikking, American actor (voice of Vice Principal Healy in Rocket Power, Seiya Tsukishima in Whisper of the Heart, Harry Caulder in the Batman Beyond episode "Mind Games", James Madison in the Duckman episode "The Once and Future Duck", Dr Carson in the Aaahh!!! Real Monsters episode "Nuclear and Present Danger"), (d. 2024).
- March 8: Abdul Rahman Abu Zahra, Egyptian actor (Egyptian dub voice of Scar in The Lion King, Jafar in Aladdin), (d. 2026).
- March 10: Motoo Abiko, Japanese manga artist (Doraemon, Ninja Hattori-kun, Obake no Q-Tarō, The Monster Kid, The Laughing Salesman), (d. 2022).
- March 14: George Wilkins, American composer (The Adventures of Teddy Ruxpin, The All-New Popeye Hour, Return to Oz), (d. 2024).
- March 26: Alan Arkin, American actor, director, and screenwriter (voice of Wild Knuckles in Minions: The Rise of Gru, Schmendrick in The Last Unicorn, J. D. Salinger in BoJack Horseman), (d. 2023).
- March 31:
  - Richard Chamberlain, American actor (voice of Highfather in Justice League: Gods and Monsters, Zigg in the ThunderCats episode "Forest of Magi Oar"), (d. 2025).
  - Shirley Jones, American actress (voice of Beatrice's mother in Over the Garden Wall, Victoria Claus in Christmas Is Here Again).

=== April ===
- April 2: Carl Kasell, American radio personality (voiced himself in The Simpsons episode "Pay Pal"), (d. 2018).
- April 3: Jane Goodall, English zoologist (voiced herself in The Wild Thornberrys episode "The Trouble with Darwin" and The Simpsons episode "Gorillas on the Mast") (d. 2025).
- April 6: Brian Cosgrove, English animator, designer, producer and sculptor (Cosgrove Hall Films).
- April 14: Jerry Tokofsky, American studio executive (Columbia Pictures), (d. 2025).
- April 16: Michael Jackson, British-American talk radio host and actor (voice of Jennings in The Lionhearts, Ganthet in Green Lantern: Emerald Knights, Alfred Pennyworth in Batman: The Dark Knight Returns), (d. 2022).
- April 29: Akira Takarada, Japanese actor (dub voice of Jafar in Aladdin, Ratigan in The Great Mouse Detective, Bendu in Star Wars Rebels), (d. 2022).

=== May ===
- May 10: Gary Owens, American actor (voice of Space Ghost in Space Ghost, Blue Falcon in Dynomutt, Dog Wonder, the title character of Roger Ramjet, Powdered Toast Man in The Ren & Stimpy Show, Commander Ulysses Feral in SWAT Kats: The Radical Squadron), (d. 2015).
- May 16: Ralph Votrian, American actor (voice of Anaheim Electronics Chief in Mobile Suit Gundam 0083: Stardust Memory, Lord Zortek in Gatchaman, King Lexian in Mighty Morphin Power Rangers and Masked Rider, the Narrator in Reign: The Conqueror, Konishi in Kaze no Yojimbo, Sophocles in The Little Polar Bear, Old Galein Musica in Rave Master, the Narrator and Doctor in the As Told by Ginger episode "Gym Class Confidential", Jeff's Grandpa in the Zatch Bell! episode "Rumble in the Snow"), (d. 2017).
- May 18: Dwayne Hickman, American actor, television executive, producer and director (voice of Aladdin in 1001 Arabian Nights), (d. 2022).
- May 25: David Burke, British actor (voice of the Narrator in the Shakespeare: The Animated Tales episode "As You Like It", God in the Testament: The Bible in Animation episode "Creation and the Flood", Goat-Kneed Commander in the Animated Tales of the World episode "The Shepherdess and the Chimney Sweep: A Story From Denmark"), (d. 2026).
- May 27: Harlan Ellison, American screenwriter (Cadillacs and Dinosaurs, Silver Surfer, Love, Death & Robots, voiced himself in Scooby-Doo: Mystery Incorporated, and The Simpsons episode "Married to the Blob", additional voices in The Pirates of Dark Water), (d. 2018).

=== June ===
- June 16: Bill Cobbs, American actor (voice of Chief in The Wild Thornberrys episode "Dinner with Darwin", Uncle Charles in the Rugrats episode "A Rugrats Kwanzaa"), (d. 2024).
- June 18:
  - Mitsuteru Yokoyama, Japanese manga artist (Tetsujin 28-go), (d. 2004).
  - George Hearn, American actor and singer (voice of Captain Ahab in The Pagemaster, Red in All Dogs Go to Heaven 2, President in Jonny's Golden Quest, Mr. Wheeler in Captain Planet and the Planeteers, Professor Hackle in SWAT Kats: The Radical Squadron, W.K. the Weenie King in the Fish Police episode "Beauty's Only Fin Deep", Theodore Block in the Garfield and Friends episode "The Man Who Hated Cats", The Mayor in Daisy-Head Mayzie).
- June 20: Heinz Edelmann, German graphic designer, illustrator, animator, cartoonist and comics artist (Yellow Submarine), (d. 2009).
- June 30: Aron Tager, American actor (voice of Cranky Kong in Donkey Kong Country, King Allfire in Blazing Dragons, additional voices in The Busy World of Richard Scarry and The Adventures of Sam & Max: Freelance Police), (d. 2019).

=== July ===
- July 17: Willie Ito, American animator (Walt Disney Animation Studios, Warner Bros. Cartoons, Hanna-Barbera).
- July 20: Gary L. Pudney, American television executive (ABC), (d. 2026).
- July 26: Shūichirō Moriyama, Japanese voice actor (Japanese dub voice of Flotsam and Jetsam in The Little Mermaid, Percival C. McLeach in The Rescuers Down Under, Buford in Rango), (d. 2021).
- July 28: Bud Luckey, American animator, composer (Walt Disney Animation Studios, Pixar, Sesame Street) and actor (voice of Rick Dicker in The Incredibles, Chuckles in Toy Story 3, Eeyore in Winnie the Pooh), (d. 2018).

=== August ===
- August 3: Staci Maniskas, American ink & paint artist (Bugs Bunny's Looney Christmas Tales, Bugs Bunny's Bustin' Out All Over, Hey Good Lookin', Filmation, Rover Dangerfield) and final checker (The Mouse and His Child), (d. 2022).
- August 5: Cammie King, American actress (voice of young Faline in Bambi), (d. 2010).
- August 16: Donnie Dunagan, American actor (voice of young Bambi in Bambi), (d. 2026).

=== September ===
- September 2: Chuck McCann, American actor, comedian, puppeteer and TV host (voice of Duckworth, Burger Beagle and Bouncer Beagle in DuckTales, The Thing in Fantastic Four and The Incredible Hulk, Blizzard in Iron Man, Heff Heffalump in The New Adventures of Winnie The Pooh, the Amoeba Boys in The Powerpuff Girls, "Moe" Mastro Giovanni in Adventure Time), (d. 2018).
- September 11: Ian Abercrombie, English actor (voice of Palpatine in Star Wars: The Clone Wars, Ambrose in Rango, Ganthet in Green Lantern: The Animated Series), (d. 2012).
- September 22: Camilla Mickwitz, Finnish animator, children's book writer and illustrator (Jason), (d. 1989).

=== October ===
- October 14: Bernard Hoffer, Swedish composer and conductor (Rankin/Bass).
- October 20: Timothy West, English actor (voice of King Dymas in Sinbad: Legend of the Seven Seas, Hrothgar in Animated Epics: Beowulf, Prospero in Shakespeare: The Animated Tales episode "The Tempest"), (d. 2024).
- October 23: Rita Gardner, American singer and actress (voice of Grandma Fox in the Dora the Explorer episode "Swiper's Favorite Things"), (d. 2022).
- October 30:
  - Jane Baer, Canadian-American animator (The Great Mouse Detective, Who Framed Roger Rabbit, Mickey's Christmas Carol, Rover Dangerfield, Tom and Jerry: The Movie, Sleeping Beauty, Beauty and the Beast, Hot Wheels), (d. 2026).
  - Hamilton Camp, English actor (voice of Gizmoduck in DuckTales, Greedy and Harmony Smurf in The Smurfs, Professor Moriarty in Sherlock Hound, young Barney Rubble in The Flintstone Kids, Dracula in Scooby-Doo! and the Reluctant Werewolf, Professor Chromedome in The Tick, Merlin in House of Mouse), (d. 2005).

=== November ===
- November 8: Oscar Kawagley, Yup'ik anthropologist, teacher and actor (voice of Inuit Narrator in Brother Bear), (d. 2011).
- November 13: Garry Marshall, American filmmaker and actor (voice of Buck Cluck in Chicken Little, Larry Kidkill and Sheldon Leavitt in The Simpsons, Soda Jerk in Penn Zero: Part-Time Hero, Manny Goldman in Scooby-Doo! and Kiss: Rock and Roll Mystery, Bernie in Father of the Pride, Dr. Weisberg in The Looney Tunes Show, Fred in the Rugrats episode "Club Fred", Mr. Itch in the Pinky and the Brain episode "A Pinky and the Brain Halloween", Abe in the BoJack Horseman episode "Yes And"), (d. 2016).
- November 9: Patrick Gleeson, American composer (Star Wars: Droids, Star Wars: Ewoks, The Plague Dogs), (2026).
- November 23: Robert Towne, American screenwriter and director (Little Nemo: Adventures in Slumberland), (d. 2024).

=== December ===
- December 9: Judi Dench, English actress (voice of Mrs. Calloway in Home on the Range, Miss Lilly in Angelina Ballerina, narrator in Doogal).
- December 18:
  - Martin Lavut, Canadian voice actor (voice of Wheez Weezel in The Devil and Daniel Mouse, Magic Mirror in Intergalactic Thanksgiving, Ard in Heavy Metal, Mylar in Rock & Rule, Mr. Settergren in Pippi Longstocking), (d. 2016).
  - Yoshinobu Nishizaki, Japanese animator (Mushi Production), and film producer (Space Battleship Yamato), (d. 2010).
- December 26: Matt Zimmerman, Canadian actor (voice of Alan Tracy and other various characters in Thunderbirds, Thunderbirds Are Go and Thunderbird 6, Professor Harold in the Thunderbirds Are Go episode "Tunnels of Time"), (d. 2022).
- December 27: Christopher Benjamin, English actor (voice of Rowf in The Plague Dogs, Duke Frederick and Corin in the Shakespeare: The Animated Tales episode "As You Like It"), (d. 2025).
- December 28: Maggie Smith, English actress (voice of Lady Bluebury in Gnomeo & Juliet and Sherlock Gnomes), (d. 2024).
- December 30: Joseph Bologna, American actor (voice of Dan Turpin in Superman: The Animated Series, Mr. Start in Ice Age: The Meltdown), (d. 2017).

== Deaths ==
=== February ===
- February 27:
  - John Terry, American comics artist and animator (Terrytoons), dies at age 53 or 54.
  - Gene Rodemich, American pianist and orchestra leader (Van Beuren Studios), dies at age 43.

=== July ===
- July 26: Winsor McCay, Canadian-American animator, cartoonist, and vaudeville performer, (pioneered the animation techniques of inbetweening, registration marks, and cycling, directed the animated films Little Nemo, How a Mosquito Operates, Gertie the Dinosaur, The Sinking of the Lusitania, and The Centaurs), dies at age 63–68.
