= The Skylarks =

The Skylarks may refer to:

- The Skylarks (vocal group), American singing group of the 1940s–1970s
- The Skylarks (South African vocal group), singing group associated with Miriam Makeba

== See also ==
- Skylarks, 1936 film
- Sky Larks, 1934 cartoon
