= Confidence (1933 film) =

1933 film

- Directed by: Bill Nolan
- Produced by: Walter Lantz
- Starring: Fred Avery; Allan Watson
- Music by: James Dietrich
- Animation by: Ray Abrams; Fred Avery; Cecil Surry; Jack Carr; Ernest Smythe
- Color process: B&W
- Production company: Walter Lantz Productions
- Distributed by: Universal Pictures
- Release date: July 31, 1933
- Running time: 7 min
- Language: English

Confidence is a Pre-Code animated short subject, produced by Walter Lantz, directed by Bill Nolan, and featuring Oswald the Lucky Rabbit. In the film, Oswald was voiced by multiple actors in this short. Oswald is a farmer whose farm falls prey to the ominous influence of the Great Depression (personified as a dark, shadowy figure). Determined to find a solution, Oswald flies to Washington, D.C. where he meets President Franklin D. Roosevelt. It was released by Universal Pictures on July 31, 1933 and is available on The Woody Woodpecker and Friends Classic Cartoon Collection DVD box set.
