= Five and Dime =

1933 film

- Screenshot
- Directed by: Bill Nolan
- Story by: Walter Lantz; Bill Nolan
- Produced by: Walter Lantz
- Music by: James Dietrich
- Animation by: Ray Abrams; Tex Avery; Cecil Surry; Jack Carr; Ernest Smyth
- Color process: Black and white
- Production company: Walter Lantz Productions
- Distributed by: Universal Pictures
- Release date: September 18, 1933
- Running time: 8 min
- Language: English

Five and Dime is a 1933 cartoon short by Walter Lantz Productions and stars Oswald the Lucky Rabbit. It is the 74th Oswald short produced by Lantz and the 125th overall.

== Plot summary ==
Oswald is dancing on an urban street until it suddenly rains. He then runs into a five and dime store. Because his shorts are quite saturated, Oswald grabs a wringer and heads somewhere within the store to dry it. The place he goes to, however, turns out to be the shop's display window where the outside crowd see him and laugh. When he returns to the main part of the shop, Oswald befriends the store clerk whose appearance resembles the girl beagle. The clerk asks Oswald if he could play the piano. Oswald insists as he plays the instrument and sings the song "I Found a Million Dollar Baby (in a Five and Ten Cent Store)", thus getting attention from the store patrons.

While the patrons watch Oswald's performance, a puppy, who looks like a browner version of the boy beagle, parts from his mother and decides to explore the store. After a few moments of wondering and playing some toys, the puppy finds a stout man and a thin man. Obliged to play a prank on the two men, the puppy throws a fish at the stout man's head. The stout man thinks the other person did it, and therefore delivers a haymaker onto the thin man. The thin man is sent airborne, knocking all the dishes off the shelf. To avoid trouble, the puppy knocks a Venus de Milo statue off its platform, and replaces it with himself.

The store's manager steps out of his office and is infuriated by the mess. Believing Oswald was responsible, the manager expels the young rabbit from the store and fires the clerk. Oswald and the disposed clerk go on to buy wedding garments. They then marry each other and find themselves a home.

== Trivia ==
- There is a Jimmy Durante Jack-in-the-box that the puppy uses as a prank.
- Charlie Chaplin and Laurel and Hardy make a cameo appearance as dolls.
- The short is available on The Woody Woodpecker and Friends Classic Cartoon Collection: Volume 2 DVD box set.

== See also ==
- Oswald the Lucky Rabbit filmography
