= Ham and Eggs =

1933 film

- Oswald and the girl beagle in the kitchen.
- Directed by: Walter Lantz; Bill Nolan
- Story by: Walter Lantz; Bill Nolan
- Produced by: Walter Lantz
- Music by: James Dietrich
- Animation by: Ray Abrams; Fred Avery; Cecil Surry; Jack Carr; Don Williams
- Color process: Black and white
- Production company: Walter Lantz Productions
- Distributed by: Universal Pictures
- Release date: June 19, 1933
- Running time: 6:13
- Language: English

Ham and Eggs is a 1933 animated cartoon produced by Walter Lantz, as part of the Oswald the Lucky Rabbit series. It is the 72nd Oswald short by Lantz and the 124th in the entire series.

== Plot ==
At a bistro, Oswald works as the chef while a girl beagle serves as the waitress.

The first customer is a tall Silky terrier who comes in for spaghetti. After finishing his meal, he slowly walks toward the cash register, pretending he would pay his bill. The tall terrier discloses that he has nothing to pay as he quickly exits the door and gives the bistro operators a raspberry. Nevertheless, Oswald and the girl beagle just laugh, knowing they can prevent other customers from running off.

The second customer is a boy beagle with an appetite for pancakes. As he receives his order and tries to take a nibble, the boy beagle finds the pancakes rock solid and therefore too hard to chew on, much to his disgust. He then starts tossing them around, prompting Oswald to tell him that such actions come at a price. Refusing to give a cent, the boy beagle heads toward the door. Before he could do so, however, he is nabbed by the robotic cash register that shakes off every single coin he has.

The third customer is a giant bear named Pete who orders an egg sandwich. Oswald cracks an egg which turns into a chick and cools itself and while he is in the kitchen, the bear starts flirting the girl beagle, and Oswald is aware of it. Irritated by that, Oswald saws out of two square wooden boards and glues them in between. The bear then receives and takes a bite of the false sandwich, thus resulting in cracked and chipped teeth. Provoked, the bear goes into a frenzy. Oswald is able to evade and fend off the bear's aggression, as the bear tries to catch Oswald but got knocked by Oswald's plan, which is the cash register's money drawer. The bear lands on the floor hitting a cabinet with drawers forcing the bear to feel dazed. Upon bringing their unruly client down, Oswald and the girl beagle put corn kernels plus a lighted oil lamp in the bear's trousers. The corn starts popping inside and the bear runs away hysterically.

The cartoon concludes with Oswald singing next to his colleague which he also did in the beginning.

== See also ==
- Oswald the Lucky Rabbit filmography
