= Parking Space (film) =

- Oswald meets the lady collie and the boy beagle.
- Directed by: Walter Lantz; Bill Nolan
- Produced by: Walter Lantz
- Music by: James Dietrich
- Animation by: Ray Abrams; Fred Avery; Cecil Surry; Jack Carr; Ernest Smythe
- Color process: Black and white
- Production company: Walter Lantz Productions
- Distributed by: Universal Pictures
- Release date: December 18, 1933
- Running time: 6:45
- Language: English

Parking Space is a 1933 American Pre-Code short animated film by Walter Lantz Productions, starring Oswald the Lucky Rabbit. It is the 77th Oswald film created during the Lantz era and the 128th to feature the character.

== Plot ==
Oswald runs a shop where commuters leave their young children to be watched by him while they have to be someplace else separately. One day, a lady collie comes to drop someone at the shop. Her submitted child is none other than the boy beagle.

The boy beagle feels unsure of the place he's in. He then goes to interact with the other youngsters, particularly a girl gibbon. Because the girl gibbon is often glum, he gives her a couple of milk bottles. To entertain her and everybody else there, the boy beagle encourages them to dance. The girl gibbon dances very joyously and therefore accelerates her movements. She dances so fast that the floor she is standing on ignites. A fire started forming on the floors. The fire in the short was not in animation, it is a clip of real fire from the fireplace. Meanwhile, outside, the children's guardians gathered as it is time to pick them up.

When Oswald reenters the shop, he is shocked to see the interior ablaze. He is able to salvage most of the children from the burning place using a vacuum cleaner. While he saves them, Oswald succumbs to the smoky atmosphere and collapses. The boy beagle comes to his rescue, and uses the vacuum to pull him out. The little dog then exits the place in the same way.

The vacuum bag somehow makes its way outdoors where it bursts, thus releasing Oswald and the youngsters. The guardians pick up their children and walk away happy. Oswald is greeted again by the lady collie who commends him for his heroic deed. The boy beagle later tries to interrupt Oswald but got kicked by the heel of Oswald's foot.
