= Jack Carr (animator) =

American animator and actor (1906–1967)

Jack Carr (born Frank Carr; May 17, 1906 – February 2, 1967) was an American actor and animator.

== Biography ==
Jack Carr was born Frank Carr on May 17, 1906, in Bayonne, New Jersey to James and Bridgett O'Donnell Carr, Irish immigrants. He was one of eight children. Starting as a cartoonist in The New York Globe, he started work at the Pat Sullivan studio in 1924, working for the Felix the Cat cartoons.

Carr worked for a number of animation studios and was a credited animator since at least the early 1930s. When, in 1930, Charles Mintz found a cartoon distributor in Columbia Pictures and moved his operations to California, Carr was amongst his staff; whilst working at Leon Schlesinger Productions, he provided the voice of Buddy in the Looney Tunes series from 1933 to 1934; in 1935, he was promoted to animator on the Looney Tunes and Merrie Melodies series. Carr later moved to Metro-Goldwyn-Mayer, where he is credited with naming the cartoon characters Tom and Jerry when William Hanna and Joseph Barbera had a naming contest amongst the staff; Carr won the $25 prize. Hanna and Barbera were said to be unhappy to have their characters named after a popular drink of the time, but history later proved that names having dual associations are the most popular as they are easier for the public to remember. He also, coincidentally, worked on two Tom and Jerry shorts during the CinemaScope period.

Carr acted as an extra, often uncredited, in nearly 100 films and television episodes from 1933 through 1963.

Carr's work may be found in the collection of the National Gallery of Art as part of the Index of American Design.

== Credited animator ==
Jack Carr animated or co-animated the following shorts, arranged by series and studio:

Krazy Kat, Screen Gems:

- Bars and Stripes (1931)
- Hash House Blues (1931)
- Piano Mover (1932)
- Love Krazy (1932)
- Hollywood Goes Krazy (1932)
- What a Knight (1932)
- Soldier Old Man (1932)
- Birth of Jazz (1932)
- Ritzy Hotel (1932)
- Hic-Cups the Champ (1932)
- Paper Hanger (1932)
- The Broadway Malady (1933)

Oswald the Lucky Rabbit, Walter Lantz Productions:

- Day Nurse (1932)
- The Busy Barber (1932)
- Carnival Capers (1932)
- Teacher's Pests (1932)
- The Plumber (1933)
- The Shriek (1933)
- Ham and Eggs (1933)
- Confidence (1933)
- Parking Space (1933)
- Five and Dime (1933)
- Kings Up (1934)
- The County Fair (1934)
- The Ginger Bread Boy (1934)
- Annie Moved Away (1934)
- William Tell (1934)
- Chris Columbus, Jr. (1934)
- Sky Larks (1934)

Looney Tunes & Merrie Melodies, Leon Schlesinger Productions:

- Buddy in Africa – Looney Tunes (1935)
- Alpine Antics – Looney Tunes (1935)
- I'm a Big Shot Now – Merrie Melodies (1936)

Barney Bear, MGM:

- Bear Raid Warden (1944)
- Barney Bear's Polar Pest (1944)
- The Unwelcome Guest (1945)

Tom and Jerry, MGM:

- Mucho Mouse (1957)
- Tom's Photo Finish (1957)

Carr was also an animator on The Yogi Bear Show and The Flintstones.
