= Making Good =

1932 film

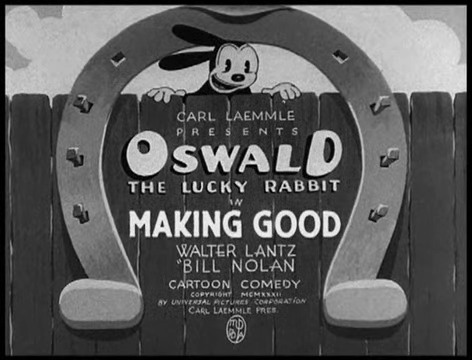
- Title card
- Directed by: Walter Lantz; Bill Nolan
- Produced by: Walter Lantz
- Music by: James Dietrich
- Animation by: Manuel Moreno; Ray Abrams; Fred Avery; Bill Weber; Vet Anderson
- Color process: Black and white
- Production company: Walter Lantz Productions
- Distributed by: Universal Pictures
- Release date: April 11, 1932
- Running time: 8:15
- Language: English

Making Good is a 1932 animated short film by Walter Lantz Productions, starring Oswald the Lucky Rabbit, a character originally created by Disney in 1927 and later replaced by the creation of Mickey Mouse. It is the 57th Oswald film by Lantz's studio and the 110th overall. The film had an original copyright notice, but it was not renewed.

== Plot ==
The short. (public domain)

A stork flies and carries a sack full of humanoid creatures which have antennas on their heads. The stork then enters a world in the heavens called Fairy Land. Oswald somehow is standing by in that world.

Though not affiliated with the stork, Oswald decides to assist that fowl. The stork approaches the home of a swallow, and Oswald does the negotiation. The swallow, however, declines the offer. Oswald and the stork then come to a weasel but get a similar response. Next, the two come to a granny who lives in a giant boot. This time their offer is accepted.

Contrary to the size of the sack, the humanoid creatures inside come out in dozens. It mattered little to the granny, though. Yards away, a mischievous giant terrier spots the boot, and heads to its location.

The terrier catches the boot's lace, and tries to take it. The creatures, who are bothered by the disturbance, evacuate. When the terrier runs away with the lace, Oswald, using a whistle, calls a flock of blue jays to shoo away the canine. The terrier returns to chew on the boot. Oswald uses the whistle again, this time calling a swarm of fleas. The terrier is so bothered by the fleas, thus starting to bite and scratch a lot. This goes until all the terrier's hairs fall off.

Though naked, the terrier takes the boot, and tosses it off an edge of Fairy Land. The terrier thinks he has the last laugh, and goes on to howl loudly. A giant Fairy Land inhabitant finds the howling bothersome, and therefore hurls a jar. The terrier finds his head stuck in the jar, prompting that canine to leave the scene for good. Oswald goes to also do some howling, thus irritating more inhabitants who hurl boots at him. Oswald then collects the boots and offers them to the creatures as replacements for the discarded one.
