= The Busy Barber =

1932 film

- Oswald stealing a tiger's tail for a barber pole.
- Directed by: Walter Lantz; Bill Nolan
- Story by: Walter Lantz; Bill Nolan
- Produced by: Walter Lantz
- Music by: James Dietrich
- Animation by: Ray Abrams; Fred Avery; Bill Weber; Jack Carr; Charles Hastings
- Color process: Black and white
- Production company: Walter Lantz Productions
- Distributed by: Universal Pictures
- Release date: September 12, 1932
- Running time: 6 minutes
- Language: English

The Busy Barber is a short animated film by Walter Lantz Productions, starring Oswald the Lucky Rabbit. It is the 64th Oswald short by Lantz and the 116th in the entire series.

== Plot ==
Oswald opens a barber shop. A hippo kid and his father are walking along as the hippo kid sucks on a peppermint candy. A dog steals the hippo's candy, causing him to cry. His father then decides to take the barber pole and give it to his son to lick as a giant peppermint candy, much to the son's joy. Oswald notices his barber pole being stolen but is unable to stop the hippo dad from taking it. Oswald then notices a tiger sleeping on the ground, deciding the tiger's striped tail to be a good substitute. The rabbit then picks up a saw and cuts the tail off the big cat.

Oswald returns to the location of his shop, and sticks the tail on the street just in front. In no time, customers start to come inside. The first one is a bloodhound who comes for a haircut despite only having one single hair on his head. After receiving the service, the bloodhound attempts to leave without paying. This patron, however, gets grabbed by the sentient cash register which shakes every cent it could get out of him.

Next to come in is a small fuzzy spaniel. The spaniel is covered in so much fur that Oswald mistakes their rear for their face and shaves that end by mistake. Nevertheless, the spaniel pokes fun at Oswald for his mistake before deciding to leave the shop quietly.

The third visitor is a rat who at first glance doesn't seem to need any service. However, Oswald takes off the rat's nose and puts in a lightbulb. To the rat's amusement, the rabbit lights up the bulb by inserting the rodent's tail into a socket. The last client was a hippo who wants a shave. The hippo's beard keeps growing back quickly just after being shaved, and thus Oswald attempts to complete the task in three different methods before finally succeeding. These methods include having a cow eat off his beard, shaving his beard with a ceiling fan, and hammering in his beard hairs like nails.

Things are going well for Oswald until the tiger awakens from its nap, realizes that its tail had been stolen by Oswald, and walks into his shop angrily. The tiger is pretty annoyed about what it lost earlier and is seeking vengeance. When the rabbit tries to flee, the big cat nabs and swallows him, although the sentient chair in Oswald’s barber shop forcefully turns the tiger inside out, freeing Oswald. Fearing further attack from this sentient chair, the tiger decides to leave, but understanding the tiger's disgruntlement, Oswald finally picks up the tail and puts it back on the striped beast as it heads out. The tiger is then overjoyed and strolls off peacefully, no longer wanting to wreak havoc. Relieved of his trouble as well as feeling happy for the big cat, Oswald simply laughs alongside his sentient chair.
