= The Plumber (1933 film) =

- Title card
- Directed by: Bill Nolan
- Story by: Walter Lantz; Bill Nolan
- Produced by: Walter Lantz
- Music by: James Dietrich
- Animation by: Ray Abrams; Tex Avery; Bill Weber; Jack Carr; Don Williams
- Color process: Black and white
- Production company: Walter Lantz Productions
- Distributed by: Universal Pictures
- Release date: January 16, 1933
- Running time: 7 min
- Language: English

The Plumber is a 1933 Walter Lantz animated short which features Oswald the Lucky Rabbit.

== Plot ==
Full short

Oswald is spending some time in a house with a girl beagle and a boy beagle. The girl beagle plays the piano while Oswald dances on top of it and sings the song It Ain't Gonna Rain No Mo'. Taking the idea too literally, the boy beagle throws a set of umbrellas out the window, much to Oswald's annoyance.

They then notice water dripping from the ceiling pipe of a nearby room. To check the problem, the boy beagle brings a ladder and Oswald climbs. Thinking of it more fun to create mischief than to help his friend, however, the boy beagle kicks and knocks down the ladder. Thus Oswald grabs and hangs onto the ceiling pipe which is very brittle. As a result, the pipe breaks, and large quantities of water pour in and flood the house. The girl beagle was frightened by this and therefore takes shelter inside a grandfather clock. After the clock was submerged, she tries to come out but could not because of the enormous pressure exerted by the flood. Oswald then comes and tries to bail her out.

Enjoying the flooded indoors, the boy beagle rides on a tub and releases four fishes. Upon reaching Oswald who is still trying to free the other beagle still in the clock, he pulls the rabbit's shorts with a fishing rod and tosses a biscuit inside. The fishes aggressively go in, and Oswald is disturbed.

Having enough disturbance, Oswald scares the fishes away but a giant marlin didn't take his gesture too kindly. The marlin began wrestling Oswald as well as stinging him with its pointed nose. When the marlin's attack suddenly misses Oswald, its nose strikes a wall instead, causing the big fish to become stuck and incapacitated. Oswald uses this as an opportunity to hit back. Following a few moments, the marlin was able to break loose but without its nose which remained stuck to the wall. Being on the marlin's side, however, the treacherous boy beagle gives the big fish a saw.

In an attempt to put Oswald in much bigger trouble, the marlin saws a hole in the floor which starts to drain the water and anything nearby. This move backfires as the marlin and the boy beagle are pulled into the opening. Oswald is able to keep himself in place until all the water disappears. The girl beagle finally comes out of the clock and embraces her boyfriend. The same song from the beginning plays as Oswald looks down on the first floor. The first floor was completely flooded while the boy beagle in a big wooden bucket swivels from side to side, singing the song. To ignore the beagle, Oswald pours down a big bucket of water and the bucket itself, and knocks down the boy beagle down into the water. Oswald and the girl beagle laughed at what the boy beagle did as the cartoon ends.

== Characters ==
Oswald's two beagle pals make one of their best known appearances in this cartoon.

The girl beagle serves as Oswald's second girlfriend, replacing Kitty respectively. Her typical outfit consists of a coif, coat, trousers, and high heeled pumps. Coincidentally, another female canine resembling her also appears in the Pooch the Pup cartoons but wearing different clothing.

The boy beagle plays a role as the series' troublemaker. He is smaller than the girl beagle, and his garment is a very long shirt that covers all the way to his ankles.

== See also ==
- Oswald the Lucky Rabbit filmography
