= Abdul Rahman Abu Zahra =

Egyptian actor (1934–2026)

- عبد الرحمن أبو زهرة
- Born: 8 March 1934; Damietta, Egypt
- Died: 11 May 2026 (aged 92); Cairo, Egypt
- Education: Higher Institute of Theatrical Arts
- Occupation: Actor
- Years active: 1961–2022

Abdul Rahman Abu Zahra (Arabic: عبد الرحمن أبو زهرة; 8 March 1934 – 11 May 2026) was an Egyptian theatre, television and film actor.

Abu Zahra died on 11 May 2026, at the age of 92. Upon his death, President El-Sisi extended his condolences, calling him an "esteemed artist [...] who presented valuable and distinguished artistic works in theater, cinema, and television." According to Gulf News, "his performances helped shape generations of Arab audiences, earning him a lasting place among Egypt's most respected actors."
