= Hollywood Goes Krazy =

1932 film

- Directed by: Manny Gould
- Produced by: Charles Mintz
- Music by: Joe DeNat
- Animation by: Jack Carr; Allen Rose (Note: Allen Rose's credit does not appear in original prints but in reissue prints.)
- Color process: Black and white
- Production company: Charles Mintz Studio
- Distributed by: Columbia Pictures
- Release date: February 13, 1932
- Running time: 5:36
- Language: English

Hollywood Goes Krazy is a 1932 short animated film featuring the comic strip character Krazy Kat, as well as some caricatures of well-known actors of the time.

== Plot ==
Krazy and his spaniel girlfriend are riding in a car, heading towards Hollywood to see if they can be movie stars.

When they reach the premises of the studio, Krazy tries to enter the office of the casting director but is quickly pushed out. He reenters but is still refused. The casting director emerges from the office and notices the spaniel. The casting director finds the spaniel interesting and takes her.

The casting director takes the spaniel to a couch in a sound stage where they sit down and chat. After treating her with cigars and wine, he shows her a contract which she finds interesting, but for some reason, the casting director menacingly picks up and holds the spaniel, prompting her to shout for help.

Krazy is still standing at the studio premises until he hears the spaniel's distress calls. He, however, needs to get past the guard who would not let him go further in the studio. Silent film actor Ben Turpin tries to disguise himself as Charlie Chaplin but the guard is not fooled. He then disguises himself as Groucho Marx but the guard is still not fooled. When a real actor (Eddie Cantor) tries to get through but is also being stopped by the guard, Krazy uses this as an opportunity to sneak pass. The guard still spots him sneaking in and pursues him.

On the run, Krazy tries to hide behind a house with removable parts, then behind Laurel and Hardy, but with a little help from the real Charlie Chaplin who is throwing pies, Krazy finally loses the guard. Film comedian Joe E. Brown swings a club at a few golf balls.

Krazy, at last, reaches the sound stage where the spaniel is in trouble. Krazy lands punches, and knocks out the villainous casting director. It turns out the scene involving the spaniel and the casting director is part of a movie scene being shot. The director is not happy with Krazy's unwanted approach. The director then picks up and slams Krazy to the ground.

== See also ==
- Krazy Kat filmography
