= Bars and Stripes =

1931 film

- Screenshot
- Directed by: Manny Gould
- Produced by: Charles Mintz
- Music by: Joe DeNat
- Animation by: Allen Rose; Jack Carr
- Color process: Black and white
- Production company: Charles Mintz Studio
- Distributed by: Columbia Pictures
- Release date: October 15, 1931
- Running time: 6:13
- Language: English

Bars and Stripes is a 1931 short film from Columbia Pictures and part of the Krazy Kat series.

== Plot ==
Krazy is on the second deck of his home, practicing his animated musical instruments, particularly a double bass. Still learning how to play, Krazy's performance is less than promising. Thus the other instruments at his back start to jeer at him. When the cat continues playing, the double bass, not liking his music, grabs his bow and shoves him off. Krazy then picks up another one, and the two engage in a bow fight. The duel ends with the feline tossing the big violin out the window. Krazy goes on to discard his other instruments similarly for their disloyalty. Down on the pavement outside, the double bass tells the cat that they will return in a larger number and get back at him.

To build up his battalion, the double bass and his associates parade on the street, calling for other instruments to join them. For every house they pass by, at least one comes out to go with the pack. In such a short period, a considerable number is reached, and they are ready to take on their feline foe.

The army of musical instruments arrive at the vicinity of Krazy's place and began firing their guns at the house. Despite the significant odds against him, Krazy takes a machine gun, and is able to shoot down much of the outside forces. Although they suffer numerous casualties, the instruments refuse to concede. They continue their gunfire until Krazy's house begins to crumble, but the feline is, nonetheless, unscathed. Closing in on the cat, one of the incoming attackers go for the coup de grâce, only to receive a backfire. Instead of landing on Krazy, the projectile pierces a barrel of whiskey, causing it to spray its contents onto the last instruments still on the offensive. At the conclusion of the battle, the instruments are intoxicated, and they play a blues tune before finally succumbing. Krazy remains on his feet and therefore gets the last laugh.

== Reception ==
One reviewer remarked: "Original and funny ... one has to do with the Kat aggravating a fiddle so an army of musical instruments ... lay siege to the Kat's homestead, the notes being the bombs and bullets".

== Availability ==
The short is available in the Attack of the 30s Characters collection.

== See also ==
- Krazy Kat filmography
