= Ritzy Hotel =

- Directed by: Manny Gould
- Produced by: Charles Mintz
- Music by: Joe DeNat
- Animation by: Allen Rose; Jack Carr
- Color process: Black and white
- Production company: Charles Mintz Studio
- Distributed by: Columbia Pictures
- Release date: May 9, 1932
- Running time: 6:12
- Language: English

Ritzy Hotel is a short animated film distributed by Columbia Pictures, and one of the many short films featuring the comic strip character Krazy Kat. A colorized version is available.

== Plot ==
Krazy is the janitor and bellhop of a luxurious hotel. His tasks include cleaning the mess of the guests and carrying their baggage.

As a janitor, Krazy sweeps the crumbs of three guys sitting on a couch. Krazy is so focused on his sweeping that he even sweeps a small chihuahua onto his dustpan, and the pet's mistress is a bit bothered. As Krazy continues sweeping, he unknowingly sweeps a strand of thread which is part of the mistress' dress, exposing her knickers. The mistress, upon noticing this, is pretty shocked and runs away breaking a hole in the wall.

In his first task as bellhop, the front desk clerk assigns Krazy to carry bags to a room upstairs, and Krazy heads for the elevators. The elevator operators are uncooperative as they would open, close, and move too soon before Krazy could get in.

It is unknown if Krazy completes the first bellhop work as the film shows the clerk assigning him to carrying another set of baggage to another room upstairs. Because of the unreliability of elevator operators, the cat decides to take the stairs. After the upward hike, Krazy reaches the door of the assigned room, but because he is carrying a lot of baggage, he could not see the door's keyhole, and therefore repeatedly strikes the key on the door's surface. The occupant opens the door, and gets poked by Krazy with the key. The occupant is pretty annoyed and literally pushes Krazy back to the lobby.

For his third bellhop task, Krazy is assigned to greet a guest outside. The guest's car arrives at the hotel's entrance. The guest is a grumpy old beagle who is on a wheel chair, and has a foot covered in bandage. Krazy tries to push the old beagle inside the hotel, but does so too quickly that the disabled dog's injured foot gets struck by the hotel's spinning door. The old beagle, who is quite irritated, pounds Krazy in the head with a cane. In the lobby, Krazy again pushes the old beagle too fast that his guest's bandaged foot crashes into the desk of the clerk, and Krazy receives another pounding. The old beagle calls for a room but struggles to sign a book, prompting Krazy to assist. Krazy takes his elderly guest to an elevator, and is the one to operate. The elevator suddenly stops upon reaching the top floor, and the old beagle is thrown upward from the wheelchair, and piercing the elevator's ceiling. Krazy gets his canine guest down, and opens the elevator. Because the elevator is not level with the floor, the old beagle falls flat on the face upon stepping out, and Krazy gets pounded with the cane for a third time. Once more, Krazy pushes his guest too fast that they crash into a window, and the old beagle falls out and hangs onto a horizontal flagpole by the trousers. Krazy reaches the window below where the flagpole is, and cuts it with an ax. The old beagle falls onto the wheel chair which Krazy already placed to break his client's fall. Feeling that his guest has had enough trouble, Krazy carries the old beagle back into the car. Before the car leaves, the old beagle pounds Krazy in the noggin with the cane one last time.
