= Teacher's Pests =

1932 film

- Directed by: Walter Lantz; Bill Nolan
- Produced by: Walter Lantz
- Music by: James Dietrich
- Animation by: Ray Abrams; Fred Avery; Bill Weber; Jack Carr; Charles Hastings
- Color process: Black and white
- Production company: Walter Lantz Productions
- Distributed by: Universal Pictures
- Release date: December 19, 1932
- Running time: 6:47
- Language: English

Teacher's Pests is a 1932 short animated film featuring Oswald the Lucky Rabbit. It is the 66th Oswald short by Walter Lantz Productions and the 118th in the entire series.

== Plot ==
A cow, who is a school teacher is doing a class. While she reacts as most of the students are singing, the boy beagle (making his debut in this film) blows his nose, that makes your teacher angry. When the cow tells the boy beagle to approach, Oswald puts his leg out of the way to trip him and his girlfriend, who is another beagle, puts a balloon under his very long shirt. The teacher is disappointed to see the boy beagle like this and as she strikes the little dog in the rear with a rod, the balloon bursts, creating a loud noise. The cow then tells the boy beagle to just stand next to the extra chalk board.

The cow then draws some numbers on the main chalk board, which is a subtraction account. She then calls Oswald to do something creative with them. Oswald takes out a music box which plays the song Raggamuffin Romeo. Surprisingly, the numbers on the board dance to his music.

At the extra chalk board, the boy beagle attempts to win the cow's forgiveness as he writes words of praise for her. After getting a little appreciation from her, he attempts to get more as he replaces some of the words with the teacher's face. The cow, however, misinterprets the act for something insulting, and therefore tells the boy beagle to stand on a tall stool.

On one of the class chairs, a bear is sleeping, and the cow is seemingly bothered by this. The cow then sends a balloon carrying a cinderblock, and then, she uses a bow with a candle to shoot and pop the balloon with the cinderblock to land on the bear's head to wake him up in a scary way. When the cinderblock lands on the bear's head, he wakes up as planned, and a hound from behind laughs at the accident. The bear responds by punching the hound. The hound tries to retaliate by hurling a book, only he ends up hitting Oswald instead of the bear and throws Oswald near the teacher. Oswald falls into a bin, and the cow confronts Oswald for some reason. The buffalo and Oswald engaged in a stick fight, resulting in the rabbit winning and pushing the teacher further in the background. A tabby comes forward, tossing chalk sticks around. The boy beagle jumps off the stool, and kicks the buffalo out of a window where she crashes onto a cake seller who drops some of the deserts.

Having enough of the students' unruly antics, the cow dismisses the class. As the students come out, the buffalo picks up and tosses the pies at them. Oswald and the boy beagle, however, are able to dodge the scheming teacher's projectiles. When the cow tosses one more pie, Oswald uses a U-shaped tube to send it back. The cow is knocked down and covered in the gooey mess from the pie. The film ends with Oswald and the boy beagle laughing.
