= Birth of Jazz =

1932 film

- Directed by: Ben Harrison
- Produced by: Charles Mintz
- Music by: Joe DeNat
- Animation by: Allen Rose; Jack Carr
- Color process: Black and white
- Production company: Charles Mintz Studio
- Distributed by: Columbia Pictures
- Release date: April 13, 1932
- Running time: 6:03
- Language: English

Birth of Jazz is a 1932 short animated film by Columbia Pictures, featuring Krazy Kat.

== Plot ==
The cartoon opens with an animated Earth sleeping in a snoring fashion. It then moves to a cat trying to enter a house's front yard only to be shooed away by a resident dog. The scene once more moves to a house where the ghost of Hungarian composer Franz Liszt rises from a bust, and plays Hungarian Rhapsody No. 2 on a piano.

Moments later, a flock of storks are flying across the night sky, carrying infants in sacks. One of them gets hit by lightning and therefore drops a sack. The sack falls into a house where it opens. The baby that comes out is none other than Krazy Kat in diapers. Despite being so young, the kitten has a knack for making music, especially in the jazz genre. As he plays Down Home Rag with one instrument and another, the others come to life and play along.

After spending time playing in the house, the young Krazy and the instruments take to the skies in an airplane. They then play Saint Louis Blues around the globe, and those who hear it dance to the rhythm. People who enjoyed their performance include: a man and a bull in a bullfight, Russian hooligans, Dutch clowns, and an African tribe. In no time, the animated Earth is awake and in an upbeat mood. Finally, Krazy and the instruments are parading on the street with thousands of spectators watching. When they reach the end of their march, a man in a tophat approaches and awards Krazy the key to a particular city.

== See also ==
- Krazy Kat filmography
