= Wins Out =

1932 film

- Directed by: Walter Lantz; Bill Nolan
- Produced by: Walter Lantz
- Starring: Fred Avery
- Music by: James Dietrich
- Animation by: Manuel Moreno; Ray Abrams; Fred Avery; Lester Kline; Vet Anderson
- Color process: Black and white
- Production company: Walter Lantz Productions
- Distributed by: Universal Pictures
- Release date: March 14, 1932
- Running time: 7:04
- Language: English

Wins Out is a 1932 animated short film by Walter Lantz Productions, featuring Oswald the Lucky Rabbit.

== Plot ==
Oswald is a baker who bakes for a hippo king. For the majesty's dinner, Oswald bakes a giant pie filled with living crows, a reference to the nursery rhyme Sing a Song of Sixpence. When a little mess from his work gets on his master's face, the hippo king threatens to penalize Oswald. However, the princess, who is Kitty, comes to his defense and begs to give the rabbit a second chance. The hippo king forgives Oswald but warns him that he will lose a head if something unpleasant happens to the pie.

Oswald is back at the kitchen, standing next to the pie. While the hippo king's dinner is still hours away, a crow from within the pie calls another crow from out the window. To Oswald's surprise, the outsider crow cuts a hole in the pie, enabling the crows from inside the dish to escape.

As the crows are just outdoors, Oswald attempts to put salt on their tails. One of the crows, however, is clever to replace the salt shaker with one containing pepper. When Oswald sprinkles pepper which has no effect, that crow blows the condiment on the rabbit's face. As Oswald sneezes, the crows have their feathers blown off, therefore eliminating their ability to fly. The crows then get away by running. Oswald resorts to shooting arrows. One of Oswald's arrows unintendedly hits a giant serpent. The provoked serpent heads toward the hippo king's castle. Oswald and the crows hide themselves in the pie. The serpent also enters the dish.

The hippo king calls for the pie as it is dinner time. The servants are the ones who carry the dish to him. When Oswald pops out of the pie, the hippo king is quick to give the rabbit to the headsman. Before Oswald could lose his head, the serpent also pops out of the pie. The serpent frightens everybody around, especially the headsman who leaves the castle for good by smashing through the wall with his body. The serpent catches Kitty but Oswald is able to rescue her. Oswald and Kitty continue to keep distance as the long beast pursues them. As the chase goes on in circles, the serpent, without realizing, devours its tail and up to its torso, thus destroying itself.

Following the defeat of the serpent, the hippo king resumes to have the pie, and no longer seeks to penalize Oswald. The crows come out of the dead serpent's mouth (implying they were swallowed sometime earlier) before reentering the pie. As the pie is presented to the hippo king, the crows rise to the surface of the dish, and play musical instruments in the style of an orchestra.
