= Kounty Fair =

1930 film

- Title card
- Directed by: Walter Lantz
- Produced by: Walter Lantz
- Music by: David Broekman
- Animation by: R.C. Hamilton; Bill Nolan; Tom Palmer
- Color process: B&W
- Production company: Walter Lantz Productions
- Distributed by: Universal Pictures
- Release date: January 6, 1930
- Running time: 6:51
- Language: English

Kounty Fair is a 1930 animated cartoon released by Universal Pictures starring Oswald the Lucky Rabbit.

== Storyline ==
Silent short

Oswald is merrily riding on a pony, heading towards the residence of his girlfriend Ortensia. Ortensia is doing some chores but finishes the moment the rabbit arrives. Following a short greeting, the two lovers head for a little trip to the fair.

At the fair grounds, Oswald and Ortensia are intrigued by the numerous games and services being offered. The female cat and the rabbit first come to a hot dog stand from Pete and the rabbit takes the female cat to eat there. While the two are waiting for their order, the hot dog arrives for Ortensia, she catches it with her tongue and swallows it, until something suddenly catches them attention. In this, Oswald and Ortensia quickly leaves, without paying, much to the vendor's disgust.

What interests Oswald and Ortensia is a talents contest. Oswald and Ortensia consider giving it a try as they are both skilled for dance, which is a talent.

The vendor also finds interest in the dancing event and he comes to get back at them, probably because the two for not paid previously and he kicks them away. He decides to perform as he goes first. The vendor dances pretty well and goes on to pick up the pace. As he speeds up further, however, the bottom of his garments somehow catches fire, prompting him to run and put your feet in a lemonade bowl.

Finally it is Oswald and Ortensia's turn to take center stage. When they begin, their moves are fluent, going according to plan, and they never mess up. They go on to win the contest and the coveted trophy. Until they actually win the trophy, Oswald cuddles and treats Ortensia affectionately and then the two kiss as the mouse comes out of the broken trophy all beat up and faints after getting beat up by Oswald
