= Betty Boop's Life Guard =

- Directed by: Dave Fleischer
- Produced by: Max Fleischer
- Starring: Bonnie Poe
- Animation by: Willard Bowsky; David Tendlar
- Color process: Black-and-white
- Production company: Fleischer Studios
- Distributed by: Paramount Pictures
- Release date: July 13, 1934
- Running time: 7 mins
- Language: English

Betty Boop's Life Guard is a 1934 Fleischer Studios animated short film starring Betty Boop.

== Plot ==
Betty is spending the day at the beach, where her boyfriend Fearless Freddy works as a life guard. Betty is enjoying the ocean while floating in her inflatable rubber horsey when it springs a leak. Freddy dives in to save Betty, but she goes under, where she begins to imagine she's a mermaid. At first Betty enjoys her new underwater life, swimming and singing with the other undersea inhabitants. The fun ends when a sea monster chases her. Just before the monster catches her, she wakes up, safe in Freddy's arms.

== Notes and comments ==
- This is the first Post-Code Betty Boop cartoon. The Hays Office ordered the removal of the suggestive curtain introduction which had started the cartoons until then because Betty Boop's winks and shaking of her hips was deemed "suggestive of immorality."
- This cartoon featured the second appearance of Betty's boyfriend Fearless Freddy.
- This was released just 13 days after the Hays-Code affected on July 1, 1934.
