= The Trapeze Artist =

- Story by: Sid Marcus
- Produced by: Charles Mintz
- Music by: Joe DeNat
- Animation by: Arthur Davis
- Color process: Black and white
- Production company: Charles Mintz Studio
- Distributed by: Columbia Pictures
- Release date: September 1, 1934
- Running time: 7:13
- Language: English

The Trapeze Artist is a 1934 short animated film by Columbia Pictures, starring Krazy Kat. In some reissue prints, the film goes by the alternate title Stabbed in the Circus.

== Plot ==
Krazy comes to watch the circus with a female mink. The act being performed is the flying trapeze. Because their seats are on a balcony, the trapeze can get close to them. The acrobat flirts and momentarily takes the mink. While the mink and the acrobat are swinging together, Krazy, who is quite annoyed, conjures a huge needle. Krazy pricks the acrobat in the rear which causes that performer to fall off the bar. Krazy, however, gets arrested by two cops who witness his deed.

Krazy is taken to a courthouse. When the judge asks him about the incident at the circus, Krazy explains in song how he tries hard to be a proper date with the mink as well as the struggles her family have in making her his bride. Everybody in the courthouse feels sorry for Krazy, and they even shed tears.

Back in the circus, the acrobat and the mink are still swinging together. The acrobat kisses the mink twice. The mink, for some reason, loses affection with him, and therefore pushes him off the trapeze. Upon dropping on the safety net, the acrobat gets catapulted for a few miles.

In the courthouse, Krazy is still standing around, attending the session. In no time the acrobat, after a long airborne trip, falls through the roof and into the room. Upon getting back up, the acrobat takes a large piece of lumber, and aims to assault Krazy. After some chase and trading some hits, the acrobat crashes and gets stuck in the judge's desk. Krazy, using a shovel from the room, scoops some burning coals from a stove and pours them into the acrobat's trousers. The acrobat runs hysterically, and even carries away the judge. Momentarily the mink comes to the scene and hugs Krazy. Krazy and the mink sit and swing on the court's chandelier like a trapeze.

== Detail of the end of the cartoon ==
Some scenes showing the burning coals from the stove and the one that Krazy, using a shovel from the room, scoops the burning coals from the stove and pours them into the acrobat's trousers, in the black and white copies of the short (original version), for some reason, were censored, but the 70's redrawn color version normally shows them.

== See also ==
- Krazy Kat filmography
