= The Discontented Canary =

1934 film by Rudolf Ising

- Title card
- Directed by: Rudolf Ising (uncredited)
- Produced by: Hugh Harman; Rudolf Ising
- Music by: Scott Bradley
- Color process: Technicolor
- Production companies: Metro-Goldwyn-Mayer; Harman-Ising Productions
- Distributed by: Loew's, Inc.
- Release date: September 1, 1934
- Running time: 8 min
- Country: United States
- Language: English

The Discontented Canary is a 1934 American animated short film directed by Rudolf Ising. It is the first film in the then-unnamed Happy Harmonies series and the first color cartoon to be produced by Harman-Ising Productions, having left Warner Bros. Pictures and abandoned the Looney Tunes and Merrie Melodies series the previous year. It is the oldest MGM cartoon to be owned by Warner Bros. Entertainment via Turner Entertainment Co.

== Plot ==
The cartoon begins with a canary in its cage and a parrot singing. The canary wants to get out of his cage, but he is locked inside while the parrot mocks him. Their owner, an old lady, gives them each snacks, but misunderstands the canary's body language as a need for fresh air, which inadvertently leads to the canary's freedom once she neglects to close the cage's door.

The canary flies out of the house and attracts the attention of a stray cat, who follows it to a tree populated by various birds, including a cuckoo who pretends to be Napoleon and kicks it off a branch. The canary is then mocked by a bee when it falls onto a flower, and by a hummingbird when it tries to drink nectar from a flower. The cat is hurt by some poison ivy when trying to catch the canary. A storm occurs and all the birds squeeze into a birdhouse, locking the canary outside. The cat pretends to be a birdhouse to trap the canary, but the canary is blown away from the cat. The cat then chases the canary, briefly swallowing it before the canary uses all its strength to escape from the cat's jaws. The cat gets its tail stuck at a lightning rod while the canary lands on a weather vane, only for the cat to be electrocuted and paralyzed from the waist down as it drags its limbs away from the house. Overwhelmed by the experience, the canary flies home after the weather vane is electrocuted, where it sings happily from the comfort of its own home.
