= Chris Columbus, Jr. =

1934 animated short film

- Directed by: Walter Lantz
- Produced by: Walter Lantz
- Starring: Fred Avery
- Music by: James Dietrich
- Animation by: Fred Avery; Jack Carr; Ray Abrams; Joe d'Igalo; Ernest Smythe; Victor McLeod
- Color process: Black and white
- Production company: Walter Lantz Productions
- Distributed by: Universal Pictures
- Release date: July 23, 1934
- Running time: 8:17
- Language: English

Chris Columbus, Jr. is a 1934 short animated film by Walter Lantz Productions, starring Oswald the Lucky Rabbit. It is loosely based on the historic events leading to Christopher Columbus' sailing to the lands that were later named America. It is also among the few cartoons where Oswald plays a character other than himself.

== Plot ==
Chris Columbus, Jr. (Oswald the Lucky Rabbit) is one of few individuals who believe the world is round. Most people elsewhere insist it is flat and that they find him delusional. To prove them wrong, Chris plans to sail to India by going west.

Chris goes to the king of Portugal to request ships and equipment, only to be denied. He then heads to the king of England but gets a similar answer. Finally he turns to the king and queen of Spain. While the Spanish king is unwilling to help, the Spanish queen shows sympathy and thinks otherwise.

The Spanish queen provides the ships Chris needed. The people whom she brought to be Chris' shipmates are prisoners but Chris does not mind. Chris, at last, sets off on his voyage to India.

The transatlantic journey of Chris is going smoothly at first. He and his shipmates appear to be fine.

Days later, the first mate develops sour feelings for Chris. Like everybody else where they came from, he believes the world is flat. Thinking Chris has tricked them into sailing so they would fall off an edge, the first mate rallies the other shipmates to turn against and dispose of their captain.

Mutiny ensues but Chris is able to keep his renegade shipmates at bay. But despite his cleverness, the first mate is able to get the upper hand. Chris then finds himself hanging at the ship's bowsprit. The renegades cut him loose, causing him to drop. However, the water he lands on is only knee-deep. He then finds out land has been reached. He even regains the loyalty of his shipmates.

Chris and his men set foot on what they think is India but is actually America. They also befriend some of the inhabitants of the land. After spending several days there, Chris and his shipmates sail back to Europe, although one of them chooses to stay.

== Guild/Firelight reissue ==
The film was reissued under the title of Christopher Columbus, Jr. Also, the scene where the Spanish queen smashes a bottle on one of the crewmen during the christening was removed.
