= An Elephant Never Forgets =

- Directed by: Dave Fleischer
- Produced by: Max Fleischer; Adolph Zukor
- Starring: Gus Wickie
- Music by: Sammy Timberg; Jack Scholl
- Animation by: Seymour Kneitel; Roland Crandall; William Henning (uncredited)
- Color process: Technicolor (Two-Strip)
- Production company: Fleischer Studios
- Distributed by: Paramount Pictures
- Release date: January 2, 1935
- Running time: 7:19
- Country: United States
- Language: English

An Elephant Never Forgets is a 1935 animated comedy short film produced by Fleischer Studios as part of the Color Classics series. The film was directed by Dave Fleischer.

== Plot ==
In the middle of the jungle, all the animals go to school, singing along. Among these animals is an elephant who leads the chorus, a piglet who is full of mud, and a highly indifferent hippopotamus who walks so slow that a snail rapidly passes him.

When they arrive in class, the elephant sits in front of a hostile gorilla who uses a washboard to hit and annoy the elephant. In the meantime, the hippopotamus simply sits outside the class and soundly sleeps.

The teacher, a swan, sings another song while asking the animals various questions. They all reply that they can't remember, but the elephant proceeds to remind them that he never forgets. This continues until the swan asks the elephant a simple math question, which he shamefully admits to forget, and the class retorts him for it.

After this, the swan makes the class take a test, which she leaves in charge of a turtle.

As a joke, the animals use their quill pens to target the turtle's back, which looks like a dartboard. This leads to an all-out classroom riot with books and furniture flying about, the turtle completely losing control of the situation.

The swan returns (upon which everyone suddenly quiets down) and lets the class go home. The hippopotamus wakes up and gleefully runs home faster than a rabbit.

As the animals finish their sing-along song, the gorilla kicks the elephant, but gets hurt as the elephant places the washboard in his overalls. Then he hits the gorilla in the head and cheerfully recites his favorite slogan, "An elephant never forgets".

== Cast ==
- Gus Wickie as The Elephant / The Hippo

== Animation department ==
- Roland Crandall: animator
- Seymour Kneitel: animator
- Jack Scholl: lyrics
- Lou Fleischer: music supervisor (uncredited)
- Sammy Timberg: music, musical director
