= Sky Larks =

- Oswald and the big beagle about to go on the stratosphere flight to Mars.
- Directed by: Walter Lantz; Bill Nolan
- Story by: Walter Lantz; Bill Nolan
- Produced by: Walter Lantz
- Starring: Allan Watson
- Music by: James Dietrich
- Animation by: Fred Avery; Jack Carr; Ray Abrams; Joe D'Igalo; Ernest Smyth; Victor McLeod
- Color process: Black and white
- Production company: Walter Lantz Productions
- Distributed by: Universal Pictures
- Release date: October 22, 1934
- Running time: 7:39
- Language: English

Sky Larks is a 1934 animated short produced by Walter Lantz Productions and is part of the Oswald the Lucky Rabbit series.

== Plot ==
Oswald and a big beagle (referred to as "Dopey" by Oswald himself) are at a cinema watching a documentary about explorers who travel in hot air balloons. The documentary consists of footage of real-life balloonist Auguste Piccard. Oswald is amazed and after the show decides to become a balloonist himself.

At a fairground, a large crowd gathers to see Oswald take off in his balloon. The balloon is a large hot water bottle and the carriage is a pot-bellied stove. Oswald invites Dopey, who is in the crowd, to join him. Dopey refuses, but as the balloon rises, its anchor snags his pants and pulls them off. Embarrassed, he grabs the anchor and flies away with Oswald.

Oswald's balloon rapidly ascends and goes so far that they reach interplanetary space. They pass through the "Milky Way", populated by bottles of milk, and finally crash land on the planet Mars, much of which seems related to the "martial" topic of war. They see a giant sipping "Nitro Soup" and eating bombs. Oswald and Dopey flee, only to unknowingly run into the bore of a huge cannon. The cannon shoots them airborne and they land in the giant's soup bowl.

The giant recognizes them as Earthlings, and picks them up with his spoon and tries to eat them. After several attempts which they evade, they fall into a salt shaker. The giant puts the lid on the shaker, trapping them, and then calls for a dance. A variety of animate implements of war then put on a dance, including guns, rockets and gas masks. While the giant is distracted, Oswald and Dopey rock the salt shaker back and forth until they turn it upside down. By putting their legs through the shaker's holes, they are able run. They run into a pitcher, breaking the shaker, at which the giant notices their escape and grabs them.

The pair then find that the whole affair was a dream, as they awaken back in the now-empty cinema, with the janitor shaking them awake. Nevertheless, they are still frightened and run out of the cinema in a panic, to the bewilderment of the janitor.

== Notes ==
- Dopey is the father of the girl beagle (Oswald's third girlfriend). His appearance and personality are very similar to Wimpy, a character from the Popeye cartoons.

== See also ==
- Oswald the Lucky Rabbit filmography
