= Cecil Surry =

American animator (1907–1956)

Cecil Hays Surry (April 19, 1907 – September 19, 1956) was an American animator at various film studios in the Golden Age of Animation.

== Biography ==
Surry was born to Bert F. and Lydia or Lida B. (Knoblock) Surry in Chelan, Washington, where his father and uncle owned an orchard. He spent his youth in Washington State; the family moved by 1922 to San Diego. Surry enrolled in the Otis Art Institute and, as a second-year student, won a poster competition sponsored by the Junior League of Los Angeles for the third annual horse show of the Flintridge Riding Club.

By 1931, he got a job at Walt Disney Productions where he met his future wife Constance Berry. Voters lists show they married sometime between 1932 and 1934 (they also show he switched from being a registered Republican to Democrat before 1946).

Surry was first credited as an animator at Walter Lantz Productions studio in the 1933 short Going to Blazes. When fellow Lantz animator Tex Avery left to take a director's job at Warner Bros. Cartoons, Surry, Virgil Ross and Sid Sutherland went with him to work in the original Termite Terrace unit with Chuck Jones, Bob Clampett, Robert Cannon and assistant animator Elmer Wait. He is credited on only three Warner Bros. cartoons. Surry left to work at the reorganised MGM cartoon department where he eventually was placed in the Hanna-Barbera unit to work on Tom and Jerry cartoons, including uncredited work on the 1941 short The Night Before Christmas and 1942 short Dog Trouble.

In 1950, Surry began work at UPA. For a brief period in 1952, he returned to the Lantz studio and is credited as animator on three cartoons before returning to UPA, where he remained until his death in Los Angeles at age 49. By an odd coincidence, his only brother, Paul Wilson Surry, also died at the age of 49, in 1956.

Surry worked on two Oscar-winning cartoons, When Magoo Flew (1955) and Magoo's Puddle Jumper (1956).

He was also an artist for Dell Comics about the time he went to UPA.
