= The Bill Poster =

1933 film

- Directed by: Harry Love
- Produced by: Charles Mintz
- Animation by: Allen Rose; Preston Blair
- Color process: Black and white
- Production company: Charles Mintz Studio
- Distributed by: Columbia Pictures
- Release date: November 24, 1933
- Running time: 6:12
- Language: English

The Bill Poster is a 1933 short theatrical cartoon distributed by Columbia Pictures, and one of the many that feature Krazy Kat.

== Plot ==
Krazy, as the title implies, is a bill poster that places paper signs on walls or wire posts in the city. The signs he put on either promote shows or advise commuters not to do stuff that are banned in some places. He moves from one location to another in his horse-drawn carriage.

When he is finished for the day, Krazy pays a visit to his spaniel girlfriend at her house. While they are busy chatting, a kitten from next door comes outside to play. Seeing Krazy's horse on the street, the little cat comes to have a ride on it. The kitten sits aboard but the horse is dozing and refuses to move. The kitten then conjures a jar containing a bee which the tiny cat places at the horse's rear. The horse gets stung and finally runs, leaving behind its carriage. The spaniel, who is still chatting with Krazy, sees what happened and frantically informs her boyfriend.

Krazy dashes around, chasing his horse which is being ridden away by the kitten. The horse runs all over the city, bashing every object and bystander in its path. Krazy eventually catches the reins, but by the time he does, the horse crashes into a pile of logs. Krazy and the horse are dazed but the kitten is elated and obliged to have another wild ride.

== Characters ==
Krazy still has his round head and flat-end ears, a design applied by Ben Harrison and Manny Gould as early as The Stork Exchange (1927). The kitten in the short has pointed ears and a naturalistic facial design. For some reason the kitten's design would become the basis on how Krazy would look in the following year.

== See also ==
- Krazy Kat filmography
