= Antique Antics =

1933 film

- Directed by: Manny Gould; Ben Harrison
- Produced by: Charles Mintz
- Music by: Joe DeNat
- Animation by: Al Eugster; Preston Blair
- Color process: Black and white
- Production company: Charles Mintz Studio
- Distributed by: Columbia Pictures
- Release date: June 14, 1933
- Running time: 6:03
- Language: English

Antique Antics is a 1933 short animated film by Columbia Pictures, featuring Krazy Kat.

== Plot ==
The film begins just outside an antique shop, and a piece of Ludvig van Beethoven's Moonlight Sonata is played. Inside the shop, Krazy Kat, who operates the place, is having a little trouble walking around the ornaments. He lights a candle and makes it safely to his bedroom.

While Krazy is asleep, the ornaments in the shop, particularly the statues, come to life, and march to the melody of Franz Schubert's Three Marches Militaires which is played. The statues represent historical people like Theodore Roosevelt, Napoleon, and various. They then put up a party where they drink ale from casks, dance, and sing Auld Lang Syne. Their party is so audible that Krazy eventually wakes up and goes to investigate.

Several cartoons involve a theme where the shop's owner leaves, and the props come to life and party. The props would return to their quiet state if they knew the owner is coming back. In the case of Antique Antics, Krazy gets to join the party, and the statues do not seem to mind. The film concludes with Krazy getting himself a mug of ale.

== See also ==
- Krazy Kat filmography
