= Out of the Ether =

- Directed by: Manny Gould; Ben Harrison
- Story by: Harry Love
- Produced by: Charles Mintz
- Music by: Joe DeNat
- Animation by: Allen Rose; Harry Love
- Color process: Black and white
- Production company: Screen Gems Pictures
- Distributed by: Columbia Pictures
- Release date: September 5, 1933
- Running time: 6 min.
- Language: English

Out of the Ether is a 1933 short animated film distributed by Columbia Pictures, featuring Krazy Kat.

== Plot ==
Krazy, dressed as a surgeon, appears as though he is working on a patient. When he is done, and the fellow surgeons step aside, the patient turns out to be an animated radio. Krazy puts his newly repaired radio on a flying carpet before taking off.

Up in the sky, Krazy passes by a hot air balloon that resembles Paul Whiteman. Riding on that balloon are the fancy thin clarinet-playing man who once appeared in The Bandmaster, and the Mills Brothers. Under the balloon hangs a piano at which the Boswell Sisters sit by. Further on the way, Marie Dressler is sitting on a crescent moon and singing. Dressler boards on Krazy's carpet, and dances with the cat. They dance until the woman accidentally pushes Krazy off the carpet.

Upon falling off, Krazy lands on some clouds. On one of them, two mysterious boxers wearing turbans trade punches. This goes until one of them accidentally bumps Krazy off.

Krazy falls from the sky once more. Finally he hits the ground bottom first. His radio follows as it falls on and gets pierced by his head.

== Music ==
Popular songs featured in the film include Tiger Rag and When the Moon Comes over the Mountain.

== See also ==
- Krazy Kat filmography
