= Krazy Kat filmography =

List of released Krazy Kat cartoons

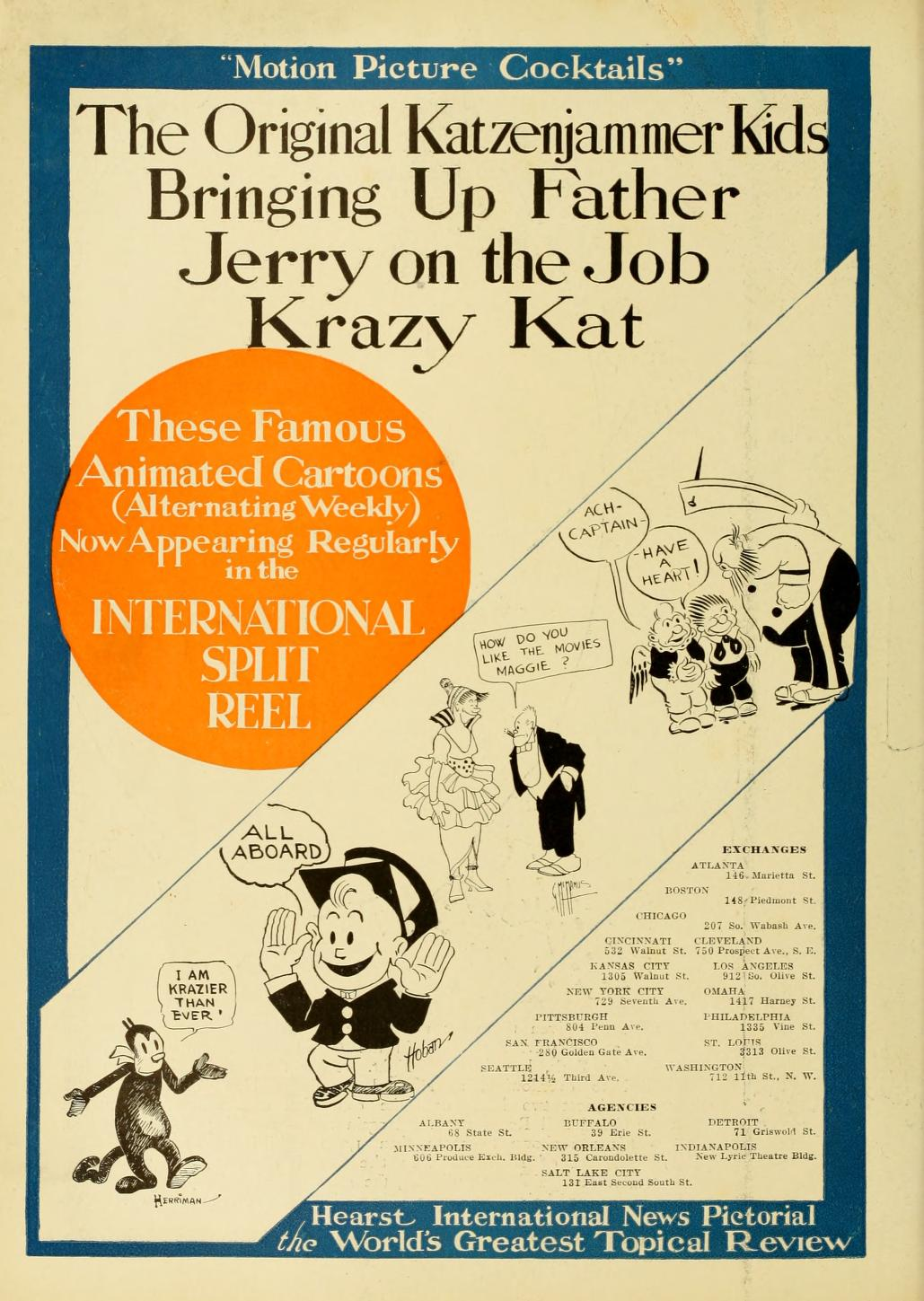
Advertisement (1916)

After George Herriman conceived the Krazy Kat comic strip in 1913, the title character began appearing in animated shorts three years later. From 1916 to 1940, Krazy Kat was featured in 240 films. The following is a list of the cartoons released theatrically, separated by studio.

== International Film Service ==
1916

#	Title	Release date	Director	Film	Notes
1	Introducing Krazy Kat and Ignatz Mouse	February 18, 1916	Gregory La Cava	Considered lost	Considered lost. The first Krazy Kat cartoon.
2	Krazy Kat and Ignatz Mouse Believe in Signs	February 21, 1916	George Herriman	Considered lost	Considered lost. Only the script currently exists.
3	Krazy Kat & Ignatz Mouse Discuss the Letter 'G'	February 25, 1916	Gregory La Cava		
4	Krazy Kat Goes A-Wooing	February 29, 1916	Unknown		
5	Krazy Kat and Ignatz Mouse: A Duet, He Made Me Love Him	March 3, 1916	George Herriman		Also titled "A Duet".
6	Krazy Kat and Ignatz Mouse in Their One-Act Tragedy: "The Tail of the Nude Tail"	March 6, 1916	Unknown	Available clips	Also titled "One-Act Tragedy".
7	Krazy Kat, Bugologist	March 14, 1916	Unknown		
8	Krazy Kat and Ignatz Mouse at the Circus	March 17, 1916	George Herriman		
9	Krazy Kat Demi-Tasse	March 21, 1916	George Herriman	Considered lost	Considered lost.
10	Krazy Kat Invalid	March 27, 1916	Unknown		Also titled "Invalid".
11	Krazy Kat at the Switchboard	April 3, 1916	Unknown	Considered lost	Considered lost.
12	A Tale That is Knot	April 14, 1916	Unknown		Krazy Kat says the N-word in this cartoon.
13	Krazy Kat the Hero	April 14, 1916	Unknown	Considered lost	Considered lost.
14	Krazy Kat to the Rescue	April 14, 1916	Unknown	Considered lost	Considered lost.
15	Krazy Kat at Looney Park	June 17, 1916	Unknown	Not publicly available	
16	A Sad Awakening	June 20, 1916	Unknown	Considered lost	Considered lost.
17	A Tempest in a Paint Pot	July 3, 1916	Unknown	Considered lost	Considered lost.
18	A Grid-Iron Hero	October 9, 1916	Unknown	Not publicly available	
19	The Missing One	November 27, 1916	Unknown	Considered lost	Considered lost. Only the script currently exists.
20	Krazy Kat Takes Little Katrina For an Airing	December 23, 1916	Unknown	Considered lost	Considered lost. Only the script currently exists.
N/A	Krazy's New Bathing Suit	1916	Unknown		A possible reissue of "The Switchboard".

1917

#	Title	Release date	Director	Film	Notes
21	Throwing the Bull	February 4, 1917	Unknown	Considered lost	Considered lost. Only the script currently exists.
22	Roses and Thorns	March 11, 1917	Unknown	Considered lost	Considered lost. Only the script currently exists.
23	Robbers and Thieves	April 12, 1917	Gregory La Cava	Considered lost	Considered lost.
24	The Cook	April 29, 1917	Unknown	Considered lost	Considered lost. Only the script currently exists.
25	Moving Day	May 27, 1917	Unknown	Considered lost	Considered lost. Only the script currently exists.
26	All Is Not Gold That Glitters	June 24, 1917	Unknown	Considered lost	Considered lost. Only the script currently exists.
27	A Krazy Katastrophe	August 5, 1917	Unknown	Considered lost	Final Krazy Kat theatrical short during World War I. Considered lost. Only the script currently exists.

== Bray Studios ==
1920

#	Title	Release date	Director	Film	Notes
28	The Great Cheese Robbery	January 16, 1920	Vernon Stallings		The first Krazy Kat cartoon by Bray Studios.
29	Love's Labor Lost	January 30, 1920	Vernon Stallings		
30	The Best Mouse Loses	March 3, 1920	Vernon Stallings		
31	Kats Is Kats	June 4, 1920	Vernon Stallings	Home film release, missing scenes	Only exists as a shortened home film version.
32	The Chinese Honeymoon	July 3, 1920	Vernon Stallings		
33	A Family Affair	October 25, 1920	Vernon Stallings		

1921

#	Title	Release date	Director	Film	Notes
34	The Hinges on the Bar Room Door	January 8, 1921	Vernon Stallings	Home film release	
35	The Awful Spook	January 21, 1921	Vernon Stallings	Home film release	
36	How I Became Krazy	January 26, 1921	Vernon Stallings	Not publicly available	
37	The Wireless Wire-Walkers	February 26, 1921	Vernon Stallings		The last Krazy Kat cartoon by Bray Studios. The last cartoon to depict Krazy Kat as genderless.

== Winkler Pictures ==
In the first two cartoon series, Krazy was depicted as a genderless feline, similar to the comic strip. From here onward, Krazy is portrayed as a male cat. These were produced by Bill Nolan's studio.

1925

#	Title	Release date	Director	Film	Notes
38	Hot Dogs	October 1, 1925	Bill Nolan	Considered lost	Considered lost.
39	The Smoke Eater	October 15, 1925	Bill Nolan	Considered lost	Considered lost.
40	A Uke-Calamity	November 1, 1925	Bill Nolan	Not publicly available	
41	Bokays and Brickbatz	November 15, 1925	Bill Nolan	Considered lost	Often confused with the 1926 kartoon "Mouse Trapped". Considered lost.
42	The Hair Raiser	November 15, 1925	Bill Nolan	Considered lost	Considered lost.
43	The Flight That Failed	November 15, 1925	Bill Nolan	Considered lost	Considered lost.
44	The New Champ	November 30, 1925	Jack King	Considered lost	Considered lost.
45	Jams and Gems	December 1, 1925	Bill Nolan	Considered lost	Often mistitled "James and Gems". Considered lost.
46	Monkey Business	December 15, 1925	Bill Nolan	Home film release, missing scenes	
47	Pie-Eyed Pie	1925	Unknown	Lost (?)	May be a variant title for "Monkey Business". Only listed in the Motion Picture News.

1926

#	Title	Release date	Director	Film	Notes
48	Battling For Barleycorn	January 1, 1926	Bill Nolan	Considered lost	Considered lost.
49	A Punctured Romance	January 15, 1926	Bill Nolan	Home film release, missing scenes	Often mistitled "A Pickled Romance" or "A Picked Romance". Also titled "In Love Again".
50	The Ghost Fakir	February 1, 1926	Bill Nolan	Considered lost	Considered lost.
51	Puss in Boots	February 15, 1926	Bill Nolan	Considered lost	Sometimes mistitled "Puss and Boots". Considered lost.
52	Sucker Game	February 15, 1926	Bill Nolan	Considered lost	Considered lost.
53	Back To Backing	March 1, 1926	Bill Nolan	Home film release, missing scenes	Sometimes titled "Back to Batching" and "The Burglar".
54	Double Crossed	March 15, 1926	Bill Nolan	Considered lost	Considered lost.
55	Scents and Nonsense	April 1, 1926	Bill Nolan		
56	The Feather Pushers	April 15, 1926	Bill Nolan		Sometimes mistitled "Feather Duster".
57	Cops the Suey	May 1, 1926	Bill Nolan	Considered lost	Often mistitled "Cops Suey". Considered lost.
58	In the Movies	August 15, 1926	Bill Nolan	Considered lost	Considered lost.

== R-C Pictures/Winkler Pictures ==
Shorts begin to be outsourced to Ben Harrison and Manny Gould's studio.

1926

#	Title	Release date	Director	Film	Notes
59	The Chicken Chaser	September 2, 1926	Bill Nolan	Considered lost	Considered lost. Only the script currently exists.
60	East Is Best	September 22, 1926	Bill Nolan	Considered lost	Considered lost. Only the script currently exists.
61	Jimmy's Whiskers	October 1, 1926	Bill Nolan	Considered lost	Sometimes cited as "Jiminy Whiskers". Considered lost.
62	Shore Enough	October 11, 1926	Bill Nolan	Considered lost	Considered lost. Only the script currently exists.
63	Watery Gravy	October 15, 1926	Bill Nolan	Considered lost	Often mistitled "Watery Grave". Considered lost. Only the script currently exists.
64	Mouse Trapped	October 15, 1926	Bill Nolan	Home film release, missing scenes	Also titled "Krazy Kat's Mouse Trap" and "Bokays and Brickbatz", not to be confused with the 1925 kartoon of the same name.
65	A Farmyard Frolic	1926	Bill Nolan		Also titled "A Barnyard Frolic" and "The Frolics That Finished". Released in the UK as a two-part serial. The original release date is unknown.
66	Fowl Play	1926	Bill Nolan	Considered lost	Considered lost. The original release date is unknown.
67	The Pole-Lander	1926	Bill Nolan	Not publicly available	Also titled "Searching for Santa!" and "Santa Claws Our Pet". Released in the UK as a two-part serial. The original release date is unknown.
68	Teeth for Two	1926	Bill Nolan	Home film release	Also titled "Dentist Love". The original release date is unknown.
69	Cheese It	November 8, 1926	Bill Nolan	Considered lost	Considered lost. Only the script currently exists.
70	Dots and Dashes	November 22, 1926	Bill Nolan	Considered lost	Considered lost. Only the script currently exists.
71	Gold Struck	December 6, 1926	Bill Nolan	Considered lost	Considered lost. Only the script currently exists.
72	The Wrong Queue	December 20, 1926	Bill Nolan	Considered lost	Considered lost. Only the script currently exists.

1927

#	Title	Release date	Director	Film	Notes
73	Horse Play	January 3, 1927	Bill Nolan	Considered lost	Considered lost. Only the script currently exists.
74	Busy Birds	January 17, 1927	Bill Nolan	Considered lost	Considered lost. Only the script currently exists.
75	Sharps and Flats	January 31, 1927	Bill Nolan	Considered lost	Considered lost. Only the script currently exists.
76	Kiss Crossed	February 14, 1927	Bill Nolan	Considered lost	Considered lost. Only the script currently exists.
77	A Fool's Errand	February 28, 1927	Bill Nolan	Considered lost	Considered lost. Only the script currently exists.
78	Stomach Trouble	March 14, 1927	Bill Nolan		Also titled "The Crazy Cat in an Empty Stomach".
79	The Rug Fiend	March 28, 1927	Bill Nolan	Considered lost	Considered lost. Only the script currently exists.
80	Hire a Hall	April 11, 1927	John Terry	Considered lost	Considered lost.
81	Don Go On	April 23, 1927	Bill Nolan	Considered lost	Considered lost. Only the script currently exists.
82	Burnt Up	May 9, 1927	Bill Nolan	Considered lost	Considered lost. Only the script currently exists.
83	Night Owl	May 23, 1927	Bill Nolan	Considered lost	Considered lost. Only the script currently exists.
84	On the Trail	June 6, 1927	Bill Nolan	Considered lost	Considered lost. Only the script currently exists.
85	Passing the Hat	June 20, 1927	Bill Nolan	Considered lost	Considered lost. Only the script currently exists.
86	Best Wishes	July 4, 1927	Bill Nolan	Considered lost	Considered lost. Only the script currently exists.
87	Black and White	July 10, 1927	Bill Nolan	Considered lost	Considered lost. Only the script currently exists.
88	Wild Rivals	July 18, 1927	Bill Nolan	Considered lost	Considered lost. Only the script currently exists.
89	Bee Cause	August 15, 1927	Ben Harrison & Manny Gould	Considered lost	The first Krazy Kat kartoon made by Ben Harrison & Manny Gould's Studio. Considered lost. Only the script currently exists.
90	Skinny	August 29, 1927	Ben Harrison & Manny Gould	Considered lost	Considered lost. Only the script currently exists.

== Paramount-Famous/Winkler Pictures ==
Ben Harrison and Manny Gould's studio began making Krazy Kat shorts for Mintz by March of 1927 and by the time they switched distributors to Paramount they completely took over from Bill Nolan.

1927

#	Title	Release date	Director	Film	Notes
91	Sealing Whacks	August 1, 1927	Ben Harrison & Manny Gould	Considered lost	Considered lost. Only the script currently exists.
92	Tired Wheels	August 13, 1927	Ben Harrison & Manny Gould	Considered lost	Considered lost. Only the script currently exists.
93	Web Feet	August 27, 1927	Ben Harrison & Manny Gould	Considered lost	Considered lost. Only the script currently exists.
94	School Daze	September 10, 1927	Ben Harrison & Manny Gould	Considered lost	Considered lost. Only the script currently exists.
95	Rail Rode	September 24, 1927	Ben Harrison & Manny Gould	Missing scenes	
96	Aero Nuts	October 8, 1927	Ben Harrison & Manny Gould	Missing scenes	
97	Topsy Turvy	October 22, 1927	Ben Harrison & Manny Gould	Considered lost	Considered lost. Only the script currently exists.
98	Pie Curs	November 5, 1927	Ben Harrison & Manny Gould	Considered lost	Considered lost. Only the script currently exists.
99	For Crime's Sake	November 19, 1927	Ben Harrison & Manny Gould	Considered lost	Considered lost. Only the script currently exists.
100	Milk Made	December 3, 1927	Ben Harrison & Manny Gould	Considered lost	Considered lost. Only the script currently exists.
101	The Stork Exchange	December 17, 1927	Ben Harrison & Manny Gould		
102	Grid Ironed	December 31, 1927	Ben Harrison & Manny Gould	Considered lost	Considered lost. Only the script currently exists.

1928

#	Title	Release date	Director	Film	Notes
103	Pig Styles	January 14, 1928	Ben Harrison & Manny Gould	Considered lost	Considered lost. Only the script currently exists.
104	Shadow Theory	January 28, 1928	Ben Harrison & Manny Gould	Considered lost	Considered lost. Only the script currently exists.
105	Ice Boxed	February 11, 1928	Ben Harrison & Manny Gould	Considered lost	Considered lost. Only the script currently exists.
106	A Hunger Stroke	February 25, 1928	Ben Harrison & Manny Gould	Considered lost	Considered lost. Only the script currently exists.
107	Wired and Fired	March 10, 1928	Ben Harrison & Manny Gould	Considered lost	Considered lost. Only the script currently exists.
108	Love Sunk	March 24, 1928	Ben Harrison & Manny Gould	Considered lost	Considered lost. Only the script currently exists.
109	Tong Tied	April 7, 1928	Ben Harrison & Manny Gould	Considered lost	Considered lost. Only the script currently exists.
110	A Bum Steer	April 21, 1928	Ben Harrison & Manny Gould	Considered lost	Considered lost. Only the script currently exists.
111	Gold Bricks	May 5, 1928	Ben Harrison & Manny Gould	Considered lost	Considered lost. Only the script currently exists.
112	The Long Count	May 19, 1928	Ben Harrison & Manny Gould	Considered lost	Considered lost. Only the script currently exists.
113	The Patent Medicine Kid	June 2, 1928	Ben Harrison & Manny Gould	Considered lost	Considered lost. Only the script currently exists.
114	Stage Coached	June 16, 1928	Ben Harrison & Manny Gould	Not publicly available	
115	The Rain Dropper	June 30, 1928	Ben Harrison & Manny Gould	Considered lost	Considered lost. Only the script currently exists.
116	A Companionate Mirage	July 14, 1928	Ben Harrison & Manny Gould	Considered lost	Considered lost. Only the script currently exists.
117	News Reeling	August 4, 1928	Ben Harrison & Manny Gould	Considered lost	Considered lost. Only the script currently exists.
118	Baby Feud	August 16, 1928	Ben Harrison & Manny Gould	Considered lost	Considered lost. Only the script currently exists.
119	Sea Sword	September 5, 1928	Ben Harrison & Manny Gould	Considered lost	Considered lost. Only the script currently exists.
120	The Show Vote	September 15, 1928	Ben Harrison & Manny Gould	Not publicly available	
121	The Phantom Trail	September 29, 1928	Ben Harrison & Manny Gould	Considered lost	Considered lost. Only the script currently exists.
122	Come Easy, Go Slow	October 15, 1928	Ben Harrison & Manny Gould	Considered lost	Considered lost. Only the script currently exists.
123	Beaches and Scream	October 29, 1928	Ben Harrison & Manny Gould	Considered lost	Considered lost. Only the script currently exists.
124	Nicked Nags	November 9, 1928	Ben Harrison & Manny Gould	Considered lost	Considered lost. Only the script currently exists.
125	Liar Bird	November 23, 1928	Ben Harrison & Manny Gould	Considered lost	Considered lost. Only the script currently exists.
126	Still Waters	December 7, 1928	Ben Harrison & Manny Gould	Considered lost	Considered lost. Only the script currently exists.
127	Night Owls	December 22, 1928	Ben Harrison & Manny Gould	Considered lost	Considered lost. Only the script currently exists.

1929

#	Title	Release date	Director	Film	Notes
128	Cow Belles	January 5, 1929	Ben Harrison & Manny Gould	Considered lost	Considered lost. Only the script currently exists.
129	Hospitalities	January 18, 1929	Ben Harrison & Manny Gould	Considered lost	Considered lost. Only the script currently exists.
130	Reduced Weights	February 1, 1929	Ben Harrison & Manny Gould	Considered lost	Considered lost. Only the script currently exists.
131	Flying Yeast	February 15, 1929	Ben Harrison & Manny Gould	Considered lost	Considered lost. Only the script currently exists.
132	Vanishing Screams	March 1, 1929	Ben Harrison & Manny Gould	Considered lost	Considered lost. Only the script currently exists.
133	A Joint Affair	March 15, 1929	Ben Harrison & Manny Gould	Considered lost	Considered lost. Only the script currently exists.
134	Sheep Skinned	March 19, 1929	Ben Harrison & Manny Gould	Considered lost	Considered lost. Only the script currently exists.
135	The Lone Shark	April 13, 1929	Ben Harrison & Manny Gould	Considered lost	The first Krazy Kat kartoon with synchronised sound. Considered lost. Only the script currently exists.
136	Torrid Toreadors	April 27, 1929	Ben Harrison & Manny Gould	Considered lost	Considered lost. Only the script currently exists.
137	Golf Socks	May 11, 1929	Ben Harrison & Manny Gould	Considered lost	Considered lost. Only the script currently exists.
138	Petting Larceny	May 25, 1929	Ben Harrison & Manny Gould	Considered lost	Considered lost. Only the script currently exists.
139	Hat Aches	June 8, 1929	Ben Harrison & Manny Gould	Considered lost	Considered lost. Only the script currently exists.
140	Fur Peace	June 22, 1929	Ben Harrison & Manny Gould	Considered lost	Considered lost. Only the script currently exists.
141	Auto Suggestion	July 6, 1929	Ben Harrison & Manny Gould	Considered lost	Considered lost. Only the script currently exists.
142	Sleepy Holler	July 20, 1929	Ben Harrison & Manny Gould		Only the ending is publicly available. The final Paramount Krazy Kat kartoon and the last silent Krazy Kat cartoon.

== Columbia Pictures/Screen Gems ==
By this period, the Krazy Kat shorts started using sound. Ben Harrison and Manny Gould helmed the series together until they briefly split for the 1931-1932 season. After Columbia Pictures decided to decrease Gould's and Harrison's (and Sid Marcus' and Dick Huemer's) wages on account that their cartoons were unprofitable, they left the studio and their crew took over. All would return (except for Huemer who went to Disney). Allen Rose would be given the series in 1936 as Harrison and Gould focused on the Color Rhapsodies. Due to waning popularity, the Krazy Kat series ended in 1939, but he would appear in two more shorts in the Fables and Phantasies series.

1929

#	Title	Release date	Director	Film	Notes
143	Ratskin	August 15, 1929	Ben Harrison & Manny Gould		The first Krazy Kat cartoon by Columbia Pictures.
144	Canned Music	September 12, 1929	Ben Harrison & Manny Gould	Not publicly available	
145	Port Whines	October 10, 1929	Ben Harrison & Manny Gould		
146	Sole Mates	November 7, 1929	Ben Harrison & Manny Gould	The publicly available fragment of the soundtrack	Only a fragment of the soundtrack is publicly available.
147	Farm Relief	December 30, 1929	Ben Harrison & Manny Gould		

1930

#	Title	Release date	Director	Film	Notes
148	The Kat's Meow	January 2, 1930	Ben Harrison & Manny Gould	Not publicly available	
149	Spookeasy	January 30, 1930	Ben Harrison & Manny Gould	Not publicly available	
150	Slow Beau	February 27, 1930	Ben Harrison & Manny Gould		The first Krazy Kat kartoon produced by Columbia Pictures.
151	Desert Sunk	March 27, 1930	Ben Harrison & Manny Gould	Not publicly available	
152	An Old Flame	April 24, 1930	Ben Harrison & Manny Gould	Not publicly available	
153	Alaskan Knights	May 23, 1930	Ben Harrison & Manny Gould		Sometimes titled "Animal Rhythm".
154	Jazz Rhythm	June 19, 1930	Ben Harrison & Manny Gould		The first cartoon that depicted Krazy Kat wearing gloves.
155	Honolulu Wiles	July 17, 1930	Ben Harrison & Manny Gould		The first appearance of Krazy's girlfriend, Kitty Kat.
156	Cinderella	August 14, 1930	Ben Harrison & Manny Gould	Not publicly available	
157	The Bandmaster	September 8, 1930	Ben Harrison & Manny Gould	TV release	
158	The Apache Kid	October 9, 1930	Ben Harrison & Manny Gould		
159	Lambs Will Gamble	November 1, 1930	Ben Harrison & Manny Gould	TV release	Titled "Lambs Will Gambol" for TV release.
160	The Little Trail	December 3, 1930	Ben Harrison & Manny Gould	TV release	

1931

#	Title	Release date	Director	Notes
161	Taken for a Ride	January 3, 1931	Ben Harrison & Manny Gould	
162	Rodeo Dough	February 13, 1931	Ben Harrison & Manny Gould	
163	Swiss Movements	April 4, 1931	Ben Harrison & Manny Gould	
164	Disarmament Conference	April 27, 1931	Ben Harrison & Manny Gould	
165	Soda Poppa	May 29, 1931	Ben Harrison & Manny Gould	
166	The Stork Market	July 11, 1931	Ben Harrison & Manny Gould	A remake of the 1927 cartoon "The Stork Exchange".
167	Svengarlic	August 3, 1931	Ben Harrison & Manny Gould	
168	Weenie Roast	September 14, 1931	Ben Harrison & Manny Gould	
169	Bars and Stripes	October 15, 1931	Manny Gould	
170	Hash House Blues	November 2, 1931	Manny Gould	
171	The Restless Sax	December 1, 1931	Manny Gould	

1932

#	Title	Release date	Director	Notes
172	Piano Mover	January 4, 1932	Ben Harrison	
173	Love Krazy	January 30, 1932	Manny Gould	
174	Hollywood Goes Krazy	February 13, 1932	Manny Gould	Also titled "Hollywood Goes Crazy".
175	What a Knight	March 14, 1932	Manny Gould	
176	Soldier Old Man	April 2, 1932	Manny Gould	
177	The Birth of Jazz	April 13, 1932	Ben Harrison	
178	The Ritzy Hotel	May 9, 1932	Manny Gould	
179	Hic-Cups the Champ	May 28, 1932	Manny Gould	
180	The Paper Hanger	June 21, 1932	Ben Harrison	
181	Light house Keeping	August 15, 1932	Ben Harrison	
182	Seeing Stars	September 12, 1932	Ben Harrison & Manny Gould	
183	Prosperity Blues	October 8, 1932	Ben Harrison & Manny Gould	
184	The Crystal Gazebo	November 7, 1932	Ben Harrison & Manny Gould	Redrawn colorized in the 1970s.
185	The Minstrel Show	November 21, 1932	Ben Harrison & Manny Gould	
186	Snow Time	November 30, 1932	Ben Harrison & Manny Gould	In a Krazytoons reissue, it is titled "Alaskan Daze".

1933

#	Title	Release date	Director	Notes
187	Wedding Bells	January 10, 1933	Ben Harrison & Manny Gould	
188	The Medicine Show	February 7, 1933	Ben Harrison & Manny Gould	
189	Wooden Shoes	February 25, 1933	Ben Harrison & Manny Gould	
190	Bunnies and Bonnets	March 29, 1933	Ben Harrison & Manny Gould	
191	The Broadway Malady	April 18, 1933	Ben Harrison & Manny Gould	
192	Russian Dressing	May 1, 1933	Ben Harrison & Manny Gould	
193	House Cleaning	June 1, 1933	Rudy Zamora	
194	Antique Antics	June 14, 1933	Ben Harrison & Manny Gould	
195	Out of the Ether	September 5, 1933	Ben Harrison & Manny Gould	
196	Whacks Museum	September 29, 1933	Harry Love & Al Eugster	
197	Krazy Spooks	October 13, 1933	Rudy Zamora & Harry Love	
198	Stage Krazy	November 13, 1933	Rudy Zamora & Harry Love	
199	The Bill Poster	November 24, 1933	Harry Love	
200	Curio Shop	December 15, 1933	Harry Love	

1934

#	Title	Release date	Director	Notes
201	The Autograph Hunter	January 5, 1934	Harry Love	
202	Southern Exposure	February 5, 1934	Ben Harrison & Manny Gould	
203	Tom Thumb	February 16, 1934	Harry Love	
204	Cinder Alley	March 9, 1934	Harry Love	
205	Bowery Daze	March 30, 1934	Harry Love	
206	Busy Bus	April 20, 1934	Allen Rose	
207	The Masquerade Party	May 11, 1934	Harry Love	
208	The Trapeze Artist	September 1, 1934	Sid Marcus	The first Krazy Kat cartoon approved by the MPPDA. Redrawn colorized in the 1970s.
209	The Katnips of 1940	October 12, 1934	Ben Harrison	Redrawn colorized in the 1970s.
210	Krazy's Waterloo	November 16, 1934	Ben Harrison	
211	Goofy Gondolas	December 21, 1934	Ben Harrison	

1935

#	Title	Release date	Director	Notes
212	The Bird Man	February 1, 1935	Ben Harrison	
213	The Hotcha Melody	March 15, 1935	Ben Harrison	
214	Peace Conference	April 26, 1935	Ben Harrison	
215	The King's Jester	May 20, 1935	Ben Harrison	
216	Garden Gaieties	August 1, 1935	Ben Harrison	
217	A Happy Family	September 27, 1935	Ben Harrison	
218	Kannibal Kapers	December 27, 1935	Ben Harrison	

1936

#	Title	Release date	Director	Notes
219	The Bird Stuffer	February 1, 1936	Sid Marcus	
220	L'il Ainjil	March 19, 1936	Ben Harrison	The sole attempt by Screen Gems to reflect the original comic series.
221	Highway Snobbery	August 9, 1936	Allen Rose	
222	Krazy's Newsreel	October 24, 1936	Allen Rose	
223	The Merry Cafe	December 26, 1936	Allen Rose	Later reissued by Official Films for home use.

1937

#	Title	Release date	Director	Notes
224	The Lyin' Hunter	February 12, 1937	Allen Rose	Redrawn colorized in the 1970s.
225	Krazy's Race of Time	May 6, 1937	Allen Rose	
226	The Masque Raid	June 25, 1937	Allen Rose	
227	Railroad Rhythm	November 20, 1937	Allen Rose	Later reissued by Official Films for home use.

1938

#	Title	Release date	Director	Notes
228	The Sad Little Guinea Pigs	February 22, 1938	Ben Harrison	
229	The Auto Clinic	March 4, 1938	Allen Rose	Later reissued by Official Films for home use.
230	The Little Buckaroo	April 11, 1938	Allen Rose	
231	Krazy Magic	May 20, 1938	Allen Rose	
232	Travel Squawks	July 4, 1938	Allen Rose	
233	Gym Jams	September 9, 1938	Allen Rose	
234	Hot Dogs on Ice	October 21, 1938	Allen Rose	
235	The Lone Mountie	December 10, 1938	Allen Rose	Redrawn colorized in the 1970s.

1939

#	Title	Release date	Director	Notes
236	Krazy's Bear Tale	January 27, 1939	Allen Rose	Later reissued by Official Films for home use.
237	Golf Chumps	April 6, 1939	Allen Rose	The last appearance of Krazy's girlfriend, Kitty Kat.
238	Krazy's Shoe Shop	May 12, 1939	Allen Rose	The final Krazy Kat cartoon in the series.
239	The Little Lost Sheep	October 2, 1939	Allen Rose	The only Krazy Kat cartoon in the Fables series.

1940

#	Title	Release date	Director	Notes
240	The Mouse Exterminator	January 26, 1940	Allen Rose	The only Krazy Kat cartoon in the Phantasy series. The final appearance of Krazy Kat in a theatrical cartoon.
