= Russian Dressing (film) =

- Title card
- Directed by: Manny Gould; Ben Harrison
- Produced by: Charles Mintz
- Music by: Joe DeNat
- Animation by: Al Eugster; Allen Rose; Harry Love
- Color process: Black and white
- Production company: Charles Mintz Studio
- Distributed by: Columbia Pictures
- Release date: May 1, 1933
- Running time: 6:16
- Language: English

Russian Dressing is a 1933 short theatrical cartoon by Columbia Pictures, featuring Krazy Kat.

== Plot ==
Krazy is on a horse-drawn sleigh, riding through the countryside, and playing a balalaika. He then stops at a house and sings the Russian song Dark Eyes to serenade someone. Coming out of the house is Krazy's spaniel girlfriend. They would then walk around and sing the song together.

Krazy and the spaniel enter the house, which turns out to be a tavern, where they do the Cossack dance. It is a pleasant experience for them. Meanwhile, a hefty hog drinks an entire bottle of vodka, thus becoming intoxicated and psychologically corrupted. The hog nabs Krazy and tells him to blow up "the palace" with a round black bomb. Krazy at first resists, but is compelled by the hog who is heavily armed.

Krazy jigs out of the tavern while holding the bomb. He tries to hurl it at a distance but animals in the vicinity, such as dogs and birds, keep throwing it back. Not liking what the cat is doing, the hog engages with Krazy in volleying the bomb back and forth. The bomb finally detonates at the hog who then runs off in a barrel. Krazy and the spaniel go on to celebrate by doing the Cossack dance outside and kissing.

== See also ==
- Krazy Kat filmography
