= The Minstrel Show (film) =

1932 film

- Directed by: Manny Gould; Ben Harrison
- Story by: Manny Gould
- Produced by: Charles Mintz
- Music by: Joe DeNat
- Animation by: Al Eugster; Preston Blair
- Color process: Black and white
- Production company: Charles Mintz Studio
- Distributed by: Columbia Pictures
- Release date: November 21, 1932
- Running time: 6:40
- Language: English

The Minstrel Show is a 1932 short animated film by Columbia Pictures starring the comic strip character Krazy Kat.

== Plot ==
Krazy is a stage actor who leads a group of performers wearing blackface. The stage acts include playing musical instruments, dancing, and telling jokes.

After a few acts, one of the performers does some scat singing. The audience, however, does not find the performance appealing as they slingshot a slice of watermelon into the performer's mouth, thus changing his singing style. The audience finds it more fun to toss things are they hurl more fruits onto the performers.

When Krazy does his second solo act, the audience slingshots a large can of tomatoes at him. Krazy does not bother by the deed as he turns the can into a kilt, and the can's contents into bagpipes. Once more, the audience tosses another object onto the stage, which is an egg and lands on Krazy's head, knocking him unconscious, before dropping onto the stage floor where it breaks open. Strangely, a skunk emerges from the eggshell. The skunk unleashes fumes, causing everybody at the theater to leave. Krazy wakes up but is still dazed from the egg projectile.

== See also ==
- Krazy Kat filmography
