= Disarmament Conference (film) =

1931 film

- Directed by: Manny Gould; Ben Harrison
- Story by: Ben Harrison
- Produced by: Charles Mintz
- Music by: Joe DeNat
- Animation by: Manny Gould
- Color process: Black and white
- Production company: Charles Mintz Studio
- Distributed by: Columbia Pictures
- Release date: April 27, 1931
- Running time: 7:34
- Language: English

Disarmament Conference is a 1931 short animated film distributed by Columbia Pictures, and part of the long-running film series featuring Krazy Kat.

== Plot ==
Krazy, wearing a safari hat, is driving a car, and traveling through the African jungles. Suddenly his vehicle is being attacked by projectiles from within the area. It appears that there is a battle involving various animals. The animals fight by using their natural attributes (such as monkeys hurling coconuts, and skunks using their strong foul odor). Although his car is destroyed, Krazy is unharmed and tries to take cover. Having enough of the frenzy, Krazy tells the animals to stop and gather around. As they come to him, Krazy presents a treaty signed by him, stating that the animals should give up their violent ways, and therefore live peacefully. The animals are persuaded as they disarm themselves (such as a lion removing his choppers, and an elephant removing his tusks). They, along with Krazy, then celebrate, in a song and dance.

Not all the animals received Krazy's message. The hornets from a tree notice peace going around. The hornets, however, see this as an opportunity to retaliate as they come out from the nest in a large number before attacking the other animals. The frightened animals take shelter in a cave, and seal its entrance. Krazy, who is still outside, tries to get in. Although someone opens up, that animal just pushes him away. Krazy then resorts to fleeing on a floating rock in a river, but to his surprise, the rock is actually a crocodile.

== Song ==
The song Happy Days Are Here Again is featured in the film. It would later be used again in Seeing Stars and Prosperity Blues.

== See also ==
- Krazy Kat filmography
