= Wedding Bells (1933 film) =

1933 film by Manny Gould

- Directed by: Manny Gould; Ben Harrison
- Story by: Ben Harrison
- Produced by: Charles Mintz
- Music by: Joe de Nat
- Animation by: Al Eugster; Preston Blair
- Color process: Black and white
- Production company: Charles Mintz Studio
- Distributed by: Columbia Pictures
- Release date: January 10, 1933
- Running time: 6:14
- Language: English

Wedding Bells is a 1933 short animated film distributed by Columbia Pictures, and one of many featuring Krazy Kat.

== Plot ==
One morning in a house, Krazy is sleeping in his bed. He then wakes up to the chirping of the birds, and acknowledges that today is his wedding day. Upon getting up from bed, he kisses every photograph of his spaniel girlfriend. He then heads to the bathroom to shave and shower.

The scene then moves to another house where the spaniel is ironing her long ears. The spaniel then heads to a window where instead of donning a wedding gown, she simply takes out one of the curtains, and places it on her head like a veil. Momentarily, Krazy shows up outside wearing a tux, a top hat, and in a car. Krazy elevates a seat from his car which the spaniel boards from the window. The two then set off.

Krazy and the spaniel make it to the church. The wedding is hyped up by dancing turkeys and cattle. When Krazy and the spaniel gather in front of the priest, the priest does not say much other than singing "do-do-do…" in a jazzy fashion. The priest, however, completes the wedding by tying together the tails of the two sweethearts.

Moments after leaving the church, Krazy and the spaniel drive through the countryside road to look for a new home. They then pick two heart-shaped houses. The two houses become animated and merged into a single house before the cat and dog occupy it.

== See also ==
- Krazy Kat filmography
