= Krazy's Waterloo =

- Directed by: Ben Harrison
- Produced by: Charles Mintz
- Music by: Joe DeNat
- Animation by: Manny Gould; Allen Rose; Harry Love
- Color process: Black and white
- Production company: Charles Mintz Studio
- Distributed by: Columbia Pictures
- Release date: November 16, 1934
- Running time: 7:02
- Language: English

Krazy's Waterloo is a 1934 short theatrical cartoon by Columbia Pictures, and one of the many films featuring Krazy Kat. The film is loosely based on the times of French emperor Napoleon Bonaparte. It is also perhaps the only film where Krazy is cast as someone other than himself.

The film is a humorous depiction of the French invasion of Russia (1812). It depicts the Russian army annihilating their French opponents and blasting Napoleon himself back to France.

== Plot ==
The cartoon starts with Napoleon (Krazy Kat) looking at a portrait of his human counterpart. After adding numerous countries to his empire as result of winning battles, he then sets sights on Russia. Just before leaving and going there, Napoleon engages in a warm farewell meeting with his wife Josephine who is also a cat. When the feline emperor and his handful of soldiers march in the street, bystanders cheer for him.

After a long walk, Napoleon and his men set foot on a snowy terrain of Russia. The local militia immediately notices his approach, and therefore start hurling round bombs, prompting Napoleon's battalion to enter a bunker. Using the cannon which he brought along, the feline emperor manages to land some hits. The local forces retaliate with a rapid-firing gun and a cannon which they also have. One by one, Napoleon's soldiers are taken out. A Russian fighter then approaches the bunker and goes on to chase Napoleon across the country. Following a long run, that Russian fighter tosses a bomb at Napoleon. The blast is so powerful that the French leader is sent several miles upward.

Upon being bested in battle and blown away by the enemy's explosive, Napoleon finds himself landing in a boat in a harbor back in France. To his surprise, he is greeted by a pack of bystanders, including his wife. They sing him a farewell song, thinking he is still departing for battle. Annoyed by this, Napoleon oars himself out of sight.

== Differences from the actual events ==
The famous defeat of the real life Napoleon took place in a region called Waterloo which is in Belgium. Also, the army that bested him there was British.

The real life Napoleon also invaded Russia, but contrary to the cartoon, he won that battle.

== See also ==
- Krazy Kat filmography
