= A Happy Family =

- Story by: Ben Harrison
- Produced by: Charles Mintz
- Music by: Joe DeNat
- Animation by: Manny Gould; Allen Rose; Harry Love
- Color process: Black and white
- Production company: Charles Mintz Studio
- Distributed by: Columbia Pictures
- Release date: September 27, 1935
- Running time: 6:41
- Language: English

A Happy Family is a 1935 short animated film by Columbia Pictures, and part of the Krazy Kat series.

== Plot ==
Krazy and Kitty Kat are in a house looking at an album of Krazy's relatives. Krazy receives a telegram from his Uncle Egbert who is coming to visit as well as bringing some relatives. Several moments later, the uncle's car arrives. Although the car is only the size of a station wagon, hundreds of cats come out and file into Krazy's house. Finally, Uncle Egbert shows up and courteously greets Krazy, as well as introducing him to Cousin Katfish (a character from the Krazy Kat comic strip, though drawn here as a taller figure).

At first, things appear okay at home when the older cats are just having a meal, but Krazy becomes dismayed when the kittens do some roughhousing. Krazy tries to intervene but the kittens' troublesome antics keep him at bay. Playing kittens sets a fire, and Krazy's home is ruined. Krazy is forced to take shelter in a dog house.

== See also ==
- Krazy Kat filmography
