= Snow Time =

1932 film

- Directed by: Ben Harrison; Manny Gould
- Produced by: Charles Mintz
- Music by: Joe DeNat
- Animation by: Allen Rose; Harry Love
- Color process: Black and white
- Production company: Charles Mintz Studio
- Distributed by: Columbia Pictures
- Release date: November 30, 1932
- Running time: 5:58
- Language: English

Snow Time, also known as Alaska Daze in some reissues, is a 1932 animated short film distributed by Columbia Pictures and a part of the Krazy Kat series.

== Plot ==
It is winter time and Krazy is in his horse-drawn sleigh, running through the snowy outdoors. Next, he stops over at the house of his spaniel girlfriend. Krazy then calls and invites her to go out with him. Showing herself through a window, the spaniel discloses she cannot come outside because her door is blocked by thick snow. In this, Krazy and his horse goes on to clear the doorway. In a very short time, the impeding snow has been removed, and the spaniel finally steps out. They then head off in the sleigh.

Krazy and the spaniel arrive at their destination, the frozen lake. They then put on their ice skates and set foot on the ice. For several moments, things are going very smooth for them. Their movements are fluent and they never stumble into things. This is until Krazy crashes into a wooden barrel and starts to lose control. He then overshoots the edge of the lake and gets himself into a snowy slope. As he tumbles down the slope, Krazy becomes covered in snow and immediately becomes a large rampaging snowball. The snowball bashes a cabin and rolls into a barn where it runs over the farm animals. Finally, it spatters onto a larger house, and Krazy is free at last. Just nearby him is the spaniel who is relieved to know he is unharmed. Without further ado, they continue looking for ways to spend time in the frosty landscape.

== Availability ==
- Columbia Cartoon Collection: Volumes 3 and 12

== See also ==
- Krazy Kat filmography
