= Port Whines =

1929 animated short film

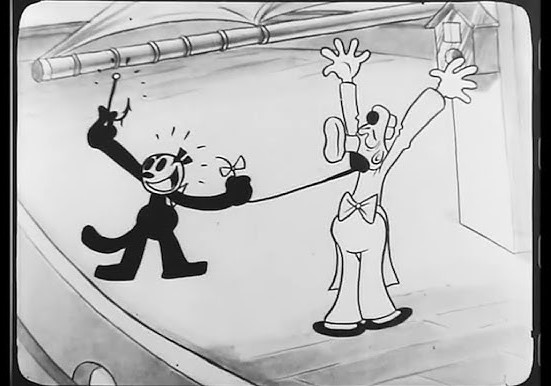
- Screenshot
- Directed by: Ben Harrison; Manny Gould
- Story by: Ben Harrison
- Produced by: Charles Mintz
- Music by: Joe DeNat
- Animation by: Allen Rose; Harry Love; Friz Freleng; Arthur Davis
- Color process: Black and white
- Production company: Charles Mintz Studio
- Distributed by: Columbia Pictures
- Release date: October 10, 1929
- Running time: 6:31
- Language: English

Port Whines is a 1929 animated short film by the Columbia Pictures and the 145th Krazy Kat cartoon.

== Plot ==
The short film

The story starts with a galleon sailing across the ocean. On it, there are several seamen having fun and Krazy is one of them. Krazy's routines include mopping the main deck, just like a goat on the ship. After cleaning, he goes for a stroll around the vessel. As he continues moving, Krazy accidentally bumps into the captain who is quite irritable.

The captain starts chasing Krazy, but he slips on a soap bar and get airborne. Very quickly, the other seamen rats come in and cushion his fall putting their tails together. Then, the seamen rats make the captain bounce on their tails, like a trampoline, and, unintentionally, hurl the captain off the ship's side. Remembering how unpleasantly ill-tempered their leader is, however, they and Krazy begin to celebrate the deed with some music and dancing.

In a kitchen leveled with the main deck, an Oriental chef was trying to fry fish on skillets but the fish dance unexpectedly. The chef does not like this and complains to them, but they escape from the kitchen. The fish bumps into Krazy and, knowing that the chef was cooking them, the cat does not like that they escaped the kitchen. Krazy ties them to one of the masts of the ship and pulls them, making the sound of a bassoon. Then, Krazy pulls the string of a cuckoo clock and the cuckoo appears with a gun and shoots the fish, leaving them skinless, and the cat uses their bone as a xylophone. The chef comes out of the kitchen and gets angry about the situation of the fish. The chef complains to Krazy and the cat puts a fish hook in the chef's big hair strand and uses it like a fishing rod. Moments later, something is caught, and Krazy starts to reel in. It turns out what is pulled in is the captain. The chef, who is very angry about what Krazy did to him, tries to punch the cat but misses as he ducks. Instead the captain is the one struck; the captain then hits back in a similar fashion. For the rest of the film, the captain and the chef punch each other repeatedly. As they do that, Krazy gives them both a cheeky grin and the cartoon irises to an end.

== Availability ==
- Columbia Cartoon Collection: Volume 1

== See also ==
- Krazy Kat filmography
