= Ratskin =

1929 film

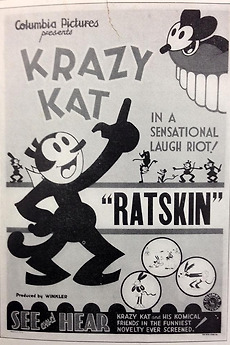
- Theatrical release poster
- Directed by: Manny Gould; Ben Harrison
- Produced by: Charles Mintz
- Starring: Billy Murray
- Music by: Rosario Bourdon
- Color process: B&W
- Production company: Winkler Pictures (Note: As Winker Productions)
- Distributed by: Columbia Pictures
- Release date: August 15, 1929
- Running time: 8:29
- Language: English

Ratskin is a 1929 animated cartoon released by Columbia Pictures starring Krazy Kat. It is the first cartoon to be released by Columbia.

== Plot ==
The short film

While Krazy, his horse and his wagon sleep, Krazy Kat wakes up because of his horse's snore and, thanks to the horse's snoring, Krazy realizes that they are late for hunting time. They wake up and Krazy Kat hunts for one turkey. He tries to shoot with his gun a turkey, but his attempt fails. He decides to look for another one, and finds and shoots with his gun what he thinks is turkey, but turns out to be a Native American instead. The Native American chases Krazy and gets caught. An anamorphic pole ties Krazy up, and the Native Americans light a fire below him. Krazy manages to escape from the Native Americans, but then the Native Americans start shooting arrows at him. Krazy finds his gun and uses it as a record player, and the Native Americans start dancing. A female Native American wants to kiss Krazy, but he hits her with his gun instead. All of the Native Americans get angry and try to get Krazy, but Krazy escapes from the crowd, dismantles his gun, and uses the Native Americans (now huddled in a circle, not realizing Krazy had escaped) as a record player.

== Music ==
The music in the title sequence is called Me-Ow, a 1918 composition by Mel B. Kaufman. It would be used in some subsequent short films of the series until Slow Beau.

== Availability ==
Ratskin has yet to be released on any home video format. It does, however, circulate through a bootleg recording of an ASIFA screening, the only time the cartoon was publicly shown since its original release.

== See also ==
- Krazy Kat filmography
