= Hash House Blues =

- Directed by: Manny Gould
- Produced by: Charles Mintz
- Music by: Joe DeNat
- Animation by: Allen Rose; Preston Blair
- Color process: Black and white
- Production company: Screen Gems
- Distributed by: Columbia Pictures
- Release date: November 2, 1931
- Running time: 5:50
- Language: English

Hash House Blues, also spelled Hash-House Blues in some reissues, is a 1931 short animated film from Columbia Pictures, and one of many in the long-running series of films featuring Krazy Kat.

== Plot ==
The film opens with Krazy who seems to be riding a luxury car, and wearing a top hat like a high-class individual. Moments later, it turns out he is walking in the sidewalk, and not really riding the vehicle which moves forward past the screen. Krazy proceeds to a fancy restaurant.

Krazy enters the restaurant not as a patron as his outfit suggests, but as a waiter. In the kitchen, the chef assigns him to fix a few things, but a pesky fly causes him to mess up a bit. Krazy is able to take down the fly by opening a wheel of limburger whose scent causes the insect to collapse.

Krazy enters the dining area to tend the customers. Some acts of assistance include giving goggles to a client eating grapefruit, and helping a piglet get some food from a platter being hogged by other swine at the table. He finds his spaniel girlfriend, who is the entertainer, playing piano. The piano is animated and is having a painful key like someone having a toothache. Krazy can extract the painful key. The spaniel resumes playing her instrument as normal despite one key missing. Krazy continues tending and even entertaining the customers with a dance. When he serves a roasted bird to a plump lady, that lady is unsatisfied for some reason and tears the bill to pieces. The lady strikes Krazy with the food, causing Krazy to roll back and bump into a small table where a fish bowl falls and covers his head.
