= The Katnips of 1940 =

1934 short film

- Directed by: Ben Harrison
- Produced by: Charles Mintz
- Music by: Joe DeNat
- Animation by: Manny Gould; Allen Rose; Preston Blair
- Color process: Black and white
- Production company: Charles Mintz Studio
- Distributed by: Columbia Pictures
- Release date: October 12, 1934
- Running time: 7:31
- Language: English

The Katnips of 1940 is a 1934 short animated film distributed by Columbia Pictures, and stars Krazy Kat.

== Plot ==
Krazy is a dance instructor who is teaching moves to a quartet of cat dancing girls wearing leotards and high-heeled pumps. When the girls are having trouble following his instructions, Krazy puts ropes on their legs to show them how to move.

Momentarily, Kitty Kat—Krazy's usual girlfriend from the sound-era shorts, here drawn with Swedish-style blonde corkscrew curls—comes out of a dance school only a few yards away before entering Krazy's studio. Kitty comes to Krazy, and shows him her dance skills. Krazy, however, is not interested and therefore turns her down as he is expecting a famous soprano, Fifi La Frog, to arrive. Kitty then shows her singing skills by letting out a high tone that jolts Krazy off his feet, but Krazy still turns her down. Kitty then demonstrates her acting skills as she goes into a movable balcony, and recites some romantic poems "like Katharine Hepburn". To keep her away, Krazy raises and sets the balcony to the peak. Kitty screams in horror upon seeing no way down.

A fancy car arrives just outside the studio minutes later. Exiting the vehicle is the soprano whom Krazy was waiting for. La Frog comes to Krazy, and sings a few notes for demonstration. Kitty, who is still up on the movable balcony, applauds before accidentally leaning too forward and falling off the platform onto La Frog, who is deformed as a result, transforming into a realistic frog, with a croaking voice. La Frog leaves the scene embarrassed. Krazy has no choice but to pick Kitty for the show.

Later that night, the scene shows the outside of the theater with a banner of the event called "The Katnips of 1940". Fifi La Frog's name on the banner is also shown being replaced by that of Kitty Kat. The event is started by a group of singing can-can dancers. Then Kitty takes center stage. Kitty, in Latin American costume, is at first hesitant to step into the limelight but Krazy literally gives her a push. Kitty sings, dances, and plays castanets on the stage with complete fluency. Krazy joins her on stage in similar costume seconds afterward. The next act features Kitty as a fan dancer, and the third act features Krazy and Kitty together, dressed like Uncle Sam and the Statue of Liberty respectively as they sing the Depression-themed song "Oh, Boy, What a New Deal". With three flawless performances, both of them receive applause. After the lights move away from them and back, Krazy and Kitty are gifted with an enormous bouquet and kiss one another within it.

== See also ==
- Krazy Kat filmography
