= The Crystal Gazebo =

1932 film

- Directed by: Manny Gould; Ben Harrison
- Produced by: Charles Mintz
- Music by: Joe DeNat
- Animation by: Allen Rose; Preston Blair
- Color process: Black and white
- Production company: Charles Mintz Studio
- Distributed by: Columbia Pictures
- Release date: November 7, 1932
- Running time: 6:39
- Language: English

The Crystal Gazebo is a 1932 short animated film distributed by Columbia Pictures, and one of the numerous shorts featuring Krazy Kat.

== Plot ==
In a multi-domed palace somewhere in the Middle East, a jackal wearing a turban is looking at things monitored by his crystal ball. Besides being able to see, the jackal can also touch and take things shown by the ball. He spots Krazy riding on a camel with his girlfriend, a spaniel. The jackal kills the camel and kidnaps the spaniel.

Krazy finds a replacement camel inside the dead camel and rides it to the palace. With the entrance blocked by two hippopotamus guards, Krazy drills his way in. Inside, Krazy finds the jackal and the spaniel. The jackal flees through an elevator while holding the spaniel. Krazy tries to enter a door, but the door crushes him against the wall, and sends him through a hole, which becomes narrow, then wide, then swirly. He gets past a pack of mummies that try to pound him with a bat. Then the cat gets trapped inside a transparent clock with a giant knife moving within. Next a bee stings him and he turns fat and floats upward, bringing the clock with him. Two birds peck the back of the clock, opening it, and pinch Krazy, making him deflate to his regular size.

Krazy reaches a room where he again finds the jackal and the spaniel, while the Poet and Peasant overture begins to play. The jackal tosses an urn at Krazy, who responds by throwing punches at the jackal. The spaniel joins Krazy in striking her captor. Finally, the jackal is slammed against a wall where bottles fall from a shelf. The jackal slams a TNT bottle on the ground, and it explodes.

At this point, Krazy and the spanie wake up on a sofa from the nightmare they were having and hear a radio in the room telling the end of a story about a magician, and they begin to comfort each other with kisses.

== See also ==
- Krazy Kat filmography
