= Bowery Daze =

- Directed by: Harry Love
- Produced by: Charles Mintz
- Music by: Joe DeNat
- Animation by: Allen Rose; Preston Blair
- Color process: Black and white
- Production company: Charles Mintz Studio
- Distributed by: Columbia Pictures
- Release date: March 30, 1934
- Running time: 6:12
- Language: English

Bowery Daze is a 1934 short animated film distributed by Columbia Pictures. The film is one of the many animated adaptations featuring Krazy Kat who started out as a comic strip character.

== Plot ==
Krazy is a bartender of a tavern on the street of Bowery. He serves his patrons by filling their mugs with lager from barrels.

When the pianist of the place is done playing, Krazy conducts an orchestra to play some music. As the music plays, a stage act featuring dancing ladies takes place. The dancing ladies are fronted by none other than Krazy's spaniel girlfriend. Krazy's act is followed by one featuring a bass singer walrus singing a melancholy song.

Moments later, while Krazy and the spaniel are at a table chatting, a fat Onion Johnny comes in. The Onion Johnny takes the spaniel, and dances with her regardless of what she thinks. Krazy, who is a bit bothered, intervenes. When Krazy and the spaniel pummel at the Onion Johnny, the patrons hurl glassware around before going into a brawl. Eventually, the spaniel restrains the Onion Johnny in a corset.

== See also ==
- Krazy Kat filmography
