= The Medicine Show (film) =

- Directed by: Manny Gould; Ben Harrison
- Produced by: Charles Mintz
- Music by: Joe DeNat
- Animation by: Allen Rose; Preston Blair
- Color process: Black and white
- Production company: Charles Mintz Studio
- Distributed by: Columbia Pictures
- Release date: February 7, 1933
- Running time: 6:40
- Language: English

The Medicine Show is a 1933 short animated film by Columbia Pictures. The film is part of a long-running short film series featuring Krazy Kat.

== Plot ==
Krazy is a pharmacist who retails medicine in his horse-drawn wagon. When he stops by to sell his products, he first puts up a magic show. Bystanders gather around to watch. His first act shows him playing a clarinet while a python dances. His second act features a lady wolf being inside a wooden box which Krazy saws into four pieces, but instead of his assistant being divided, four small lady wolves pop out of each piece. When the parts of the wooden box are placed back together, the lady wolf comes out back in her one self.

After doing his acts, Krazy starts retailing his bottles of liquid medicine. One of his customers is an old beagle. The old beagle, after consuming a bottle, suddenly becomes very able and dances very fluently but also transforms into a small puppy who merrily leaves in a scooter.

Krazy's second customer is a pet dog with a flea problem. Krazy pours liquid from one of his bottles onto the pet dog. The fleas start to jump out and leave their host.

As more customers flock to Krazy's wagon, a rat can be seen drinking one of his bottles. The rat, for some reason, transforms into a vicious lion. The lion scares everybody, including Krazy, away from the scene.

The lion continues to chase Krazy for many yards. On the way, the lion comes across a pack of dachshunds. The dachshunds try to outrun the lion but the big cat swallows them. The dachshunds are able to exit the lion's mouth, but as they come out, the little dogs have been transformed into little lions. Despite their size, the little lions manage to scare away their swallower. The little lions then turn to and confront Krazy, but as they jump forth, Krazy traps the tiny beasts in a bottle.

== See also ==
- Krazy Kat filmography
