= Jazz Rhythm =

1930 film

- Directed by: Manny Gould; Ben Harrison
- Story by: Ben Harrison
- Produced by: Charles Mintz
- Starring: Krazy Kat
- Music by: Joe DeNat
- Animation by: Manny Gould; Allen Rose; Harry Love
- Color process: Black and white
- Production company: Charles Mintz Studio
- Distributed by: Columbia Pictures
- Release date: June 19, 1930
- Running time: 8:21
- Language: English

Jazz Rhythm is a 1930 short animated film distributed by Columbia Pictures. The film is part of a series featuring the comic strip character Krazy Kat.

== Plot ==
The short film

Sports aficionados from faraway come to a stadium to watch an event. Although the event features a boxing ring, the event is not a boxing match, but a contest between two pianists playing animated pianos. One of them is Krazy Kat who uses a grand piano. His opponent is a lion who uses an upright piano.

The lion is first to play. Despite getting some disturbance from a passing bee, the lion manages to perform without flaws.

Krazy is next to perform. Krazy also performs perfectly, thanks to not being disrupted.

After the pianists performed, they rest in their corners like boxers who been through a tough fight. Each of them has a corner man who is a rat, and tries to keep them cool.

Moments later the third round begins. This time it is a boxing match between the two pianos as the instruments trade punches. After some exchange, Krazy's piano comes out the winner. Krazy celebrates by playing his piano again. The lion and the other piano, despite being bested, join Krazy's play minutes later.

== See also ==
- Krazy Kat filmography
