= The Autograph Hunter =

- Directed by: Harry Love
- Produced by: Charles Mintz
- Music by: Joe DeNat
- Animation by: Preston Blair; Allen Rose
- Color process: Black and white
- Production company: Charles Mintz Studio
- Distributed by: Columbia Pictures
- Release date: January 5, 1934
- Running time: 6:14
- Language: English

The Autograph Hunter is a 1934 short animated film distributed by Columbia Pictures, featuring the comic strip character Krazy Kat as well as some caricatures of well-known actors of the time.

== Plot ==
A fancy domed restaurant is open in the city, and famous actors make up most of the patrons. This catches the attention of Krazy who aims to get their autographs. John Barrymore comes out of a luxuriant car, and walks toward the restaurant. Krazy comes and asks for his signature of which the man accepts to sign. Krazy wants to collect more autographs but the bouncer would not let him enter the place.

To get around the bouncer, Krazy enters the back door of the restaurant. He finds Laurel and Hardy working there as dishwashers. When Krazy asks for an autograph, Laurel is the one to sign.

Krazy then proceeds to the dining area. He meets Edward G. Robinson who signs by writing three x's with watermelon seeds. He next meets Mae West who writes "you can be had" on his book. He then meets the Marx Brothers who sign by playing tic-tac-toe. He then comes across Jimmy Durante who is not in the mood to sign, but Greta Garbo sharing Durante's table, and even mimicking the actor's catchphrase, is the one to write. Krazy goes on to receive signings from Joe E. Brown, and Eddie Cantor who writes ovals and a zigzagging line on his book. He comes to Wallace Beery who is having difficulty eating soup but the cat quickly changes his mind. He approaches Marie Dressler with an overweight man. The overweight couple plays tug-of-war with Krazy's book until it is Dressler who wins and gets to sign. The last person to autograph Krazy's book is Charlie Chaplin. As Chaplin stands up before leaving, however, numerous butter knives drop from that actor's garments. This attracts the bouncer who spots and starts chasing Krazy.

The bouncer chases Krazy across the restaurant. After bashing a lot of objects and a few bystanders one of which being Maurice Chevalier, the bouncer eventually catches Krazy. But to Krazy's amazement, the bouncer turns out to be a fan who just wants the cat's autograph.

== See also ==
- Krazy Kat filmography
