= The Broadway Malady =

1933 film

- Directed by: Manny Gould; Ben Harrison
- Story by: Manny Gould
- Produced by: Charles Mintz
- Music by: Joe DeNat
- Animation by: Allen Rose; Harry Love
- Color process: Black and white
- Production company: Charles Mintz Studio
- Distributed by: Columbia Pictures
- Release date: April 18, 1933
- Running time: 5:51
- Language: English

The Broadway Malady is a 1933 short animated film distributed by Columbia Pictures, and stars Krazy Kat. The title is derived from the 1929 feature film The Broadway Melody, but the cartoon makes no references to the feature film.

== Plot ==
At a subway station, Krazy tries to get a ride on a train, but before he could get aboard, numerous commuters come and quickly fill the carriages. By the time the commuters are in, Krazy is flat on his front. A station worker tries to help him by pushing those inside to make more space, but as Krazy attempts to come in, he is overtaken by more outside commuters. The jam-packed train leaves the station.

Another train stops by moments later. This time Krazy chews some garlic pieces and blows a cloud wall which keeps the incoming commuters at bay. With this, Krazy boards the train with ease, but as he takes a seat, the commuters quickly come in until Krazy gets pushed out the door. Thankfully the station worker is generous to slip him back in. Krazy finally gets to ride as that train departs.

Krazy's train is so full that its cars bulge almost to the point of bursting. Nevertheless, it remains in one piece. Although he manages to get a ride, Krazy has to avoid getting smushed by the passengers. When the train reaches its destination, the passengers come out flat, and a station employee has to inflate them with a pump. Krazy is in a worse situation as he is in pieces similar to a jigsaw puzzle. The station employee puts him back together on time.

== See also ==
- Krazy Kat filmography
