= Prosperity Blues =

1932 film

- Screenshot
- Directed by: Ben Harrison; Manny Gould
- Story by: Ben Harrison
- Produced by: Charles Mintz
- Music by: Joe DeNat
- Animation by: Al Eugster; Preston Blair
- Color process: Black and white
- Production company: Charles Mintz Studio
- Distributed by: Columbia Pictures
- Release date: October 8, 1932
- Running time: 5:51
- Language: English

Prosperity Blues is a 1932 short cartoon distributed by Columbia Pictures and a part of the Krazy Kat series.

== Plot ==
The film is set during the Great Depression. Krazy Kat is pulling a box filled with apples, and is trying to sell them, but most people around are low in cash and are too depressed to eat anything because of bad economic times. Moments later, he finds a customer in a spiffy horse. The spiffy horse pays Krazy a check with a considerable amount. Delighted by this, Krazy tries to deposit it in the bank. After getting into a tussle with individuals trying to snatch it, Krazy finds himself chasing his check as it is getting blown away.

After an airborne trip, the check finds its way back into the pockets of the spiffy horse. The spiffy horse then advises Krazy to be happy before putting a smiling mouth on the feline's frowning face. As a result, Krazy is happy and that he pretty much forgotten his problems. Krazy continues the spiffy horse's work in putting smiling mouths on others, thus inverting their moods. Over time, the public's depression is gone and somehow their financial problems also follow.

Krazy, the spiffy horse, and a hare go on to parade across the country, promoting their encouragement to be happy. Eventually, Krazy is seen walking up the steps of some capitol where he is greeted by Uncle Sam.

== Notes ==
- The songs Smile, Darn Ya, Smile! and Happy Days Are Here Again are used in the film.
- The short is available in the Columbia Cartoon Collection: Volume 3.

== See also ==
- Krazy Kat filmography
