= The Peace Conference =

- Directed by: Manny Gould; Ben Harrison
- Story by: Ben Harrison
- Produced by: Charles Mintz
- Music by: Joe DeNat
- Animation by: Manny Gould; Allen Rose; Harry Love
- Color process: Black and white
- Production company: Charles Mintz Studio
- Distributed by: Columbia Pictures
- Release date: April 26, 1935
- Running time: 6:29
- Language: English

The Peace Conference is a 1935 short animated film by Columbia Pictures, featuring the comic strip character Krazy Kat.

== Plot ==
Amidst conflict occurring in other nations, leaders from various parts of the world gather at a government building to discuss peace. At a dining table, the leaders' associates are receiving slices of ham. Because they could not agree about which kind of slice they should have, however, the associates brawl onto the table. Momentarily, an army tank barges into the building. Coming out of the tank is none other than Krazy Kat, who tells the rowdy associates that he can restore peace with his special rifle. The associates find his method ludicrous and therefore laugh. To prove them wrong, the cat fires his rifle at them, but unlike regular bullets, the projectiles conjure small-scale people which resemble celebrities at the time. The singing and dancing of these tiny men hypnotically induce pleasure in the associates, causing them to make up.

After curing the associates, Krazy heads to the room where the leaders are at a meeting. Peeping from behind a door, he notices the leaders are rather silent and in doubt on how to settle their problems. Krazy then fires his pleasure-inducing bullets which excites the heads-of-state into a jig as well giving them friendly perception of each other.

Up in space, the god of war Mars does not like what is happening on Earth. He then comes to the planet and into the government building. Mars attempts to preach everybody to return to their attacking ways. Krazy, who opposes the god's purpose, opts to take him on. As Mars moves menacingly toward the cat, Krazy fires two shots at him using the rifle. Both shots show some effect but the dangerous deity is able to snap out of it. As a last resort, Krazy fires multiple shots which brings down Mars for good. All the people in the vicinity celebrate Krazy's victory in singing and dancing, including Mars who has completely succumbed to the pleasure spell.

== Caricatures of notables ==
Celebrities caricatured in the film include Paul Whiteman, Bing Crosby, Ted Lewis, Rudy Vallée, etc. Mahatma Gandhi is also portrayed as one of the leaders in the meeting scene.

== See also ==
- Krazy Kat filmography
