= Southern Exposure (film) =

- Directed by: Manny Gould; Ben Harrison
- Produced by: Charles Mintz
- Music by: Joe DeNat
- Animation by: Manny Gould; Ben Harrison
- Color process: Black and white
- Production company: Charles Mintz Studio
- Distributed by: Columbia Pictures
- Release date: February 5, 1934
- Running time: 7:13
- Language: English

Southern Exposure is a 1934 short animated film distributed by Columbia Pictures. It is part of a long-running short film series starring Krazy Kat.

== Plot ==
Krazy and his spaniel girlfriend (who is wearing a blond wig in this short) are attending an outdoor party organized by a community of apes. The apes sing, dance, and play instruments. Krazy and the spaniel join in the activities, but the celebration of the apes gets interrupted when their master, a Labrador Retriever holding a whip, shows up. It is shown that the apes are forced laborers who work on sowing and harvesting crops for little rewards.

Krazy and the spaniel are also forced laborers whose job is to harvest cotton from the shrubs. Suddenly they accidentally shave the rear of a sheep, causing it to runaway. This irritates the master who starts chasing them.

Krazy and the spaniel try to escape by attempting to hide in a truck carrying ice blocks, but as the truck leaves, the ice blocks slip out along with them into a lake. They then continue their run on the floating ice blocks, although the master pursues them in the same way. Eventually, Krazy and the spaniel lose their pursuer as they reach the end of the ice block path. As they reach solid ground, they stumble and fall hard face first. While Krazy is able to get back on his feet, the spaniel is lifeless. Momentarily a pair of angels put wings on the spaniel and take her to the sky. Krazy, who could not afford to not have her around, decides to join the spaniel in the sky as he puts on a white robe and some fake wings. Krazy enters the sky's abode and notices the spaniel playing an organ, but before he could get to her, Krazy is nabbed by the sky's gatekeeper who is not fooled by his disguise. The gatekeeper tosses Krazy past the gates. As Krazy falls back towards the earth, a nearby angel tells him he can join them but he has to wait another time.

All that trouble was just a nightmare as Krazy is seen napping on a balcony seat at a theater. He then wakes up and is relieved of his grief to see the spaniel (in her usual appearance) right beside him, alive, and unscathed. Krazy and spaniel then kiss each other. The event of the theater features a quartet singing and dancing on stage. Some of the performers resemble the characters from Krazy's dream.

== See also ==
- Krazy Kat filmography
