= Svengarlic =

1931 film

- Directed by: Ben Harrison; Manny Gould
- Based on: Trilby by George du Maurier
- Produced by: Charles Mintz
- Music by: Joe DeNat
- Color process: Black and white
- Production company: Charles Mintz Studio
- Distributed by: Columbia Pictures
- Release date: August 3, 1931
- Running time: 8:04
- Language: English

Svengarlic is a 1931 short animated film distributed by Columbia Pictures, and one of the many cartoons featuring the comic strip character Krazy Kat. The film is a parody of the 1931 film Svengali which in turn is based on the 1894 novel Trilby.

== Plot ==
A crazed Labrador Retriever, who is a musician, plays some music on his piano (one of which would be repeated by Krazy in Seeing Stars). When his piano collapses due to being overplayed, the labrador gobbles some garlic pieces and delivers a breath onto the instrument. Surprisingly, the piano returns to its normal shape, and the canine musician can play again. When he is finished playing, he spots someone outside singing with a voice he finds pretty.

The one singing in the street is the spaniel girlfriend of Krazy Kat. She then comes to a hotel, looking to get a room. The hotel guests find her likable as they courteously hurl their keys at her feet. One of the guests is Krazy who instead lowers a rope from his window to pick her up.

Inside his room, Krazy could not help looking constantly at his sweetheart. He then asks the spaniel to stand on a platform where he tries to paint a portrait of her. Their meeting, however, gets interrupted when the labrador comes unexpectedly. The labrador, who is also skilled in hypnosis, uses his spell to lure the spaniel out of the building, much to Krazy's surprise.

The labrador then lures the spaniel into a theater and onto a stage. Under the labrador's conducting, the spaniel sings in the style of a soprano. Although the conductor receives a bit of harassment from Krazy, the act continues. When the spaniel has trouble making the high notes, the labrador uses his garlic breath once more to improve her performance. Before he could hear the final notes, the labrador is sprayed ether on by Krazy. Krazy then sneaks behind the curtains, and jerks the spaniel at the back, causing her to let out a high note which the spectators find impressive. Krazy and the spaniel celebrate the act with a kiss.
