= Sleepy Holler =

1929 film

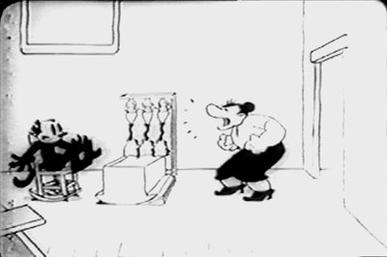
- Screenshot
- Directed by: Ben Harrison; Manny Gould
- Produced by: Charles Mintz
- Animation by: Ben Harrison; Manny Gould
- Color process: Black and white
- Production company: Winkler Pictures
- Distributed by: Paramount-Famous-Lasky
- Release date: July 19, 1929
- Running time: 6:37
- Language: English

Sleepy Holler is a 1929 silent animated short film by Winkler Pictures, and stars Krazy Kat. It is the last film in the series to be distributed by Paramount Pictures.

== Plot ==
Short surviving clip

Krazy Kat is a hired babysitter who looks after three kittens owned by a hefty nagging woman. His duties include rocking the offspring to sleep, making breakfast, and washing the chinaware. All of which he does simultaneously while in his chair. One day, he is so worn out that he takes a snooze in his seat.

In his dream, Krazy finds himself in a blank room. After looking around for a few moments, he is amazed to access a bed hidden in one of the walls. He then puts on a nightgown and gets in the bed, but before he could sleep, the three kittens, who are already grown and walking, enter the room. They were marching and playing drums. Bothered by the racket, Krazy tells them to play somewhere but the little cats refuse. Attempting to force them out, he hurled boots and other objects. Just then, the nagging woman came in, and the kittens are quick to blame the situation on him. Not wanting to experience any abuse, Krazy gets off the bed and walks out of the door.

Wandering outside, Krazy desperately looks for places where he could relax. Finding a rock under some trees, the feline lies down and puts his head on it, but disturbances like falling branches and rain keep him awake. When the showers end, Krazy goes to lie on a pile of sand, burying part of himself in the dirt, but it appears there is a bear under the pile which rises, rambles, and unknowingly carries him for a few paces. Surprised by this, Krazy jumps off and goes on walking.

Krazy then arrives in a city. There, he sees a shop displaying a bed in the window. As good news to him, he reads an ad hiring someone who would like to prove the bed's quality by dozing in it. Krazy goes inside the shop and takes the job. As he sleeps in the featured product, passers-by outside stop in front of the store and take notice.

Finally, Krazy wakes up from his dream and realizes he is still in the kittens' home. The kittens are still in the crib and too young to stand on their feet. The nagging woman then comes in and tells him to resume his work.

== See also ==
- Krazy Kat filmography
