= Kannibal Kapers =

- Directed by: Ben Harrison
- Produced by: Charles Mintz
- Music by: Joe DeNat
- Animation by: Manny Gould
- Color process: Black and white
- Production company: Charles Mintz Studio
- Distributed by: Columbia Pictures
- Release date: December 27, 1935
- Running time: 6:29
- Language: English

Kannibal Kapers is a 1935 short animated film by Columbia Pictures featuring the comic strip character Krazy Kat.

== Plot ==
Krazy is riding away at sea on a life ring, perhaps from a ship that sunk. His life ring suddenly catches a large fish that is behaving like a horse, which makes Krazy dizzy and, moments later, the fish promptly hurls him onto a tree on an island full of cannibals. Krazy ends up falling into a tree where a spider monkey was resting, the spider monkey catches Krazy from behind and, confused, he accidentally ends up pulling a leaf that was holding him and made him fall on a platter which is then carried away by a cannibal chef, who carries Krazy to the chief of the cannibal tribe. The cannibal chief, however, finds Krazy not having enough flesh, and therefore refuses to eat him. The wife of the chief comes by and develops affection for him.

To treat the cannibal couple for sparing his life, Krazy decides to entertain them by dancing and being the conductor of their orchestra. Krazy then conducts, and the orchestra is performing in a more upbeat fashion. The performance goes as planned until Krazy is approached by a cannibal woman who seems to be bothered by the music. When Krazy does not notice her, the woman kicks him. The kick sends Krazy airborne onto much of the orchestra who are most disturbed. The musicians gang on him but Krazy is able to escape, but while he runs, a double bass player grabs and shoots Krazy like an arrow projected by a bow. The cartoon ends with Krazy falling back into the sea.

== Reception ==
In 1936, two tabloids National Exhibitor and Motion Picture Review Digest gave generally negative reviews to the cartoon, primarily criticizing its story, with the former saying that the cartoon had no plot.

== See also ==
- Krazy Kat filmography
