= Railroad Rhythm =

- Directed by: Allen Rose
- Produced by: Charles Mintz
- Starring: Mel Blanc; Leone LeDoux; Danny Webb
- Music by: Joe DeNat
- Animation by: Harry Love
- Color process: Black and white
- Production company: Charles Mintz Studio
- Distributed by: Columbia Pictures
- Release date: November 20, 1937
- Running time: 5:50
- Language: English

Railroad Rhythm is a 1937 short animated film by Columbia Pictures starring the comic strip character Krazy Kat, and part of a long-running series of short films featuring the character.

== Plot ==
Krazy is a train engineer, driving an old steam train. While Krazy enjoys himself and even sings I've Been Working on the Railroad, the passengers are disoriented by the coaches tilting back and forth. When the train stops at a local station, the passengers exit, and express their dislike of the ride, before boarding a more modern train at the place.

As Krazy continues to run his train, a villainous mutt, some miles ahead, ties a man and a woman, who are a couple, onto the track. Krazy, however, notices the restrained couple on time. Krazy dives his train into the ground, going under them, before getting back to the surface. Krazy comes out of the train to untie the couple. The man gives Krazy a sack of cash as a sign of gratitude.

Krazy uses the money he received from the man to purchase one of the modern trains. The man and the woman are on board as passengers, but troubles are not over as the mutt returns in an airplane to drop bombs on the train. The couple, however, is not defenseless as the man uses a trumpet to summon an army tank to the scene. After firing several rounds, the airplane is eventually shot down.

== Reception ==
Motion Picture Exhibitor and Selected Motion Pictures gave positive reviews to the cartoon. The first review commended its animation, but criticized its gags as "little weak". The second review called the cartoon as "clever" and "amusing".

== See also ==
- Krazy Kat filmography
