= Krazy's Race of Time =

- Directed by: Allen Rose
- Produced by: Charles Mintz
- Starring: Billy Bletcher
- Narrated by: Billy Bletcher
- Music by: Joe DeNat
- Animation by: Harry Love
- Color process: Black and white
- Production company: Charles Mintz Studio
- Distributed by: Columbia Pictures
- Release date: May 6, 1937
- Running time: 6:56
- Language: English

Krazy's Race of Time is a 1937 short animated film distributed by Columbia Pictures and is part of a short film series featuring Krazy Kat.

== Plot ==
When traffic becomes a bigger and more dangerous problem, authorities seek for a solution. They solve this by elevating the roads, some of which pass through the tall buildings. They even resort to making every house and building float in the sky.

Sometime after the advancements mentioned above, Krazy, who works as a chemist, is working on a special liquid. Upon drinking the liquid from a beaker, Krazy rapidly zooms around like a rocket. Astronomers would use his idea to send him on an exploration trip to the planet Mars. The astronomers place the cat in a real rocket which they launch.

Krazy's rocket lands safely on the red planet. Krazy wonders around the Martian grounds where he notices the local humanoid creatures and their odd customs. At the end of his journey, Krazy comes across a scary giant whom he tries to befriend. The giant, however, mistakes Krazy for an invader and therefore attempts to capture the cat. Krazy can escape the giant's grasp by drinking a beaker of his special liquid. As Krazy flees the planet in his rocket, the giant starts hurling meteors at him. Krazy manages to fly away without getting hit.

== See also ==
- Krazy Kat filmography
