= Weenie Roast =

1931 film

- Screenshot
- Directed by: Ben Harrison; Manny Gould
- Story by: Ben Harrison
- Produced by: Charles Mintz
- Music by: Joe DeNat
- Animation by: Manny Gould
- Color process: Black and white
- Production company: Charles Mintz Studio
- Distributed by: Columbia Pictures
- Release date: September 14, 1931
- Running time: 6 min.
- Language: English

Weenie Roast is a 1931 short animated cartoon distributed by Columbia Pictures, starring Krazy Kat.

== Plot ==
Krazy Kat and his spaniel girlfriend are singing and dancing at the beach. As they do their rhythmic leisure, they also roast some sausages for lunch above a bonfire, but because the fire is too close to the shore, waves come by which put out the flames and wash away their food. To start over, Krazy picks up some driftwood in the vicinity and lights them. The cat and the dog resume what they are doing.

Following their trip to the beach, Krazy and the spaniel head to a carnival. The two then decide to start with the roller coaster which the spaniel is quick to take seat. While Krazy is still outside trying to pay for the ride, the coaster operator suddenly sneezes, therefore blowing the coaster away, much to the girl mutt's panic. Krazy scales up the elevated the tracks to rescue his sweetheart. After chasing the coaster for a number of yards, the cat is able to get on board but wonders how he could stop it. The coaster eventually comes off the tracks and onto the fairgrounds where it runs through some tents and a tunnel of mirrors. Upon reaching the tunnel's exit, the runaway railway vehicle finally drops into a shallow pond, thus spilling out its passengers. Landing on the ground, Krazy and the spaniel are dazed but also relieved that the nightmarish ride is over.

== Availability ==
- Columbia Cartoon Collection: Volume 2

== See also ==
- Krazy Kat filmography
