= Rail Rode =

1927 film

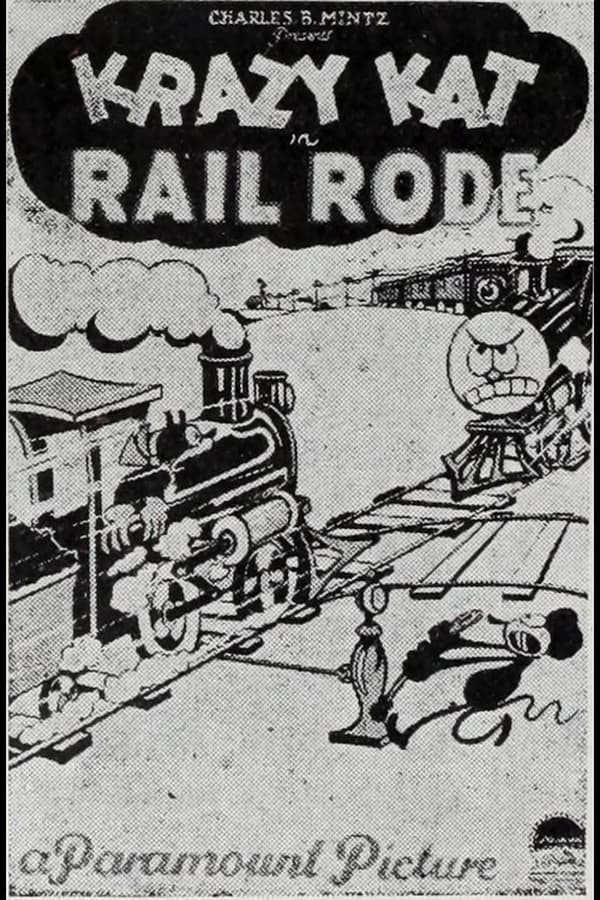
- Theatrical release poster
- Directed by: Ben Harrison; Manny Gould
- Animation by: Ben Harrison; Manny Gould
- Color process: B&W
- Production company: Winkler Pictures
- Distributed by: Paramount-Famous-Lasky
- Release date: September 24, 1927
- Running time: 3:34
- Country: United States
- Language: Silent

Rail Rode is a 1927 silent short animated film released by Paramount Pictures featuring Krazy Kat.

== Plot ==
The short film

Krazy Kat and his pal Ms. Kwakk Wakk are on vacation as they board a train at the station, but their pleasant ride is going to have some disruptions when their rival Ignatz (drawn here to resemble a tall and naked Mickey Mouse with mustache) also goes on board. Moments after the train departed, Krazy and Kwakk Wakk are confronted by Ignatz. The cat and the rodent engage in a brawl while the mallard stands aside, serving as Krazy's backup. Krazy eventually wins the fight and kicks Ignatz off the train. Though removed from the ride, Ignatz still looks to get back at them as the rodent tampers a track switch, sending the train into another track.

Krazy and Kwakk Wakk are still on the train, enjoying their tour. Although the train is running on a different track, they give it no thought, assuming they are on the right path, but things begin to look grim for them when they see another train coming right at theirs. Without enough time to come up with a good solution, Krazy turns his tail into a huge spring and heads to the front of their train. Miraculously, the crash is prevented as the trains are cushioned by the spring. The mayor and the crowd, who are present at the scene, are amazed by the deed as they applaud and give handshakes to Krazy.

== See also ==
- Krazy Kat filmography
