= Lil' Ainjil =

- Directed by: Ben Harrison
- Written by: Ben Harrison
- Produced by: Charles Mintz
- Starring: Danny Webb (uncredited)
- Music by: Joe DeNat
- Animation by: Manny Gould; Isidore Klein (uncredited)
- Color process: Black and white
- Production company: Charles Mintz Studio
- Distributed by: Columbia Pictures
- Release date: March 19, 1936
- Running time: 5:45
- Country: United States
- Language: English

Lil' Ainjil is a 1936 short animated film distributed by Columbia Pictures, and features Krazy Kat.

== Plot ==
Offissa Pupp and Mrs. Kwakk Wakk are walking down a road in Coconino County, musically discussing Pupp's role as the policeman and warder of the county and Ignatz Mouse's disregard for his authority. On the way, they find Krazy sticking their head inside a small theater box. On the other side of the box, Ignatz is tossing bricks at Krazy's head, but the Kat responds amorously. The suspicious Offissa Pupp goes around and eventually notices the reality before arresting Ignatz.

Offissa Pupp imprisons Ignatz and walks away in celebration. Despite Ignatz's malicious treatment, Krazy feels sorry and decides to break the rodent out of the slammer. The naïve cat offers Ignatz a pie that conceals carpentry tools. Ignatz uses the tools to demolish the prison to the ground. In doing so, another criminal is released.

That other criminal runs into the open and begins harassing the Mrs. Kwakk Wakk. Offissa Pupp struggles to intervene. For some reason, Ignatz decides to help out the Offissa Pupp by taking a machine gun and firing it at the criminal. The criminal is taken down, and Mrs. Kwakk Wakk is safe.

Though he escaped prison, Ignatz, nonetheless, receives a handshake from the Offissa Pupp for the assistance. As they go their separate ways, Ignatz sees Krazy joyously dancing around. He finds a square rock and throws it at Krazy, knocking the cat unconscious. Offissa Pupp, who is not too faraway, saw the deed, and chases Ignatz into the horizon.

== Overview ==
Unlike the Krazy Kat films of the Winkler and Columbia period, animator Isidore Klein attempted to create Lil' Ainjil in the milieu of George Herriman's comic strips, but the film was not well received by critics, prompting the series to revert to their current setting.

== Notes ==
- The name of the short would become the catchphrase that Krazy says in the 1960s TV series after every time the feline gets hit by a brick thrown by Ignatz Mouse.
- The short is available in the Columbia Cartoon Collection: Volume 8.

== See also ==
- Krazy Kat filmography

== Bibliography ==
- Maltin, Leonard (1987). Of Mice and Magic: A History of American Animated Cartoons. Penguin Books. ISBN 0-452-25993-2.
- Columbia Cartoons - The Columbia Shorts Department
