= The Apache Kid (1930 film) =

1930 film

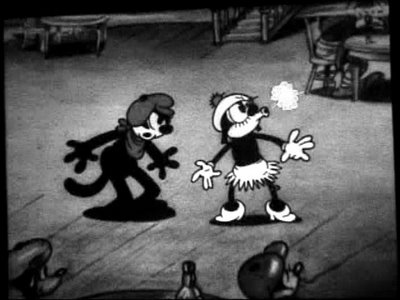
- Krazy and the spaniel
- Directed by: Ben Harrison; Manny Gould
- Produced by: Charles Mintz
- Music by: Joe DeNat
- Animation by: Ben Harrison; Manny Gould
- Color process: Black and white
- Production company: Winkler Pictures
- Distributed by: Columbia Pictures
- Release date: October 9, 1930
- Running time: 6:37
- Language: English

The Apache Kid is a 1930 cartoon short distributed by Columbia Pictures and features Krazy Kat. The film is the character's 158th film.

== Plot ==
The short film

In a tavern, Krazy is playing the piano while his spaniel girlfriend is sitting on it and singing. After spending a few moments by that instrument, they stand up and do the Apache dance. Suddenly, a tiger comes by and grabs the spaniel, taking her far away. Though the kidnapper flees in a horse, Krazy still chooses to run after on foot.

Krazy follows the tiger's trail into a sewer. Krazy almost manages to catch the spaniel while on top of the tiger without him noticing. He asks the spaniel to stop screaming so he can catch her silently without the tiger noticing but the tiger notices Krazy and he throws him into the sewer water and goes with the spaniel to a secret lair. Unbeknownst for Krazy, the tiger leaves the place where he is with the spaniel without entry. Desperately wanting to be released and see her boyfriend again, the spaniel weeps on the couch. In this, the tiger decides to cheer her up with a song and dance. While the captor is trying to entertain, Krazy finds an opening to the secret lair and goes in. Krazy finally confronts the tiger, and the two guys decide to settle things in a knife battle. Following several exchanges, the tiger is knocked cold. Krazy and the spaniel are reunited.

== Spaniel girlfriend ==
Krazy's spaniel girlfriend makes one of her earliest appearances in this short, therefore becoming one of the primary cast not originating from the comic strip. She would then replace Ignatz Mouse as Krazy's supporting character, and even appearing in the title cards from 1930 to 1933.

== Availability ==
- Columbia Cartoon Collection: Volume 1

== See also ==
- Krazy Kat filmography
