= Preston Blair (disambiguation) =

Preston Blair (1908–1995) was an American character animator.

Preston Blair may also refer to:

- Francis Preston Blair (1791–1876), American journalist, newspaper editor, and influential political figure
- Francis Preston Blair Jr. (1821–1875), United States politician and Union Army general during the American Civil War
