= Soda Poppa =

1931 short film by Columbia Pictures

- Story by: Ben Harrison
- Produced by: Charles Mintz
- Music by: Joe DeNat
- Animation by: Manny Gould
- Color process: Black and white
- Production company: Charles Mintz Studio
- Distributed by: Columbia Pictures
- Release date: May 29, 1931
- Running time: 7:09
- Language: English

Soda Poppa is a 1931 animated short film by Columbia Pictures. It is one of many short films starring Krazy Kat.

== Plot ==
Krazy runs a soda shop where patrons come for drinks. One day, his spaniel girlfriend and two other guys come by. They, along with Krazy, then sing the song Ice Cream (I Scream, You Scream, We All Scream for Ice Cream). Krazy serves each of them a mug of his beverages. After they drink, the two guys leave but the spaniel remains in the shop to spend time with her boyfriend. Krazy takes her to another room within the shop and turns on a player piano. He then sings a song in the melody of his theme music and dances with the spaniel.

Moments later, a Labrador Retriever in a luxuriant car stops by the shop. The labrador courts the spaniel to have a ride with him. The spaniel appears enticed as she takes seat in the vehicle. The car leaves, and Krazy is in disbelief.

The labrador takes the spaniel to a hotel. In the room they entered, the spaniel seems to lose interest with her new date as she tries to avoid him. At one moment she pretends to agree with him, and the labrador hesitates with affection. The spaniel uses this to tiptoe towards a telephone, and call Krazy. Krazy receives the call and quickly comes to the scene. The cat breaks into the hotel room, and engages the labrador in a fistfight. After trading several hits, Krazy emerges the victor. Throughout the entire fight, the spaniel is weeping, thinking her boyfriend is badly beaten. Krazy comforts her by placing the knocked out labrador on her like a scarf. Krazy and the spaniel are together and happy again.

== See also ==
- Krazy Kat filmography
