= Taken for a Ride (1931 film) =

1931 film

- Screenshot
- Directed by: Manny Gould; Ben Harrison
- Story by: Allen Rose
- Produced by: Charles Mintz
- Music by: Joe DeNat
- Animation by: Harry Love
- Color process: Black and white
- Production company: Charles Mintz Studio
- Distributed by: Columbia Pictures
- Release date: January 3, 1931
- Running time: 5:29
- Language: English

Taken for a Ride is a 1931 short animated film by Columbia Pictures, and one of many starring Krazy Kat. Existing prints of the cartoon are likely to have missing footage and some distorted sequences.

== Plot ==
One night, a trio of criminal gorillas go on a rampage in a city using a machine gun. They loot some shops. As they flee in their van, they are followed by Krazy who is on a bike. They try to stop the cat from pursuing them by firing their machine gun, but Krazy is able to keep the bullets at bay.

The gorillas manage to lose Krazy somehow before they reach their hideout which is secretly under a cemetery. Strangely, one of the inhabitants in the hideout is a canine girl who strongly resembles Krazy's spaniel girlfriend. The leader gorilla treats her by offering a diamond necklace which the canine girl dons and embraces.

Krazy arrives at the cemetery minutes later but has lost track of the gorillas. After evading things like moving tombstones, Krazy encounters a living skeleton who shows him a passageway to the hideout for some reason.

Krazy walks inside the hideout to where the leader gorilla and the canine girl are at a table. While the canine girl gives Krazy a warm greeting, the leader gorilla is not happy to see him. Krazy confronts the simian boss with a pistol but the latter answers by showing multiple guns. The other two gorillas come and take the cat away.

The two gorillas take Krazy with them in the van. After traveling a few miles, they stop. When they step out, one of the gorillas draws an x on the ground, and tells Krazy to stand on it where they will shoot him, but before a bullet could be fired, Krazy shows them a photograph of his grandmother who cherishes him and would miss him if he perishes now. The gorillas tearfully feel sorry and decide not to kill him.

== See also ==
- Krazy Kat filmography
