= Love's Labour's Lost (disambiguation) =

Love's Labour's Lost is one of William Shakespeare's early comedies.

Love's Labour's Lost or Love's Labor Lost may also refer to:

- Love's Labour's Lost (opera), a 1973 opera by Nicolas Nabokov
- Love's Labour's Lost (film), a 2000 film by Kenneth Branagh
- Love's Labor Lost (film), a 1920 Krazy Kat cartoon
- "Love's Labor Lost" (ER), an episode of ER
- Love's Labour's Lost, a 1984 installment by Elijah Moshinsky of BBC Television Shakespeare

== See also ==
- "Love's Labours Lost in Space", an episode of Futurama
- Love's Labour's Won, a lost play attributed by contemporaries to William Shakespeare
