= Taken for a Ride (disambiguation) =

Taken for a Ride is a 1996 documentary film.

Taken for a Ride may also refer to:

- Taken for a Ride (1931 film), a short film
- "Taken for a Ride" (song), by Tally Hall, from the 2005 album Marvin's Marvelous Mechanical Museum
- "Taken for a Ride" (Slinger's Day), a 1987 television episode
