= The Lyin' Hunter =

- Directed by: Allen Rose
- Produced by: Charles Mintz
- Music by: Joe DeNat
- Animation by: Harry Love
- Color process: Black and white
- Production company: Charles Mintz Studio
- Distributed by: Columbia Pictures
- Release date: February 12, 1937
- Running time: 5:26
- Language: English

The Lyin' Hunter is a 1937 short animated film distributed by Columbia Pictures, and part of the Krazy Kat short film series.

== Plot ==
Krazy and two kittens are having a tour at a zoo. They look at a giraffe, and then a lion before they have a picnic. While the kittens are eating sandwiches, Krazy tells them a story about how courageous he was in the wilderness.

The scene goes into Krazy's story where he defeats a lion and a snake and proceeds to lead some animals in the wilderness. On the way, they are met by a vicious gorilla. While Krazy tries to confront the ape, it walks past him and chases the other animals. Eventually, Krazy takes some stripes from a zebra, and he uses them to snare the gorilla. Krazy stands victoriously over his subdued foe as his tale ends.

As the scene reverts to where Krazy and the kittens are still having a picnic, a tiger is on the loose. Krazy, at first, appears like he is going to face the tiger but decides to run seconds later. As he runs from the big cat, Krazy rides on a camel, then hops into the pouch of a kangaroo before going again on foot. While the chase scene is going on, the song Tiger Rag is played in the soundtrack. It turns out the chase is actually part of a movie scene as some studio men are shown filming it with their cameras. Upon completing their shot of the chase, the studio men laugh. It also turns out the tiger is just an actor in a tiger suit who then laughs. The kittens approach Krazy and give him a disdainful look as Krazy does not appear as courageous as he was in his story.

== See also ==
- Krazy Kat filmography
