= The Lone Mountie =

- Directed by: Allen Rose
- Produced by: Charles Mintz
- Starring: Mel Blanc; Leone LeDoux
- Music by: Joe DeNat
- Animation by: Harry Love
- Color process: Black and white
- Production company: Charles Mintz Studio
- Distributed by: Columbia Pictures
- Release date: December 10, 1938
- Running time: 6:57
- Language: English

The Lone Mountie is a 1938 short animated film by Columbia Pictures, and part of the long-running Krazy Kat film series.

== Plot ==
Krazy works as a waiter in a tavern in Canada. His tasks include serving drinks to the patrons, and on some occasions sing on stage with other waiters. One day, he falls in love with a female otter who sings on stage, but notices that the otter would only date a mountie. Krazy, carrying a platter with beverage in mugs, then daydreams of being a mountie and dating her. While he daydreams, the drinks on his platter fall off and spill on the floor. This irritates the manager who fires him out of the business.

After being removed from his job, Krazy finds a mountie station which he enters. Inside, he asks the mounties about joining them. The mounties at first laugh, thinking Krazy is unsuited because of his short stature. When Krazy still insists, they then decide to examine him. Over several minutes, Krazy passes every test.

Krazy, now a mountie, returns to the tavern. He then sticks a wanted poster on one of the tavern's walls. The poster catches the attention of the patrons. Momentarily the outlaw shown in the poster arrives and storms the place. Almost everybody at the scene flees in terror. Krazy is a bit afraid but the otter urges him to take on the outlaw as it is his duty. The outlaw finds and tries to take a chest but Krazy intervenes, resulting in those two trading punches. The otter tries to help Krazy by dropping a filled plant pot, only to hit Krazy, knocking him out cold by mistake. The outlaw is no longer interested in the chest, and therefore decides to capture the otter. Krazy, however, quickly regains consciousness and pursues the outlaw. After Krazy and the outlaw trade attack once more upstairs, the outlaw gets knocked off balance and tumbles downstairs and also gets wrapped in the stair carpet. Krazy fires his gun at the outlaw. The outlaw, who is still wrapped in the carpet, runs to hide inside a piano. The rolled carpet with holes created by Krazy's gunshots works like a piano roll as the piano starts to play a tune. Krazy and the otter sit next to the piano to enjoy the music.

== See also ==
- Krazy Kat filmography
