= Alaskan Knights =

1930 film

- Directed by: Manny Gould; Ben Harrison
- Produced by: Charles Mintz
- Animation by: Manny Gould; Ben Harrison
- Color process: Black and white
- Production company: Charles Mintz Studio
- Distributed by: Columbia Pictures
- Release date: May 23, 1930
- Running time: 6:57
- Language: English

Alaskan Knights, also known as Animal Rhythm in some reissues, is an animated cartoon by Columbia Pictures and part of the Krazy Kat series.

== Plot ==
The short film

Traveling through the frosty landscape, Krazy rides on a sled pulled by a pack of huskies. At the end of his journey, he enters a saloon where he spends the rest of the film. The saloon is filled with dancing guests but Krazy stands by the counter.

Moments later, a beautiful female rat in a skirt and pumps shows up on the balcony before walking downstairs. She then approaches and selects Krazy to be her dance partner. They begin to strut their stuff.

After Krazy and the rat sat by a table where they each drank a mug of ale, and play a tune of "Oh! Susanna", the cat decides to have fun on his own. He then picks up a bow and comes to a table occupied by a sleeping hefty patron. Getting carried away, Krazy pulls one of the hefty patron's mustaches and rubs the bow on them as if they were violin strings. In no time, that patron wakes up annoyed and gives Krazy an intimidating gaze, but before an attack could be delivered, Krazy takes his mustache and pricks his would-be-attacker who then explodes. In this, a group of smaller and harmless versions of the patron appeared and started dancing merrily. Krazy and the rat went on to join the celebration.

== Reception ==
A reviewer remarked: "Krazy Kat in his best form ... in the Alaskan locale, among snow, dogsleds and saloons full of grizzly miners".

== Miscellaneus ==
- Though Krazy's date in the short is a rat, her clothes suggests she is a prototype for the spaniel who would appear later in the same year.
- The short is available in the Columbia Cartoon Collection: Volume 1.

== See also ==
- Krazy Kat filmography
