= The Bandmaster (1930 film) =

1930 film

- Directed by: Manny Gould; Ben Harrison
- Story by: Ben Harrison
- Produced by: Charles Mintz
- Animation by: Manny Gould
- Color process: Black and white
- Production company: Charles Mintz Studio
- Distributed by: Columbia Pictures
- Release date: September 8, 1930
- Running time: 7:35
- Language: English

The Bandmaster is a 1930 short animated film distributed by Columbia Pictures, and one of the long-running cartoons featuring Krazy Kat. In a reissue print by Samba Pictures, the film is simply presented as Bandmaster.

== Plot ==
The short film

At a domed platform at a park, a group of musicians are gathered together, with Krazy as their conductor. Krazy puts on a Guy Fawkes mask before playing "The Stars and Stripes Forever". Halfway through the music, a trumpeter is having some problems playing, but instead of reprimanding the trumpeter, Krazy courteously encourages him to perform better. The melody resumes better this time, and upon completion, Krazy proudly takes off his mask.

Krazy and his orchestra then perform Twelfth Street Rag. Moments after starting, he mysteriously transforms into Paul Whiteman, then Charlie Chaplin, then Ted Lewis playing a clarinet, and finally Ben Turpin playing a trombone. After the scene shifts to some surroundings, Krazy is shown acting as himself again. Everyone dances to the song, including a statue of a cavalry man on a horse which both become animated.

== Reception ==
MPN gave a positive review to the cartoon, calling it "clever", among other Krazy Kat cartoons in their review.

== See also ==
- Krazy Kat filmography
