= Slow Beau =

1930 film

- Screenshot
- Directed by: Ben Harrison; Manny Gould
- Produced by: Charles Mintz
- Music by: Joe DeNat
- Color process: Black and white
- Production company: Charles Mintz Studio
- Distributed by: Columbia Pictures
- Release date: February 27, 1930
- Running time: 7:49
- Language: English

Slow Beau is a 1930 short animated film distributed by Columbia Pictures, starring Krazy Kat. The film also marks the debut of Krazy's second theme song which would have a much longer run than his first.

== Plot ==
The short film

At a harbor, a paddle steamer carrying popular stage performers arrives. One of the performers is a girl cockapoo whom Krazy suddenly falls in love with. Krazy goes on to serenade her with a banjo. Momentarily a hippo, who is also in love with her, also comes by.

A show opens at a theater, and starts with an orchestra playing "Alexander's Ragtime Band". The second act features a pack of hens doing can-can, and twirling muskets.

Most of the spectators watch from the stands. Krazy, for some reason, watches from a balcony that is meant for special guests. The hippo too watches from a balcony which is on the other side of the stands.

The third and final act features the girl cockapoo. She sings a non-verbal song but her gestures suggest she desperately wants someone to love her. From their balconies, Krazy and the hippo express their submission in body language. When the song ends, it appears the girl cockapoo belongs to the conductor of the first act orchestra, a boy hedgehog, who escorts her out of the stage, much to the surprise of Krazy and the hippo that did they drop onto the stage. They are even further surprised when the audience gazes at them before laughing.

The hippo tries to entertain the crowd by doing a little ballet. Krazy does not want him to have the spotlight as the cat plucks the buttons from the hippo's trousers. The trousers come down, and the hippo leaves embarrassed. Krazy takes over the limelight in doing some tap dancing. The hippo decides to get back at Krazy by hurling a banana peel onto the stage. When Krazy puts his feet on the banana peel, it cuts in half and the pieces are left on his feet, which makes Krazy look like he is on roller skates. Krazy manages to stay of foot for several seconds but still ends up seated after finally having slipped. Krazy, after slamming his ass five times on the floor, and being dizzy, ends his show and he gets pelted with objects from the spectators.

== See also ==
- Krazy Kat filmography
