= A Barnyard Frolic =

1925 film

- Directed by: Bill Nolan
- Story by: George Winkler
- Color process: Black and white
- Production company: Winkler Pictures
- Distributed by: Paramount Pictures
- Release date: 1926
- Running time: 5:03
- Language: English

A Barnyard Frolic is a 1926 animated cartoon short by the Winkler Pictures, and part of a long-running series featuring the comic strip character Krazy Kat. It was written by George Winkler and directed by Bill Nolan.

== Plot ==
The short film

Inside a house, Krazy is eating some doughnuts. As he opens an oven and takes out a roast turkey, a slightly irritated farmer confronts him. Though Krazy puts back the dish in the oven, the farmer roughs him up and hurls him outside. The farmer then calls out a rooster to put the cat to work.

At the open, Krazy runs on a treadmill which spins a circular saw, and the rooster uses it to cut some logs in half. After cutting the wood, the hostile rooster "piles" the logs at a wall of the house in a way of trying hit Krazy with them. Krazy, however, is able to dodge everything being hurled at him. When the rooster viciously approaches, Krazy runs, and the fowl chases. Upon running, Krazy squeezes himself into a small hole in a fence which the cat is able to pass through. The rooster attempts the same act, only to be stuck midway.

Following his work with the rooster, Krazy, for some reason, milks a cow. He then befriends a duckling, and pours the milk into a hole in the ground which the duckling swims in.

After spending time with the duckling, Krazy heads to another location where he takes a sock and plays it like an accordion. A pair of hens come and dance with him. They like his performance a lot that they collapse in amusement.

The farmer then comes into the open and is surprised to see the rooster who is still stuck in the fence. Further annoyed, the farmer chases Krazy beyond the farm and even tosses rocks.

Krazy runs from the farmer until he reaches a cliff. Without any other place to go, Krazy jumps off and dives into the sea below. The farmer jumps in too. Underwater, Krazy takes a rock to disguise himself as a turtle. When his pursuer drops by, Krazy attacks. Krazy manages to scare the farmer away and goes on to snatch the latter's trousers. He then constructs a boat, and uses the trousers as a sail. Krazy rides his boat and sails himself to freedom.

== See also ==
- Krazy Kat filmography
