= Krazy Kat and Ignatz Mouse: A Duet, He Made Me Love Him =

- Directed by: George Herriman
- Produced by: William Randolph Hearst
- Animation by: Frank Moser; Leon Searl
- Color process: Black and white
- Production company: International Film Service
- Distributed by: Hearst-Vitagraph News Pictorial
- Release date: March 3, 1916
- Running time: 3:19
- Language: English

Krazy Kat and Ignatz Mouse: A Duet, He Made Me Love Him, also simply known as A Duet, is a 1916 silent short animated film featuring Krazy Kat. It is among the earliest cartoons to feature Krazy who earlier achieved modest success through comic strips.

== Plot ==
The short film

Krazy is at his house reading a magazine. Ignatz comes in and goes inside a jar of jam. Krazy is aware of this and tries to get the rodent out of the jar. After getting bitten in the paws, he decides to discard the container, along with Ignatz, outdoors, but as he exits the house, Ignatz makes it out of the jar without him realizing it. When the cat is gone, the rodent plays the piano for a few moments before going inside the instrument.

After tossing the jar into a lake outside, Krazy returns home but starts to feel guilty for eliminating the rodent. To get over it, he starts to play the piano, and Ignatz, who is dangling on the strings inside, gets pounded by the hammers. Momentarily, a magpie comes to the house for a brief visit. Krazy then stops and stands to greet the bird. When the magpie leaves and Krazy is still standing, Ignatz, who had enough trouble inside the piano, comes out and strikes the cat with a billy club. Krazy is surprised but unsure of what he just felt.

== See also ==
- Krazy Kat filmography
