= The Wireless Wire-Walkers =

1921 film

- Screenshot
- Directed by: Vernon Stallings
- Produced by: John Randolph Bray
- Color process: Black and white
- Production company: Bray Studios
- Distributed by: Goldwyn Pictures
- Release date: February 26, 1921
- Running time: Approx. 3 minutes
- Country: USA
- Language: English

The Wireless Wire-Walkers, also released as Wireless Wire Walker, is a 1921 silent animated film starring Krazy Kat. The film marks the final Krazy Kat film produced by Bray Studios before the filmmakers moved to Winkler Pictures.

== Plot ==
The short film

Krazy Kat opens a pair of umbrellas for his upcoming wireless wire-walking show. Momentarily, his buddy, Ignatz Mouse, shows up holding some balloons. Krazy takes the balloons and places them under the umbrellas. Now they are ready for their big show. A crowd of animals run into the show-ground as Krazy and Ignatz advertise the act.

The crowd cheer as Krazy and Ignatz enter the scene. After Ignatz removes a pair of underwear they start their act. Their act involves a wire attached to two poles. Ignatz is first to go on the wire, and later invites Krazy on the wire. After their first act the crowd cheers once more.

Before setting up the next act, Krazy says "Ladies and Gentlemen! We will now present our famous wireless wire-walking act" and removes the wire. The two performers then bring their umbrellas with balloons secretly hidden underneath. Ignatz is again first to perform and manages to walk around as if there is a wire on the poles, faithfully fooling the audience. Before Krazy could perform, the balloons under both umbrellas burst. This infuriates the audience as they have realized they have been tricked, and they start chasing them. The chase continues until everyone runs off an edge and falls into a canyon.

== See also ==
- Krazy Kat filmography
