= Bokays and Brickbatz =

1925 film

- Directed by: Bill Nolan
- Color process: Black and white
- Production company: Winkler Pictures
- Distributed by: Paramount Pictures
- Release date: November 15, 1925
- Running time: 5:16
- Language: English

Bokays and Brickbatz is a lost 1925 silent short animated film featuring Krazy Kat. It is among the few films of the character to be directed by Bill Nolan who earlier worked on Felix the Cat films. The title is a play on the phrase "bouquets and brickbats" which is used as a section in some newspapers.

== Plot ==
Krazy wants to take a shower, but he is being disturbed by a pesky rat. When Krazy chases the rat to the outside of the house, the rodent manages to tie a string around his tail. The rat hangs Krazy on a tree branch by his tail. After Krazy cries so much, the rat shows mock sympathy by cutting the string, causing the cat to drop. Krazy retaliates as he pounds and throws the rat onto a wall. The rat speaks and vows retribution.

The rat enters a hole in the wall he was thrown on. Inside, there is a pack of other rats whom he negotiates with. Soon, other rats agree as they march out of the hole and towards Krazy's house.

Krazy is still in the bathroom of his house, trying to work on the piping system. The rats gather outside the house, armed with pistols. When one of the rats lands a shot, Krazy, who is also armed with pistols, leaps out a window and goes into a chase.

After gunning down a few during the run, Krazy chases the rats to a mountain. The rats, who are on top, begin rolling down boulders. Krazy, however, is able to dodge the rocks, and even manages to throw one back. Krazy then finds a skunk around which he momentarily hurls towards the rats. The rats are quite afraid of the skunk as they jump into a lake.

Krazy is back at home, resuming to shower. As he turns on a valve, regular water come out at first, but a few a seconds later, rats also rain down, much to his surprise.

== See also ==
- Krazy Kat filmography
