= The Stork Exchange =

1927 film

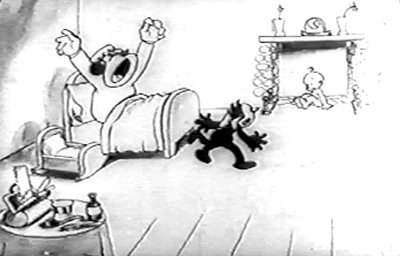
- Screenshot
- Directed by: Ben Harrison; Manny Gould
- Produced by: Charles Mintz
- Animation by: David Tendlar
- Color process: Black and white
- Production company: Winkler Pictures
- Distributed by: Paramount-Famous-Lasky
- Release date: December 17, 1927
- Running time: 7:21
- Country: United States
- Language: English

The Stork Exchange is a 1927 silent animated short film starring Krazy Kat. This film was thought to be lost but has been found. It is also one of the earliest in the cartoon series to feature Manny Gould and Ben Harrison's version of Krazy, the first of few incarnations derived from George Herriman's famous character.

== Plot ==
The short film

Krazy is driving his car on an urban road. As he goes on his journey, he spots a bird above, suspending something under its beak. The curious Krazy turns his vehicle into an aircraft, and takes off to investigate. Coming close in his flying car, he is amazed that the bird he spotted is a stork carrying an infant. He then sees the stork handing the child to a person on a rooftop before leaving. Although the bird leaves with an empty beak, Krazy continues to follow it.

The feline follows the stork into an adoption center up on the clouds. Inside, he is intrigued to see orphaned infants groomed and taken out of the place by other storks for delivery. Lunch time comes just then and one of the birds calls Krazy to watch over the infants. The infants are loud and bothersome but Krazy is able to keep them company. Suddenly, he receives a customer's order by phone. The cat then selects the suitable child for the delivery and takes off.

Up in mid-air for a few moments, Krazy is carrying the infant smoothly, but things become quite difficult for him as the tyke starts playing mischievously. Nevertheless, they reach the customer's house on time. When the infant's diaper comes off, the feline tries to put it back. The infant, however, refuses to wear it, and Krazy tries to do things in a scuffle, only to put the diaper on himself. The child then disappears mysteriously, and Krazy looks into the chimney. While he does, the infant shows up from the edge of the roof, and pushes him into the flue.

Krazy falls through the chimney and into the house with a waiting couple inside. Because of the diaper he is wearing, the couple mistakes him as the infant they ordered. The overjoyed wife then picks up, hugs, and smooches Krazy, much to the feline's dismay. After getting too much of the unwanted affection, Krazy removes his diaper and convinces the couple that there is a misunderstanding. Immediately, the infant he tried to deliver finally comes down the chimney and has been diapered somehow. The couple is pleased, knowing they got the correct order.

== Rediscovery ==
In 1948, cartoon producer Margaret J. Winkler had all the 1925–1929 Krazy Kat films kept in a storage facility. Because the films were made of a dangerous material called nitrocellulose, Winkler figured she had to get rid of them. Although a neighbor of hers showed interest in buying the films, she was still reluctant, and therefore gave the reels their final fate.

Nevertheless, a copy of The Stork Exchange and three other Krazy shorts were rediscovered in 2004 at an archive of the British Film Institute.

== Remake ==
Years after the Krazy Kat staff had the cartoons distributed by Columbia Pictures, a remake of The Stork Exchange was released in 1931 under the title The Stork Market. The storyline of this later film is very similar to its earlier counterpart except that Krazy's spaniel girlfriend makes an appearance there.

== See also ==
- Krazy Kat filmography
