= Stomach Trouble =

1927 film

- Directed by: Bill Nolan
- Produced by: George Winkler
- Color process: Black and white
- Production company: Screen Gems
- Distributed by: R-C Pictures Corporation (North America); First National Pictures (international)
- Release date: March 14, 1927
- Running time: 9:25
- Language: English

Stomach Trouble is a 1927 silent animated short film starring the comic strip character Krazy Kat. The short was released by Winkler Pictures.

== Plot ==
The short film

The cartoon starts in a house and Krazy wakes up from his bed. He then heads to the refrigerator to get some breakfast. To his surprise, he finds his refrigerator empty, and notices he desperately needs to fill his belly.

Krazy goes outside to look for anything to satisfy his hunger. He spots a pie placed on a window sill of another house but the owner removes it before Krazy could get near. He tries to take sausages from a basket carried by a hound but the long meats are too tricky to handle. He then attempts to take a sandwich from a steamer owned by a mime but the mime notices this immediately before taking back the cookware and fleeing.

While still looking for ways to obtain food, Krazy sees a chef carrying a platter with a roasted turkey on top, heading towards a prison. As he follows the chef, the cat sips the sauce that drips from the plate. Looking through a prison window, Krazy sees the turkey being served to a prisoner, giving him the notion that he too should be a prisoner. Krazy goes on to annoy the prison guard, even breaking the officer's billy club, until he is finally thrown into a cell. Inside his cell, Krazy is excited that he prepares some utensils. To his dismay, the guard only offers him tea. Krazy complains to the guard, who discloses that the other prisoner will be executed tomorrow, and therefore deserves some special treatment. Krazy faints in embarrassment.

== See also ==
- Krazy Kat filmography
