= Dentist Love =

1925 film

- Screenshot
- Directed by: Bill Nolan
- Produced by: Margaret J. Winkler
- Color process: Black and white
- Production company: Winkler Pictures
- Release date: 1926
- Running time: 2:20
- Country: United States
- Language: English

Dentist Love, also known as Hippo at the Dentist, is a silent short animated film by Winkler Pictures, and among the many starring the comic strip character Krazy Kat.

== Plot ==
The short film

The cartoon starts with Krazy and a spider monkey playing banjos on opposite sides of a hilltop house, but because they are playing different tunes, they find each other's play disrupting. The two meet each other face to face, resulting in Krazy smashing his banjo on the monkey's head, leaving the simian completely unconscious. Krazy then takes some of the monkey's candy before wandering the outdoors.

As Krazy wanders further, he encounters a hippo having a toothache, and a rat who tries to extract the tooth. After being unable to remove it, the rat gives up and tells Krazy to take over. Krazy tries to pull the tooth but finds it very difficult. He even goes as far as entering the hippo's stomach but to no avail. As a last resort, Krazy places a stick of dynamite in the cavity of the tooth and lights the fuse. Following the blast, Krazy takes the now separated tooth, and even receives payment as a money note falls from the sky. The hippo, however, is nowhere to be seen. The film ends with Krazy sitting on the tooth.

== See also ==
- Krazy Kat filmography
