= The Feather Pushers =

1925 film

- Directed by: Bill Nolan
- Color process: Black and white
- Production company: Margaret J. Winkler
- Release date: January 15, 1926
- Running time: 5:50
- Country: United States
- Language: English

The Feather Pushers is a 1926 short animated film featuring Krazy Kat. It is one of the few Krazy films directed by Bill Nolan who started the third season after the character had two runs previously. It has occasionally been mis-cited as Feather Duster for 1925, but no film by that name appears in the 1925 film magazines or in books about Krazy Kat, but The Feather Pushers appears in January. The release date is also sometimes written as April, but Motion Picture News announced it as a January release. It is not known whether the name is a sendup of a popular boxing series beginning in 1922, The Leather Pushers.

== Plot ==
The short film

Inside a house, a maid is dusting some ornaments. She then puts down her duster and goes somewhere. A woman enters the room. This woman finds the duster a good hat accessory before putting it on, and going away. The maid returns to the scene and is shocked to see her duster missing. Krazy, who is wandering outside, hears her weeping and comes inside. He feels sorry for her, and decides to help out.

Wandering the outside again, Krazy spots a turkey, but before he could take a feather, the turkey is able to lose him. Krazy then spots what appears to be another turkey but is a parasol.

After some trouble with an escaped prisoner, Krazy sees a feathery figure behind a light post, where it is revealed to be a bomb-wielding spy, who hurls a bomb at Krazy which blasts the cat sky high. Krazy then lands on a buzzard, and tries to take some tail feathers. The buzzard, however, tosses Krazy away before he can take any. Back on the ground, Krazy comes across a tent where a gremlin with a feather hat emerges. Krazy takes the feathers from the latter's hat, and flees. The gremlin calls out a bigger companion who starts hurling darts at Krazy.

Krazy safely returns to the maid's house. As he presents the new duster with the feathers he collected, the maid is overjoyed. The maid rewards Krazy with kisses and food.

== See also ==
- Krazy Kat filmography
