= Lee Blair (artist) =

American artist

- Born: Lee Blair; October 1, 1911; Los Angeles, California, United States
- Died: April 19, 1993 (aged 81); Soquel, California, United States
- Spouse: Mary Blair (m. 1934; died 1978)
- Relatives: Preston Blair (brother)

Medal record

Art competitions

Representing the United States

Olympic Games
Gold medal – first place	1932 Los Angeles	Watercolors and drawings

Lee Everett Blair (October 1, 1911 – April 19, 1993) was an American artist. He was born in Los Angeles, California and died in Soquel, California. He was the younger brother of Preston Blair and the husband of Mary Blair.

In 1932 he won a gold medal in the art competitions of the Olympic Games for his "Rodeo".
