= Seeing Stars (1932 film) =

1932 short animated film

- Directed by: Ben Harrison; Manny Gould
- Story by: Ben Harrison
- Produced by: Charles Mintz
- Music by: Joe DeNat
- Animation by: Allen Rose; Harry Love
- Color process: Black and white
- Production company: Charles Mintz Studio
- Distributed by: Columbia Pictures
- Release date: September 12, 1932
- Running time: 7:19
- Language: English

Seeing Stars is a 1932 short animated film distributed by Columbia Pictures, and features Krazy Kat. Different from most shorts of the series, the cartoon features celebrities in their animated forms.

== Plot ==
At a music hall, a trio of singers perform by their microphones while an orchestra plays behind them. Enjoying their act are guests who dance in a square similar to a boxing ring. When the musicians stop to play another song, the square carrying some of the guests gets moved out and replaced by another one.

A stuttering announcer (Roscoe Ates) introduces the special guest of the event, none other than Krazy Kat. To entertain the crowd in attendance, Krazy plays some short tunes on a piano, which is carried to him by mice. The first tune Krazy Kat plays is Merrily We Roll Along. After a first successful performance he is interrupted by Joe E. Brown's high-pitched yelping, but Krazy literally zips his mouth shut. As he continues playing, Marx Brothers: Groucho, Chico, Zeppo and Harpo pop out of the piano and shake hands with him before leaving on a tandem bicycle. Halfway Harpo hops off to run after a young woman. As she dashes into the kitchen, he follows her, but is kicked out by an African-American female cook.

When Krazy is about to continue playing his instrument, he is interrupted by a noise coming from one of the tables. At that table, Laurel and Hardy are eating peas and roast chicken. While Hardy is eating with ease, Laurel appears to be having difficulty. When he scoops up peas with a spoon, they often fall off and make a sound that's quite loud to some. Bothered by this, Hardy provides assistance. Krazy then comes to their table and asks them to be as quiet as possible.

Thinking about having a little meal, Krazy sees a cross-eyed man (Ben Turpin) eating spaghetti. Krazy comes to the man's table and decides to have a share of the food. While they eat, a waiter (Jimmy Durante) carrying fruits in a bowl is passing by, and those nearby grab anything they can get. Krazy also tries to pick a fruit but mistakenly grabs the waiter's long nose instead, much to the latter's annoyance. In reply, the waiter mumbles a few words and splats the platter of spaghetti right on top of Krazy. As the cat is covered in spaghetti Harpo takes the opportunity to play him as a harp, before getting distracted again by a woman passing by. Krazy gets cleaned up by someone from another table who uses a seltzer bottle.

Still wandering the music hall, Krazy notices the orchestra is fast asleep. He then wakes them up with a gun, which wakes them up and motivates them to start playing again. Krazy starts dancing at the center of the floor, and all those he came across join him there. Some other stars had not appeared earlier, namely Charlie Chaplin, Buster Keaton, Marie Dressler, Tom Mix, Maurice Chevalier and Harold Lloyd. Watching from the tables, the audience enjoy the celebration.

== Availability ==
- Columbia Cartoon Collection: Volume 3

== See also ==
- Krazy Kat filmography
