= Love's Labor Lost (film) =

1920 Krazy Kat cartoon by Bray Productions

- Directed by: Vernon Stallings
- Produced by: John Randolph Bray
- Color process: Black and white
- Production company: Bray Studios
- Distributed by: Goldwyn Pictures
- Release date: January 30, 1920
- Running time: 3:33
- Language: English

Love's Labor Lost is a 1920 short animated film by Bray Studios and is one of the silent Krazy Kat cartoons. The film's title references a play by William Shakespeare.

== Plot ==
The short film

Ignatz Mouse is sitting on a rock at a silent place. He then sees a charming girl hippo and develops an affection for her right after waving hello, despite the size difference. An elephant, probably a policeman, sees his steady girlfriend hippo and approaches to court her. The elephant sits next to the hippo on a bench and tickles her chin using its trunk. The elephant gently elbows the hippo in a loving sense, and she responds by slapping his face. The elephant then puts his hand in her hand. She moves his hand back to him. All of a sudden, the elephant gives her a tight hug, and the embarrassed hippo covers her face. Then the elephant pulls on a tree and hugs her again.

Just then, Krazy Kat comes to the area where Ignatz Mouse is. Krazy begins playing a song on his banjo. Ignatz Mouse even dances at the beginning, and then Krazy Kat catches the mouse, but the mouse slips out of the cat's paws. The mouse grabs Krazy's banjo and uses it to knock the cat down.

Ignatz Mouse then approaches the hippo and elephant and tries to serenade the hippo with the banjo. Because the elephant has a fear of rodents, the mouse drives the elephant away. Ignatz Mouse laughs at the elephant, and the hippo confesses that she loves a brave man. The hippo straightens her skirt while sitting on the bench, and Ignatz Mouse becomes excited. The mouse sits next to the hippo and gives her a little tickle, which makes her laugh. Ignatz Mouse unexpectedly kisses the hippo on the mouth, and she feels very happy and hugs the mouse.

After fleeing from the mouse, the elephant finds himself outside a tavern. He notices a barrel of Beevo, and drinks the contents of the barrel. The scene goes back to the hippo and Ignatz Mouse on a bench, where the hippo ends up sitting on the mouse unknowingly. The hippo notices that Ignatz has disappeared; she stands up and sees that she had just crushed the mouse. Then, Ignatz returns to his original form and laughs. The scene returns to the tavern, where the elephant is flexing his muscles and gaining the courage to confront the mouse. The elephant returns to the place where the mouse and hippo are sitting on the bench. The elephant hits the mouse with his trunk and jumps on him, smashing him to death, then covers the mouse with dirt. The elephant regains the hippo's attention, and she says, "I just dote on a brave man". Before the two lovers walk away, the elephant places the hippo's hat – that looks like a flowerpot – next to the mouse's grave.

Krazy Kat shows up to see what became of Ignatz Mouse. Saddened by the mouse's death, the cat plays a solemn tune on his banjo, and his tears shower upon the flowerpot. The pot's flower grows taller, and Ignatz Mouse's ghost appears at the top. Annoyed by Krazy's gesture, Ignatz Mouse strikes the feline off his feet with a brick before ascending to the great beyond.

== See also ==
- Krazy Kat filmography
