= Al Eugster =

American animator (1909–1997)

- Born: Alfred Julius Eugster; February 15, 1909; New York City, U.S.
- Died: May 2, 1997 (aged 88); Long Island, New York, U.S.
- Occupation: Animator
- Years active: 1925–1987
- Employer(s): Pat Sullivan Studios (1925–1929); Fleischer Studios (1929–1932, 1939–1942); The Charles Mintz Studio (1932); Animated Pictures (1933–1935); Walt Disney Productions (1935–1939); Famous Studios/Paramount Cartoon Studios (1942-1967); Pelican Films/Animation Central (1950s-1960s); Felix The Cat Productions/Joe Oriolo (1958-60); Kim and Gifford (1967-1987)
- Spouse: Hazel Scott (m. 1934; died 1995)

Alfred Julius Eugster (February 11, 1909 – January 1, 1997) was an American animator, writer, and film director. He worked for a number of American animation studios, including Fleischer Studios, Animated Pictures, Walt Disney Productions, and Famous Studios/Paramount Cartoon Studios.

== Personal ==
Al Eugster was born on February 11, 1909, in New York City. His parents were musician Julius Eugster and Hedwig Fiegel, both were from German descent. Between 1915 and 1919, his dad died when he was just a child. At the age of 16, he got paid $10 a week for doing jobs and the American Radiator Company. Al Eugster was married to his wife Hazel, also known as Chick, for 61 years. The two had no children, and Hazel died in 1995.

== Career ==
Eugster began his career in animation in April 1925 where he worked at the Pat Sullivan studio. He would blacken in the drawing of Felix the Cat. During his time working for the Pat Sullivan studio, he worked under Otto Messmer. Eugster attended Cooper Union at nighttime to study art while also working. Al Eugster then left Sullivan's Studio in April 1929 and moved to Fleischer Studios. Eugster would return to Fleischer in 1939. In 1932, Eugster went to work for Charles Mintz. He worked with Preston Blair on many films, most notably, Krazy Kat cartoons. Just a year later, he went on to work for Ub Iwerks where he co-animated several ComiColor shorts with Shamus Culhane.

Eugster worked at Animated Pictures Corp. until 1935, when he joined Walt Disney Productions. His specialty while at Disney studio was the animation of Donald Duck as well as the works of Snow White. Eugster left Disney on March 18, 1939, due to an offer from Max Fleischer in Miami for a higher salary. Eugster re-joined Fleischer in 1939 and stayed with them until the studio closed down in 1942. He would work briefly at Famous Studios but left for the US Army. After his release from the Army, he returned to Famous in 1945. Here he was the head animator and worked on a number of Screen Songs and Popeye cartoons until 1957. From 1957 to 1964, Eugster freelanced throughout New York working for various commercial studios. These included Pelican Films (headed by Jack Zander), Animation Central (where he became head of the company in 1959, a position which lasted less than a year), and Joe Oriolo’s studio on the Felix the Cat television cartoons. In 1964, he joined Paramount where he worked for Shamus Culhane and Ralph Bakshi until the studio closed in 1967. The following year, he joined Kim and Gifford, where he began his longest stay at a single studio. In September 1987, Eugster retired from Kim and Gifford, ending his 62-year career.
