= Preston Blair =

American animator (1908–1995)

- Born: Preston Erwin Blair; October 24, 1908; Redlands, California
- Died: April 19, 1995 (aged 86); Santa Cruz, California
- Occupation: Animator
- Years active: 1930–1995
- Employer(s): Romer Grey Studios (1930-1931); Universal Cartoon Studios (1931); The Charles Mintz Studio/Screen Gems (1931-1937); Walt Disney Productions (1937-1941); MGM (1941-1950)
- Relatives: Lee Everett Blair (brother); Mary Blair (sister-in-law)

Preston Erwin Blair (October 24, 1908 – April 19, 1995) was an American animator. He is best remembered for his character animation work at Walt Disney Productions and the Metro-Goldwyn-Mayer cartoon department.

A native of Redlands, California, Blair began his animation career in the early 1930s at the Romer Gray Studio, but due to the studio not keeping up with his salary, he moved to Walter Lantz Productions. He later moved over to Charles Mintz's Screen Gems studio, and in the late 1930s moved over to the Disney studio following numerous failed application attempts. At Disney, Blair animated cartoon short subjects, Mickey Mouse scenes in "The Sorcerer's Apprentice" section of Fantasia (1940), and the hippo-alligator dance in Fantasia's "Dance of the Hours" sequence. He also did some work on Walt Disney's Pinocchio (1940) and Bambi (1942).

Blair left Disney after the Disney animators' strike, and was hired to work for Tex Avery's unit at MGM. There, he became particularly known for animating the titular female character in Red Hot Riding Hood. "Red" later re-appeared in more Avery cartoons, including Swing Shift Cinderella, Little Rural Riding Hood, Uncle Tom's Cabana and the Droopy cartoons The Shooting of Dan McGoo and Wild and Woolfy, with animation by Blair. In the late 1940s, Blair teamed with Avery animator Michael Lah to direct several Barney Bear cartoons, although their unit was dissolved after the completion of only three shorts. Afterwards, he moved to Connecticut and made some animated industrial shorts for his brother Lee in New York.

Blair continued his career in animation into the 1960s, working on The Flintstones at Hanna-Barbera. He is better known, however, as an author of animation instructional books for Walter Foster Publishing. His first book, Animation, was published in 1948 and originally included images of the MGM & Disney cartoon characters he had animated, who were redrawn to obscure their origins in the second edition of the book. Blair would write many more animation how-to texts over the next forty years, culminating with Cartoon Animation (1994), a 224-page book which compiles most of the content from his previous books. A new edition of "Cartoon Animation" was published in November 2020 by Walter Foster Publishing, an imprint of The Quarto Group.

Preston Blair was the brother of artist Lee Everett Blair and the brother-in-law of artist and designer Mary Blair. He died on April 19, 1995 from heart failure.
