= Harry Love (animator) =

American animator and film producer

- Born: April 1, 1911; Brooklyn, New York, US
- Died: February 27, 1997 (aged 85); Burbank, California, US
- Occupations: Animator, director, producer, writer, storyboard artist
- Years active: 1928–1989
- Employers: Harrison/Gould Cartoons (1928–1929); Screen Gems (1929–1941); Walt Disney Productions (1941–1946); Oscar Productions (1946–1947); Warner Bros. Cartoons (1947–1963); DePatie–Freleng Enterprises (1963–1973); Bakshi Productions (1973); Krantz Films (1974); Hanna-Barbera (1974–1989)

Harry Love (April 1, 1911 – February 27, 1997) was an American animator, effects animator, director, producer, production coordinator, and writer.

== Early life ==
Harry Love was born in 1911 in Brooklyn, New York, to a poor working-class family. His talent of drawing was showing at a young age. At the age of 14 he won the first of several gold prizes from local department stores. He graduated from school at the age of 16 and received a medal from Mayor Fiorello La Guardia.

== Career ==
Love began his career at the Ben Harrison and Manny Gould studio in 1927. At the time, he was so young (16 years old), that he could not legally sign his contract. He then worked at the Charles Mintz Studio in 1929. In 1930, he would move with Mintz to Los Angeles, which the studio would later become Screen Gems. Mintz acquired the rights to Krazy Kat, from William Randolph Hearst, which he wrote and directed 20 Krazy cartoons. His first screenplay was for Krazy's Shoe Shop. He also worked on the Scrappy cartoons.

After the Mintz Studio collapsed, he worked for Disney, mainly for war-time cartoons, such as Victory Through Air Power and Reason and Emotion. After World War II was over, he went to Warner Bros. Cartoons from 1948 to 1964, where he animated Looney Tunes and Merrie Melodies shorts starring Bugs Bunny, Porky Pig, and others, like What's Opera Doc, Tweet Tweet Tweety, and Hot Cross Bunny. He also was a production coordinator on The Incredible Mr. Limpet. By 1950, he was receiving credit in WB's animated shorts, usually as an effects animator. In 1954, he was involved in a car accident, which he lived shortly after it, and he said he was lucky to be alive. In February 1956, he had to have additional surgery for his injured leg, which took 2 days. After the original Warner Bros. Cartoons studio shut down in 1963, he went to DePatie–Freleng Enterprises (for 10 years, 1963–1973) and produced The Pink Panther Show, Doctor Dolittle, and Dr. Seuss specials like The Lorax and The Cat in The Hat. The naturalistic flash-and-smoke explosions in Warner's cartoons and many of the later DePatie-Freleng releases are his creations. In the 1970s, he worked mostly in film production with Ralph Bakshi on Heavy Traffic and the film without Bakshi's involvement The Nine Lives of Fritz the Cat. He was widely respected in the animation industry for his friendly personality plus his drafting, management and writing skills. After Fritz the Cat, he worked at Hanna-Barbera from 1974 to 1989 (15 years), and even started an animation college for the younger employees in 1976, eventually retiring in 1989.

== Death ==
Love died from a heart attack in Burbank, California on February 27, 1997.
