= Manny Gould =

American animator (1904–1975)

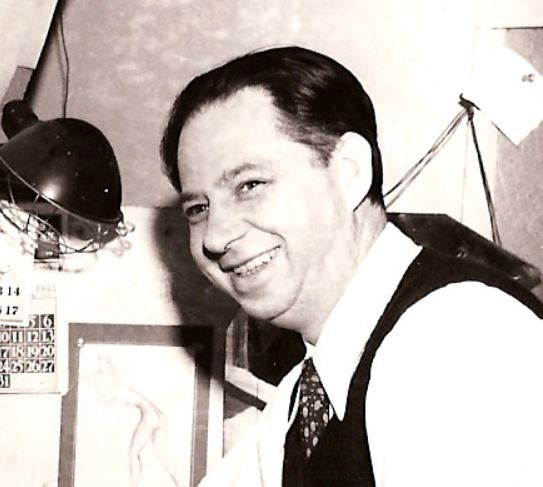
- Manny Gould in 1945
- Born: Emanuel Gould; May 30, 1904; New York City, U.S.
- Died: July 19, 1975 (aged 71); Los Angeles, California, U.S.
- Other name: M. Gould
- Occupations: Animator, writer, director
- Years active: 1925–1974
- Employers: Screen Gems (1925–1941, 1946–1947); Warner Bros. Cartoons (1943–1949); Jerry Fairbanks Productions (1947–1951); Lou Lilly Prods (1951–1964); Ed Graham Productions (1965); DePatie–Freleng Enterprises (1965–1973); Bakshi Productions (1973); Levitow-Hanson Films (1973); Krantz Films (1974)
- Relatives: 4

Emanuel Gould (May 30, 1904 – July 19, 1975) was an American animated cartoonist from the 1920s to the 1970s, best known for his contributions as a director, writer and animator for Screen Gems, and as an animator for Warner Bros. Cartoons and DePatie–Freleng Enterprises.

== Career ==
Manny Gould's career as an animator began as a teenager working for several New York-based animation studios, such as the Barre-Bowers Studio, the Jefferson Film Corporation, and Inkwell Studios. After being accused by the Fleischer's for infringement, he would leave and later partner with Ben Harrison, Burt Gillett and Dick Huemer to form the short-lived Associated Animators Studio in 1925. They later moved to Winkler Pictures to work on the Krazy Kat cartoon series as animators, writers and directors. Gould and Harrison would then form another studio, Harrison-Gould, to produce the Krazy Kat cartoons for Winkler.

After Charles Mintz took over Winkler Pictures, the studio was moved to Los Angeles in 1929 to develop The Charles Mintz Studio (later renamed Screen Gems) after establishing a partnership with Columbia Pictures. Also going with him were his sister Martha Barbara Gould and brothers Louis R., Allen, and Will Gould, a sports cartoonist for the Bronx Home News who drew the syndicated strip Red Barry in the 1930s and became a television and movie screenwriter. Rather than using their own studio, Gould and Harrison were subsequently assigned a unit within Screen Gems, which they helmed as co-directors, animators and storymen for the following decade.

While Harrison's departure in 1940 dissolved their longtime partnership, Gould would continue to work for Screen Gems until 1941, when Columbia reorganized the studio by dismissing all of its Mintz-era staff. He would later move to Leon Schlesinger Productions (soon renamed Warner Bros. Cartoons) in 1943, joining fellow Screen Gems alumnus Arthur Davis, Lou Lilly and Frank Tashlin. Gould would be placed as an animator for Bob Clampett's unit, and worked on shorts such as Buckaroo Bugs (1944), Baby Bottleneck (1946), The Great Piggy Bank Robbery (1946) and The Big Snooze (1946). Clampett however, soon left Warner Bros. Cartoons, and his unit was given to Arthur Davis. Gould would animate Davis' first three shorts until he moved to Robert McKimson's unit months later; his first on-screen credit under McKimson appears on 1947's Crowing Pains. Gould would also briefly moonlight back in Screen Gems in at least three cartoons; Snap Happy Traps (1946), Cockatoos for Two (1947) and Mother Hubba-Hubba Hubbard (1947).

Gould was hired in 1947 by Jerry Fairbanks Productions as a director for its animation department, where Lilly had gone to head the story department. His last credited cartoon at Warner Bros. (the Bugs Bunny short The Windblown Hare) was released in 1949, with his final contribution being Hippety Hopper the same year, where he was left uncredited. Lilly formed his own commercial animation company in 1952 and by the late 1950s hired Gould to be his animation director.

== Style ==
Gould's animation is noted for its loose, rubbery animation style. His style relies heavily on a strong emphasis in character acting, funny walk cycles and extensive use of distortion. Gould also uses a foreshortening effect by having the characters limbs extend more closer to the screen, giving his animation more three dimension over other animators. Devon Baxter notes Gould's style for its "broad distortion and foreshortening", while Micheal Barrier akin's his animation to "gaudy mini-carnivals".

== Later career and death ==
In 1964, Gould returned to his career in animation in a more involved manner, beginning with the Warner Bros. commercial department. He would also animate the Linus the Lionhearted television cartoons for Ed Graham Productions. Gould's biggest contribution during this time period was his role as an animator for DePatie-Freleng Enterprises, where he would work on The Pink Panther, The Ant and the Aardvark, Tijuana Toads and the Dr. Seuss animated adaptions. He also worked on the cartoon features Heavy Traffic for Ralph Bakshi and The Nine Lives of Fritz the Cat for Steve Krantz.

Gould died of cancer on July 19, 1975, the same week where he was supposed to be interviewed by Milton Gray.
