= Magic hat =

Magic hat may refer to:

- Magic Hat Brewing Company, an American brewery

== Film and television ==
- The Magic Top Hat, a 1932 German film
- Magical Hat, a Japanese anime television series
- Harriet's Magic Hats, a Canadian television series
- Willoughby's Magic Hat, a 1943 American animated short film

== Hats ==
- Hat-trick (magic trick), a classic magic trick where a performer will produce an object out of an apparently empty top hat
- Witch hat, a style of hat worn by witches in popular culture depictions, characterized by a conical crown and a wide brim

== Literature ==
- The Magic Hat, a 2002 book by Mem Fox and Tricia Tusa
- The Hat (book), a 1970 book by Tomi Ungerer

== See also ==
- Sorcerer's Hat, a structure and the thematic icon of Disney's Hollywood Studios, the third of four theme parks built at the Walt Disney World Resort
