= The Mouse Exterminator =

- Directed by: Allen Rose
- Produced by: Charles Mintz
- Starring: Danny Webb
- Music by: Joe DeNat
- Animation by: Harry Love
- Color process: Black and white
- Production company: Screen Gems
- Distributed by: Columbia Pictures
- Release date: January 26, 1940
- Running time: 6:26
- Language: English

The Mouse Exterminator is a 1940 short animated film in the Phantasies series, produced and distributed by Columbia Pictures. It marks the final theatrical appearance of Krazy Kat, the title character from George Herriman's comic strip.

== Plot ==
Krazy, as the cartoon's title implies, is a mouse exterminator in his office. He immediately receives a phone call about a rodent problem.

The cat arrives at the home of his caller. Unable to grasp the mouse out of the hole in the wall, Krazy decides to attract the mouse out using a wind-up toy looking like a girl mouse. Although he successfully lures the little nuisance out and even gets his paws on it, the mouse returns to its lair. Krazy then resorts to using a rifle and starts firing at the hole. The mouse then shows up in front of Krazy, claiming to be powerless, and seemingly asks for mercy. Krazy falls for the pretense and starts to feel guilty. When the two shake hands, the mouse pulls Krazy into the hole until the cat's head is crammed in. The mouse begins pummeling Krazy's face like a speed bag. When Krazy returns to firing his rifle at the hole, the mouse repeats the same trick before pounding the cat with a mallet.

Having enough of the mouse's trickery, Krazy takes a vacuum cleaner to pull in his prey. As the mouse gets sucked in the cleaner, Krazy believes he solved the problem as he calls the homeowner, but the mouse comes out of the vacuum bag and is determined to get back at Krazy. The mouse switches on the vacuum near an unsuspecting Krazy who then gets sucked in with only his head sticking out. The cartoon ends with Krazy receiving one final blow to the face.

== See also ==
- Krazy Kat filmography
