= Kate and Jol Temple =

Australian children's authors

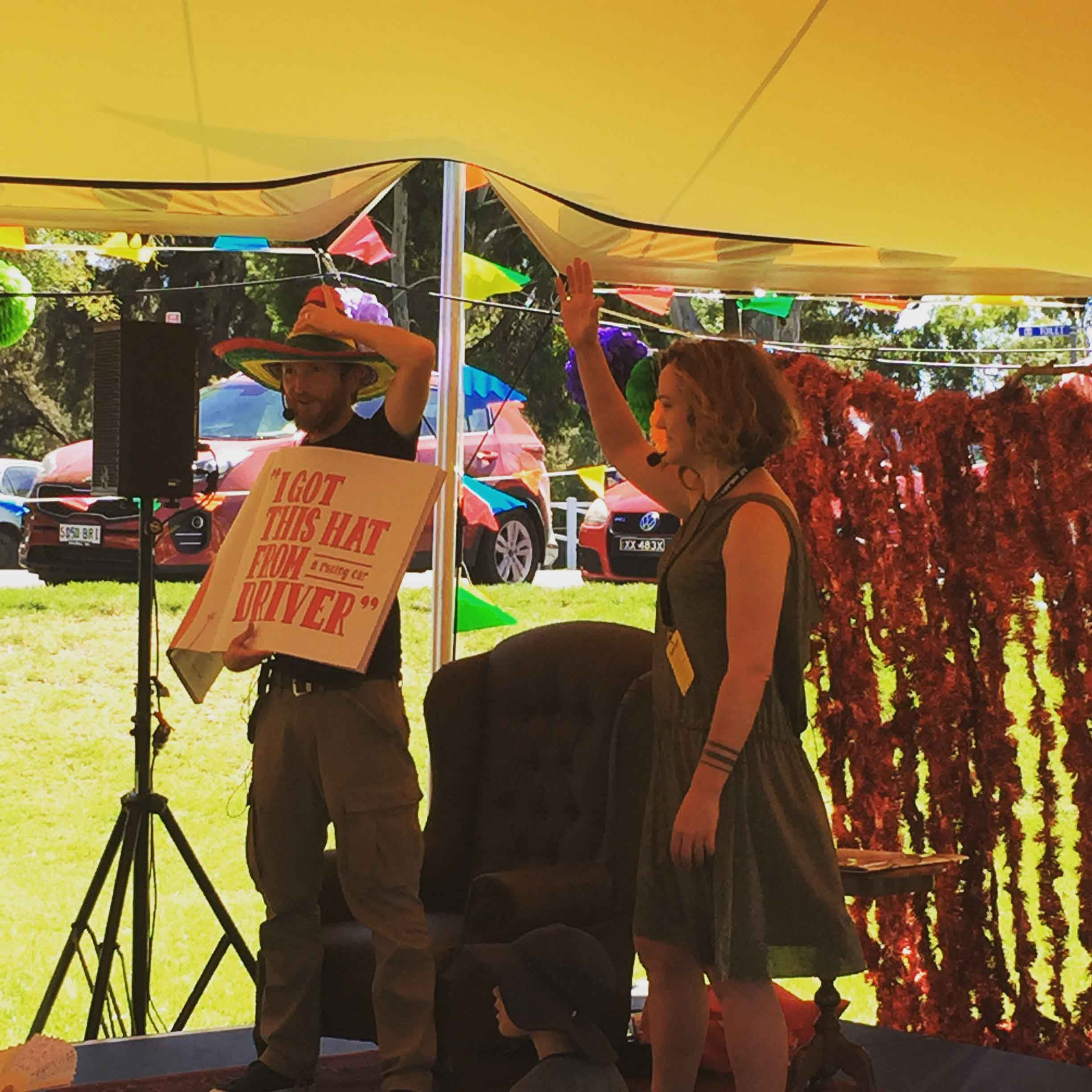
- Kate and Jol Temple at Adelaide Writers' Festival 2018
- Occupation: Children's Authors
- Writing career
- Genre: Humour
- Notable works: Parrot Carrot (2012); I Got This Hat (2014)
- Notable awards: Charlotte Huck Award (2020)
- Website: katejoltemple.com

Kate and Jol Temple are Australian children's authors. They are the 2020 winners of the Charlotte Huck Award for book Room on Our Rock. They are also widely known for their 2017 Children's Book Council of Australia Honour Book Captain Jimmy Cook Discovers Third Grade, published by Allen and Unwin. The book was praised for its use of humour and history.

Their picture book, I Got This Hat, was the 2016 National Simultaneous Storytime book and read by more than half a million children on the same day at the same time. The book is published by HarperCollins. The book has also been produced as an app with funding from the Australia Council for the Arts.

== Awards and honors ==
Awards for the Temple's books
| Year | Title | Award | Result | Ref. |
|---|---|---|---|---|
| 2017 | Captain Jimmy Cook Discovers Third Grade | CBCA Book of the Year: Younger Readers | Honour | |
| 2018 | Captain Jimmy Cook Discovers X Marks the Spot | CBCA Book of the Year: Younger Readers | Notable | |
| 2019 | Room on Our Rock | CBCA Book of the Year: Picture Book | Notable | |
| 2020 | Room On Our Rock | Charlotte Huck Award | Winner | |
| 2021 | Bin Chicken | CBCA Book of the Year: Early Childhood | Notable | |
| 2024 | That Bird Has Arms | CBCA Book of the Year: Picture Book | Notable | |

== Publications ==
=== Picture books ===
==== Bin Chicken books ====
The Bin Chicken books are illustrated by Ronojoy Ghosh and published by Scholastic Australia.

- Bin Chicken (Scholastic, 2020)
- Bin Chicken Flies Again (2022)
- Bin Chicken and the Christmas Turkey (2022)

==== Standalone books ====
- Parrot Carrot, illustrated by Jon Foye (Allen & Unwin, 2011)
- I Got This Hat, illustrated by Jon Foye (HarperCollins, 2013)
- Mike I Don't Like, illustrated by Jon Foye (ABC Books, 2014)
- Room On Our Rock, illustrated by Terri Rose Baynton (Scholastic, 2018)
- Are You My Bottom, illustrated by Ronojoy Ghosh (Allen & Unwin, 2018)
- Move That Mountain, illustrated by Terri Rose Baynton (Scholastic, 2020)
- Winner Winner Bin Chicken Dinner, illustrated by Ronojoy Ghosh (Scholastic, 2021)
- That Bird Has Arms!, illustrated by Niharika Hukku and Rono Joy Ghosh (exp. 2023)

=== Children's novels ===
==== Alice Toolie book ====
The Alice Toolie books are illustrated by Grace West and published by Allen & Unwin.

1. Yours Troolie, Alice Toolie (2018)
2. The Birthday Wars: Yours Troolie (2019)
3. The Battle of Book Week: Yours Troolie (2020)

==== Captain Jimmy Cook series ====
1. Captain Jimmy Cook Discovers Third Grade (2016)
2. Captain Jimmy Cook Discovers X Marks The Spot (2017)

==== Trilby Moffat series ====
1. The Dangerous Business of Being Trilby Moffat (Hachette Australia, 2022)
2. The Perilous Promotion of Trilby Moffat (Lothian Children's Books, exp. 2023)

==== The Underdogs series ====
The Underdog books are illustrated by Shiloh Gordon and published by Hardie Grant Children's Publishing.

1. The Underdogs Catch a Cat Burglar (2021)
2. The Underdogs Fake it Til They Make It (2021)
3. The Underdogs Hit a Grand Slam (2022)
4. The Underdogs Rock 'n' Roll Over (2022)
5. The Underdogs Fish for Trouble
