= Phantasies =

1939–1948 animated film series

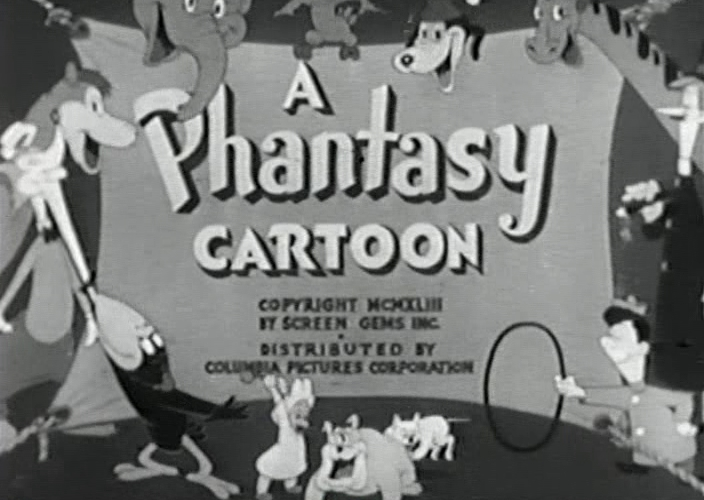
- Title card used in 1943
- Production company: Screen Gems
- Distributed by: Columbia Pictures
- Country: United States
- Language: English

Phantasy is a series of animated cartoons produced by the Screen Gems studio for Columbia Pictures from 1939 to 1946. This series, along with the Fable cartoons, were brought in to replace the Scrappy and Krazy Kat series, although they would be featured in some cartoons. The series, featuring characters such as Willoughby Wren and Superkatt, is notable as being the last theatrical animated series produced in black-and-white by a major studio. To cut costs, Columbia did not move the Phantasies out of black-and-white until the end of 1946, when it went to all-Cinecolor production. While the Screen Gems studio closed in 1946, the completed Phantasy cartoons continued to be released until 1948.

== Filmography ==
No.	Title	Release date	Director	Character(s)	Notes
1	The Charm Bracelet	September 1, 1939	Allen Rose	Scrappy	
2	The Millionaire Hobo	November 24, 1939	Arthur Davis	Scrappy	
3	The Mouse Exterminator	January 26, 1940	Allen Rose	Krazy Kat	Final Columbia cartoon featuring Krazy Kat.
4	Man of Tin	February 23, 1940	Allen Rose	Scrappy	
5	Fish Follies	May 10, 1940	Allen Rose	Scrappy	
6	News Oddities	July 19, 1940	Allen Rose		Listed as a Krazy Kat cartoon in TV packages despite the character not appearing in this short at all.
7	School Boy Dreams	September 24, 1940	Allen Rose	Scrappy	
8	Happy Holidays	October 25, 1940	Allen Rose		Features Scrappy's younger brother Oopy
9	The Little Theatre	February 7, 1941	Allen Rose	Scrappy	Final cartoon featuring Scrappy
10	There's Music in Your Hair	March 28, 1941	Arthur Davis		
11	The Cute Recruit	May 2, 1941	Arthur Davis	Cornelius Van Goon	Features Van Goon from A Helping Paw and The Cuckoo IQ (both 1941). Called Algernon in this short.
12	The Wallflower	July 3, 1941	Ben Harrison		
13	The Merry Mouse Cafe	August 15, 1941	Allen Rose		Final Phantasy to credit the director under Story.
14	The Crystal Gazer	September 26, 1941	Sid Marcus	Cornelius Van Goon	First Phantasy with a director credit. Final appearance of Van Goon. Plays Professor Za-Za Raja.
15	Dog Meets Dog	March 6, 1942	Alec Geiss	Butch Bulldog	Debut of Butch
16	The Wild and Woozy West	April 30, 1942	Lou Lilly		
17	A Battle for a Bottle	May 29, 1942	Alec Geiss	Butch Bulldog	
18	Old Blackout Joe	August 27, 1942	John Hubley and Paul Sommer		John Hubley's directorial debut
19	The Gullible Canary	September 18, 1942	Alec Geiss		
20	The Dumbconscious Mind	October 23, 1942	John Hubley and Paul Sommer	Butch Bulldog	
21	Malice in Slumberland	November 20, 1942	Alec Geiss		
22	Cholly Polly	December 18, 1942	Alec Geiss		
23	The Vitamin G-Man	January 22, 1943	John Hubley and Paul Sommer		
24	Kindly Scram	March 5, 1943	Alec Geiss	Igor Puzzlewitz	Debut of Igor Puzzlewitz
25	Willoughby's Magic Hat	April 30, 1943	Bob Wickersham	Willoughby Wren	Debut of Willoughby Wren
26	Duty and the Beast	May 28, 1943	Alec Geiss	Igor Puzzlewitz	
27	Mass Mouse Meeting	June 25, 1943	Alec Geiss		
28	The Fly in the Ointment	July 23, 1943	Paul Sommer		
29	Dizzy Newsreel	August 27, 1943	Alec Geiss		
30	Nursery Crimes	October 8, 1943	Alec Geiss	Professor J. Snuffington Snodgrass	
31	The Cocky Bantam	November 12, 1943	Paul Sommer		
32	The Playful Pest	December 3, 1943	Paul Sommer		
33	Polly Wants a Doctor	January 6, 1944	Howard Swift		
34	Magic Strength	February 4, 1944	Bob Wickersham	Willoughby Wren	
35	Lionel Lion	March 3, 1944	Paul Sommer		Out of circulation.
36	Giddy-Yapping	April 7, 1944	Howard Swift	Igor Puzzlewitz	
37	Mr. Fore by Fore	June 7, 1944	Howard Swift	Igor Puzzlewitz	
38	Tangled Travels	June 9, 1944	Alec Geiss		
39	The Case of the Screaming Bishop	August 4, 1944	Howard Swift		
40	Mutt 'n' Bones	August 25, 1944	Paul Sommer	Butch Bulldog	Final appearance of Butch.
41	As the Fly Flies	November 17, 1944	Howard Swift	Igor Puzzlewitz	Final appearance of Igor Puzzlewitz.
42	Goofy News Views	April 27, 1945	Sid Marcus		
43	Booby Socks	July 12, 1945	Howard Swift and Bob Wickersham		
44	Simple Siren	September 20, 1945	Paul Sommer		
45	Kongo-Roo	April 18, 1946	Howard Swift		
46	Snap Happy Traps	June 6, 1946	Bob Wickersham		
47	The Schooner the Better	July 4, 1946	Howard Swift		Last cartoon in black and white. Final black-and-white theatrical cartoon of the golden age of American animation.
48	Fowl Brawl	January 19, 1947	Howard Swift		Lost cartoon. Starting with this short, all Phantasies are in Cinecolor.
49	The Uncultured Vulture	February 6, 1947	Bob Wickersham		
50	Wacky Quacky	March 20, 1947	Alex Lovy		
51	Leave Us Chase It	May 15, 1947	Howard Swift	Superkatt	
52	Tooth or Consequences	June 5, 1947	Howard Swift	The Fox and the Crow	
53	Kitty Caddy	November 6, 1947	Sid Marcus	Klever Kat	
54	Topsy Turkey	February 5, 1948	Sid Marcus		
55	Short Snorts on Sports	June 3, 1948	Alex Lovy		Final Phantasy short. Lost cartoon.

== See also ==
- Color Classics
- Noveltoons
- Modern Madcaps
- Animated Antics
- ComiColor Cartoons
- Happy Harmonies
- Merrie Melodies
- Rainbow Parade
- Silly Symphonies
- Swing Symphony
- Cartune Classics
- Puppetoons
- Color Rhapsody
- Terrytoons
