= Krazy Kat =

American comic strip

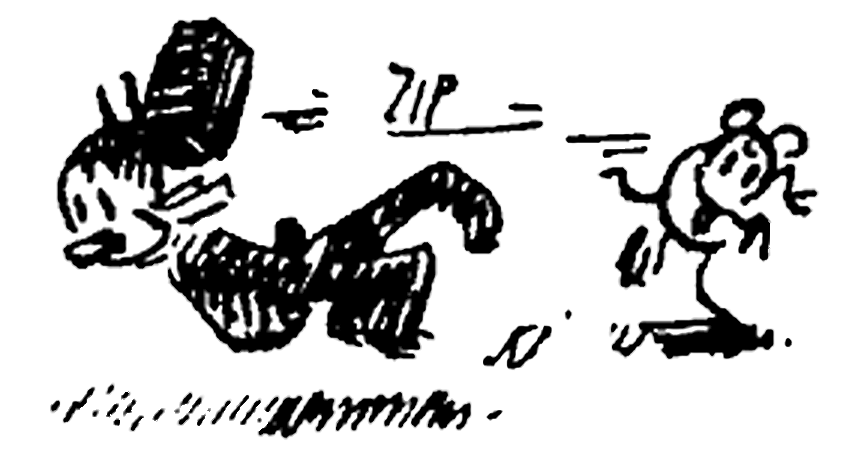
- Ignatz hurls a brick at Krazy Kat, who misinterprets it as an expression of love.
- Author: George Herriman
- Launch date: October 28, 1913; 113 years ago
- End date: June 25, 1944; 82 years ago
- Syndicate: King Features Syndicate
- Genre(s): Gag-a-day, humor, romance, self-reflexive comics, experimental comics

Krazy Kat (also known as Krazy & Ignatz in some reprints and compilations) is an American newspaper comic strip created by cartoonist George Herriman, which ran from 1913 to 1944. It first appeared in the New York Evening Journal, whose owner, William Randolph Hearst, was a major booster for the strip throughout its run. The characters had been introduced previously in a side strip in Herriman's earlier creation, The Dingbat Family, after earlier appearances in the Herriman comic strip Baron Bean. The phrase "Krazy Kat" originated there, spoken by the mouse by way of describing the cat. Set in a dreamlike portrayal of Herriman's vacation home of Coconino County, Arizona, Krazy Kat's mixture of offbeat surrealism, innocent playfulness and poetic, idiosyncratic language has made it a favorite of comics aficionados and art critics for more than 80 years.

The strip follows the curious relationship between a guileless, carefree, and simple-minded cat named Krazy and a short-tempered mouse named Ignatz. Krazy nurses an unrequited love for the mouse, but Ignatz despises Krazy and constantly throws bricks at Krazy's head, which Krazy misinterprets as a sign of affection while uttering grateful replies such as "Li'l dollink, allus f'etful", or "Li'l ainjil". A third principal character, Officer Bull Pupp, often appears and attempts to protect Krazy by thwarting Ignatz's attempts and imprisoning him. Later on, Officer Pupp falls in love with Krazy.

Despite the slapstick simplicity of the general premise, Krazy Kat one of the first comics to be widely praised by intellectuals and treated as "serious" art, because of Herriman's detailed characterization, combined with visual and verbal creativity. Art critic Gilbert Seldes wrote a lengthy panegyric to the strip in 1924, calling it "the most amusing and fantastic and satisfactory work of art produced in America today". Poet E. E. Cummings, another Herriman admirer, wrote the introduction to the first collection of the strip in book form. These critical appraisals by Seldes and Cummings were influential in establishing Krazy Kat's reputation as a work of genius. Though Krazy Kat was only a modest success during its initial run, in more recent years, many modern cartoonists have cited the strip as a major influence.

== Overview ==
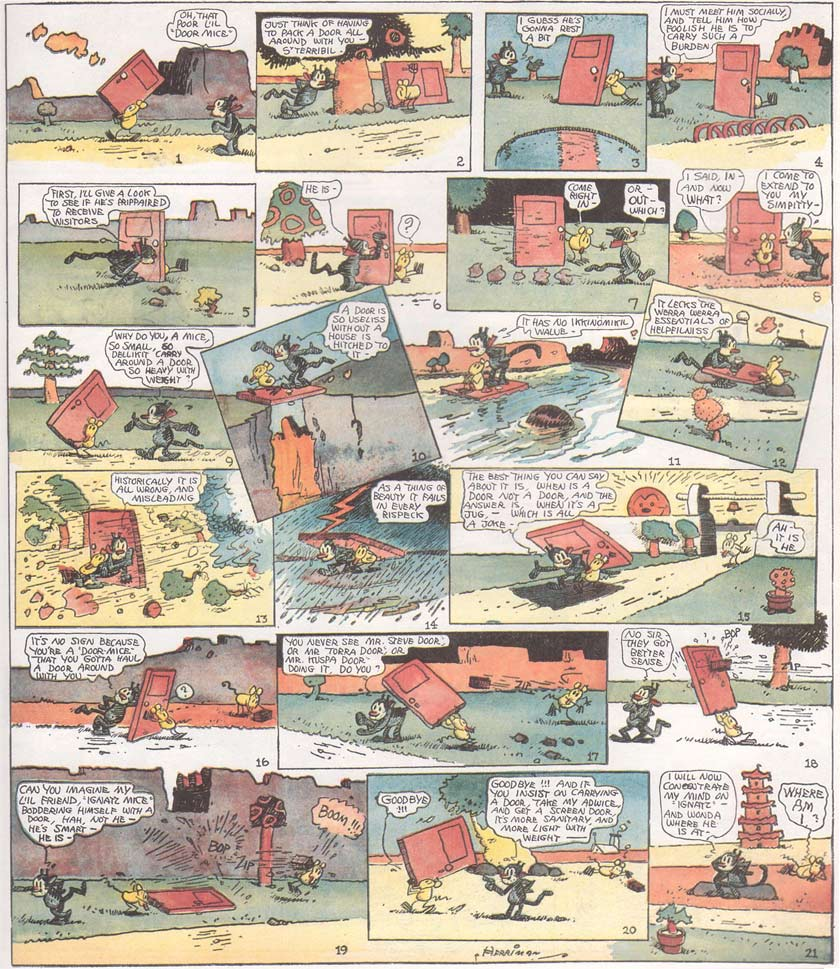
This January 21, 1922 page demonstrates the strip's characteristic ever-changing backgrounds as Krazy tries to understand why Door Mouse is carrying a door.

Krazy Kat takes place in a heavily stylized version of Coconino County, Arizona, with Herriman filling the page with caricatured flora and fauna, and rock formation landscapes typical of the Painted Desert. These backgrounds tend to change dramatically between panels, even while the characters remain stationary. While the local geography is fluid, certain sites were stable—and featured so often in the strip as to become iconic. These latter included Officer Pupp's jailhouse and Kolin Kelly's brickyard. A Southwestern visual style is evident throughout, with clay-shingled rooftops, trees planted in pots with designs imitating Navajo art, along with references to Mexican-American culture. The strip also occasionally features incongruous trappings borrowed from the stage, with curtains, backdrops, theatrical placards, and sometimes even floor lights framing the panel borders.

The descriptive passages mix whimsical, often alliterative language with phonetically-spelled dialogue and a strong poetic sensibility ("Agathla, centuries aslumber, shivers in its sleep with splenetic splendor, and spreads abroad a seismic spasm with the supreme suavity of a vagabond volcano"). Herriman was also fond of experimenting with unconventional page layouts in his Sunday strips, including panels of various shapes and sizes, arranged in whatever fashion he thought would best tell the story.

Though the basic concept of the strip is simple, Herriman always found ways to tweak the formula. Ignatz's plans to surreptitiously lob a brick at Krazy's head sometimes succeed; other times Officer Pupp outsmarts Ignatz and imprisons him. The interventions of Coconino County's other anthropomorphic animal residents, and even forces of nature, occasionally change the dynamic in unexpected ways. Other strips have Krazy's imbecilic or gnomic pronouncements irritating the mouse so much that he goes to seek out a brick in the final panel. Even self-referential humor is evident—in one strip, Officer Pupp, having arrested Ignatz, berates Herriman for not having finished drawing the jailhouse.

Public reaction at the time was mixed; many were puzzled by its iconoclastic refusal to conform to linear comic strip conventions and straightforward gags, but publishing magnate William Randolph Hearst loved Krazy Kat, and it continued to appear in his papers throughout its run, sometimes only by his direct order.

== Cast of characters ==
Krazy Kat
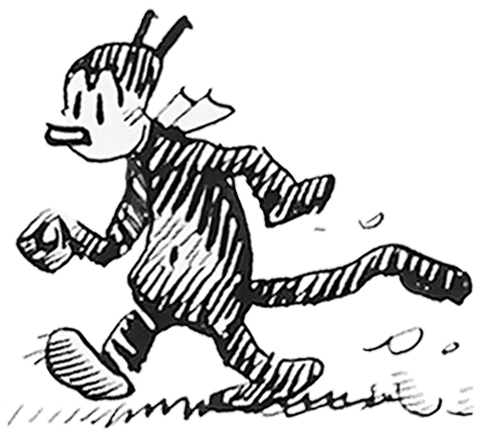
- Krazy Kat as seen in the December 17, 1918 Sunday strip

Publication information
- First appearance: 1910
- Created by: George Herriman
- Voiced by: Jack Carr (1930-1933); Billy Bletcher (1937); Mel Blanc (1937-1938); Leone Ledoux (1938); Danny Webb (1938-1940); Penny Phillips (1962-1964)

In-story information
- Species: Cat

=== Krazy Kat ===
Simple-minded, curious, mindlessly happy and perpetually innocent, the strip's title character drifts through life in Coconino County without a care. Krazy's dialogue is a highly stylized argot ("A fowl konspirissy – is it pussible?") phonetically evoking a mixture of English, French, Spanish, Yiddish and other dialects, often identified as George Herriman's own native New Orleans dialect, Yat. Often singing and dancing to express the Kat's eternal joy, Krazy is hopelessly in love with Ignatz and thinks that the mouse's brick-tossing is his way of returning that love. Krazy is also completely unaware of the bitter rivalry between Ignatz and "Offissa" Pupp and mistakes the dog's frequent imprisonment of the mouse for an innocent game of tag ("Ever times I see them two playing games togedda, Ignatz seems to be It"). On those occasions when Ignatz is caught before he can launch his brick, Krazy is left pining for the "l'il ainjil" and wonders where the beloved mouse has gone.

Krazy's own gender is never made clear and appears to be fluid, varying from strip to strip. Most authors post-Herriman (beginning with Cummings) have mistakenly referred to Krazy only as female, but Krazy's creator was more ambiguous and even published several strips poking fun at this uncertainty. When filmmaker Frank Capra, a fan of the strip, asked Herriman to straightforwardly define the character's sex, the cartoonist admitted that Krazy was "something like a sprite, an elf. They have no sex. So that Kat can't be a he or a she. The Kat's a spirit—a pixie—free to butt into anything". Most characters inside the strip use "he" and "him" to refer to Krazy. Once Ignatz asks Krazy "What's your real name?" and Krazy says "Wilhelmina ..."

=== Ignatz Mouse ===
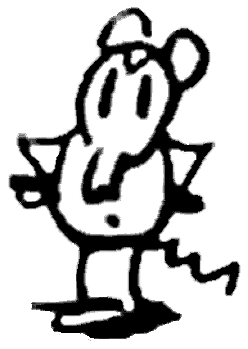
Ignatz Mouse as seen in the November 4, 1917 Sunday page.

Ignatz is driven to distraction by Krazy Kat's naïveté, and generally reacts by throwing bricks at Krazy's head. To shield his plans from Officer Pupp, Ignatz hides his bricks, disguises himself, or enlists the aid of willing Coconino County denizens (without making his intentions clear). Easing Ignatz's task is Krazy Kat's willingness to meet him anywhere at any appointed time, eager to receive a token of affection in the form of a brick to the head. Ignatz is married with three children, though they are rarely seen.

Ironically, although Ignatz seems to generally have contempt for Krazy, one strip shows his ancestor, Mark Antony Mouse, fall in love with Krazy's ancestor, an Egyptian cat princess (calling her his "Star of the Nile"), and pay a sculptor to carve a brick with a love message. When he throws it at her, he is arrested, but she announces her love for him, and from that day on, he throws bricks at her to show his love for her (which would explain why Krazy believes that Ignatz throwing bricks is a sign of love). In another strip, Krazy kisses a sleeping Ignatz, and hearts appear above the mouse's head.

In the last five (or so) years of the strip, Ignatz's feelings of animosity for Krazy were noticeably downplayed. While earlier, one got the sense of his taking advantage of Krazy's willingness to be "bricked", now one gets the sense of Ignatz and Krazy as chummy co-conspirators against Pupp, with Ignatz at times quite aware of the positive way Krazy interprets his missiles.

=== Officer Bull Pupp ===
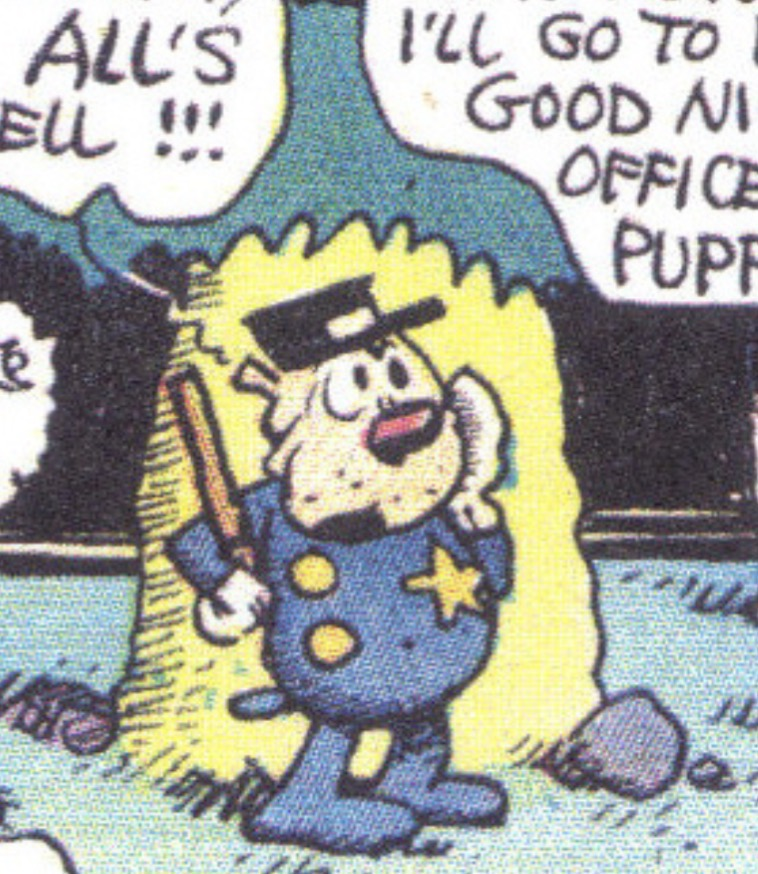
Officer Pupp as seen in the January 28, 1922 Sunday page.

A police dog who loves Krazy, and always tries (sometimes successfully) to thwart Ignatz's desires to pelt Krazy Kat with bricks. Officer Pupp and Ignatz often try to get the better of each other even when Krazy is not directly involved, as they both enjoy seeing the other played for a fool. He is a firm believer in justice and frequently describes his surroundings in the form of poetry.

=== Secondary characters ===
Beyond these three, Coconino County is populated with an assortment of incidental, recurring characters:

- Joe Stork: the "purveyor of progeny to prince & proletarian", often makes unwanted baby deliveries to various characters. In one strip, Ignatz tries to trick him into dropping a brick onto Krazy's head from above. The character debuted in Gooseberry Sprig as the titular character's "Prime Minister".
- Kolin Kelly: a dog, a brickmaker by trade who bakes his wares in a kiln. He is often unknowingly Ignatz's source for projectiles, although he distrusts the mouse.
- Mrs. Kwakk Wakk: a duck in a pillbox hat, a scold and busybody who frequently notices Ignatz in the course of his plotting and informs Officer Pupp. She is a social climber, attempting in one strip continuity to replace Pupp as police chief.

Other characters who make semi-frequent appearances are:

- Mimi: a French poodle schoolteacher who is the object of the residents' affection
- Walter Cephus Austridge: a nondescript ostrich
- Bum Bill Bee: a transient, bearded insect
- Don Kiyote: an inconsequential heterodox Mexican coyote
- Mock Duck: a clairvoyant fowl of Chinese descent who operates a cleaning establishment.
- Gooseberry Sprig: the Duck Duke, who briefly starred in his own strip before Krazy Kat was created.
- Also: Krazy's Aunt Tabby and Uncle Tom; and his aerial and aquatic cousins, respectively: Krazy Katbird and Krazy Katfish.
- Ignatz also has relations; his family of look-alike mice includes his frustrated wife, Mathilda and a trio of equally unruly sons named Milton, Marshall and Irving.

== History ==
First Krazy Kat strip, October 28, 1913

Krazy Kat evolved from an earlier comic strip of Herriman's, The Dingbat Family, which started in June 1910 and was later renamed The Family Upstairs. This comic chronicled the Dingbats' attempts to avoid the mischief of the mysterious unseen family living in the apartment above theirs and to unmask that family. Herriman would complete the daily comics about the Dingbats, and finding himself with time left over in his 8-hour work day, filled the bottom of the strip with slapstick drawings of the upstairs family's mouse preying upon the Dingbats' cat.

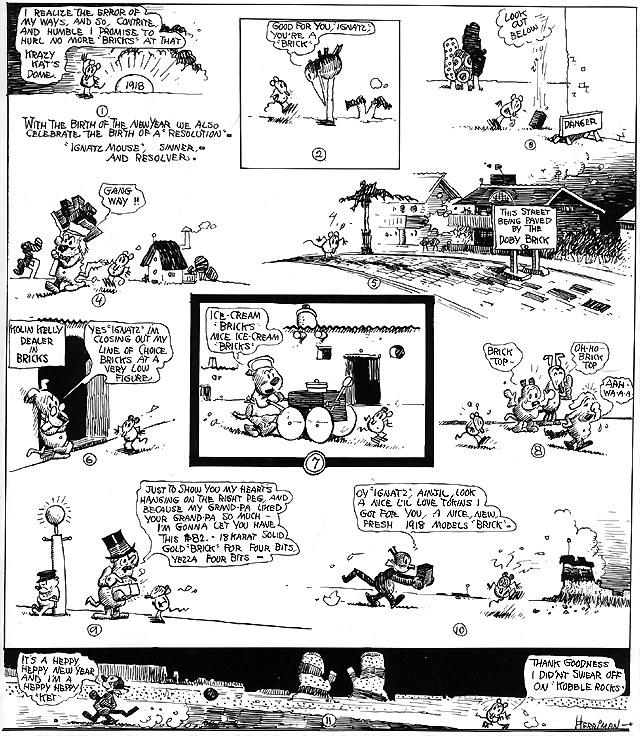
Ignatz Mouse resolves not to throw any more bricks at Krazy. Temptation follows him at every turn, and ultimately he finds a loophole to indulge his passion (January 6, 1918).

This "basement strip" grew into something much larger than the original cartoon. Krazy Kat first appeared as its own daily comic strip in 1911, and then again in the summer of 1912, although only temporarily at the time. It again became a daily comic strip (running vertically down the side of the page) in October 1913, and was thereafter to remain in syndication for more than thirty years. Most sources cite October 28, 1913 as the official debut date of the daily strip, however it may have appeared a few weeks prior in Hearst papers. A black and white, full-page Krazy Kat Sunday comic was launched on April 23, 1916. Possibly due to the objections of editors, who did not think it was suitable for the comics sections, Krazy Kat originally appeared in the Hearst papers' art and drama sections. It has been claimed that Hearst himself, however, enjoyed the strip so much that he gave Herriman a lifetime contract and guaranteed the cartoonist complete creative freedom, although according to Michael Tisserand's biography on Herriman (2016), there exists no proof that this alleged lifetime contract was ever made or signed.

Despite its relatively low popularity among the general public, Krazy Kat gained a wide following among intellectuals. In 1922, a jazz ballet based on the comic was produced and scored by John Alden Carpenter; though the performance played to sold-out crowds on two nights and was given positive reviews in The New York Times and The New Republic, it failed to boost the strip's popularity as Hearst had hoped. In addition to Seldes and Cummings, contemporary admirers of Krazy Kat included T. S. Eliot, Willem de Kooning, H. L. Mencken, P. G. Wodehouse, Jack Kerouac, Robert Benchley, Carl Sandburg, and artist Paul Nash. In 1931, Nash wrote that "no country has produced, in the narrow limits of this medium, a fantastic philosopher such as George Herriman". Reportedly, president Woodrow Wilson also read the strip regularly. More recent scholars and authors have seen the strip as reflecting the Dada movement and prefiguring postmodernism.

In the summer of 1934, the Krazy Kat Sunday page was temporarily shelved, although the daily strip continued as before. Beginning in June 1935, Krazy Kat's Sunday page returned, and was thereafter published in full color. Though the number of newspapers carrying it dwindled in its last decade, Herriman continued to draw Krazy Kat, creating roughly 3,000 comics in total, until his death in April 1944 (the final Sunday page was published exactly two months later, on June 25). Bob Naylor drew the Krazy Kat daily strips from February 21 to March 18, 1944 when Herriman was too ill to keep the strips on schedule for King Features Syndicate. Hearst promptly canceled the strip after the artist died, because, contrary to the common practice of the time, he did not want to see a new cartoonist take over.

=== Animated adaptations ===
The title card of this 1916 silent short read "Krazy Kat – Bugologist. A Cartoon by George Herriman. Animated by Frank Moser". Length 3m24s, 416 kbit/s

The comic strip was animated several times (see filmography below). The earliest Krazy Kat shorts were produced by Hearst, starting with the release of Introducing Krazy Kat and Ignatz Mouse in February 1916. More than 25 similar animated silent shorts were made until August 1917. They were produced under Hearst-Vitagraph News Pictorial and later the International Film Service (IFS), though Herriman was not involved.

In early 1920, after a two-year hiatus, the John R. Bray studio began producing a second series of Krazy Kat shorts. These cartoons hewed close to the comic strips, including Ignatz, Pupp and other standard supporting characters. Krazy's ambiguous gender and feelings for Ignatz were usually preserved; bricks were occasionally thrown. Bray Productions produced at least eleven such Krazy Kat shorts until February 1921, after which the series ended. With added sound effects and music, these (originally silent) cartoons were in periodic reissue also during the 1930s and 1940s, and ended up being syndicated to television in the 1950s.

In 1925, animation pioneer Bill Nolan decided to bring Krazy to the screen again. Nolan intended to produce the series under Associated Animators, but when it dissolved, he sought distribution from Margaret J. Winkler. Unlike earlier adaptations, Nolan did not base his shorts on the characters and setting of the Herriman comic strip. Instead, the feline in Nolan's cartoons was a male cat whose design and personality both reflected Felix the Cat. This is probably due to the fact that Nolan himself was a former employee of the Pat Sullivan studio. Other Herriman characters appeared in the Nolan cartoons at first, though similarly altered: Kwakk Wakk was at times Krazy's paramour, with Ignatz often the bully trying to break up the romance. Over time, Nolan's influence waned and new directors, Ben Harrison and Manny Gould, took over the series. By late 1927, they were solely in charge.

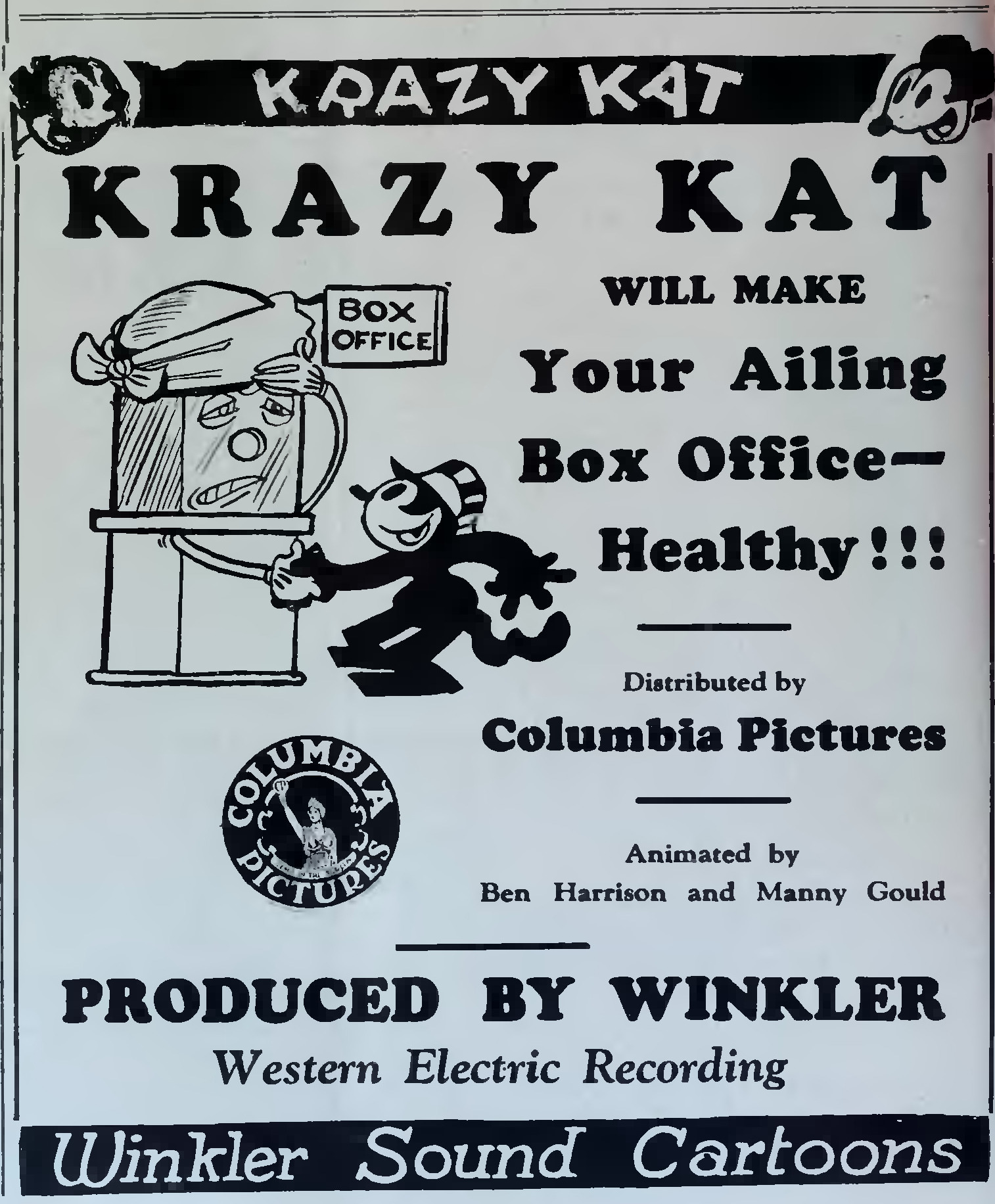
Ad from The Film Daily, 1929

Winkler's husband, Charles Mintz, slowly began assuming control of the operation. Mintz and his studio (later known as Screen Gems) began producing the cartoons in sound beginning with 1929's Ratskin. In 1931, he moved the staff to California and ultimately changed the design of Krazy Kat. The new character bore even less resemblance to the one in the newspapers. Mintz's Krazy Kat was, like many other early 1930s cartoon characters, imitative of Mickey Mouse, and usually engaged in slapstick comic adventures with his look-alike girlfriend and loyal pet dog; both series ironically share distributor Columbia Pictures before Walt Disney switched distributors to United Artists. In 1936, animator Isadore Klein, with the blessing of Mintz, set to work creating the short Lil' Ainjil, the only Mintz work that was intended to reflect Herriman's comic strip. However, Klein was "terribly disappointed" with the resulting cartoon, and the Mickey-derivative Krazy returned. In 1939, Mintz became indebted to Columbia Pictures, and subsequently sold his studio to them. The studio released its final Krazy Kat cartoon, The Mouse Exterminator, in January 1940 as part of their Phantasies series, which was also the last screen adaptation of Krazy Kat to be made during Herriman's lifetime. In the 1960s, some of the later shorts were colorized and released on Super 8mm film.

As had been the case with the animated Krazy Kat shorts of the silent era, Herriman was not involved in the making of the sound shorts of the 1930s.

King Features produced 50 Krazy Kat cartoons from 1962 to 1964, most of which were created at Gene Deitch's Rembrandt Films in Prague, Czechoslovakia (now the Czech Republic), whilst the rest were produced by Artransa Film Studios in Sydney, Australia. The cartoons were initially televised interspersed with Beetle Bailey (some of which were also produced by Artransa) and Snuffy Smith cartoons to form a half-hour TV show, The King Features Trilogy. These cartoons helped to introduce Herriman's cat to the baby boomers. 27 of these cartoons have been made available on DVD within the "Advantage Cartoon Mega Pack" set.

The King Features shorts of the 1960s were made for television and have a closer connection to the comic strip; the backgrounds are drawn in a similar style, Ignatz was present and once again the reluctant object of Krazy's affection. This incarnation of Krazy was made female; Penny Phillips voiced Krazy while Paul Frees voiced Ignatz. The recurring character Officer Bull Pupp also appeared often in this series, though his love of Krazy did not play a role in very many of the stories. Jay Livingston and Ray Evans did the music for most of the episodes. Most of the episodes are available on DVD.

=== Comic book adaptation ===
In 1951, Dell Publishing revived the characters for a run of comic books. All five issues were drawn by cartoonist John Stanley, best known for his Little Lulu comic books. While the general plot premise is reminiscent of Herriman's strip, the look and feel are entirely different: firmly in the visual and written style of 1950s talking animal strips for children. Krazy is male in this version of the strip while Ignatz is female. This "Krazy Kat" also made several one-shot appearances in Dell's Four Color Comics series, from 1953 through 1956 (#s 454, 504, 548, 619, 696) and was reprinted in some Gold Key and Page Comics over the next decade.

== Chronology of formats ==
The strip went through several format changes during its run, each of which impacted the artwork and the narratives that the form of the strip could accommodate. What follows are the landmarks, which can also help to date the era of a given strip.

- July 26, 1910: First "beaning" of Kat by Mouse at bottom of The Dingbat Family. Strip is not sectioned off, but a detail at the bottom of the panels. Strip as a whole tended to run 4 inches × 13 inches. Soon the Kat and Mouse were a five-panel 1½ inch strip at the bottom of the cartoon.
- 1911: First brief run of Krazy and I. Mouse standalone strips (probably as a replacement to The Family Upstairs). Also, the characters briefly take over the strip for a couple of periods in 1912 (at least once, while the Dingbats are "on holiday" in July 1912).
- October 28, 1913: Krazy Kat debuts as a five-panel daily vertical strip which runs down the side of a full comics page. This remains its daily format until sometime in 1920.
- April 23, 1916: First black and white full page Sunday strip.
- March 4 – October 30, 1920: The "Panoramic Dailies" period, where Herriman is allowed to experiment wildly in an unbroken daily horizontal 3 × 13 inch space.
- November 1920 on: Herriman is constrained to a more conventional daily horizontal format containing three equal split sections, with the center section further split in two. This allows the strip to be run full page, half page or a third of a page, according to editorial whim. From September 13 to October 15, 1921, Herriman regains some control (no split center section) and resumes the previous years' format experiments.
- January 7 – March 11, 1922: In the New York Journal, 10 weeks of Saturday full-page color strips, in addition to the ongoing Sunday full page black-and-white strips (in other words, two original full-page strips every week). This is then canceled due to its lack of noticeable commercial success, compared to the new Saturday color sections in out-of-town Hearst papers which contained no Krazy Kat.
- August 1925 to September 1929: Sundays are confined to 3-row, split-middle-line format allowing some papers to reduce cartoon's size and reformat into two daily-sized rows.
- Summer 1934: Full page Sunday strips cease entirely, for roughly a year.
- June 1, 1935: Full page Sunday strips resume, now in color, until Herriman's death.
- December 11, 1938: "Optional" horizontal panel begins running on bottom of Sunday strips, as placeholder for potential advertising.
- June 3, 1944: Final daily strip published.
- June 25, 1944: Final Sunday strip published.

== Legacy ==
In 1934, in the live-action film Babes in Toyland, starring Stan Laurel and Oliver Hardy, the cat playing the fiddle (Peter Gordon) is repeatedly hit in the head with a brick by a mouse (a capuchin monkey) resembling Mickey Mouse.

In 1974, the OrlandoCon comics convention ("O'Con") introduced the Ignatz Award, a gold brick presented to the show's guest of honor. Recipients of the O'Con Ignatz included Don Martin, Ralph Kent, Joe Kubert, Martin Nodell, Don Addis, Burne Hogarth, and Dik Browne. This tradition continued until O'Con's demise in 1994. Soon after, beginning in 1997, the Small Press Expo (SPX) began distributing their own Ignatz Award bricks to the winners of various annual awards. During his tenure as SPX Ignatz Award administrator, Jeff Alexander drew a strip for the annual award program in Herriman's style.

In 1984, Cyndi Lauper paid homage to Krazy Kat in her song "Yeah Yeah", overdubbing the phrase in Krazy Kat's vocal style — "Ignatz, I love you" — during the second verse.

In 1994, in the live-action film Pulp Fiction, starring John Travolta and Samuel L. Jackson; Krazy Kat, Ignatz Mouse, and Officer Pupp make an appearance, printed on a pale blue T-shirt worn by Jackson's character Jules, who had to hastily change his clothes after an accidental shooting in a car.

In 1995, the strip was one of 20 included in the Comic Strip Classics series of commemorative U.S. postage stamps.

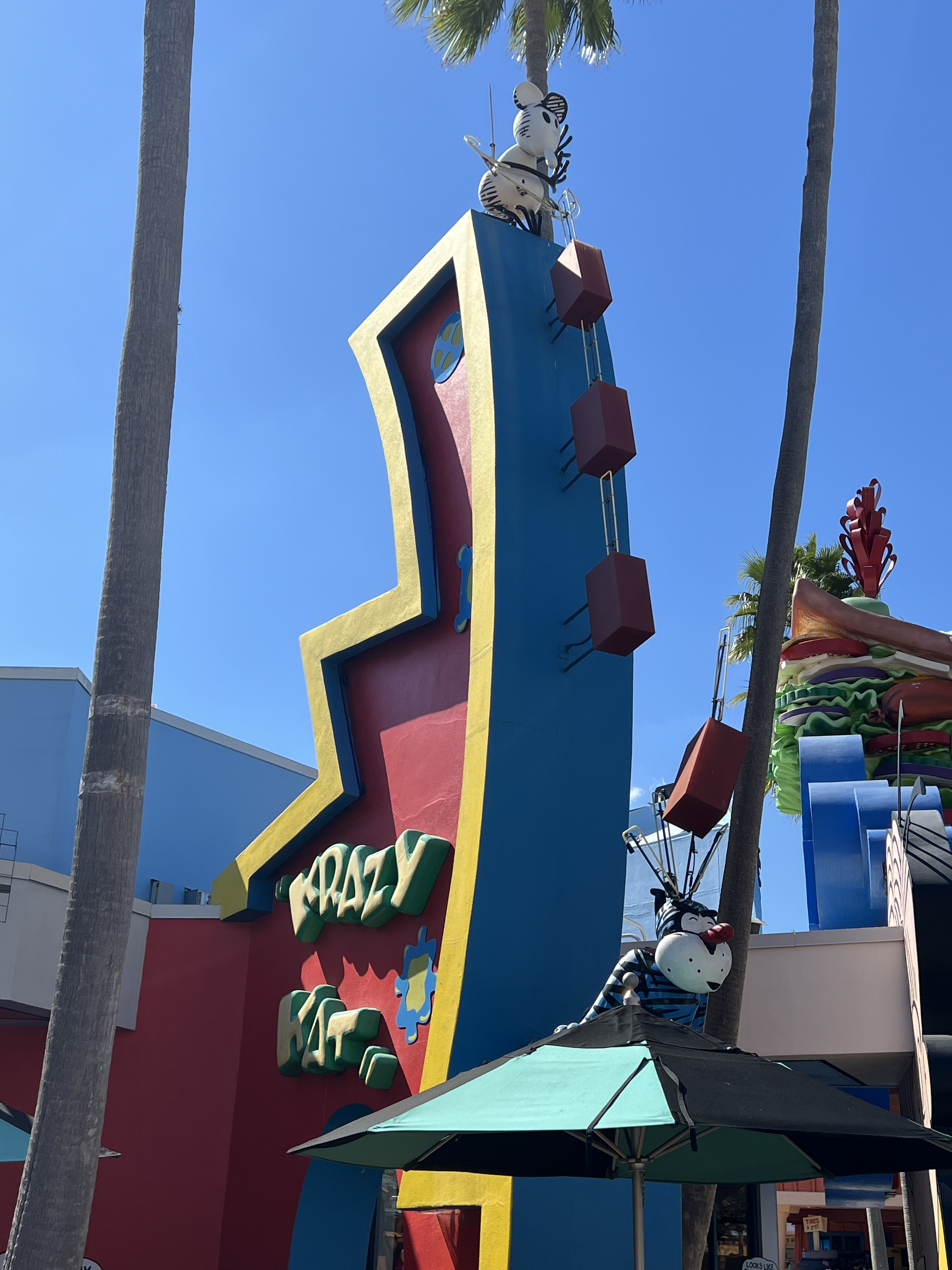
A statue at Universal Islands of Adventure depicting Ignatz Mouse and Krazy Kat.

In 1999, Universal Islands of Adventure opened to the public. The park's Toon Lagoon area, themed to classic comics and cartoons, features a statue of Ignatz Mouse dropping a brick onto Krazy Kat's head. Also in 1999, Krazy Kat was rated #1 in a Comics Journal list of the best American comics of the 20th century; the list included both comic books and comic strips.

In 2004, a picture of Krazy Kat appeared on the wall of the Goofy Goober bar in The SpongeBob SquarePants Movie, alongside a picture of Popeye.

Krazy Kat continues to inspire artists and cartoonists. Chuck Jones's Wile E. Coyote and Road Runner shorts, set in a similar visual pastiche of the American Southwest, are among the most famous cartoons to draw upon Herriman's work. Patrick McDonnell, creator of the current strip Mutts and co-author of Krazy Kat: The Comic Art of George Herriman, cites it as his "foremost influence". Bill Watterson of Calvin and Hobbes fame named Krazy Kat among his three major influences (along with Peanuts and Pogo). Watterson would revive Herriman's practice of employing varied, unpredictable panel layouts in his Sunday strips. Charles M. Schulz and Will Eisner both said that they were drawn towards cartooning partly because of the impact Krazy Kat made on them in their formative years. Bobby London's Dirty Duck was styled after Krazy Kat.

Jules Feiffer, Philip Guston, and Hunt Emerson have all had Krazy Kat's imprint recognized in their work. Larry Gonick's comic strip Kokopelli & Company is set in "Kokonino County", an homage to Herriman's exotic locale. Chris Ware admires the strip, and his frequent publisher, Fantagraphics, is currently reissuing its entire run in volumes designed by Ware (which also include reproductions of Herriman miscellanea, some of it donated by Ware). In the 1980s, Sam Hurt's syndicated strip Eyebeam showed a clear Herriman influence, particularly in its continually morphing backgrounds.

Among non-cartoonists, Jay Cantor's 1987 novel Krazy Kat uses Herriman's characters to analyze humanity's reaction to nuclear weapons, Russell Hoban's novel The Medusa Frequency (also 1987) uses a quote from the cartoon in an epigraph ("ZIP... POW... LOVES ME") while Michael Stipe of the rock band R.E.M. has a tattoo of Krazy and Ignatz.

In the Garfield TV special Garfield: His 9 Lives, Garfield plays a stunt double for Krazy Kat. In one 1989 Bloom County strip by Berkeley Breathed, Krazy and Ignatz can be seen watching Binkley, Oliver, and Opus float through a Herriman-esque landscape; and in a couple of 9 Chickweed Lane strips, Krazy and Ignatz are referred to in regards to a printed training bra once worn by Edda during her preteen years.

Throughout 2000 to 2003, Dark Horse Comics, in association with Yoe! Studio produced various officially licensed Krazy Kat collectibles.

A road in Tucson, Arizona is named S Crazy Cat Lane, which is possibly named after Herriman's strip.

== Reprints and compilations ==
For many decades, only a small percentage of Herriman's strip was available in reprinted form. The first Krazy Kat collection, published by Henry Holt and Company in 1946, just two years after Herriman's death, gathered 200 selected strips. In Europe, the cartoons were first reprinted in 1965 by the Italian magazine Linus, and appeared in the pages of the French monthly Charlie Mensuel starting in 1970. In 1969, Grosset & Dunlap produced a single hardcover collection of selected episodes and sequences spanning the entire length of the strip's run. The Netherlands' Real Free Press published five issues of Krazy Kat Komix in 1974–1976, containing a few hundred strips apiece; each of the issues' covers was designed by Joost Swarte. However, owing to the difficulty of tracking down high-quality copies of the original newspapers, no plans for a comprehensive collection of Krazy Kat strips surfaced until the 1980s.

All of the Sunday strips from 1916 to 1924 were reprinted by Eclipse Comics in cooperation with Turtle Island Press. Beginning in 1988, the intent was to eventually reprint every Sunday Krazy Kat, but this planned series was aborted when Eclipse ceased business in 1992. Beginning in 2002, Fantagraphics resumed reprinting Sunday Krazy Kats where Eclipse left off; in 2008, their tenth release completed the run with 1944. Fantagraphics then reissued, in the same format, the strips previously printed in Eclipse's now out-of-print volumes. Both the Eclipse and Fantagraphics reprints include additional rarities such as older George Herriman cartoons predating Krazy Kat.

In 1990, Kitchen Sink Press, in association with Remco Worldservice Books, reprinted two volumes of color Sunday strips dating from 1935 to 1937, but like Eclipse, they collapsed before they could continue the series. The 3-D Zone #5, published by The 3-D Zone in June 1987, features reprints of Krazy Kat strips converted into 3-D, and includes two pairs of red/blue 3-D glasses.

The daily strips for 1921 to 1923 were reprinted by Pacific Comics Club, in two series of different sizes. Comics Revue published all of the daily strips from September 8, 1930 through December 31, 1934. In 2007, Fantagraphics offered a one-shot reprint of daily strips from 1910s and 1920s, and plans a more complete reprinting of the daily strip in the future.

Scattered Sundays and dailies have appeared in several collections, including the Grosset & Dunlap book reprinted by Nostalgia Press, but the most readily available sampling of Sundays and dailies from throughout the strip's run is Krazy Kat: The Comic Art of George Herriman, published by Harry N. Abrams, Inc. in 1986. It includes a detailed biography of Herriman and was, for a long time, the only in-print book to republish Krazy Kat strips from after 1940. Although it contains over 200 strips, including many color Sundays, it is light on material from 1923 to 1937. Small selections of dailies appear in literary anthologies published by The Green Bag.

=== Henry Holt & Co. ===
- Krazy Kat (1946): Introduction by E.E. Cummings. Hardcover B&W compilation of daily and Sunday strips, concentrating on 1930–1944.

Contents of book:
Page	Date	Daily/Sunday	Notes
1946-001	1943-04-03	daily	
1946-002a	1941-03-18	daily	
1946-002b	1941-03-20	daily	
1946-002c	1941-03-21	daily	
1946-002d	1941-03-22	daily	
1946-003		daily	11/17/192x?
1946-004	1936-03-15	Sunday	
1946-005	1921-07-10	Sunday	
1946-006			intro text only
1946-007	1930-11-06	daily	
1946-008	1941-12-06	daily	
1946-009	1933-11-12	Sunday	
1946-010	1937-06-13	Sunday	
1946-011	1937-06-06	Sunday	
1946-012	1941-11-23	Sunday	
1946-013	1943-05-02	Sunday	
1946-014	1942-07-26	Sunday	
1946-015	1936-10-25	Sunday	
1946-016	1942-05-10	Sunday	
1946-017a	1942-04-21	daily	
1946-017b	1942-04-22	daily	
1946-017c	1942-04-23	daily	
1946-017d	1942-04-24	daily	
1946-018a	1942-04-25	daily	
1946-018b	1943-09-02	daily	
1946-018c	1942-11-14	daily	
1946-018d		daily	coco/mulb tree
1946-019	1944-01-30	Sunday	
1946-020	1944-02-06	Sunday	
1946-021	1943-07-04	Sunday	
1946-022	1942-04-05	Sunday	
1946-023	1934-05-20	Sunday	
1946-024	1941-06-01	Sunday	
1946-025	1941-04-27	Sunday	
1946-026	1943-09-19	Sunday	
1946-027	1943-11-14	Sunday	
1946-028	1942-06-21	Sunday	
1946-029a	1943-03-03	daily	
1946-029b		daily	?/?/1931?
1946-029c	1934-11-12	daily	
1946-029d	1934-11-13	daily	
1946-030	1943-11-21	Sunday	
1946-031	1942-12-20	Sunday	
1946-032a	1936-07-06	daily	start 1946 Tiger Tea excerpt
1946-032b	1936-07-08	daily	Tiger Tea
1946-032c	1936-07-09	daily	Tiger Tea
1946-032d	1936-07-10	daily	Tiger Tea
1946-033a	1936-07-11	daily	Tiger Tea
1946-033b	1936-07-27	daily	Tiger Tea
1946-033c	1936-07-29	daily	Tiger Tea
1946-033d	1936-09-26	daily	Tiger Tea
1946-034a	1937-03-10	daily	Tiger Tea
1946-034b	1936-08-19	daily	Tiger Tea
1946-034c	1937-03-11	daily	Tiger Tea
1946-034d	1937-03-17	daily	end 1946 Tiger Tea excerpt
1946-035	1938-03-27	Sunday	
1946-036	1939-01-01	Sunday	
1946-037	1940-12-08	Sunday	
1946-038	1937-06-20	Sunday	
1946-039	1944-03-05	Sunday	
1946-040a	1943-08-11	daily	
1946-040b	1932-03-09	daily	
1946-040c	1942-02-11	daily	
1946-040d	1942-02-12	daily	
1946-041	1942-02-22	Sunday	
1946-042	1944-05-14	Sunday	
1946-043	1943-05-09	Sunday	
1946-044	1936-11-22	Sunday	
1946-045	1942-04-19	Sunday	
1946-046	1936-07-26	Sunday	
1946-047	1935-07-07	Sunday	
1946-048a	1930-07-17	daily	start Kuku Kat excerpt
1946-048b	1930-07-19	daily	Kuku Kat
1946-048c	1930-06-18	daily	Kuku Kat
1946-048d	1930-06-21	daily	Kuku Kat
1946-049a	1930-07-21	daily	Kuku Kat
1946-049b	1930-07-02	daily	Kuku Kat
1946-049c	1930-06-19	daily	Kuku Kat
1946-049d	1930-06-26	daily	Kuku Kat
1946-050a		daily	?/?/1923?
1946-050b	1930-08-11	daily	Kuku Kat
1946-050c	1930-08-18	daily	Kuku Kat
1946-050d	1930-08-23	daily	Kuku Kat
1946-051a	1930-07-04	daily	Kuku Kat
1946-051b	1930-08-06	daily	Kuku Kat
1946-051c	1930-10-10	daily	Kuku Kat
1946-051d	1930-10-11	daily	Kuku Kat
1946-052a	1930-10-14	daily	Kuku Kat
1946-052b	1930-10-15	daily	Kuku Kat
1946-052c	1930-10-17	daily	Kuku Kat
1946-052d	1930-10-18	daily	end Kuku Kat excerpt
1946-053	1933-06-25	Sunday	
1946-054	1933-10-01	Sunday	
1946-055	1941-03-23	Sunday	
1946-056	1919-11-02	Sunday	
1946-057	1921-07-24	Sunday	
1946-058a	1932-10-10	daily	
1946-058b	1932-10-11	daily	
1946-058c	1932-10-15	daily	
1946-058d	1932-10-28	daily	
1946-059	1922-06-11	Sunday	
1946-060a	1942-10-09	daily	
1946-060b	1931-03-19	daily	
1946-060c	1931-06-08	daily	?year
1946-060d	1934-07-24	daily	
1946-061	1941-08-24	Sunday	
1946-062	1921-09-11	Sunday	
1946-063	1938-04-24	Sunday	
1946-064	1943-08-01	Sunday	
1946-065a	1933-08-23	daily	
1946-065b	1932-06-16	daily	
1946-065c	1932-06-18	daily	
1946-065d	1932-06-14	daily	
1946-066	1943-06-20	Sunday	
1946-067	1933-07-16	Sunday	
1946-068	1940-07-28	Sunday	
1946-069	1940-07-07	Sunday	
1946-070a	1940-04-24	daily	
1946-070b	1940-06-27	daily	
1946-070c	1940-06-25	daily	
1946-070d	1940-07-03	daily	
1946-071	1940-07-21	Sunday	
1946-072a	1940-06-29	daily	
1946-072b	1940-03-15	daily	
1946-072c	1941-01-18	daily	
1946-072d	1940-04-26	daily	
1946-073	1940-08-11	Sunday	
1946-074	1940-08-04	daily	
1946-075	1937-09-26	Sunday	
1946-076a	1932-07-08	daily	
1946-076b		daily	2/10/19xx?
1946-076c		daily	?/?/1941
1946-076d	1941-09-10	daily	
1946-077	1937-05-02	Sunday	
1946-078	1921-05-08	Sunday	
1946-079	1933-02-05	Sunday	
1946-080a	1932-06-04	daily	
1946-080b	1941-07-30	daily	
1946-080c	1939-12-11	daily	
1946-080d	1943-12-20	daily	
1946-081	1938-08-14	Sunday	
1946-082	1937-12-26	Sunday	
1946-083a	1932-01-19	daily	?date
1946-083b	1932-01-20	daily	Manx cats
1946-083c	1932-01-21	daily	Manx cats
1946-083d	1932-01-22	daily	Manx cats
1946-084a	1932-01-23	daily	Manx cats
1946-084b	1932-01-27	daily	Manx cats
1946-084c	1932-01-28	daily	Manx cats
1946-084d	1932-01-29	daily	Manx cats
1946-085a	1932-01-30	daily	Manx cats
1946-085b	1932-02-04	daily	Manx cats
1946-085c	1932-02-01	daily	Manx cats
1946-085d	1932-02-06	daily	Manx cats
1946-086	1942-03-22	Sunday	
1946-087	1941-07-27	Sunday	
1946-088	1939-12-03	Sunday	
1946-089	1943-10-03	Sunday	
1946-090	1937-04-11	Sunday	
1946-091	1939-07-09	Sunday	
1946-092a	1941-04-21	daily	
1946-092b	1941-04-22	daily	
1946-092c	1941-04-25	daily	
1946-092d	1941-04-26	daily	
1946-093	1944-03-26	Sunday	
1946-094	1936-11-01	Sunday	
1946-095	1943-01-03	Sunday	poss misdated as 1/2
1946-096a	1932-08-30	daily	Uncle Tom Kat excerpt
1946-096b	1932-08-23	daily	Uncle Tom Kat
1946-096c	1932-08-25	daily	Uncle Tom Kat
1946-096d	1932-08-31	daily	Uncle Tom Kat
1946-097a	1932-10-04	daily	Uncle Tom Kat
1946-097b	1932-09-05	daily	Uncle Tom Kat
1946-097c	1932-09-07	daily	Uncle Tom Kat
1946-097d	1932-06-28	daily	Uncle Tom Kat
1946-098a	1932-09-16	daily	Uncle Tom Kat
1946-098b	1932-09-29	daily	Uncle Tom Kat
1946-098c	1932-09-30	daily	Uncle Tom Kat
1946-098d	1932-09-24	daily	Uncle Tom Kat
1946-099a	1932-09-12	daily	Uncle Tom Kat
1946-099b	1932-09-20	daily	Uncle Tom Kat
1946-099c	1932-09-21	daily	Uncle Tom Kat
1946-099d	1932-09-22	daily	Uncle Tom Kat
1946-100a	1932-09-12	daily	repeats from p99a
1946-100b	1932-09-14	daily	Uncle Tom Kat
1946-100c	1932-09-15	daily	Uncle Tom Kat
1946-100d	1932-09-28	daily	end Uncle Tom Kat excerpt
1946-101	1941-09-28	Sunday	
1946-102	1942-05-31	Sunday	
1946-103	1944-05-07	Sunday	
1946-104	1941-12-07	Sunday	
1946-105	1941-03-16	Sunday	
1946-106a	1942-04-01	daily	
1946-106b		daily	3/29/19xx?
1946-106c	1931-07-16	daily	
1946-106d		daily	5/2/19xx?
1946-107	1933-12-10	Sunday	
1946-108	1920-05-09	Sunday	
1946-109	1933-02-19	Sunday	
1946-110a	1932-03-23	daily	
1946-110b	1931-06-01	daily	
1946-110c	1931-06-02	daily	
1946-110d	1931-06-04	daily	
1946-111	1919-08-17	Sunday	
1946-112	1919-09-21	Sunday	
1946-113	1933-05-28	Sunday	
1946-114	1936-01-26	Sunday	
1946-115a	1931-10-15	daily	?year
1946-115b	1931-02-21	daily	
1946-115c		daily	3/18/193x?; not 31
1946-115d	1935-10-28	daily	
1946-116	1933-03-12	Sunday	
1946-117	1942-01-25	Sunday	
1946-118	1942-08-30	Sunday	
1946-119	1937-04-04	Sunday	
1946-120a	1932-06-21	daily	
1946-120b	1932-05-27	daily	
1946-120c	1932-06-22	daily	
1946-120d	1931-10-26	daily	
1946-121	1936-08-01	Sunday	
1946-122	1942-07-05	Sunday	
1946-123	1935-11-03	Sunday	
1946-124	1937-03-07	Sunday	
1946-125	1939-07-02	Sunday	
1946-126	1937-10-24	Sunday	
1946-127	1941-12-28	Sunday	
1946-128	1944-02-27	Sunday	
1946-129	1941-01-12	Sunday	
1946-130a	1944-04-27	daily	
1946-130b	1943-11-15	daily	
1946-130c	1943-11-18	daily	only 3 dailies on page
1946-131	1944-02-20	Sunday	
1946-132	1940-05-19	Sunday	
1946-133	1937-01-31	Sunday	
1946-134	1943-10-10	Sunday	
1946-135	1938-08-28	Sunday	
1946-136	1938-04-17	Sunday	
1946-137	1944-04-02	Sunday	
1946-138	1941-05-04	Sunday	
1946-139a		daily	3/14/193x?
1946-139b	1935-12-11	daily	
1946-139c	1932-12-19	daily	
1946-139d		daily	4/2/19xx?
1946-140	1942-09-27	Sunday	
1946-141	1939-11-12	Sunday	
1946-142a	1941-12-16	daily	
1946-142b	1941-12-17	daily	
1946-142c	1943-07-27	daily	
1946-142d	1941-03-31	daily	
1946-143	1944-03-19	Sunday	
1946-144	1938-12-18	Sunday	
1946-145	1940-02-25	Sunday	
1946-146	1942-08-23	Sunday	
1946-147	1943-09-26	Sunday	
1946-148	1939-02-26	Sunday	
1946-149	1943-06-27	Sunday	
1946-150a	1932-11-21	daily	
1946-150b	1932-11-25	daily	
1946-150c	1932-11-24	daily	
1946-150d	1931-03-13	daily	
1946-151	1937-05-16	Sunday	
1946-152	1942-07-12	Sunday	
1946-153	1940-03-10	Sunday	
1946-154a	1938-12-12	daily	
1946-154b		daily	7/9/19xx?
1946-154c	1941-12-02	daily	
1946-154d		daily	2/12/19xx?
1946-155	1934-08-05	Sunday	
1946-156	1917-06-17	Sunday	
1946-157	1941-07-13	Sunday	
1946-158	1934-01-28	Sunday	
1946-159a	1939-06-20	daily	
1946-159b	1932-07-11	daily	
1946-159c	1931-11-04	daily	
1946-159d	1931-10-29	daily	
1946-160	1940-01-28	Sunday	
1946-161	1943-01-17	Sunday	
1946-162	1936-07-05	Sunday	
1946-163	1940-03-17	Sunday	
1946-164a	1930-05-02	daily	
1946-164b	1933-09-01	daily	
1946-164c	1935-02-23	daily	?year
1946-164d	1932-04-11	daily	
1946-165	1922-11-05	Sunday	
1946-166	1918-08-18	Sunday	
1946-167	1938-02-06	Sunday	
1946-168	1943-03-07	Sunday	
1946-169	1942-09-06	Sunday	
1946-170	1943-10-24	Sunday	
1946-171a	1943-09-29	daily	
1946-171b	1943-06-07	daily	
1946-171c	1943-06-15	daily	
1946-171d	1943-03-05	daily	
1946-172	1941-11-02	Sunday	
1946-173	1944-03-12	Sunday	
1946-174	1944-01-23	Sunday	
1946-175	1936-12-27	Sunday	
1946-176	1943-12-31	Sunday	strip dated 31st
1946-177a	1932-04-13	daily	
1946-177b	1932-03-21	daily	
1946-177c	1932-03-25	daily	
1946-177d	1933-09-02	daily	
1946-178	1941-11-30	Sunday	
1946-179	1942-11-22	Sunday	
1946-180	1943-08-22	Sunday	
1946-181	1939-10-22	Sunday	
1946-182	1943-12-05	Sunday	
1946-183	1940-05-12	Sunday	
1946-184	1938-04-03	Sunday	
1946-185	1936-12-13	Sunday	

=== Grosset & Dunlap/Nostalgia Press/Madison Square Press ===
- Krazy Kat: A Classic from the Golden Age of Comics (1969, 1975): An entirely different compilation of dailies and Sundays, with examples from the entire run of the strip—including 23 The Dingbat Family bottom strips. Reprints the e.e. cummings introduction from the Henry Holt volume. 8 pages in full color; some later editions have daily strips reproduced in blue ink. ISBN 0-448-11945-5 (hardcover), ISBN 0-448-11951-X (paperback)

Contents of book:
Page	Date	Daily/Sunday	Notes
1969-006-7	1941-11-23	Sunday	
1969-008-016			cummings introduction
1969-018-021		daily	several Dingbats w/ Krazy under
1969-022-032		daily	21, from under Dingbats, 1911–12
1969-034	1919-11-16	Sunday	
1969-035	1920-02-15	Sunday	repeat of 11/16/19
1969-036-7	1919-07-27	Sunday	
1969-038-9	1920-05-30	Sunday	
1969-040-1	1916-09-24	Sunday	
1969-042-3	1922-06-18	Sunday	
1969-044-5	1919-12-28	Sunday	
1969-046-7	1919-12-07	Sunday	
1969-048	1928-01-15	Sunday	
1969-050a		daily	1/30/193x?
1969-050b		daily	5/19/194x?
1969-050c		daily	1/31/193x?
1969-050d		daily	5/20/194x?
1969-051a	1940-05-27	daily	
1969-051b	1940-08-19	daily	
1969-051c	1940-08-20	daily	
1969-051d		daily	4/20/19xx?
1969-052a		daily	2/25/192x?
1969-052b		daily	2/27/192x?
1969-053a		daily	2/28/192x?
1969-053b		daily	seq w/ above 3
1969-054a		daily	3/9/193x?
1969-054b		daily	3/10/193x?
1969-054c		daily	3/11/193x?
1969-054d		daily	3/12/193x?
1969-055	1935-02-24	daily	
1969-056	1927-01-16	daily	
1969-057a	1938-08-15	daily	
1969-057b	1938-08-16	daily	
1969-057c	1938-08-17	daily	
1969-057d	1938-08-18	daily	
1969-058a		daily	8/19/193x?
1969-058b		daily	8/20/193x?
1969-058c		daily	5/2/193x?
1969-058d		daily	5/3/193x?
1969-059a	1943-03-08	daily	
1969-059b	1943-03-09	daily	
1969-059c	1943-03-10	daily	
1969-059d		daily	2/28/193x?
1969-060a	1935-09-11	daily	
1969-060b	1935-09-13	daily	
1969-060c 1969-060c	1935-09-14	daily	
1969-060d	1935-09-16	daily	
1969-061	1921-05-08	Sunday	
1969-062	1930-12-14	Sunday	
1969-063a		daily	7/17/194x?
1969-063b		daily	2/2/193x?
1969-063c		daily	1/23/193x?
1969-063d		daily	1/26/193x?
1969-064a		daily	2/1/193x?
1969-064b	1943-03-02	daily	
1969-064c	1942-08-15	daily	
1969-064d	1943-11-09	daily	
1969-065a		daily	10/23/193x?
1969-065b		daily	10/7/193x?
1969-065c		daily	10/11/193x?
1969-065d		daily	10/24/193x?
1969-066a		daily	10/25/193x?
1969-066b		daily	10/26/193x?
1969-066c		daily	10/27/193x?
1969-066d		daily	10/28/193x?
1969-067	1944-06-04		
1969-068	1937-10-17		
1969-069a		daily	7/29/193x?
1969-069b		daily	10/14/193x?
1969-069c		daily	10/11/193x?
1969-069d		daily	10/9/193x?
1969-070a		daily	9/1/193x?
1969-070b		daily	1/17/193x?
1969-070c		daily	9/29/193x?
1969-070d		daily	9/30/193x?
1969-071a		daily	7/11/193x?
1969-071b		daily	7/12/193x?
1969-071c		daily	7/13/193x?
1969-071d		daily	7/16/193x?
1969-072	1925-05-03	Sunday	
1969-073a		daily	3/25/193x?
1969-073b		daily	3/26/193x?
1969-073c		daily	3/27/193x?
1969-073d		daily	3/28/193x?
1969-074a	1940-08-21	daily	?year
1969-074b		daily	8/1/1940?
1969-074c		daily	7/23/1940?
1969-074d	1940-08-22	daily	
1969-075a		daily	12/11/193x?
1969-075b		daily	3/26/1933x?
1969-075c		daily	5/15/193x?
1969-075d		daily	9/21/193x?
1969-076		Sunday	6/24/1934? Poss misdated
1969-077	1933-05-28	Sunday	
1969-078a	1941-04-09	daily	
1969-078b	1941-04-10	daily	
1969-078c		daily	5/19/193x?
1969-078d		daily	5/20/193x?
1969-079a	1941-02-01	daily	
1969-079b		daily	6/5/193x?
1969-079c		daily	2/20/193x?
1969-079d		daily	7/6/194x?
1969-080	1937-08-08	Sunday	
1969-082	1933-11-12	Sunday	color section
1969-083	1938-09-25	Sunday	color section
1969-084	1939-06-11	Sunday	color section
1969-085	1916-09-03	Sunday	color section
1969-086	1919-09-07	Sunday	color section
1969-087	1942-01-18	Sunday	color section
1969-088	1917-12-30	Sunday	color section
1969-090a	1936-06-01	daily	
1969-090b	1936-06-02	daily	start 1969 Tiger Tea excerpt
1969-090c	1936-06-12	daily	Tiger Tea
1969-091a	1936-06-13	daily	Tiger Tea
1969-091b	1936-06-15	daily	Tiger Tea
1969-091c	1936-06-16	daily	Tiger Tea
1969-092a	1936-06-17	daily	Tiger Tea
1969-092b	1936-06-18	daily	Tiger Tea
1969-092c	1936-06-19	daily	Tiger Tea
1969-093a	1936-06-20	daily	Tiger Tea
1969-093b	1936-06-22	daily	Tiger Tea
1969-093c	1936-06-23	daily	Tiger Tea
1969-094a	1936-06-24	daily	Tiger Tea
1969-094b	1936-06-25	daily	Tiger Tea
1969-094c	1936-06-26	daily	Tiger Tea
1969-095a	1936-06-27	daily	Tiger Tea
1969-095b	1936-06-29	daily	Tiger Tea
1969-095c	1936-06-30	daily	Tiger Tea
1969-096a	1936-07-01	daily	Tiger Tea
1969-096b	1936-07-02	daily	Tiger Tea
1969-096c	1936-07-27	daily	Tiger Tea
1969-097a	1936-07-28	daily	Tiger Tea
1969-097b	1936-07-29	daily	Tiger Tea
1969-097c	1936-09-14	daily	Tiger Tea
1969-098a	1936-09-15	daily	Tiger Tea
1969-098a	1936-09-15	daily	Tiger Tea
1969-098b	1937-02-22	daily	Tiger Tea
1969-098c	1937-02-23	daily	Tiger Tea
1969-099a	1937-02-24	daily	Tiger Tea
1969-099b	1937-02-25	daily	Tiger Tea
1969-099c	1937-02-26	daily	Tiger Tea
1969-100a	1937-02-27	daily	Tiger Tea
1969-100b	1936-12-07	daily	Tiger Tea
1969-100c	1936-12-05	daily	Tiger Tea
1969-100c	1936-12-05	daily	Tiger Tea
1969-101a	1936-12-14	daily	Tiger Tea
1969-101b	1936-12-15	daily	Tiger Tea
1969-101c	1936-12-16	daily	Tiger Tea
1969-102a	1936-12-17	daily	Tiger Tea
1969-102b	1936-12-18	daily	Tiger Tea
1969-102c	1936-12-19	daily	Tiger Tea
1969-103a	1936-12-21	daily	Tiger Tea
1969-103b	1936-12-22	daily	Tiger Tea
1969-103c	1936-12-23	daily	Tiger Tea
1969-104a	1936-12-24	daily	Tiger Tea
1969-104b	1936-12-25	daily	Tiger Tea
1969-104c	1936-12-26	daily	end 1969 Tiger Tea excerpt
1969-106	1931-01-18	Sunday	repeat of 1/28/1923
1969-107a	1935-12-02	daily	?year
1969-107b	1935-12-03	daily	?year
1969-107c	1935-12-04	daily	?year
1969-107d	1935-12-05	daily	?year
1969-108a	1936-02-04	daily	
1969-108b	1936-02-05	daily	
1969-108c	1936-02-07	daily	
1969-108d	1936-02-08	daily	
1969-109	1919-06-29	Sunday	
1969-110		Sunday	Kat phone antics
1969-111a	1943-09-23	daily	?year
1969-111b		daily	9/14/194x?
1969-111c	1942-01-09	daily	
1969-111d		daily	11/2/194x?
1969-112a	1938-01-29	daily	
1969-112b		daily	7/28/19xx?
1969-112c		daily	3/9/193x?
1969-112d	1938-07-27	daily	
1969-113	1933-02-19	Sunday	
1969-114	1932-01-10	Sunday	
1969-115a	1943-06-14	daily	
1969-115b	1943-06-15	daily	
1969-115c	1943-06-16	daily	
1969-115d	1943-06-19	daily	
1969-116a		daily	1/6/193x?
1969-116b		daily	1/7/193x?
1969-116c		daily	1/4/193x?
1969-116d		daily	1/5/193x?
1969-117a	1927-04-26	daily	
1969-117b	1926-11-22	daily	
1969-118a	1940-10-04	daily	
1969-118b	1937-05-21	daily	
1969-118c	1937-05-22	daily	
1969-118d	1940-10-05	daily	
1969-119a	1926-05-26	daily	
1969-119b	1926-09-30	daily	
1969-120	1933-04-09	Sunday	
1969-122a	1937-12-20	daily	
1969-122b	1937-12-21	daily	
1969-122c	1937-12-22	daily	
1969-122d	1937-12-23	daily	
1969-123	1922-10-15	Sunday	
1969-124	1942-08-02	Sunday	
1969-125a	1943-05-17	daily	
1969-125b	1943-05-18	daily	
1969-125c	1942-07-31	daily	
1969-125d	1943-05-19	daily	
1969-126a	1936-01-20	daily	
1969-126b	1936-01-21	daily	
1969-126c	1936-01-22	daily	
1969-126d	1936-01-23	daily	
1969-127a	1943-05-05	daily	
1969-127b	1943-05-06	daily	
1969-127c	1943-05-07	daily	
1969-127d	1943-05-08	daily	
1969-128	1920-03-14	Sunday	
1969-129a	1942-05-11	daily	
1969-129b	1942-05-12	daily	
1969-129c	1942-11-02	daily	
1969-129d	1942-11-03	daily	
1969-130a	1942-11-04	daily	
1969-130b	1942-11-05	daily	
1969-130c	1942-11-06	daily	
1969-130d	1942-11-11	daily	
1969-131a	1944-02-10	daily	
1969-131b	1944-02-09	daily	
1969-131c		daily	1/12/193x?
1969-131d		daily	1/13/193x?
1969-132	1941-06-15	Sunday	
1969-133a	1935-12-30	daily	
1969-133b	1936-01-02	daily	
1969-133c	1936-01-03	daily	
1969-133d	1936-01-04	daily	
1969-134-5	1917-06-17		
1969-136	1928-12-30	Sunday	
1969-137a	1937-12-24	daily	
1969-137b	1937-12-25	daily	
1969-137c	1937-12-27	daily	
1969-137d	1937-12-28	daily	
1969-138a	1943-04-12	daily	
1969-138b	1943-04-13	daily	
1969-138c	1943-04-16	daily	
1969-138d	1943-04-14	daily	
1969-139a	1943-05-03	daily	
1969-139b	1943-05-04	daily	
1969-139c	1939-05-08	daily	
1969-139d	1941-03-09	daily	?year
1969-140a		daily	1/3/193x?
1969-140b		daily	1/4/193x?
1969-140c		daily	1/5/193x?
1969-140d		daily	1/6/193x?
1969-141	1941-03-09	Sunday	
1969-142	1933-07-23	Sunday	
1969-143a	1941-12-22	daily	
1969-143b	1941-12-23	daily	
1969-143c	1941-12-25	daily	
1969-143d	1941-12-30	daily	
1969-144a		daily	11/27/194x?
1969-144b		daily	6/13/193x?
1969-144c		daily	3/22/193x?
1969-144d		daily	3/3/193x?
1969-145a	1940-02-19	daily	
1969-145b	1940-02-20	daily	
1969-145c	1940-02-21	daily	
1969-145d	1940-02-22	daily	
1969-146a		daily	4/7/193x?
1969-146b		daily	2/23/193x?
1969-146c		daily	2/24/193x?
1969-146d	1939-04-08	daily	
1969-147a	1941-04-07	daily	
1969-147b	1939-09-20	daily	
1969-147c	1943-11-16	daily	
1969-147d	1943-04-08	daily	
1969-148a		daily	6/17/194x?
1969-148b	1943-04-06	daily	
1969-148c	1943-04-07	daily	
1969-148d	1943-04-22	daily	
1969-149a	1938-03-07	daily	
1969-149b	1938-03-08	daily	
1969-149c	1938-03-09	daily	
1969-149d	1938-03-10	daily	
1969-150a	1938-03-11	daily	
1969-150b	1938-03-12	daily	
1969-150c	1938-03-14	daily	
1969-150d	1938-03-15	daily	
1969-151a	1938-03-16	daily	
1969-151b	1938-03-17	daily	
1969-151c	1938-03-18	daily	
1969-151d	1938-03-19	daily	
1969-152a		daily	12/29/194x?
1969-152b		daily	12/30/194x?
1969-152c		daily	12/31/194x?
1969-152d		daily	1/1/194x?
1969-154a		daily	4/2/19xx?
1969-154b		daily	4/11/19xx?
1969-154c	1943-09-17	daily	
1969-154d		daily	10/28/194x?
1969-155a		daily	3/28/1944x?
1969-155b	1943-10-18	daily	
1969-155c	1936-01-27	daily	?year
1969-155d		daily	1/5/19xx?
1969-156	1942-07-26	Sunday	
1969-157a	1943-10-28	daily	
1969-157b		daily	3/7/19xx?
1969-157c	1940-11-21	daily	
1969-157d		daily	7/1/194x?
1969-158a	1927-02-14	daily	
1969-158b	1927-02-15	daily	
1969-159a	1939-07-19	daily	
1969-159b	1939-07-17	daily	
1969-159c	1939-07-18	daily	
1969-159d	1939-07-20	daily	
1969-160a		daily	6/7/193x?
1969-160b	1941-01-10	daily	
1969-160c		daily	11/29/193x?
1969-160d	1943-06-03	daily	
1969-161	1932-03-13	Sunday	
1969-162a		daily	12/25/193x?
1969-162b		daily	12/26/193x?
1969-162c	1943-11-19	daily	
1969-162d	1943-11-20	daily	
1969-163a	1937-07-14	daily	
1969-163b	1937-07-15	daily	
1969-163c	1937-07-16	daily	
1969-163d	1937-07-17	daily	
1969-164a		daily	6/20/19xx?
1969-164b	1941-05-21	daily	
1969-164c	1941-06-19	daily	
1969-164d	1942-10-19	daily	
1969-165	1916-10-15	Sunday	
1969-166a	1941-06-16	daily	
1969-166b		daily	1/5/194x?
1969-166c	1941-07-14	daily	
1969-166d		daily	6/13/194x?
1969-167a	1941-12-06	daily	
1969-167b	1941-03-31	daily	
1969-167c	1944-05-02	daily	
1969-167d	1944-05-29	daily	
1969-168	1917-06-17	Sunday	epitaph from end of strip
1969-Back	1943-05-09	Sunday	color

=== Street Enterprises (Menomonee Falls) ===
- (George Herriman's) Krazy Kat Vol. 1, No. 1 (March 1973): 32-page newsprint magazine reprinting 60 daily strips from July 3 – October 28, 1933. Inside cover claims inaccurately that they are from 1935.

=== Real Free Press ===
- Krazy Kat Komix, Nos. 1–5 (1974–1976): Joost Swarte, ed. The 5-issue magazine also features other Herriman strips.

=== Hyperion Press ===
- The Family Upstairs: Introducing Krazy Kat: The Complete Strip, 1910–1912 (1977, 1992): Introduction by Bill Blackbeard. ISBN 0-88355-643-X (hardcover), ISBN 0-88355-642-1 (softcover)

=== Harry N. Abrams ===
- Krazy Kat: The Comic Art of George Herriman (1986): Patrick McDonnell, Karen O'Connell, eds. Various strips in B&W and color, mostly from original art, including some watercolor paintings. ISBN 0-8109-8152-1 (hardcover), ISBN 0-8109-9185-3 (softcover)

Contents of book:
Page	Date	Daily/Sunday	Notes
1986-004-005	1939-08-30	daily	
1986-007	1917-11-11	Sunday	color orig
1986-008	1919-06-22	Sunday	
1986-011	1941-12-21	Sunday	
1986-012	1939-06-11	Sunday	
1986-014	1938-10-16	Sunday	color orig
1986-019	1935-07-22	daily	
1986-021	1922-10-15	Sunday	
1986-023	1943-02-28	Sunday	
1986-026-027		daily	2 early, 'underneath' strips
1986-029	1919-05-04	Sunday	
1986-032	1915-05-12	daily	
1986-041		daily	early 5 panel vert
1986-055a	1910-07-29	daily	Dingbat w/cat & mouse
1986-055b	1910-11-22	daily	under strip
1986-055c	1911-07-18	daily	under strip
1986-056	1917-12-24	daily	
1986-057	1928-03-04	Sunday	
1986-059a	1912-07-02	daily	
1986-059b	1912-07-05	daily	
1986-059c	1912-07-15	daily	
1986-059d	1912-07-16	daily	
1986-060	1917-12-09	Sunday	
1986-061	1918-01-06	daily	mis-captioned:Jan 6 was a Sunday
1986-062	1918-05-04	daily	
1986-063	1919-12-25	daily	
1986-069	1940-09-23	daily	
1986-077	1918-10-15	daily	partial
1986-082	1938-03-08	daily	
1986-085a	1936-06-24	daily	
1986-085b			April 1944, unfnished
1986-089	1919-03-07	daily	
1986-090a	1918-01-21	daily	
1986-090b	1918-02-12	daily	
1986-090c	1920-05-24	daily	
1986-090d	1920-08-17	daily	
1986-091a	1920-08-30	daily	
1986-091b	1921-09-21	daily	
1986-091c	1921-09-23	daily	
1986-091d	1922-07-22	daily	
1986-092a	1923-10-06	daily	
1986-092b	1930-11-06	daily	
1986-092c	1938-07-04	daily	
1986-092d	1938-07-05	daily	
1986-093a	1938-07-09	daily	
1986-093b	1938-07-29	daily	
1986-093c	1938-07-30	daily	
1986-093d	1938-09-05	daily	
1986-094a	1935-10-26	daily	
1986-094b	1938-09-06	daily	
1986-094c	1938-09-07	daily	
1986-094d	1938-09-09	daily	
1986-095a	1938-09-10	daily	
1986-095b	1938-10-24	daily	
1986-095c	1938-10-25	daily	
1986-095d	1938-10-26	daily	
1986-096a	1938-10-27	daily	
1986-096b	1938-10-28	daily	
1986-096c	1938-10-29	daily	
1986-096d	1939-01-23	daily	
1986-097a	1939-01-24	daily	
1986-097b	1939-01-25	daily	
1986-097c	1939-01-26	daily	
1986-097d	1939-06-13	daily	
1986-098a	1939-06-14	daily	
1986-098b	1939-06-16	daily	
1986-098c	1939-06-17	daily	
1986-098d	1939-11-13	daily	
1986-099a	1939-11-14	daily	
1986-099b	1939-11-15	daily	
1986-099c	1939-11-16	daily	
1986-099d	1939-11-17	daily	
1986-100a	1939-11-18	daily	
1986-100b	1940-09-09	daily	
1986-100c	1940-09-11	daily	
1986-100d	1940-09-12	daily	
1986-101a	1940-09-13	daily	
1986-101b	1940-09-14	daily	
1986-101c	1941-02-10	daily	
1986-101d	1941-02-11	daily	
1986-102a	1941-02-12	daily	
1986-102b	1941-02-13	daily	
1986-102c	1941-02-14	daily	
1986-102d	1941-02-15	daily	
1986-103a	1941-04-26	daily	
1986-103b	1941-06-02	daily	
1986-103c	1941-06-03	daily	
1986-103d	1941-06-04	daily	
1986-104a	1941-06-05	daily	
1986-104b	1941-06-06	daily	
1986-104c	1941-06-07	daily	
1986-104d	1941-07-21	daily	
1986-105a	1942-07-27	daily	
1986-105b	1942-07-28	daily	
1986-105c	1942-07-29	daily	
1986-105d	1942-07-30	daily	
1986-106a	1942-07-31	daily	
1986-106b	1942-08-01	daily	
1986-106c	1943-04-10	daily	
1986-106d	1943-07-01	daily	
1986-107a	1943-07-02	daily	
1986-107b	1943-07-03	daily	
1986-107c	1944-01-14	daily	
1986-107d	1944-01-15	daily	
1986-108	1916-04-23	Sunday	
1986-109	1916-04-30	Sunday	
1986-110	1916-12-03	Sunday	color orig
1986-111	1918-11-17	Sunday	color orig; mis-captioned 1916
1986-112	1916-09-03	Sunday	
1986-113	1916-09-17	Sunday	
1986-114	1916-05-21	Sunday	color orig
1986-115	1936-08-08	Sunday	color orig
1986-116	1916-10-15	Sunday	
1986-117	1916-12-03	Sunday	
1986-118	1937-10-17	Sunday	
1986-119	1938-03-06	Sunday	
1986-120	1917-01-14	Sunday	
1986-121	1917-06-17	Sunday	
1986-122	1917-08-19	Sunday	
1986-123	1917-09-09	Sunday	
1986-124	1917-09-16	Sunday	
1986-125	1917-09-23	Sunday	
1986-126	1940-03-10	Sunday	
1986-127	1940-04-14	Sunday	
1986-128	1917-01-21	Sunday	mis-captioned 11/21
1986-129	1918-01-06	Sunday	
1986-130	1918-02-03	Sunday	
1986-131	1918-04-14	Sunday	mis-captioned 4/4
1986-132	1918-05-05	Sunday	
1986-133	1918-06-30	Sunday	mis-captioned 6/3
1986-134	1918-07-21	Sunday	
1986-135	1918-08-11	Sunday	mis-captioned 8/14
1986-136	1918-08-25	Sunday	
1986-137	1918-09-29	Sunday	
1986-138	1940-04-21	Sunday	
1986-139	1940-05-05	Sunday	
1986-140	1918-10-27	Sunday	
1986-141	1918-11-10	Sunday	
1986-142	1940-06-02	Sunday	mis-captioned 6/1
1986-143	1940-07-14	Sunday	
1986-144	1918-12-15	Sunday	
1986-145	1918-01-27	Sunday	mis-captioned 1/20
1986-146	1919-02-02	Sunday	
1986-147	1919-03-09	Sunday	
1986-148	1919-03-16	Sunday	
1986-149	1919-03-30	Sunday	
1986-150	1940-10-06	Sunday	
1986-151	1940-11-10	Sunday	
1986-152	1919-05-18	Sunday	
1986-153	1919-07-27	Sunday	
1986-154	1919-09-07	Sunday	
1986-155	1919-09-28	Sunday	
1986-156	1919-12-07	Sunday	
1986-157	1917-12-30	Sunday	mis-captioned 12/21/1919
1986-158	1940-11-17	Sunday	
1986-159	1941-01-12	Sunday	
1986-160	1919-12-28	Sunday	
1986-161	1920-10-10	Sunday	captioned "c. 1919"
1986-162	1941-01-26	Sunday	mis-captioned 1/25
1986-163	1941-03-09	Sunday	
1986-164	1920-03-21	Sunday	
1986-165	1920-04-25	Sunday	
1986-166	1921-09-25	Sunday	
1986-167	1922-02-05	Sunday	
1986-168	1922-04-02	Sunday	
1986-169	1922-04-16	Sunday	
1986-170	1941-03-23	Sunday	
1986-171	1941-04-13	Sunday	
1986-172	1922-05-14	Sunday	
1986-173	1922-06-18	Sunday	
1986-174	1941-05-11	Sunday	
1986-175	1941-07-06	Sunday	
1986-176	1922-07-16	Sunday	
1986-177	1922-07-23	Sunday	
1986-178	1941-07-27	Sunday	
1986-179	1941-10-05	Sunday	
1986-180	1922-09-10	Sunday	
1986-181	1922-11-12	Sunday	
1986-182	1920-11-28	Sunday	
1986-183	1920-08-22	Sunday	mis-captioned 5/5
1986-184	1925-02-15	Sunday	
1986-186	1925-11-22	Sunday	
1986-186	1941-10-12	Sunday	
1986-187	1941-10-26	Sunday	
1986-188	1926-03-07	Sunday	
1986-189	1926-05-23	Sunday	
1986-190	1941-11-16	Sunday	
1986-191	1941-11-30	Sunday	
1986-192	1928-01-08	Sunday	mis-captioned 7/29/1929
1986-193	1933-03-12	Sunday	
1986-194	1935-11-03	Sunday	
1986-195	1937-04-04	Sunday	
1986-196	1938-05-15	Sunday	
1986-197	1942-12-27	Sunday	
1986-198	1939-07-02	Sunday	
1986-199	1939-07-23	Sunday	
1986-200	1939-07-30	Sunday	
1986-201	1940-09-08	Sunday	
1986-202	1940-11-03	Sunday	
1986-203	1941-02-23	Sunday	
1986-204	1943-03-07	Sunday	
1986-205	1943-04-11	Sunday	
1986-206	1942-01-11	Sunday	
1986-207	1942-01-25	Sunday	
1986-208	1941-09-14	Sunday	mis-captioned 43
1986-209	1944-04-23	Sunday	
1986-210	1944-02-20	Sunday	
1986-211	1944-06-25	Sunday	LAST Sunday strip
1986-214		daily	10/?/1915
1986-217		daily	?/?/1915
1986-220	1922-06-11	Sunday	

=== Morning Star Publications ===
- Coconino Chronicle (1988): Alec Finlay, ed. 130 strips from 1927 to 1928.

=== Eclipse Comics ===
Krazy and Ignatz: The Komplete Kat Komics (series): Bill Blackbeard, ed. Each of these volumes reprints a year of Sunday strips.

- Vol 1: Krazy & Ignatz (1988): 1916 strips. ISBN 0-913035-49-1
- Vol 2: The Other Side To the Shore Of Here (1989): 1917 strips. ISBN 0-913035-74-2
- Vol 3: The Limbo of Useless Unconsciousness (1989): 1918 strips. ISBN 0-913035-76-9
- Vol 4: Howling Among the Halls of Night (1989): 1919 strips. ISBN 1-56060-019-5
- Vol 5: Pilgrims on the Road to Nowhere (1990): 1920 strips. ISBN 1-56060-023-3
- Vol 6: Sure As Moons is Cheeses (1990): 1921 strips. ISBN 1-56060-034-9
- Vol 7: A Katnip Kantata in the Key of K (1991): 1922 strips, including 10 color Saturday strips. ISBN 1-56060-063-2
- Vol 8: Inna Yott On the Muddy Geranium (1991): 1923 strips. ISBN 1-56060-066-7
- Vol 9: Shed a Soft Mongolian Tear (1992): 1924 strips. ISBN 1-56060-102-7
- Vol 10: Honeysuckil Love Is Doubly Swit (unpublished): 1925 strips. ISBN 1-56060-203-1

=== Kitchen Sink Press ===
The Komplete Kolor Krazy Kat (series). Each volume reprinted two years of Sundays. The publisher dissolved before the series' aim of completeness could be achieved.

- Vol 1: 1935–1936 (1990): Rick Marshall, Bill Watterson, contributors. ISBN 0-924359-06-4
- Vol 2: 1936–1937 (1991): Rick Marshall, ed. ISBN 0-924359-07-2

=== Stinging Monkey/BookSurge ===
- Krazy & Ignatz, The Dailies. Vol 1: 1918–1919 (2001, 2003): Gregory Fink, ed., introduction by Bill Blackbeard. Stinging Monkey edition in large format, ISBN 978-0-9688676-0-0. BookSurge reprint in smaller 7.9 × 6 inch format, ISBN 1-59109-975-7, ISBN 978-1-59109-975-8. Reprints complete run of dailies from Aug 26, 1918, to Jun 28, 1919.

=== Pacific Comics ===
All the Daily Strips.... (series) 6¼ x 6¼ inch format.

- Krazy Kat vol 1: 1921 (2003)
- Krazy Kat vol 2: 1922 (2004)
- Krazy Kat Vol 3: 1923 (2005)

Presents Krazy and Ignatz (series) Four 3¼ x 4 inch volumes reproducing the 1921 strips in miniature.

=== Fantagraphics Books ===
In 2002, Fantagraphics began to publish a series of paperbacks – picking up where Eclipse Comics left off – with introductory essays and other bonuses, such as rare artworks and photographs. Bill Blackbeard is the series editor, Chris Ware the cover and interior designer. For the first time ever, Fantagraphics reprinted the entirety of Krazy Kat Sundays: the first ten volumes collect two years worth of Sundays each (the first five in black and white, the last five in color – reflecting the shift in the original newspaper version); the last three paperbacks comprise the black and white Sundays already reprinted by Eclipse, presenting three years worth of material per volume.

- Krazy & Ignatz in "There Is A Heppy Lend Furfur A-Waay": 1925–1926 (2002) ISBN 1-56097-386-2
- Krazy & Ignatz in "Love Letters In Ancient Brick": 1927–1928 (2002) ISBN 1-56097-507-5
- Krazy & Ignatz in "A Mice, A Brick, A Lovely Night": 1929–1930 (2003) ISBN 1-56097-529-6
- Krazy & Ignatz in "A Kat Alilt with Song": 1931–1932 (2004) ISBN 1-56097-594-6
- Krazy & Ignatz in "Necromancy by the Blue Bean Bush": 1933–1934 (2005) ISBN 1-56097-620-9
  - Krazy & Ignatz: The Complete Sunday Strips: 1925–1934: Collects the previous five paperbacks in a single hardcover volume. Only 1000 copies printed, only available by direct order from the publisher. ISBN 1-56097-522-9
- Krazy & Ignatz in "A Wild Warmth of Chromatic Gravy": 1935–1936 (2005) ISBN 1-56097-690-X, 2005
- Krazy & Ignatz in "Shifting Sands Dusts its Cheeks in Powdered Beauty": 1937–1938 (2006) ISBN 1-56097-734-5
- Krazy & Ignatz in "A Brick Stuffed with Moom-bins": 1939–1940 (2007) ISBN 1-56097-789-2
- Krazy & Ignatz in "A Ragout of Raspberries": 1941–1942 (2007) ISBN 1-56097-887-2
- Krazy & Ignatz in "He Nods in Quiescent Siesta": 1943–1944 (2008) ISBN 1-56097-932-1
  - Krazy & Ignatz: The Complete Sunday Strips: 1935–1944: Collects the previous five paperbacks in a single hardcover volume. Only 1000 copies printed, only available by direct order from the publisher. ISBN 978-1-56097-841-1
- Krazy & Ignatz in "Love in a Kestle or Love in a Hut": 1916–1918 (2010) ISBN 1-60699-316-X
- Krazy & Ignatz in "A Kind, Benevolent and Amiable Brick": 1919–1921 (2011) ISBN 1-60699-364-X
- Krazy & Ignatz in "At Last My Drim of Love Has Come True": 1922–1924 (2012) ISBN 1-60699-477-8 (also includes the complete Us Husbands, another strip of Herriman, unrelated to Krazy Kat)
  - Krazy & Ignatz: The Complete Sunday Strips: 1916–1924: Collects the previous three paperbacks in a single hardcover volume. Only 1000 copies printed, only available by direct order from the publisher. ISBN 1-60699-428-X
- Krazy & Ignatz: The Kat Who Walked in Beauty (2007) ISBN 1-56097-854-6: This volume, unrelated to the previous collections (both in design and format), is a horizontal hardcover which reprints:
  - Some daily strips from 1911 and 1912 (including a sequence from July 2 to 16) and 32 from 1914 (only a few of which can be dated by cross reference to other collections).
  - Plus (in large-format) all daily strips from March 4 to October 30, 1920 and from September 13 to October 15, 1921 (except Sept. 15, 19, 20, 27, 30, and Oct. 5-7).
  - Also included is the artwork that Herriman drew for the program of a 1922 pantomime ballet based on Krazy Kat (reproduced larger than in the Eclipse 1923 and The George Herriman Library 1922–1924 collections).

Starting from 2019, Fantagraphics began to publish a new collection of Krazy Kat Sundays. The George Herriman Library: Krazy & Ignatz, a series of deluxe hardcovers, whose format is much wider than those of the previous paperbacks, collects 3 years worth of Sundays per volume. The bonus material, while largely similar to the previous collections, presents some differences, though, such as new essays and images. Michael Catron and Bill Blackbeard are the series editors, while Keeli McCarthy is the cover and interior designer.

- The George Herriman Library: Krazy & Ignatz 1916–1918 (2019) ISBN 978-1-6839-6255-7
- The George Herriman Library: Krazy & Ignatz 1919–1921 (2020) ISBN 978-1-6839-6367-7
- The George Herriman Library: Krazy & Ignatz 1922–1924 (2022) ISBN 978-1-6839-6477-3
- The George Herriman Library: Krazy & Ignatz 1925–1927 (2023) ISBN 978-1-6839-6674-6
- The George Herriman Library: Krazy & Ignatz 1928–1930 (2025) ISBN 979-8-8750-0040-9

=== Sunday Press Books ===
- Krazy Kat: A Celebration of Sundays (2010): Patrick McDonnell, Peter Maresca, eds. Sunday Press Books. Various Sundays reprinted in their original size and colors. ISBN 0-9768885-8-0 (hardcover)

Contents of book:
Page	Date	Daily/Sunday	Notes
CelebSundays-001	1917-10-28	Sunday	orig, color
CelebSundays-004	1918-06-09	Sunday	
CelebSundays-007		Daily	1912, orig
CelebSundays-008	1916-04-23	Sunday	
CelebSundays-009	1916-04-30	Sunday	
CelebSundays-010	1916-05-21	Sunday	
CelebSundays-011	1916-06-11	Sunday	
CelebSundays-012	1916-09-03	Sunday	
CelebSundays-013	1916-10-15	Sunday	
CelebSundays-014	1916-10-29	Sunday	
CelebSundays-015	1916-11-12	Sunday	
CelebSundays-016	1916-11-19	Sunday	
CelebSundays-017	1916-12-03	Sunday	
CelebSundays-018	1916-12-31	Sunday	
CelebSundays-019	1917-02-18	Sunday	
CelebSundays-020	1917-03-04	Sunday	
CelebSundays-021	1917-03-11	Sunday	
CelebSundays-022	1917-05-06	Sunday	
CelebSundays-023	1917-09-09	Sunday	
CelebSundays-024	1917-09-16	Sunday	
CelebSundays-025	1917-09-23	Sunday	
CelebSundays-026	1917-10-28	Sunday	
CelebSundays-027	1917-12-02	Sunday	
CelebSundays-028	1918-01-09	Sunday	
CelebSundays-029	1918-03-17	Sunday	
CelebSundays-030	1918-03-24	Sunday	
CelebSundays-031	1918-06-23	Sunday	
CelebSundays-032	1918-07-07	Sunday	
CelebSundays-033	1918-07-14	Sunday	
CelebSundays-034	1918-08-04	Sunday	
CelebSundays-035	1918-08-18	Sunday	
CelebSundays-036	1918-09-29	Sunday	
CelebSundays-037	1918-10-06	Sunday	
CelebSundays-038	1918-10-27	Sunday	
CelebSundays-039	1918-11-03	Sunday	
CelebSundays-040	1918-11-24	Sunday	
CelebSundays-041	1918-12-01	Sunday	
CelebSundays-042	1919-01-05	Sunday	
CelebSundays-043	1919-01-26	Sunday	
CelebSundays-044	1919-02-16	Sunday	
CelebSundays-045	1919-04-06	Sunday	
CelebSundays-046	1919-04-13	Sunday	
CelebSundays-047	1919-04-20	Sunday	
CelebSundays-048	1919-04-27	Sunday	
CelebSundays-049	1919-05-11	Sunday	
CelebSundays-050	1919-06-15	Sunday	
CelebSundays-051	1919-06-22	Sunday	
CelebSundays-052	1919-07-20	Sunday	
CelebSundays-053	1919-08-03	Sunday	
CelebSundays-054	1919-08-10	Sunday	
CelebSundays-055	1919-08-31	Sunday	
CelebSundays-056	1919-09-07	Sunday	
CelebSundays-057	1919-09-14	Sunday	
CelebSundays-058	1921-09-11	Sunday	
CelebSundays-059	1922-01-21	Sunday	color
CelebSundays-060	1922-01-28	Sunday	color
CelebSundays-061	1922-02-25	Sunday	color
CelebSundays-062	1922-03-05	Sunday	
CelebSundays-063	1922-04-16	Sunday	
CelebSundays-064	1922-06-11	Sunday	
CelebSundays-065	1922-06-18	Sunday	
CelebSundays-066	1922-07-02	Sunday	
CelebSundays-067	1923-01-28	Sunday	
CelebSundays-068	1923-02-11	Sunday	
CelebSundays-069	1924-01-06	Sunday	
CelebSundays-070	1927-09-04	Sunday	
CelebSundays-071	1929-05-19	Sunday	
CelebSundays-072	1930-12-28	Sunday	
CelebSundays-073	1935-06-01	Sunday	color
CelebSundays-074	1935-10-06	Sunday	color
CelebSundays-075	1936-05-17	Sunday	color
CelebSundays-076	1937-01-17	Sunday	color
CelebSundays-077	1937-04-04	Sunday	color
CelebSundays-078	1937-11-14	Sunday	color
CelebSundays-079	1937-11-28	Sunday	color
CelebSundays-080	1937-12-26	Sunday	color
CelebSundays-081	1938-01-02	Sunday	color
CelebSundays-082	1938-01-30	Sunday	color
CelebSundays-083	1938-03-06	Sunday	color
CelebSundays-084	1938-04-24	Sunday	color
CelebSundays-085	1938-05-15	Sunday	color
CelebSundays-086	1938-08-07	Sunday	color
CelebSundays-087	1938-08-21	Sunday	color
CelebSundays-088	1938-08-21	Sunday	color
CelebSundays-089	1938-09-11	Sunday	color
CelebSundays-090	1938-10-09	Sunday	color
CelebSundays-091	1938-11-27	Sunday	color
CelebSundays-092	1938-12-11	Sunday	color
CelebSundays-093	1938-12-25	Sunday	color
CelebSundays-094	1939-01-08	Sunday	color
CelebSundays-095	1939-05-21	Sunday	color
CelebSundays-096	1939-06-11	Sunday	color
CelebSundays-097	1939-07-30	Sunday	color
CelebSundays-098	1939-08-27	Sunday	color
CelebSundays-099	1939-10-22	Sunday	color
CelebSundays-100	1939-10-29	Sunday	color
CelebSundays-101	1939-11-12	Sunday	color
CelebSundays-102	1939-12-17	Sunday	color
CelebSundays-103	1939-12-31	Sunday	color
CelebSundays-104	1940-03-10	Sunday	color
CelebSundays-105	1940-04-21	Sunday	color
CelebSundays-106	1940-05-05	Sunday	color
CelebSundays-107	1940-05-12	Sunday	color
CelebSundays-108	1940-06-01	Sunday	color
CelebSundays-109	1940-07-07	Sunday	color
CelebSundays-110	1940-07-14	Sunday	color
CelebSundays-111	1940-10-06	Sunday	color
CelebSundays-112	1940-11-03	Sunday	color
CelebSundays-113	1941-01-25	Sunday	color
CelebSundays-114	1941-06-08	Sunday	color
CelebSundays-115	1941-06-15	Sunday	color
CelebSundays-116	1941-07-27	Sunday	color
CelebSundays-117	1941-08-24	Sunday	color
CelebSundays-118	1941-10-26	Sunday	color
CelebSundays-119	1941-11-08	Sunday	color
CelebSundays-120	1941-11-22	Sunday	color
CelebSundays-121	1941-12-20	Sunday	color
CelebSundays-122	1943-02-07	Sunday	color
CelebSundays-123	1943-03-07	Sunday	color
CelebSundays-124	1943-04-11	Sunday	color
CelebSundays-125	1943-06-20	Sunday	color
CelebSundays-126	1943-06-27	Sunday	color
CelebSundays-127	1943-08-29	Sunday	color
CelebSundays-128	1943-09-05	Sunday	color
CelebSundays-129	1943-09-12	Sunday	color
CelebSundays-130	1943-10-17	Sunday	color
CelebSundays-131	1943-11-21	Sunday	color
CelebSundays-132	1943-12-12	Sunday	color
CelebSundays-133	1943-12-19	Sunday	color
CelebSundays-134	1944-03-19	Sunday	color
CelebSundays-135	1944-06-11	Sunday	color
CelebSundays-136	1944-06-25	Sunday	color
CelebSundays-160		Daily	1944, unfinished

=== Abrams ComicArts ===
- Krazy Kat & the Art of George Herriman: A Celebration (August 2011): Craig Yoe, ed. (hardcover). ISBN 978-0-8109-9594-9 Includes more than a dozen (new and old) essays, and reproductions of non-strip art pertaining to Krazy Kat and Herriman's other works.

Pages of book with Krazy Kat strips:
Page	Date	Daily/Sunday	Notes
Art of GH-18	1941-08-10	Sunday	
Art of GH-19	1937-02-14	Sunday	
Art of GH-20	1938-05-15	Sunday	
Art of GH-21	1938-12-11	Sunday	
Art of GH-22	1940-10-06	Sunday	
Art of GH-23	1941-05-11	Sunday	
Art of GH-24	1941-12-21	Sunday	
Art of GH-25	1942-12-27	Sunday	
Art of GH-26	1943-09-26	Sunday	
Art of GH-39	1922-01-21	Sunday	color
Art of GH-42	1926-01-22	Daily	orig
Art of GH-44a		Daily	191x-?; Dingbats w/ KK under
Art of GH-44b	1939-09-30	Daily	orig
Art of GH-46	1922-04-19	Daily	orig, color
Art of GH-48a	1932-06-18	Daily	orig
Art of GH-48b	1918-01-17	Daily	
Art of GH-49	1939-07-06	Daily	orig
Art of GH-52a	1943-04-03	Daily	
Art of GH-52b	1939-11-17	Daily	
Art of GH-53	1930-11-06	Daily	
Art of GH-55	1916-12-03	Sunday	orig, color
Art of GH-56	1922-03-11	Sunday	orig, color
Art of GH-57	1916-07-02	Sunday	orig, color
Art of GH-58	1939-06-04	Sunday	orig
Art of GH-59	1918-11-17	Sunday	orig, color
Art of GH-60	1939-06-25	Sunday	orig
Art of GH-61	1917-02-11	Sunday	orig, color
Art of GH-62	1918-05-05	Sunday	orig
Art of GH-63	1917-11-04	Sunday	orig
Art of GH-64	1917-10-28	Sunday	orig, color
Art of GH-65	1936-07-25	Sunday	orig
Art of GH-66	1919-05-18	Sunday	orig, color
Art of GH-67	1918-06-30	Sunday	orig, color
Art of GH-68	1922-04-16	Sunday	
Art of GH-69	1932-12-25	Sunday	orig
Art of GH-70	1932-05-01	Sunday	orig
Art of GH-71	1938-06-05	Sunday	orig, color
Art of GH-72	1917-09-09	Sunday	orig, color
Art of GH-73	1944-06-04	Sunday	orig
Art of GH-74		Sunday	unpublished, circa 25-30
Art of GH-117		Daily	circa 1920; "wash-boila"
Art of GH-172		Daily	2 unfin, 1944

=== IDW Publishing ===
- George Herriman's Krazy + Ignatz in Tiger Tea (January 2010): Craig Yoe, ed. Collects the "Tiger Tea" storyline from the daily strips, May 1936 – March 1937. ISBN 978-1-60010-645-3 (hardcover).

Contents of book:
Page	Date	Daily/Sunday	Notes
TT-Yoe-016	1924-10-26	Sunday	Krazy's b'day
TT-Yoe-020	1927-03-13	Sunday	surreal kats
TT-Yoe-025	1919-05-18	Sunday	katnip field
TT-Yoe-029	1936-05-15	Daily	
TT-Yoe-030	1936-05-16	Daily	
TT-Yoe-031	1936-05-25	Daily	
TT-Yoe-032	1936-05-26	Daily	
TT-Yoe-033	1936-05-27	Daily	
TT-Yoe-034	1936-05-28	Daily	
TT-Yoe-035	1936-05-29	Daily	
TT-Yoe-036	1936-05-30	Daily	
TT-Yoe-037	1936-06-01	Daily	
TT-Yoe-038	1936-06-02	Daily	
TT-Yoe-039	1936-06-03	Daily	
TT-Yoe-040	1936-06-04	Daily	
TT-Yoe-041	1936-06-05	Daily	
TT-Yoe-042	1936-06-06	Daily	
TT-Yoe-043	1936-06-08	Daily	
TT-Yoe-044	1936-06-09	Daily	
TT-Yoe-045	1936-06-10	Daily	
TT-Yoe-046	1936-06-11	Daily	
TT-Yoe-047	1936-06-12	Daily	
TT-Yoe-048	1936-06-13	Daily	
TT-Yoe-049	1936-06-15	Daily	
TT-Yoe-050	1936-06-16	Daily	
TT-Yoe-051	1936-06-17	Daily	
TT-Yoe-052	1936-06-18	Daily	
TT-Yoe-053	1936-06-19	Daily	
TT-Yoe-054	1936-06-20	Daily	
TT-Yoe-055	1936-06-22	Daily	
TT-Yoe-056	1936-06-23	Daily	
TT-Yoe-057	1936-06-24	Daily	
TT-Yoe-058	1936-06-25	Daily	
TT-Yoe-059	1936-06-26	Daily	
TT-Yoe-060	1936-06-27	Daily	
TT-Yoe-061	1936-06-29	Daily	
TT-Yoe-062	1936-06-30	Daily	
TT-Yoe-063	1936-07-01	Daily	
TT-Yoe-064	1936-07-02	Daily	
TT-Yoe-065	1936-07-03	Daily	
TT-Yoe-066	1936-07-04	Daily	
TT-Yoe-067	1936-07-06	Daily	
TT-Yoe-068	1936-07-07	Daily	
TT-Yoe-069	1936-07-08	Daily	
TT-Yoe-070	1936-07-09	Daily	
TT-Yoe-071	1936-07-10	Daily	
TT-Yoe-072	1936-07-11	Daily	
TT-Yoe-073	1936-07-13	Daily	
TT-Yoe-074	1936-07-14	Daily	
TT-Yoe-075	1936-07-15	Daily	
TT-Yoe-076	1936-07-16	Daily	
TT-Yoe-077	1936-07-27	Daily	
TT-Yoe-078	1936-07-28	Daily	
TT-Yoe-079	1936-07-29	Daily	
TT-Yoe-080	1936-08-19	Daily	
TT-Yoe-081	1936-09-14	Daily	
TT-Yoe-082	1936-09-15	Daily	
TT-Yoe-083	1936-09-26	Daily	
TT-Yoe-084	1936-12-14	Daily	
TT-Yoe-085	1936-12-15	Daily	
TT-Yoe-086	1936-12-16	Daily	
TT-Yoe-087	1936-12-17	Daily	
TT-Yoe-088	1936-12-18	Daily	
TT-Yoe-089	1936-12-19	Daily	
TT-Yoe-090	1936-12-21	Daily	
TT-Yoe-091	1936-12-22	Daily	
TT-Yoe-092	1936-12-23	Daily	
TT-Yoe-093	1936-12-24	Daily	
TT-Yoe-094	1936-12-25	Daily	
TT-Yoe-095	1936-12-26	Daily	
TT-Yoe-096	1937-02-22	Daily	
TT-Yoe-097	1937-02-23	Daily	
TT-Yoe-098	1937-02-24	Daily	
TT-Yoe-099	1937-02-25	Daily	
TT-Yoe-100	1937-02-26	Daily	
TT-Yoe-101	1937-02-27	Daily	
TT-Yoe-102	1937-03-01	Daily	
TT-Yoe-103	1937-03-02	Daily	
TT-Yoe-104	1937-03-03	Daily	
TT-Yoe-105	1937-03-04	Daily	
TT-Yoe-106	1937-03-05	Daily	
TT-Yoe-107	1937-03-06	Daily	
TT-Yoe-108	1937-03-08	Daily	
TT-Yoe-109	1937-03-09	Daily	
TT-Yoe-110	1937-03-10	Daily	
TT-Yoe-111	1937-03-11	Daily	
TT-Yoe-112	1937-03-12	Daily	
TT-Yoe-113	1937-03-13	Daily	
TT-Yoe-114	1937-03-15	Daily	
TT-Yoe-115	1937-03-16	Daily	?date; TT & Katfish
TT-Yoe-116	1937-03-17	Daily	?date; TT vs Wolf Wine
TT-Yoe-117	1937-03-18	Daily	?date; TT vs Wolf Wine
TT-Yoe-118	1937-03-19	Daily	?date; TT & Katfish, Shark
TT-Yoe-119	1937-03-20	Daily	?date; TT vs Rat biscuit
TT-Yoe-121	1921-07-31	Sunday	katnip

- LOAC Essentials Presents King Features Volume 1: Krazy Kat 1934 By George Herriman (April 2016): Dean Mullaney, ed. Collects a years worth of daily strips, Dec 25, 1933 – Dec 31, 1934. ISBN 978-1-63140-408-5

=== 2016 biography ===
- Michael Tisserand's 2016 biography, Krazy: George Herriman, a Life in Black and White (Harper, hardcover, 560 pages, ISBN 978-0-0617-3299-7) is profusely illustrated with (mainly) single panels from Herriman's various comics. The table below lists only the panels from Krazy Kat, with dates from the book's captions.

Panels from Krazy Kat strips:
Page	Date	Daily/Sunday	Notes
GH-B&W-ii		Daily	"reading?"
GH-B&W-vi		Daily	looking at reader
GH-B&W-009	1917-03-22	Daily	
GH-B&W-017	1916-01-07	Daily	
GH-B&W-024	1921-07-27	Daily	
GH-B&W-028	1933-06-19	Daily	2 panels
GH-B&W-031	1938-12-02	Daily	2 panels
GH-B&W-036	1931-02-21	Daily	2 panels
GH-B&W-038	1941-05-04	Sunday	
GH-B&W-039	1931-03-13	Daily	2 panels
GH-B&W-043	1921-05-19	Daily	2 panels
GH-B&W-046	1934-10-15	Daily	
GH-B&W-049	1934-09-05	Daily	
GH-B&W-050	1917-04-01	Daily	
GH-B&W-051	1918-05-19	Daily	
GH-B&W-053	1915-05-12	Sunday	
GH-B&W-063	1931-03-25	Daily	
GH-B&W-065		Daily	"New Yorick"
GH-B&W-069	1933-12-25	Daily	
GH-B&W-075	1920-05-02	Sunday	
GH-B&W-087	1919-04-20	Sunday	
GH-B&W-122	1917-06-09	Daily	
GH-B&W-211		Daily	"It thrills me"
GH-B&W-243	1913-11-01	Daily	
GH-B&W-246	1916-11-25	Daily	
GH-B&W-248	1914-10-31	Daily	
GH-B&W-249	1916-12-22	Daily	
GH-B&W-256	1915-10-26	Daily	
GH-B&W-263	1916-02-18	Daily	
GH-B&W-266	1916-04-23	Sunday	
GH-B&W-270	1915-11-05	Daily	
GH-B&W-271	1919-02-08	Daily	
GH-B&W-274	1917-02-11	Sunday	
GH-B&W-276	1918-01-08	Daily	
GH-B&W-279	1917-07-17	Sunday	
GH-B&W-282	1917-12-25	Daily	
GH-B&W-285	1918-05-05	Sunday	
GH-B&W-287	1919-11-23	Sunday	
GH-B&W-288	1922-11-19	Sunday	
GH-B&W-298	1915-07-31	Daily	
GH-B&W-305	1921-07-31	Sunday	
GH-B&W-306	1921-07-31	Sunday	
GH-B&W-310	1922-04-16	Sunday	
GH-B&W-316	1918-08-11	Sunday	
GH-B&W-325	1921-03-18	Daily	
GH-B&W-328	1921-08-18	Daily	
GH-B&W-331		Daily	K&I into ink well
GH-B&W-336	1917-11-18	Sunday	
GH-B&W-341	1925-03-02	Daily	
GH-B&W-343	1919-11-24	Daily	
GH-B&W-344	1921-03-06	Sunday	
GH-B&W-347	1927-12-16	Daily	
GH-B&W-353	1927-03-02	Daily	
GH-B&W-356	1916-10-16	Daily	
GH-B&W-364	1931-06-19	Daily	
GH-B&W-368	1932-08-30	Daily	
GH-B&W-370	1932-04-03	Sunday	
GH-B&W-375	1933-01-16	Daily	
GH-B&W-383	1933-06-30	Daily	
GH-B&W-388	1936-07-10	Daily	
GH-B&W-394	1935-11-19	Daily	
GH-B&W-395	1937-12-12	Sunday	
GH-B&W-401	1940-02-11	Sunday	
GH-B&W-407	1939-12-10	Sunday	
GH-B&W-413	1942-08-30	Sunday	
GH-B&W-416	1943-01-20	Daily	
GH-B&W-418	1941-06-10	Daily	
GH-B&W-429	1944-06-25	Sunday	
GH-B&W-432a	1934-11-12	Daily	
GH-B&W-432b	1936-12-12	Daily	
GH-B&W-434	1934-06-23	Daily	
GH-B&W-438	1932-07-31	Sunday	
GH-B&W-439		Daily	"I thenk you"

=== Taschen ===
- George Herriman's "Krazy Kat": The Complete Color Sundays 1935-1944 (August 2019): Alexander Braun ed. XXL Hardcover (300 mm × 440 mm). 632 pages. Available in three languages. In January 2025, an XL Hardcover (265 mm × 366 mm) of the English Edition was released.
  - English (XXL) - ISBN 978-3-8365-6636-0
  - German (XXL) - ISBN 978-3-8365-7194-4
  - French (XXL) - ISBN 978-3-8365-7193-7
  - English (XL) - ISBN 978-3-7544-0130-9

=== Dover Publications ===
- Krazy Kat Collection: Selected Sunday Strips 1918–1919 (January 2020)' ISBN 979-8321374771: Paperback; 112 pages.

=== Mathiesen collections ===
- Cartoonist/writer Snorre Smári Mathiesen has edited and self-published a series of daily collections:
  - Krazy Kat - Dailies 1913-1914 ISBN 979-8321374771: Hardcover; 424 pages. The collection covers the period from late-October, 1913 through all of 1914, but several dozen are missing. For five days, the editor found two different strips which ran in separate newspapers. Also included are five strips from 1911, 1912 and 1913.
  - Krazy Kat - Dailies Nov 1913-Feb 1914 ISBN 978-1-9852-4306-4: Paperback; 60 pages.
  - Krazy Kat - Dailies Vol. 2: March–July 1914 ISBN 978-1-7235-6541-0: Paperback; 42 pages.
  - Krazy Kat: 1924 Daily Strips ISBN 979-8840214961: Original edition. Hardcover; 128 pages.
  - Krazy Kat: 1924 Daily Strips ISBN 979-8-8572-1643-9: Revised edition. Hardcover; 260 pages. Strips are printed larger than in earlier edition. The previous edition included various strips from June 1913 to March 1914, some of which had been included in the above collections. These strips are not mentioned in the introduction to the revised edition. From 1924, about 60 strips are missing. Nearly all of these missing strips have been collected in the editor's 1929 volume.
  - Krazy Kat: 1925 Daily Strips ISBN 979-8-3559-6731-4: Hardcover; 212 pages. Missing Jun 18 and Dec 25. These missing strips have been collected in the editor's 1929 volume.
  - Krazy Kat: 1926 Daily Strips ISBN 979-8-3748-3445-1: Hardcover; 312 pages. Missing December 1, 9, 25. The latter two missing strips have been collected in the editor's 1929 volume, where he also reports that December 1, 1926, was a repeat from 1924.
  - Krazy Kat: 1927 Daily Strips ISBN 979-8-3975-7183-8: Hardcover; 314 pages. Missing January 1 and December 26. These missing strips have been collected in the editor's 1929 volume.
  - Krazy Kat: 1928 Daily Strips ISBN 979-8-8741-5432-5: Hardcover; 314 pages. Missing July 4 and December 25.
  - Krazy Kat: 1929 Daily Strips ISBN 979-8-3054-7327-8: Hardcover; 344 pages. Missing are six weeks of strips which were repeated from 1925 and 1926 (the original run-dates are not provided).
  - Krazy Kat: 1930 Daily Strips ISBN 979-8241845573: Hardcover; 320 pages.

== See also ==
- The Krazy Kat Klub, a Bohemian nightspot in Washington, D.C. during the early decades of the 20th century, named after the comic strip.
