= The Case of the Screaming Bishop =

- Directed by: Howard Swift
- Story by: John McLeish
- Produced by: Paul Worth (uncredited)
- Starring: John McLeish
- Music by: Eddie Kilfeather
- Animation by: Jim Armstrong; Grant Simmons
- Production company: Screen Gems
- Distributed by: Columbia Pictures
- Release date: August 4, 1944
- Running time: 7 minutes
- Country: United States
- Language: English

The Case of the Screaming Bishop is a 1944 Phantasy cartoon directed by Howard Swift. It was produced by Screen Gems and was released by Columbia Pictures on August 4, 1944. The film is a parody of Sherlock Holmes.

The title of the film is based on the 1937 film The Case of the Stuttering Bishop.

== Plot ==
A dinosaur skeleton is stolen from the "Museum of Unnatural History" so Hairlock Combs and his assistant Dr. Gotsum (parodies of Holmes and Dr. Watson respectively) disguise themselves as a horse and visit the scene of the crime. It is ultimately revealed that the thief is a concert xylophonist who is obsessed with using the skeleton as his instrument. Throughout the film, he repeats the phrase, "The best bones of all go to Symphony Hall!"

== Cast ==
- John McLeish as Hairlock Combs, Dr. Gotsum, "X", Museum Guard, Policeman (voice, uncredited)
