= Parrot Carrot =

2011 children's book

- Author: Kate Temple, Jol Temple
- Cover artist: Jon Foye
- Language: English
- Genre: Children's book
- Publisher: Allen and Unwin
- Publication date: November 2011
- Publication place: Australia
- Media type: Print and interactive book
- ISBN: 978-1-74237-686-8

Parrot Carrot is a children's book written by Kate Temple and Jolyon Temple. It is illustrated by Jon Foye. The book is published by Australia's largest independent publisher, Allen and Unwin. The book has also been produced as an app. It is the world's first augmented reality children's book. The interactive ebook is voiced by noted Australian singer Kamahl.
