= National Simultaneous Storytime =

Annual book-reading event in Australia

National Simultaneous Storytime is an annual event held since 2000 by the Australian Library and Information Association. Every year a picture book, by an Australian children's author and illustrator is read simultaneously in libraries, schools, pre-schools, childcare centres, family homes and bookshops around Australia, as part of Australia's Library and Information Week. In 2018 over 1,062,230 participants at over 8,255 locations across Australia took part in National Simultaneous Storytime.

== History ==
The idea for a national simultaneous event followed a successful Statewide Storytime programme in Victoria in 2000. From 2002 – 2007 NSS took place during National Literacy and Numeracy Week in September. In 2008 it returned to being celebrated on the Wednesday of Australia's Library and Information Week at the end of May. In 2015 over 500,000 children at over 3,100 locations across Australia took part in National Simultaneous Storytime. In 2021 the NSS featured book Give Me Some Space! was read live to 1.98 million children across Australia and New Zealand, from the International Space Station by Shannon Walker, a NASA astronaut.

== Titles ==
This table lists the titles, authors and publishers of the selected picture book for each year of National Simultaneous Storytime.

| Year | Title | Author | Illustrator | Publisher | ISBN |
|---|---|---|---|---|---|
| 2001 | Edward the Emu | Sheena Knowles | Rod Clement | HarperCollins | 9780064434997 |
| 2002 | Mrs Wilkinson's Chooks | Leone Peguero | Mike Spoor | Random House | 9780091829360 |
| 2003 | I don't want to go to school | Christine Harris | Craig Smith | Random House | 9780091838812 |
| 2004 | Muddled-up Farm | Mike Dumbleton | Jobi Murphy | Random House | 9780857989789 |
| 2005 | Wombat Stew | Marcia K Vaughan | Pamela Lofts | Scholastic Australia | 9780868962580 |
| 2006 | Good Night, Me | Andrew Daddo | Emma Quay | Hachette | 9780734415851 |
| 2007 | The Magic Hat | Mem Fox | Tricia Tusa | Scholastic Australia | 9780152057152 |
| 2008 | Arthur | Amanda Graham | Donna Gynell | Era Publications | 9780947212124 |
| 2009 | Pete the Sheep | Jackie French | Bruce Whatley | HarperCollins | 9780207199745 |
| 2010 | Little White Dogs Can't Jump | Bruce Whatley and Rosie Smith | Bruce Whatley | HarperCollins | 9780207198830 |
| 2011 | Feathers for Phoebe | Rod Clement | Rod Clement | HarperCollins | 9780732289201 |
| 2012 | The Very Cranky Bear | Nick Bland | Nick Bland | Scholastic Australia | 9781741699920 |
| 2013 | The Wrong Book | Nick Bland | Nick Bland | Scholastic Australia | 9781741693416 |
| 2014 | Too Many Elephants in This House | Ursula Dubosarsky | Andrew Joyner | Penguin Books Australia | 9780670075461 |
| 2015 | The Brothers Quibble | Aaron Blabey | Aaron Blabey | Penguin Books Australia | 9780670076000 |
| 2016 | I Got This Hat | Kate and Jol Temple | Jon Foye | ABC Books | 9780733332302 |
| 2017 | The Cow Tripped Over the Moon | Tony Wilson | Laura Wood | Scholastic | 9781743623534 |
| 2018 | Hickory Dickory Dash | Tony Wilson | Laura Wood | Scholastic | 9781743623534 |
| 2019 | Alpacas with Maracas | Matt Cosgrove | Matt Cosgrove | Scholastic Australia | 9781743816349 |
| 2020 | Whitney and Britney Chicken Divas | Lucinda Gifford | Lucinda Gifford | Scholastic Australia | 9781760666507 |
| 2021 | Give Me Some Space! | Philip Bunting | Philip Bunting | Scholastic Australia | 9781338772753 |
| 2022 | Family Tree | Josh Pyke | Ronojoy Ghosh | Scholastic Australia | 9781761126307 |
| 2023 | The Speedy Sloth | Rebecca Young | Heath McKenzie | Scholastic Australia | 9781760974893 |
| 2024 | Bowerbird Blues | Aura Parker | Aura Parker | Scholastic Australia | 9781760269609 |
| 2025 | The Truck Cat | Deborah Frenkel | Danny Snell | Hardie Grant Children’s Publishing | 9781761440649 |
