= Sheena Knowles =

Australian children's book author

- Born: Geelong Victoria
- Citizenship: Canadian
- Occupation: Author
- Known for: Australia Author of Children books

Sheena Knowles is an Australian author of children's books.

Born in Geelong, Victoria, she currently lives in Victoria.

She is the author of the picture book Edward the Emu, which was illustrated by Rod Clement, and shortlisted for the 1989 Australian Children's Picture Book of the Year. A companion title, Edwina the Emu, was published in 1997. Edward the Emu was selected as the book read for Australia's 2001 National Simultaneous Storytime. It inspired a musical composition for narrator, oboe, clarinet, bassoon, percussion, and string quartet by Peter Webb. Knowles previously worked for Diversitat, a local non-profit organisation. In the 1980s and 1990s, she worked in advertising.

== Selected works ==
- Knowles, Sheena; Clement, Rod, 1961- (1997), Edwina the emu, Pymble, N.S.W Angus and Robertson, ISBN 978-0-207-18914-2
- Knowles, Sheena; Clement, Rod (2002), Edward and Edwina Emu, Cornstalk Publishing, ISBN 978-0-7322-7720-8
- Knowles, Sheena; Bentley, Jonathan, (illustrator.) (11 May 2022), What a lot of nonsense : a book of animals and anagrams, Angus & Robertson (published 2020), ISBN 978-1-4607-5615-7
