= The Very Cranky Bear =

Children's picture book by Australian author Nick Bland

- Author: Nick Bland
- Illustrator: Nick Bland
- Language: English
- Genre: Children's novel
- Published: 2008 (Scholastic Australia)
- Publication place: Australia
- Media type: Print (hardback)
- Pages: 24 (unpaginated)
- ISBN: 9781741691344
- OCLC: 233284293

The Very Cranky Bear is a 2008 children's picture book by Nick Bland. It is about four animal friends, Moose, Lion, Zebra, and Sheep, who enter a cave to get out of a rainstorm and disturb a bear.

== Publication history ==
- 2008, Australia, Scholastic Australia, ISBN 9781741691344
- 2009, United Kingdom, Hodder Childrens, ISBN 9780340989432
- 2011, Canada, Scholastic, ISBN 9781443107853
- 2014, USA, Orchard Books, ISBN 9780545612692
- 2020, Italy, as "Orso che broncio!", Caissa Italia, ISBN 9788867290963

== Reception ==
A review in Publishers Weekly of The Very Cranky Bear wrote "Using a singsong rhyme scheme and a comically bumbling animal cast, Bland (The Runaway Hug) playfully introduces the concepts of consideration and respect in a story first published in Australia in 2008", and Kirkus Reviews called it "Good, not-so-cranky fun."

The Very Cranky Bear has also been reviewed by CM: Canadian Review of Materials, Booklist, School Library Journal, The Horn Book, and Library Media Connection.

It was the 2012 National Simultaneous Storytime book.

== Adaptations ==
Cranky Bear, a theatrical adaption of The Very Cranky Bear, has been made by Patch Theatre.
