= I Got This Hat =

Book by Kate and Jol Temple

- Author: Kate Temple, Jol Temple
- Cover artist: Jon Foye
- Language: English
- Genre: Children's book
- Publisher: HarperCollins
- Publication date: September 2014
- Publication place: Australia
- Media type: Print and interactive book
- ISBN: 9780733332067

I Got This Hat is a children's book written by Kate and Jol Temple. It is illustrated by Jon Foye. The book is published by HarperCollins and is available in ABC Shops. It has been selected as the 2016 National Simultaneous Storytime book and was read by over 500,000 school students at the same time on May 25, 2016. The book has also been produced as an app with funding from the Australia Council for the Arts.
