= Willoughby's Magic Hat =

1943 film

- Directed by: Bob Wickersham
- Written by: Sam Cobean
- Produced by: Dave Fleischer
- Narrated by: John McLeish
- Music by: Paul Worth
- Animation by: Phil Duncan; Howard Swift
- Layouts by: Zack Schwartz (uncredited)
- Production company: Screen Gems
- Distributed by: Columbia Pictures
- Release date: April 20, 1943
- Country: United States
- Language: English

Willoughby's Magic Hat is a Phantasies animated short subject directed by Bob Wickersham, produced by Screen Gems, and released to theaters by Columbia Pictures on April 20, 1943. The short is the first of three to star Columbia's short-lived character Willoughby Wren.

== Synopsis ==
The short begins with a narrator explaining the origins of magical hat woven from the hair of Samson. Initially given as a present to the Greek god Hercules by Samson's girlfriend, the hat is said to grant the wearer unfathomable strength, but has repeatedly become lost through time after being stolen from the Greek god Atlas. Eventually, by the then-modern days of the 20th century, the hat would fall into the possession of a diminutive, weak man named Willoughby Wren, who immediately discovers his newfound strength.

Soon, Willoughby uses newfound powers to save a young woman from the clutches of an evil Frankenstein's monster-like robot, but finds that his powers vanish when the hat falls off or is removed from his head, which seems to happen often. Willoughby would eventually save the woman after being tied onto a trestle bridge with two locomotives coming from both sides.

As the two glide safely to the ground, the monster attempts to confront Willoughby again, but a single finger-tap was enough to fling it into a brick wall, reducing the monster into a pile of scrap metal. The monster, however, transforms into a tank-like vehicle and attacks Willoughby, only for Willoughby to tap the monster again, destroying it for good.

== Notes ==
The film is notable for its use of stylistic design and unusual camera angles, the influence of Screen Gem employees who had defected from Walt Disney Productions following the 1941 Disney animator's strike. The designer for Willoughby's Magic Hat, Zack Schwartz, later became one of the co-founders of United Productions of America (UPA), a company that specialized in experimental and avant-garde animated shorts.

Willoughby Wren would appear in two more cartoons following his debut: Magic Strength (1944) and Carnival Courage (1945), the latter of which was produced in Technicolor.
