= The Magic Hat =

Australian children's picture book by Mem Fox and Tricia Tusa

- Author: Mem Fox
- Illustrator: Tricia Tusa
- Cover artist: Tricia Tusa
- Language: English
- Genre: Children's picture book
- Published: 2002 (Scholastic Australia)
- Publication place: Australia
- Media type: Print (hardback)
- Pages: 32 (unpaginated)
- ISBN: 9781865044637
- OCLC: 861936952

The Magic Hat is a 2002 children's picture book by Mem Fox and illustrated by Tricia Tusa. It is about a wizard's hat that appears in a crowded park and alights on people's heads, turning them into various animals. Then, the hat's owner, a wizard, shows up and restores things back to normal.

== Reception ==
A review in Booklist of The Magic Hat wrote: "The bouncy rhyme is fun if undistinguished, but the artwork, in its oversize format, overflows with good humor". Books+Publishing found it "..a picture book about happiness that IS happy..".

The Magic Hat has also been reviewed by Kirkus Reviews, Publishers Weekly, School Library Journal, Horn Book Guides, Magpies,Magpies, and the Australian Book Review.

It was the chosen book for the 2007 National Simultaneous Storytime.
