= Totally Tooned In =

- Genre: Animation; Anthology
- Created by: Rob Word
- Narrated by: Steve Howey
- Theme music composer: Dana Walden
- Composer: Sydney Lehman
- Country of origin: United States
- Original language: English
- No. of seasons: 1
- No. of episodes: 65

Production
- Executive producer: Rob Word
- Producers: Phil May; Joseph Shields
- Running time: 22 minutes
- Production companies: Associated Images; Columbia TriStar International Television

Original release
- Network: Syndication (worldwide); Antenna TV (United States)
- Release: April 12, 1999 – February 17, 2000

Totally Tooned In is an American syndicated television animated cartoon compilation series consisting of theatrical cartoons from the animation studios Screen Gems and UPA. It was created and executive produced by Rob Word. The series was produced by Columbia TriStar International Television (now known as Sony Pictures Television) from 1999 to 2000 and broadcast in several international markets before making its American television debut on Antenna TV on January 8, 2011, where it continued to air until 2015. It began airing on MeTV Toons on June 30, 2024.

== Format ==
Each episode includes three full-length cartoons from the 1930s to the 1950s, including 52 out of the 53 theatrically distributed Mr. Magoo cartoons (13 episodes used repeats), and short clips from other cartoons. The cartoons were remastered from the original 35 mm movie film elements.

== Episodes ==
The cartoons with "*" are repeats.

No.	1st cartoon	2nd cartoon	3rd cartoon
1	Barefaced Flatfoot (Mr. Magoo)	Grape Nutty (The Fox and the Crow)	Glee Worms (The Bugz World)
2	Grizzly Golfer (Mr. Magoo)	Cat-Tastrophy (Color Rhapsody)	Mother Goose in Swingtime (Color Rhapsody)
3	Fuddy Duddy Buddy (Mr. Magoo)	Madeline (Jolly Frolics)	Merry Mannequins (Color Rhapsody)
4	Meet Mother Magoo (Mr. Magoo)	The Magic Fluke (The Fox and The Crow)	Giddyap (Jolly Frolics)
5	Destination Magoo (Mr. Magoo)	Christopher Crumpet (Jolly Frolics)	The Frog Pond; a.k.a. Panic in Frog Town (Color Rhapsody)
6	Bungled Bungalow (Mr. Magoo)	Tito's Guitar (Tito and Burrito)	The Miner's Daughter (Jolly Frolics)
7	When Magoo Flew (Mr. Magoo)	Toll Bridge Troubles (The Fox and The Crow)	The Family Circus (Jolly Frolics)
8	Magoo's Check-Up (Mr. Magoo)	In My Gondola (Scrappy)	The Kangaroo Kid (Color Rhapsody)
9	Magoo's Express (Mr. Magoo)	Bluebirds' Baby; a.k.a. Sparky in Happyland (Sparky)	Pickled Puss (Color Rhapsody)
10	Dog, Cat and Canary; a.k.a. Sweet Tweets (Flippy)	Madcap Magoo (Mr. Magoo)	Mother Hen's Holiday (Color Rhapsody)
11	Slay It with Flowers (The Fox and The Crow)	Dog Snatcher (Mr. Magoo)	Mountain Ears (Color Rhapsody)
12	Magoo's Canine Mutiny (Mr. Magoo)	Scary Crows (Sparky)	The Little Match Girl (Color Rhapsody)
13	Calling Dr. Magoo (Mr. Magoo)	Picnic Panic (Tito and Burrito)	Flora (Color Rhapsody)
14	Woodman, Spare That Tree (The Fox and The Crow)	Magoo's Puddle Jumper (Mr. Magoo)	Georgie and the Dragon (Jolly Frolics)
15	Magoo Goes West (Mr. Magoo)	Big House Blues (Flippy)	Boston Beanie (Color Rhapsody)
16	Magoo Beats the Heat (Mr. Magoo)	Fiesta Time (Tito and Burrito)	The Disillusioned Bluebird (Color Rhapsody)
17	Gerald McBoing Boing (Gerald McBoing Boing)	Loco Lobo (Color Rhapsody)	Fuddy Duddy Buddy* (Mr. Magoo)
18	Sloppy Jalopy (Mr. Magoo)	Punchy de Leon (The Fox and The Crow)	The Popcorn Story (Jolly Frolics)
19	Polar Playmates (Color Rhapsody)	Magoo Makes News (Mr. Magoo)	Football Bugs (The Bugz World)
20	The Fox and the Grapes (The Fox and The Crow)	Carnival Courage; a.k.a. Attack of Killer Gorilla (Color Rhapsody)	Grizzly Golfer* (Mr. Magoo)
21	Safety Spin (Mr. Magoo)	A Pee-Kool-Yar Sit-Chee-A-Shun (Li'l Abner)	Coo-Coo Bird Dog (Color Rhapsody)
22	Way Down Yonder in the Corn (The Fox and The Crow)	Magoo Goes Overboard (Mr. Magoo)	Jitterbug Knights (Color Rhapsody)
23	Gerald McBoing Boing's Symphony (Gerald McBoing Boing)	Lucky Pigs (Color Rhapsody)	Magoo's Cruise (Mr. Magoo)
24	Magoo's Glorious Fourth (Mr. Magoo)	Christopher Clumpet's Playmate (Jolly Frolics)	Nell's Yells (Color Rhapsody)
25	Room and Bored (The Fox and The Crow)	Mother Hubba-Hubba Hubbard (Color Rhapsody)	Meet Mother Magoo* (Mr. Magoo)
26	Red Riding Hood Rides Again (Color Rhapsody)	Hotsy Footsy (Mr. Magoo)	Crop Chasers (Color Rhapsody)
27	Midnight Frolics (Color Rhapsody)	Magoo's Masquerade (Mr. Magoo)	Skeleton Frolic (Color Rhapsody)
28	Mr. Moocher (The Fox and The Crow)	A Helping Paw (Color Rhapsody)	Magoo's Check-Up* (Mr. Magoo)
29	Merry Minstrel Magoo (Mr. Magoo)	Concerto in B Flat Minor (Color Rhapsody)	Swing, Monkey, Swing (Color Rhapsody)
30	How Now Boing Boing (Gerald McBoing Boing)	Up n' Atom (Color Rhapsody)	Bungled Bungalow* (Mr. Magoo)
31	Plenty Below Zero (The Fox and The Crow)	Magoo Goes Skiing (Mr. Magoo)	Gifts from the Air (Color Rhapsody)
32	Pink and Blue Blues (Mr. Magoo)	A Boy, a Gun, and Birds; a.k.a. Lethal Tweetment (Sparky)	Mr. Elephant Goes to Town (Color Rhapsody)
33	Robin Hoodlum (The Fox and The Crow)	Imagination (Color Rhapsody)	When Magoo Flew* (Mr. Magoo)
34	The Ragtime Bear (Mr. Magoo)	The Way of All Pests (The Bugz World)	Babes at Sea (Color Rhapsody)
35	Gerald McBoing Boing on Planet Moo (Gerald McBoing Boing)	The Happy Tots' Expedition; a.k.a. Expedition To The Lost Planet (Color Rhapsody)	Destination Magoo* (Mr. Magoo)
36	Spellbound Hound (Mr. Magoo)	The Merry Mutineers (Color Rhapsody)	The Air Hostess (Color Rhapsody)
37	Trailblazer Magoo (Mr. Magoo)	Leave Us Chase It (Phantasy)	Tom Thumb's Brother (Color Rhapsody)
38	Unsure Runts (The Fox and The Crow)	The Mad Hatter (Color Rhapsody)	Madcap Magoo* (Mr. Magoo)
39	Trouble Indemnity (Mr. Magoo)	Sadie Hawkins Day (Li'l Abner)	The Wise Owl; a.k.a. Top Bat and Tails (Color Rhapsody)
40	Treasure Jest (The Fox and The Crow)	Bon Bon Parade (Color Rhapsody)	Dog Snatcher* (Mr. Magoo)
41	Magoo Breaks Par (Mr. Magoo)	Doctor Bluebird; a.k.a. Scrappy In Happyland (Scrappy)	The Horse on the Merry-Go-Round (Color Rhapsody)
42	Magoo's Masterpiece (Mr. Magoo)	Amoozin But Confoozin' (Li'l Abner)	Peaceful Neightbors; a.k.a. Chick N' Fight (Color Rhapsody)
43	The Egg-Yegg (The Fox and The Crow)	Indian Serenade; a.k.a. Yippy the Snake Charmer (Color Rhapsody)	Magoo Goes West* (Mr. Magoo)
44	Magoo's Moose Hunt (Mr. Magoo)	Holiday Land (Color Rhapsody)	The Gorilla Hunt (Color Rhapsody)
45	Be Patient, Patient (The Fox and The Crow)	Swiss Tease (Color Rhapsody)	Calling Dr. Magoo* (Mr. Magoo)
46	Bwana Magoo (Mr. Magoo)	The Happy Tots; a.k.a. Hot and Happy (Color Rhapsody)	Willie the Kid (Jolly Frolics)
47	The Explosive Mr. Magoo (Mr. Magoo)	Professor Small and Mr. Tall (Color Rhapsody)	Spring Festival (Color Rhapsody)
48	Tree for Two (The Fox and The Crow)	Gumshoe Magoo (Mr. Magoo)	Ye Olde Swap Shoppe (Color Rhapsody)
49	Love Comes to Magoo (Mr. Magoo)	Cagey Bird (Flippy)	Cinderella Goes to a Party (Color Rhapsody)
50	Ku-Ku Nutz (The Fox and The Crow)	Kangaroo Courting (Mr. Magoo)	Snow Time (Color Rhapsody)
51	Captains Outrageous (Mr. Magoo)	Silent Tweetment (Flippy)	Little Boy With a Big Horn (Jolly Frolics)
52	The Dream Kids (The Fox and The Crow)	Magoo Saves the Bank (Mr. Magoo)	The Foolish Bunny; a.k.a. The Delinquent Rabbit (Color Rhapsody)
53	Magoo's Three Point Landing (Mr. Magoo)	Topsy Turkey (Phantasy)	The Untrained Seal (Color Rhapsody)
54	Matador Magoo (Mr. Magoo)	A Boy and His Dog; a.k.a. Attack of the Giant Puppy (Sparky)	Poor Elmer (Color Rhapsody)
55	Magoo's Lodge Brother (Mr. Magoo)	The Carpenters; a.k.a. The Hammer-Heads (Color Rhapsody)	The House That Jack Built (Color Rhapsody)
56	A Hunting We Won't Go (The Fox and The Crow)	Magoo's Private War (Mr. Magoo)	Little Rover (Color Rhapsody)
57	Magoo's Young Manhood (Mr. Magoo)	Poor Little Butterfly (Color Rhapsody)	The Novelty Shop (Color Rhapsody)
58	Magoo's Homecoming (Mr. Magoo)	Lo, The Poor Buffal (Color Rhapsody)	The Timid Pup (Color Rhapsody)
59	Phoney Baloney (The Fox and The Crow)	Rock Hound Magoo (Mr. Magoo)	Window Shopping (Color Rhapsody)
60	Magoo's Problem Child (Mr. Magoo)	The Foxy Pup (Color Rhapsody)	Animal Cracker Circus (Sparky)
61	Scoutmaster Magoo (Mr. Magoo)	Let's Go (The Bugz World)	Birds in Love (Color Rhapsody)
62	Foxy Flatfoots (The Fox and The Crow)	Make Believe Revue (Color Rhapsody)	Pink and Blue Blues* (Mr. Magoo)
63	Magoo Slept Here (Mr. Magoo)	Catnipped (Flippy)	The Shoemaker and the Elves (Color Rhapsody)
64	Tooth or Consequences (The Fox and The Crow)	Stage Door Magoo (Mr. Magoo)	A Cat, a Mouse and a Bell (Color Rhapsody)
65	Terror Faces Magoo (Mr. Magoo)	Porkuliar Piggy (Li'l Abner)	Uncultured Vulture (Phantasy)
