= Babes at Sea =

- Directed by: Arthur Davis
- Story by: Arthur Davis
- Produced by: Charles Mintz
- Music by: Joe DeNat
- Animation by: Sid Marcus
- Color process: Technicolor
- Production company: Screen Gems
- Distributed by: Columbia Pictures
- Release date: December 12, 1934
- Language: English

Babes at Sea is a 1934 Color Rhapsodies film.

== Plot summary ==
A toddler chases a frog out of his house to a nearby well where, falling into the bucket, he arrives at the bottom of the well, and is magically greeted by underwater sea babies and various creatures, including the octopus law officer. Eventually, he returns to the well bucket and is raised back up, where his mother saves him.
