= Make Believe Revue =

- Story by: Ben Harrison
- Produced by: Charles Mintz
- Music by: Joe DeNat
- Animation by: Manny Gould; Harry Love
- Color process: Cinecolor
- Production company: Screen Gems
- Distributed by: Columbia Pictures
- Release date: March 22, 1935
- Running time: 10 minutes
- Country: United States
- Language: English

Make Believe Revue is a 1935 Color Rhapsodies short produced by Screen Gems and distributed by Columbia Pictures.

== Summary ==
Flown away to the land of the story books, Jack and Jill, aided by Mother Goose, watch a fairyland revue complete with chorus girls and marching soldiers.
