= Goofy Gophers (film) =

- Directed by: Bob Clampett (planned); Arthur Davis (finished)
- Written by: Warren Foster
- Starring: Mel Blanc; Stan Freberg (unc.)
- Music by: Carl Stalling
- Animation by: Manny Gould; Don Williams; J.C. Melendez; Cal Dalton
- Layouts by: Thomas McKimson
- Backgrounds by: Philip DeGuard
- Color process: Technicolor
- Production company: Warner Bros. Cartoons
- Distributed by: Warner Bros. Pictures
- Release date: January 25, 1947
- Running time: 7:10
- Country: United States
- Language: English

Goofy Gophers is a 1947 Warner Bros. Looney Tunes cartoon directed by Bob Clampett and Arthur Davis. The short was released on January 25, 1947, and is the first appearance of the Goofy Gophers. It was reissued in 1955 as The Goofy Gophers, rendering the original film and credits lost to time. (Note: Despite being released in 1947, the short's copyright was in-notice in 1946 and was renewed under R566632. It will instead enter public domain based on that 1946 date in 2042.)

== Plot ==
An anthropomorphic dog who is based on John Barrymore is guarding a vegetable garden and falling asleep. However, the dog then spots two gophers eating carrots. The dog disguises himself as a tomato vine and poses as an actual plant in the garden. The Gophers spot the tomato vine, grab a bunch of vegetables, and throw a pumpkin on the dog before striking him with a spade. The gags are plenty as the Gophers continue to outwit their dog nemesis. Eventually, they launch the dog, via rocket, into outer space towards the Moon and now there are four crescent moons.

The Gophers, now triumphant, gloat that they will have all the carrots all to themselves. But suddenly, they hear a familiar carrot chomping noise and there stands Bugs Bunny who says the popular catchphrase from The Great Gildersleeve, "Well, now, I wouldn't say that!" as the cartoon ends.

== Notes ==
- Among some of the music cues heard throughout the short are:

- "Merrily We Roll Along" - Merrie Melodies theme music; heard when one of the gophers makes like Bugs Bunny.
- "The Wish That I Wish Tonight" - played prominently throughout the cartoon; especially when the Gophers gather vegetables while pulling the dog by his nose. This musical number is previously heard in Hare Remover and Kitty Kornered and would later be used again in Water, Water Every Hare.
- "Mysterious Mose"- A Latin-flavored version of the musical number plays as the vegetables disappear one-by-one. Commonly, this musical number plays during horror scenes in cartoons, particularly the 1930 Betty Boop cartoon of the same name from Fleischer Studios.
- "Minuet in G"- Played when the Gophers dance with the hand puppet.
- "Let's Sing a Song About Susie"- Played when the Gophers suggest what vegetables they should take next; also played when they prepare to launch the dog to the Moon via rocket launcher. The song also plays over the original titles of the cartoon.
- "Rock-a-Bye Baby"- Played when the Moon blows up into four crescents.

- This is one of a few cartoons that Bob Clampett had planned but didn't finish before he left the studio in 1945. Like this short, Bacall to Arms and The Big Snooze were finished by Arthur Davis, while Birth of a Notion was finished by Robert McKimson, alongside a planned Tweety cartoon that would eventually become Tweetie Pie by Friz Freleng.
  - For this cartoon, Clampett supervised the dialogue track before leaving, which Davis used to finish the cartoon as he found the voices to be "kind of cute".
- This marks the first appearance of the Goofy Gophers, who would appear in eight more shorts in the Golden Age of American Animation. This cartoon also marks the first appearance of an unnamed dog which would appear in only the first three Goofy Gophers cartoons: this one, Two Gophers from Texas and A Ham in a Role.

== Home media ==
This short is available on disc 1 of the Looney Tunes Collector's Vault: Volume 1 Blu-ray set.

== See also ==
- Bugs Bunny filmography
- Looney Tunes and Merrie Melodies filmography (1940–1949)
