= Two Guys from Texas =

1948 film by David Butler

- Directed by: David Butler; I. Freleng (Dream sequence, uncredited)
- Screenplay by: I.A.L. Diamond; Allen Boretz
- Based on: Howdy Stranger; 1937 play by Robert Sloane; Louis Pelletier
- Produced by: Alex Gottlieb
- Starring: Dennis Morgan; Jack Carson
- Cinematography: Arthur Edeson; William V. Skall
- Edited by: Irene Morra
- Music by: Leo F. Forbstein; Ray Heindorf (Orchestration)
- Color process: Technicolor
- Production company: Warner Bros. Pictures
- Distributed by: Warner Bros. Pictures
- Release date: September 4, 1948
- Running time: 86 minutes
- Country: United States
- Language: English
- Budget: $2,267,000
- Box office: $2,963,000

Two Guys from Texas is a 1948 American Western musical film starring longtime song-and-dance partners Dennis Morgan and Jack Carson. Directed by David Butler, it was written by Allen Boretz and I.A.L. Diamond, and features Dorothy Malone and Penny Edwards in support.

The picture was a follow-up to Morgan and Carson's previous 'road film', 1946's Two Guys from Milwaukee, one of Warner Bros.' efforts to capture some of the appeal of Paramount's highly successful Bing Crosby and Bob Hope Road pictures.

== Plot ==
Down-on-their-luck song-and-dance duo Steve Carroll and Danny Foster run out of gas in what seems like the middle of the Texas wilderness. Fortunately, a tony dude ranch is a short walk ahead. A chance meeting with an old friend, singer Maggie Reed, gets the boys a job there.

With their auto stolen and empty wallets, the two settle into ranch life as "house performers", sharing the stage there with Maggie. Danny and the pretty, perky blonde appear to have an eye for one-another. Inveterate womanizer Steve immediately puts his best moves on knockout ranch owner Joan Winston.

Danny has an uncontrollable fear of animals, which keeps cropping up everywhere he goes: big, small, live or stuffed, they all throw him into a panic. Steve sets up Danny with Dr. Straeger to get some analysis. Maggie warns Joan that Steve's a lothario, and not to fall for his tricks. Still, she does...hard enough to end up in a stressful tug-of-war with her emotions.

Meanwhile, a stout and homely middle-aged Indian woman keeps getting hold of Danny by the arm and trying to drag him off for "romance". He is lucky each time to escape.

Unfortunately for Steve, Straeger's prescription for Danny is that he must steal away one of Steve's girlfriends, as his fear of animals is merely a displaced fear of women. Danny sets himself to it, and makes surprising headway first time out with Joan.

One good kiss from her - that leads to a few from him - is enough: he's cured! But now has a new itch that needs scratching.

Along the way a couple of crooks staying at the ranch use the duo's stolen car for a getaway in a robbery, framing the songmen. Jailed, Steven and Danny escape, and set to clearing themselves.

This isn't easy, because the town sheriff, tall, handsome Tex Bennett, is Joan's beau; lathered up by Steve's advances toward her, he's hot on their trail.

The next day is the Big Rodeo, and the bandits press their luck by attempting to hold up its box office. Just evading Tex and his clambering posse, Danny ends up trapped atop a bucking bronco - and setting a new world's record for riding one. Before Tex can round Steve up, he spots the bandits and captures them in the act single-handedly. The townfolks' money is saved, and everything simmers down.

Realizing he's been bested, Tex gracefully bows out and surrenders Joan to Steve. Danny immediately turns to Maggie, expecting they can pick up where at least she had left off. Nothing doing! She's fallen for the gentlemanly hunk wearing the badge and pledged herself to him.

Left out, with no fear either of animals or women, Danny is crestfallen. Once again the persistent silo-sized squaw appears, tugging him by the arm. This time she manages to hang on, pointing him toward her gorgeous young daughter posing alluringly nearby, all curves and pouty lips.

In the blink of an eye Danny's in a clinch and the two are smooching up a storm. Credits roll before censors have to intervene.

== Cast ==
- Dennis Morgan as Steve Carroll
- Jack Carson as Danny Foster
- Dorothy Malone as Joan Winston
- Penny Edwards as Maggie Reed
- Forrest Tucker as 'Tex' Bennett
- Joan Rudolph as Mrs. Karen Walkers
- Fred Clark as Dr. Jack Straeger
- Gerald Mohr as Link Jessup
- John Alvin as Jim Crocker
- Andrew Tombes as The Texan
- Monte Blue as Pete Nash
- The Philharmonica Trio as Specialty Act
- Petra Silva as large American Indian woman.

== Production ==
=== Bugs Bunny cameo ===
The film is noted today for featuring an animated cameo appearance of hit Warner Bros. cartoon character Bugs Bunny, voiced by Mel Blanc. Friz Freleng, the studio's leading animation director, was assigned to direct an animated dream sequence in which Bugs gives some advice to a lovelorn caricature of Jack Carson.

Bugs would later have a similar cameo in 1949's My Dream Is Yours, also starring Carson, and one at the end of the 1972 Barbra Streisand hit What's Up, Doc?, though the latter was stock footage rather than newly created.

Animation historians have noted the similarities between the animated dream sequence in this film and the Looney Tunes cartoon Swooner Crooner (1944). The latter, directed by Friz Freleng's colleague Frank Tashlin, concerned Porky Pig trying to reacquire the female chickens of his farm from a Frank Sinatra-esque rooster, who is driving the chicks away from the farm.

The same year Two Guys from Texas was released, animation director Art Davis parodied the film's title with a Merrie Melodies cartoon called Two Gophers from Texas, starring Mac & Tosh, better known as the Goofy Gophers. The title was spoofed yet again for Freleng's 1956 cartoon Two Crows from Tacos.

== Reception ==
=== Box office ===
The film cost an estimated $2 million, and earned $2,350,000 in rentals in the US according to Variety. According to Warner Bros records, the film earned $2,566,000 domestically and $397,000 foreign.

== See also ==
- List of American films of 1948
