= The Shoemaker and the Elves (film) =

- Directed by: Arthur Davis
- Produced by: Charles Mintz
- Music by: Joe DeNat
- Animation by: Arthur Davis
- Color process: Technicolor
- Production company: Screen Gems
- Distributed by: Columbia Pictures
- Release date: January 20, 1935
- Country: United States
- Language: English

The Shoemaker and the Elves is a 1935 Color Rhapsodies short directed by Arthur Davis. It concerns a poor shoemaker who gives a little boy shelter from a storm.

== Plot summary ==
A homeless waif, staggering through a roaring snow storm, wanders into a small town and no one except a poor shoemaker will give the little boy shelter from the storm. That night, the elves come in with their equipment and material, and make a new supply of shoes for the old man.

In the morning, seeing what has happened, the old man tells the boy he has brought him luck, and can stay with him as his adopted son.
