= Gopher Broke (1958 film) =

- Title card
- Directed by: Robert McKimson
- Story by: Tedd Pierce
- Starring: Mel Blanc
- Edited by: Treg Brown
- Music by: John Seely
- Animation by: Warren Batchelder; Ted Bonnicksen; George Grandpre; Tom Ray
- Layouts by: Robert Gribbroek
- Backgrounds by: William Butler
- Color process: Technicolor
- Production company: Warner Bros. Cartoons
- Distributed by: Warner Bros. Pictures
- Release date: November 15, 1958
- Running time: 6 mins
- Language: English

Gopher Broke is a 1958 Warner Bros. Looney Tunes cartoon short directed by Robert McKimson. The cartoon was released on November 15, 1958, and features the Goofy Gophers and the Barnyard Dawg. The voices are performed by Mel Blanc. The title is a pun on the phrase "go for broke".

== Plot ==
The Goofy Gophers are about to harvest the vegetables on the farm when the farmhands beat them to the punch. Worried that their food source is being "vandalized," they follow the truck to the barn so they can recover what they consider to be their food. However, they spot the guard dog and realize that if he were to awaken and spot them stealing the vegetables, he would cause them trouble.

The Gophers spend most of the rest of the cartoon using psychological wear-down tactics to drive the dog insane and remove him as a threat to their well-being. A deadpan pig watches as the dog is repeatedly the victim of the Gophers' pranks, and can only shake his head as the dog's psyche is broken down. Meanwhile, the pooch tries to convince himself that all that is going on is nothing but a bad dream (consulting Sigmund Fraud and using sleeping pills to laugh off each attempt).

In the end, the Gophers get rid of their foe for good by tying a harness around the sleeping dog's belly, then attaching it to a weather balloon before launching it (getting a tear in it as it goes up), leaving them free to "raise their vegetables" into a long pipe leading from the barn to their burrow. Meanwhile, the balloon leaks out completely, and the dog awakens atop a light pole. After he wakes up and realizing his surroundings, the dog mentally snaps, then flaps his front legs up and down and begins to fly! The pig - confused about everything he has seen - goes to psychiatrist Dr. Cy Kosis for counseling. Dr. Cy Kosis tries to convince the pig that dogs cannot fly until he sees the dog flying by the window, and realizes he needs counseling himself (and joins his client on the couch).

== See also ==
- List of American films of 1958

Preceded by Lumber Jerks	Goofy Gophers cartoons 1958	Succeeded by Tease for Two
