= Fables (film series) =

1939–1942 animated film series

- Production company: Screen Gems
- Distributed by: Columbia Pictures
- Country: United States
- Language: English

Fables is a series of animated cartoons produced in black and white by the Screen Gems studio for Columbia Pictures from 1939 to 1942. The series, along with the Phantasy cartoons, were brought in to replace the Scrappy and Krazy Kat series although they would be featured in some cartoons. The series ended in 1942 after Frank Tashlin left the studio.

== Filmography ==
| No. | Title | Release date | Director | Character | Notes |
|---|---|---|---|---|---|
| 1 | Little Lost Sheep | October 6, 1939 | Allen Rose | Krazy Kat | First short in Fables series. |
| 2 | Park Your Baby | December 22, 1939 | Allen Rose | Scrappy | |
| 3 | Practice Makes Perfect | April 5, 1940 | Allen Rose | Scrappy | |
| 4 | Barnyard Babies | June 14, 1940 | Arthur Davis | | |
| 5 | The Pooch Parade | July 19, 1940 | Allen Rose | Scrappy | |
| 6 | A Peep in the Deep | August 23, 1940 | Allen Rose | Scrappy | |
| 7 | Farmer Tom Thumb | September 27, 1940 | Allen Rose | Tom Thumb | |
| 8 | Mouse Meets Lion | October 25, 1940 | Allen Rose | The Lion and the Mouse | |
| 9 | Paunch 'n Judy | December 13, 1940 | Manny Gould | | Features Characters from Mother Goose in Swingtime (1939). |
| 10 | The Streamlined Donkey | January 17, 1941 | Arthur Davis | | |
| 11 | It Happened to Crusoe | March 14, 1941 | Allen Rose | Robinson Crusoe | |
| 12 | Kitty Gets the Bird | June 13, 1941 | Allen Rose | Mouse and Cat | |
| 13 | Dumb Like a Fox | July 18, 1941 | Allen Rose | Foxhound, Pooch, Fox, Jack Beaver, Skunk | |
| 14 | Playing the Pied Piper | August 8, 1941 | Lou Lilly | Mouse and Cat | |
| 15 | The Great Cheese Mystery | October 27, 1941 | Arthur Davis | | |
| 16 | The Tangled Angler | December 26, 1941 | Frank Tashlin | Petey Pelican | |
| 17 | Under the Shedding Chestnut Tree | February 22, 1942 | Bob Wickersham | Petey Pelican | |
| 18 | Wolf Chases Pigs | April 20, 1942 | Bob Wickersham | Three Little Pigs, Big Bad Wolf | |
| 19 | The Bulldog and the Baby | July 3, 1942 | Alec Geiss | Butch Bulldog | Final short in Fables series. |
