= The Little Match Girl (1937 film) =

- Directed by: Arthur Davis; Sid Marcus
- Written by: Cal Howard & Sid Marcus
- Music by: Joe DeNat
- Animation by: Emery Hawkins
- Distributed by: Columbia Pictures
- Release date: November 5, 1937
- Country: United States

The Little Match Girl is a 1937 animated short film adapting Hans Christian Andersen's 1845 literary fairy tale The Little Match Girl. Part of the Color Rhapsody series, it was directed by Arthur Davis and Sid Marcus, produced by Charles Mintz and distributed by Columbia Pictures.

== Plot ==
The bells ring in the New Year and people are partying in the streets of New York. A poor little girl makes her living selling matches. It is winter, and the hustling crowds at best ignore her, and some are outright rude.

Eventually, she makes her way to a secluded alley and lights a candle to warm herself. As she does so, she dreams of comforts. It gets blown out; this happens again, then on the third try, she falls into a dream. In this dream, cherubs attend her in a wonderful, heavenly place. She gets a new doll, then a new dress. She sees visions of a Christmas tree, an adult angel playing the harp, and other wonderful sights.

The cherubs put her on a throne and give her flowers, and she cries with happiness. Suddenly, a storm comes and destroys everything: the harsh reality of winter catches up in her dreams, blowing away all the happiness the little girl dreamed up. She starts crawling towards a lit candle, using her last strength to keep warm, before the candle goes out, just as the little match girl succumbs to the harsh cold and collapses dead in the alleyway. The snow starts falling again and the camera pulls back, revealing the lifeless body of the little girl, lying in the snow.

The adult angel comes along, cradles the child's soul and takes her to Heaven, lifting her into the night sky, and eventually turning into a star. Then the bells that rang for the New Year during the overture begin to ring again.

== Production ==
The majority of the animation was done by Emery Hawkins.

== Reception and legacy ==
The film was nominated for the Academy Award for Best Short Subject (Cartoons) but lost to The Old Mill by Disney. A short contemporary review in The Film Daily labeled the short as "amateurishly executed". Steve Stanchfield, writing for Cartoon Research in 2016, described it as one of his favorite cartoons and as "surprisingly touching", and admired part of the background art, although criticizing the high amount of dissolve and wipe transitions.
