= Big House Blues (film) =

- Directed by: Howard Swift
- Written by: Roy Jenkins
- Starring: Bill Shaw
- Music by: Eddie Kilfeather
- Animation by: Grant Simmons; Jay Sarbry
- Color process: Technicolor
- Production company: Screen Gems
- Distributed by: Columbia Pictures
- Release date: March 6, 1947
- Country: United States
- Language: English

Big House Blues is a 1947 Flippy cartoon.

== Synopsis ==
Flippy the canary reads a book on crime, and sees his cage as a cell and himself as stir-crazy. He escapes, only to be pursued by his enemy, Flop, now a prison guard. Flippy later wakes up and finds out it was all a dream, only to beat up Flop.

== Television ==
This short appeared on Totally Tooned In episode 15 and on Toon In with Me on MeTV in February 2022.
