= Two Gophers from Texas =

- Directed by: Arthur Davis
- Story by: Bill Scott; Lloyd Turner
- Starring: Mel Blanc; Stan Freberg
- Music by: Carl Stalling
- Animation by: Don Williams; Basil Davidovich; J.C. Melendez; Emery Hawkins
- Layouts by: Don Smith
- Backgrounds by: Philip DeGuard
- Color process: Cinecolor (original issue); Technicolor (production, reissue)
- Production company: Warner Bros. Cartoons
- Distributed by: Warner Bros. Pictures; The Vitaphone Corporation
- Release date: January 17, 1948
- Running time: 6:49
- Language: English

Two Gophers from Texas is a 1948 Warner Bros. Merrie Melodies cartoon directed by Arthur Davis. It was released on January 17, 1948, and features the Goofy Gophers.

== Title ==
The title is a pun on Two Guys from Texas, a comedy released earlier that year from Warner Brothers, although the short has nothing to do with Texas.

== Plot ==
The Goofy Gophers take "Little Snookie" on a long walk up a hill...just before sending him down the other end.

An unnamed dog based on John Barrymore (who also appeared in The Goofy Gophers) is reading a book and decides to seek wild game, which happens to come in the form of the Goofy Gophers. After trying to get them through simple chasing, only to see the gophers dive into their hole and then overrun the hole and off a cliff, the dog (upside down, hanging off a tree) looks through his book and discovers four ways to get a gopher:

- No. 1: The canny hunter will remember that gophers possess an enormous curiosity concerning strange or unfamiliar objects: To this end, the dog places a spring with a punching glove attached to it in a chest. When the Gophers, after deciding to ignore the "Do Not Open until Xmas" sticker, open it, they "see" jewelry in it and take the chest with them. The dog takes the chest away from the Gophers and opens it, only to be punched below his chin, as he bounces like a pogo stick.
- No. 2: Gophers are quite fond of fresh vegetables which can therefore be used as bait that would attract them: The dog, knowing that the gophers are vegetarians, plants a row of radishes in the ground along with a turnip at the end of the row that is booby-trapped to an overhanging rock tied around a nearby tree, which the dog tests with a ball, triggering the trap successfully. Naturally, the Gophers pick up all of the radishes, and after initial trouble, take the turnip—but the trap is not triggered this time. The dog then holds the string, but triggers the trap and says to himself "Oh, No." before he is crushed.
- No. 3: The gopher is a sentimental little creature whose feelings may be played upon to your advantage: The dog, calling himself Snookie (a pun on Baby Snooks), places himself in a booby-trapped carriage, with his cries quickly noticed by the Gophers. After discovering the booby trap under the dog (which includes a handgun, rifle, bomb, and grenade), the Gophers push the carriage up a hill, and then release the carriage with the dog in it down the cliff on the other side, leaving the dog howling as he goes over several hills (we see a sign that reads "Next time try the train") and vertically down a second cliff, where he crashes. As the dog claims that the Gophers missed his inner strength, the dog then falls down, stiff as a board.
- No. 4: If all else fails (and it has), you must utilize the gophers' love of music: The dog begins playing what amounts to a one-man band of music, drawing the Gophers' attention as they start dancing to the music. The dog unsuccessfully tries to crush them with cymbals and a banjo that also doubles as a gun, but does drag them to the drums using a trombone. As the dog tries to crush the gophers on the drums, they evade him and the dog and Gophers end up in the piano, where the Gophers have the dog "trapped like a rat in a trap", as the Gophers then hop all over the piano keys. Hammers attached to various keys hit the dog in his rear end as the cartoon concludes with the dog regretting having ever read the book.

== Home media ==
- Laserdisc - The Golden Age of Looney Tunes Volume 4, Side 4: Cartoon All-Stars
- Blu-Ray - Looney Tunes Collector's Choice: Volume 1 (restored)

== Notes ==
- This cartoon was re-released into the Blue Ribbon Merrie Melodies program on March 31, 1956. It was also re-released in Technicolor.
