= Eddie Kilfeather =

American composer (1900–1950)

Edward Vincent (Eddie) Kilfeather (April 5, 1900, Portland, Oregon - January 13, 1950, Los Angeles, California) was a musical composer and arranger who worked at the Screen Gems animation studio.

Kilfeather was born in 1900 to Edward and Hannah Kilfeather and grew up in Portland, Oregon. His father was a well-known Democrat found guilty of jury bribing in 1898. The young Kilfeather hooked up with another Portlander, George Olsen, who had formed a band and was its pianist, conductor and arranger. The band headed south and in San Francisco when it was hired by Flo Ziegfeld in 1923 to come to New Year to play music for the show Kid Boots. Kilfeather co-wrote the song Goin' Home Blues for the show. Ziegfeld became enraged with the band after the opening of Whoopee! in 1928. While on the road in Pittsburgh, he fired Kilfeather and replaced him with a personal favorite. Olsen protested by having his musicians refuse to play for the replacement. Ziegfeld relented and gave Kilfeather his job back. The Olsen band quit when the week was over.

Kilfeather wrote a number of songs that Olsen recorded on RCA Records, including She's a Corn Fed Indiana Girl. (1926) He was so taken with the cornet playing of Bix Beiderbecke on a recording of Jazz Me Blues that he transcribed the notes and used it in Olsen's RCA Victor recording You'll Never Get to Heaven With Those Eyes.

He moved to Los Angeles in 1931 with the Olsen band and occasionally played with Sam Coslow's orchestra at the Roosevelt Hotel. He arrived at the Charles Mintz cartoon studio in 1937 and stayed after it was absorbed by Columbia in 1941. His first short was Merry Mannequins and he was involved in 64 cartoons through the release of Up N' Atom in 1947. He was the studio's musical director, sometimes working in conjunction with composer Paul Worth. A stroke forced Eddie to retire as the cartoon studio's musical director in 1946. He was replaced by Darrell Calker, who was working with the Walter Lantz studio at the time.

Kilfeather died in 1950, leaving behind his wife, the former Adelaide Robinson, who died in 1991, and a daughter, Mary Ellen.
