= Holiday Land =

- Directed by: Sid Marcus (uncredited)
- Story by: Sid Marcus
- Produced by: Charles Mintz
- Music by: Joe DeNat
- Animation by: Arthur Davis (as Art Davis)
- Color process: Technicolor
- Production company: Screen Gems
- Distributed by: Columbia Pictures
- Release date: November 9, 1934
- Running time: 8 minutes
- Language: English

Holiday Land, also known as Festival of Fun Days, is a 1934 American animated short film made by Screen Gems as the first in their Color Rhapsody series. It also features Screen Gems' current star, Scrappy, in his first color appearance.

The short was nominated at the 1934 Academy Awards for Academy Award for Best Animated Short Film but lost to The Tortoise and the Hare.

== Summary ==
Scrappy is awakened by his alarm clock, but does not want to get up and go to school. Tossing in his bed, he wishes that "today was a holiday". The wind blows pages off his wall calendar, which produce "holidays" in the forms of their mascots (Father Time, Santa Claus, the Easter Bunny, a Thanksgiving turkey, a Halloween witch, etc.). Scrappy enjoys various holiday celebrations until he is awakened by his mother's voice. He quickly makes his morning routine, dresses, and eats a hasty breakfast, before diving under his bedclothes to dream again.

== Cast ==
- Beatrice Hagen, Dorothy Compton and Mary Moder as Quartet
- Purv Pullen as whistling soloist and various characters

== See also ==
- Color Rhapsody
- Santa Claus in film
