= Porky Chops =

- Title card
- Directed by: Arthur Davis
- Story by: William Scott; Lloyd Turner
- Starring: Mel Blanc
- Music by: Carl Stalling
- Animation by: Don Williams; Emery Hawkins; Basil Davidovich; J.C. Melendez; Herman Cohen (uncredited)
- Layouts by: Don Smith
- Backgrounds by: Philip De Guard
- Color process: Technicolor
- Production company: Warner Bros. Cartoons
- Distributed by: Warner Bros. Pictures; The Vitaphone Corporation
- Release date: February 12, 1949 (U.S.)
- Running time: 6:56
- Language: English

Porky Chops is a 1949 Warner Bros. Looney Tunes cartoon directed by Arthur Davis. The short was released on February 12, 1949, and stars Porky Pig.

The short's name is a pun on "pork chops".

== Plot ==
The Hipster Squirrel is on vacation in the north woods, and decides to get some sleep. His sleep is disturbed by what he thinks at first is the noise of a woodpecker. Upon further investigation, the squirrel discovers that Porky Pig, whom he calls a "lumberjackson", is chopping his own tree. The squirrel zips open a door at the base of the tree and removes the blade off of Porky's axe then tosses it on Porky's head. While Porky goes away to get more axes, the squirrel covers the base of the tree with a sheet of metal, riveting it in and painting it to look like the tree. Porky comes back with a golf bag full of axes, and proceeds to chop, but the blades keep breaking. Unknown to him, the squirrel is handing Porky every available axe until he himself (the squirrel) becomes one, but he manages to stop Porky and demands he stops chopping that tree. But Porky's not through yet.

The squirrel is reading a newspaper, but he hears a sawing noise, looks outside, and sees Porky sawing the tree down. The squirrel pulls the saw to a smaller tree, and when Porky tries to saw back, he is sandwiched through the crack and launched in the air, landing in a pond. Porky then chases the squirrel up the tree, but is stopped by a limb placed by the squirrel, who then cuts the pig's suspenders making him fall. Almost immediately after, Porky is on the other side of the tree with a shotgun, and fires. He shoots the branch he's standing on, while the squirrel runs inside and hands him a fruit basket. Porky then falls due to the weight of the basket. The squirrel then runs down with a mattress, but intentionally places it next to where Porky ends up crashing. Porky is disoriented, and the squirrel squeezes two bananas he's holding in his face, giving him a funny-looking mustache.

The squirrel is convinced Porky is defeated, but is met by the shotgun held by the pig. A chase down the tree ensues, with Porky firing. Porky then shoots inside the log, but is met with some fierce growling, scaring him. Those growls turned out to be the squirrel imitating a bear, who scares Porky up a branch. The squirrel then goes back inside, laughing.

Porky tries one last scheme. He brings over a supply of dynamite sticks, which he places inside the tree, which the squirrel then puts into a log nearby. Porky lights the fuse, and it ends up blowing the hollow log, awakening a real bear, which scares both Porky and the squirrel. They both run away, allowing the bear to occupy the squirrel's tree, wearing his pajamas, and reading the newspaper.

== Staff notes ==
- J.C. Melendez, one of the shorts animators, is better known as Bill Melendez, who animated, produced and directed the Peanuts franchise on television, beginning with A Charlie Brown Christmas in 1965.
- William Scott, the co-writer, is best known for his work on various cartoons such as the early 1960s TV show Rocky and Bullwinkle, among others.

== See also ==
- Looney Tunes
- Looney Tunes and Merrie Melodies filmography (1940–1949)
- Porky Pig filmography
