= Lumber Jerks =

- Title card
- Directed by: Friz Freleng
- Story by: Warren Foster
- Starring: Mel Blanc; Stan Freberg (uncredited)
- Music by: Milt Franklyn
- Animation by: Virgil Ross; Arthur Davis; Manuel Perez; Harry Love (Effects)
- Layouts by: Hawley Pratt
- Backgrounds by: Richard H. Thomas
- Color process: Technicolor
- Production company: Warner Bros. Cartoons
- Distributed by: Warner Bros. Pictures; The Vitaphone Corporation
- Release date: June 25, 1955 (U.S.)
- Running time: 7:04
- Language: English

Lumber Jerks is a 1955 Warner Bros. Looney Tunes short directed by Friz Freleng. It was released on June 25, 1955, and features the Goofy Gophers. The title is a play on the words lumberjack and "jerk".

== Plot ==
While moving into a new tree, the Gophers find that the bulk of it has been cut down and taken away. They locate what they assume to be their tree amidst a batch of logs in the river, awaiting transport to a lumber mill. The two begin rowing their home back to the forest but, not only are they going the wrong way, but also the current overtakes them, sending them over a waterfall. With tremendous effort, the gophers manage to row back up the falls, but the exertion exhausts them and they fall asleep.

While sleeping, they are conveyed to the mill and taken inside. They are awakened by a saw slicing into their log; they become aware of the bizarre machinery and machinations designed to turn trees into artificial fireplace logs, toothpicks, and furniture. Indeed, the gophers assume their home will be transformed into furniture and, after failing to prevent this, they venture outside and witness various pieces being loaded into a truck.

They decide to siphon the gas out of the truck. The Goofy Gopher who sucks it through a rubber hose turns green in the process; the vehicle drives from the factory, hose still attached, leaving a trail of fuel which the two follow. Eventually, they see walking toward them two mill workers who were manning the truck. The gophers hide in the woods while the men walk by, carrying a jerry can. One of the men says "Are you sure you filled up before we left?" The other says "Yeah, I'm sure we filled up before we left".

With the truck unguarded, Mac and Tosh unload their furniture and stack it on top of the stump where their tree used to be. They sit in front of a TV discussing how much nicer their home is now, and comment that it will be even better once they install electricity.

== Censorship ==
On ABC and the former WB network, the scene of one of the Goofy Gophers siphoning gasoline out of the furniture delivery truck and getting poisoned after swallowing some by mistake was cut (so as not to inspire any copycat incidents).

== Cast ==
- Mel Blanc as Mac and Mill Workers

== Production notes ==
Lumber Jerks is the last Warner Bros. entry to use the 1946-1955 version of "The Merry-Go-Round Broke Down".
