= Flippy and Flop =

Flippy
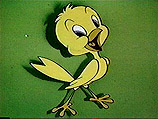
- Cropped still of Flippy from title card
- Directed by: Howard Swift; Bob Wickersham
- Starring: Harry E. Lang
- Production company: Screen Gems
- Distributed by: Columbia Pictures
- Running time: 6 minutes
- Country: United States
- Language: English

Flippy and Flop are a cartoon yellow canary and black-and-white cat duo that appeared in theatrical shorts from 1945 to 1947 by Screen Gems for Columbia Pictures. The canary and cat made their debut in 1945's Dog Cat and Canary.

Starting in 1946, Flippy and Flop would star in his own series starting in the short Catnipped.

== Biography ==
The antics of the two characters were similar to that of other cat-vs-canary cartoons commonly made at the time, but Flippy relies on Sam the household dog to protect him from Flop. The first cartoon of the series, the Color Rhapsody short Dog, Cat, and Canary (1945), was successful enough to be nominated for an Academy Award. Flippy and Flop appeared in four more cartoons before Screen Gems was replaced by United Productions of America in 1948, with Screen Gems' final cartoon releasing the following year. Their popularity never reached that of Columbia's biggest cartoon stars, The Fox and the Crow.

Following the release of Flippy and Flop's last cartoon Big House Blues in 1947, Warner Bros. Cartoons would release the Merrie Melodies short Tweetie Pie, the first cartoon to pair Tweety and Sylvester the Cat together and the first to redesign the titular character as a canary. The cartoon not only helped win the studio its first Academy Award, but also overshadow Flippy and Flop in popularity. Flippy (renamed "Flippity") and Flop would lived on only in comic books published by DC Comics until 1962.

== Voices ==
The characters were mostly voiced by Harry E. Lang. Flop and Sam also have a speaking role in Cagey Bird and Silent Tweetment by Frank Graham, and Flippy in the end of Big House Blues by Bill Shaw.

== Filmography ==
No.	Short	Director	Release	Series	Notes
1	Dog, Cat, and Canary	Howard Swift	January 5, 1945	Color Rhapsody	Nominated for an Academy Award for Best Short Film in 1944.
2	Catnipped	Bob Wickersham	February 14, 1946	Flippy	First cartoon of the Flippy series.
3	Cagey Bird	Howard Swift	July 18, 1946	Flippy	
4	Silent Tweetment	Bob Wickersham	September 19, 1946	Flippy	
5	Big House Blues	Howard Swift	March 6, 1947	Color Rhapsody	
