= A Ham in a Role =

1949 film by Robert McKimson

- Title card
- Directed by: Arthur Davis (uncredited); Robert McKimson
- Story by: Sid Marcus
- Starring: Mel Blanc (all other voices); Stan Freberg (Tosh); Dave Barry (Dog Gurgling Sounds)
- Music by: Carl Stalling
- Animation by: Charles McKimson; Phil DeLara; Bill Melendez; Emery Hawkins; Pete Burness
- Layouts by: Cornett Wood
- Backgrounds by: Richard H. Thomas
- Color process: Technicolor
- Production company: Warner Bros. Cartoons
- Distributed by: Warner Bros. Pictures; The Vitaphone Corporation
- Release date: December 31, 1949
- Running time: 6:49
- Language: English

A Ham in a Role is a 1949 Looney Tunes short starring the Goofy Gophers along with an unnamed dog who is based on stage/film actor John Barrymore. The cartoon was planned by Arthur Davis, but was finished and directed by Robert McKimson. It was released by Warner Bros. Pictures on December 31, 1949, but some sources list the release date as January 1, 1950. The cartoon draws heavily from the works of William Shakespeare, with its gags relying on literal interpretations of lines from Hamlet, Julius Caesar, Richard III, and Romeo and Juliet.

A Ham in a Role was the last cartoon in the Golden Age of American Animation to star the dog that had opposed the Gophers in their first two appearances. (The dog was recycled for a single short in the 1990s in the World Premiere Toons series.)

== Plot ==
An anthropomorphic dog is tired of appearing in cartoons and goes home to study the works of Shakespeare. Upon arriving back home, the dog finds that his home has been invaded by gophers. Unfazed, the dog then begins reading Hamlet. Upon discovering the Goofy Gophers sleeping in the book, he throws the book out the window.

The Goofy Gophers then decide to get back at the dog by literally interpreting lines from Shakespeare's works, including "lending him ears", by rolling a curtain up to annoy him, tormenting him with flames (to his foot), dousing him with "the joy of life" (by dumping a tub of water into the dog), dumping limburger cheese as the dog utters the "that which we call a rose by any other name" line while holding a rose, imitating the exhumed Yorick in a dance (making the dog appear like a Shakespearean coward), using magnets on the floor and ceiling to toss and carry the dog around the room (in armor), with the coup de grâce coming about when the Gophers use a horse to kick the dog out of his house, after he says "A horse, a horse, my kingdom for a horse!" and back to the studio, where the dog decides to finish what he started.

== Notes ==
This cartoon was originally issued as a Looney Tunes cartoon with the Looney Tunes music. When it was re-issued in 1959, the cartoon was re-issued with Merrie Melodies credits, but retained the Looney Tunes music.

Arthur Davis originally planned to direct the short, however the short was left unfinished due to his unit dissolving during production in November 1947, the same month when voice recording was taking place. Robert McKimson was able to finish the short by 1949, as well as inheriting two of Davis' animators, Bill Melendez and Emery Hawkins.

This is either the last Looney Tune of the 40s, or the first Looney Tune of the 50s (sources differ).

== Reception ==
Artist and writer Lia Abbate writes, "A Ham in a Role certainly wins a place among the best of them for the sheer amount of highbrow entertainment and lowbrow slapstick it packs into its short length, and the brilliant way in which these opposing dynamics match up. In the cartoon's standard running time of six minutes, we are treated to a greatest hits of William Shakespeare with no less than ten of his best quotations. And for each spate of speechifying, there is an equal moment — more, really — of inspired physical gags... You don't have to know a word of Shakespeare to enjoy all this great slapstick. Nevertheless, if you do, you'll be delighted to find that A Ham in a Role truly is an appreciation of what we Shakespeare lovers cherish the most: his words."

== References to Shakespeare ==
- Hamlet – Act 3, Scene 1
- Julius Caesar – Act 3, Scene 2
- Hamlet – Act 1, Scene 5
- Romeo and Juliet – Act 2, Scene 2
- Hamlet – Act 5, Scene 1
- Hamlet – Act 1, Scene 5
- Julius Caesar – Act 2, Scene 2
- Richard III – Act 5, Scene 3
- Richard III – Act 5, Scene 4
- Romeo and Juliet – Act 2, Scene 2
- Hamlet – Act 3, Scene 1

== Home media ==
- DVD - Looney Tunes Golden Collection: Volume 6, Disc 1 (with original cards)
- Blu-ray - Looney Tunes Platinum Collection: Volume 3, Disc 1
- DVD - My Dream Is Yours
