= Scrappy (cartoon character) =

Cartoon character

- First appearance: "Yelp Wanted"; July 16, 1931
- Last appearance: "The Little Theatre"; February 7, 1941
- Created by: Dick Huemer
- Voiced by: Dick Huemer (1931–1933); Leone LeDoux (1935–1940); Sara Berner (1940–1941)

In-universe information
- Species: Human
- Gender: Male

Scrappy is a cartoon character created by Dick Huemer for Charles Mintz's Screen Gems studio (distributed by Columbia Pictures). A little round-headed boy, Scrappy often found himself involved in off-beat neighborhood adventures. Usually paired with his little brother Oopy (originally Vontzy), Scrappy also had an on-again, off-again girlfriend named Margy and a Scotty dog named Yippy. In later shorts the annoying little girl Brat and pesky pet Petey Parrot also appeared.

== History ==
Huemer created the character in 1931, and he remained aboard Mintz's studio until 1933. With Huemer's departure, his colleagues Sid Marcus and Arthur Davis assumed control of the series. The final regular entry in the series, Scrappy's Rodeo, was released in 1939. Scrappy would continue to appear in the Phantasies and Fables series. The final cartoon featuring Scrappy, The Little Theatre, was released on February 7, 1941. Scrappy's cartoons were later reissued on 8mm and 16mm home movie formats throughout the 40s and 50s, and in 1953 Columbia's television division, coincidentally also named Screen Gems, began offering a television syndication package of Scrappy's shorts, which remained available as late as 1965. On January 1, 2027, the first six Scrappy short films will be in the public domain in United States.

== Shorts ==
=== 1930s ===
==== 1931 ====
No.	Title	Release date	Director	Film if in the public domain
1	Yelp Wanted	July 16, 1931	Dick Huemer	
Scrappy's dog, Yippy, is not feeling well. Scrappy sees a sign for Dr. Woof's Dog Tonic and thinks that's just the thing, but in order to get there, he has to pass through Rough House Alley. To protect his only coin, he puts it in his mouth, accidentally swallowing it; it is jarred loose, only to roll under a lady's skirt, pointedly avoid rolling down a grate, and land in a blind beggar's cup. To remove it, Scrappy whistles, and the eagle on the coin flies out, bringing the coin back to Scrappy. He buys the tonic, then runs into bullies, a cop, and bullies dressed as a cop; the tonic falls into a pond, gets eaten by a duck, and comes out inside an egg, with a separate tiny egg for the cork. Finally, Scrappy gets home, only to break the bottle just outside the dog house, but Yippy is feeling fine now and so are his new puppies. Other appearances: Yippy, Bullies, Police Notes: Scrappy's first appearance. The first short in the Scrappy cartoon series. The first appearance of Scrappy's dog "Yippy".
2	The Little Pest	August 15, 1931	Dick Huemer	
Scrappy and his dog Yippy start out for a fishing trip, but Oopy keeps tagging along, no matter how many times he is chased off. Finally believing he has left, they arrive at their spot at the lake, to find Oopy's beat them to it. From there they each try to out-fish each other, though the ornery fish seem to outsmart them most of the time. Other appearances: Yippy, Oopy, Worm, Fish Notes: The first appearance of Scrappy's brother "Oopy".
3	Sunday Clothes	September 15, 1931	Dick Huemer	
Scrappy gets himself into all kinds of trouble on his way to Sunday school. Other appearances: Yippy, Dogs, Bullies
4	The Dog Snatcher	October 16, 1931	Dick Huemer	
Scrappy tries to rescue his dog, Yippy from a mean dog catcher. Other appearances: Dog catcher, Yippy
5	Showing Off	November 11, 1931	Dick Huemer	
Scrappy tries to impress a girl (Margy) by smoking a cigar made out of cabbage, but he only succeeds in accidentally swallowing the cigar and setting her panties on fire. Other appearances: Margy Notes: The first appearance of Scrappy's on-again, off-again girlfriend "Margy".
6	Minding the Baby	November 16, 1931	Dick Huemer	
Scrappy gets a buffalo nickel to mind bratty baby Oscar, but quickly finds that the job is not worth it. Other appearances: Oscar

==== 1932 ====
No.	Title	Release date	Director	Film if in the public domain	Notes
7	The Chinatown Mystery	January 4, 1932	Dick Huemer		
8	The Treasure Runt	February 25, 1932	Dick Huemer		
9	Railroad Wretch	March 31, 1932	Dick Huemer		
10	The Pet Shop	April 28, 1932	Dick Huemer		
11	Stepping Stones	May 17, 1932	Dick Huemer		
12	Battle of the Barn	May 31, 1932	Dick Huemer		
13	Fare Play	July 2, 1932	Dick Huemer		
14	Camping Out	August 10, 1932	Dick Huemer		
15	The Black Sheep	September 17, 1932	Dick Huemer		
16	The Great Bird Mystery	October 20, 1932	Dick Huemer		
17	Flop House	November 9, 1932	Dick Huemer		
18	The Bad Genius	December 1, 1932	Dick Huemer		
19	The Wolf at the Door	December 29, 1932	Dick Huemer		

==== 1933 ====
No.	Title	Release date	Director	Film if in the public domain	Notes
20	Sassy Cats	January 25, 1933	Dick Huemer		
21	Scrappy's Party	February 13, 1933			
22	The Beer Parade	March 4, 1933			
23	The False Alarm	April 22, 1933			
24	The Match Kid	May 9, 1933	Sid Marcus		
25	Technoracket	May 20, 1933	Sid Marcus		
26	The World's Affair	June 5, 1933	Sid Marcus		
27	Movie Struck	September 8, 1933	Sid Marcus		
28	Sandman Tales	October 6, 1933	Sid Marcus		
29	Hollywood Babies	November 10, 1933	Sid Marcus		
30	Scrappy's Auto Show	December 8, 1933	Sid Marcus		

==== 1934 ====
No.	Title	Release date	Director	Distributor	Film if in the public domain	Notes
31	Scrappy's Art Gallery	January 12, 1934	Sid Marcus	Columbia Pictures		
32	Scrappy's Television	January 29, 1934	Sid Marcus	Columbia Pictures		
33	Aw Nurse	March 9, 1934	Sid Marcus	Columbia Pictures		
34	Scrappy's Toy Shop	April 13, 1934	Sid Marcus	Columbia Pictures		
35	Scrappy's Dog Show	May 18, 1934	Sid Marcus	Columbia Pictures		
36	Scrappy's Theme Song	June 15, 1934	Sid Marcus	Columbia Pictures		
37	Scrappy's Relay Race	July 7, 1934	Sid Marcus	Columbia Pictures		
38	The Great Experiment	July 27, 1934	Sid Marcus	Columbia Pictures		
39	Scrappy's Expedition	August 27, 1934	Sid Marcus	Columbia Pictures		
40	The Concert Kid	November 2, 1934	Sid Marcus	Columbia Pictures		
41	Holiday Land	November 9, 1934	Sid Marcus	Columbia Pictures		A Color Rhapsody cartoon. Scrappy's first appearance in color.
42	The Happy Butterfly	December 20, 1934	Sid Marcus	Columbia Pictures		

==== 1935 ====
No.	Title	Release date	Director	Distributor	Film if in the public domain	Notes
43	The Gloom Chasers	January 18, 1935	Arthur Davis	Columbia Pictures		
44	The Gold Getters	March 1, 1935	Sid Marcus	Columbia Pictures		
45	Graduation Exercises	April 12, 1935	Ben Harrison	Columbia Pictures		
46	Scrappy's Ghost Story	May 24, 1935	Ben Harrison	Columbia Pictures		
47	The Puppet Murder Case	June 21, 1935	Arthur Davis	Columbia Pictures		
48	Scrappy's Big Moment	July 28, 1935	Ben Harrison	Columbia Pictures		
49	Scrappy's Trailer	August 29, 1935	Ben Harrison	Columbia Pictures		
50	Let's Ring Doorbells	November 7, 1935	Arthur Davis	Columbia Pictures		

==== 1936 ====
No.	Title	Release date	Director	Distributor	Film if in the public domain	Notes
51	Scrappy's Boy Scouts	January 2, 1936	Arthur Davis	Columbia Pictures		
52	Doctor Bluebird	February 5, 1936	Ben Harrison	Columbia Pictures		A Color Rhapsody cartoon.
53	Scrappy's Pony	March 16, 1936	Ben Harrison	Columbia Pictures		
54	Scrappy's Camera Troubles	June 5, 1936	Ben Harrison	Columbia Pictures		
55	Playing Politics	July 8, 1936	Allen Rose	Columbia Pictures		
56	In My Gondola	September 3, 1936	Sid Marcus	Columbia Pictures		A Color Rhapsody cartoon.
57	Looney Balloonists	September 24, 1936	Allen Rose	Columbia Pictures		
58	The Merry Mutineers	October 2, 1936	Ben Harrison	Columbia Pictures		A Color Rhapsody cartoon.
59	Dizzy Ducks	November 28, 1936	Arthur Davis	Columbia Pictures		

==== 1937 ====
No.	Title	Release date	Director	Distributor	Film if in the public domain	Notes
60	Puttin' Out the Kitten	March 26, 1937	Arthur Davis	Columbia Pictures		
61	Scrappy's Band Concert	April 29, 1937	Allen Rose	Columbia Pictures		
62	Scrappy's Music Lesson	June 4, 1937	Arthur Davis	Columbia Pictures		
63	I Want to Be an Actress	July 18, 1937	Allen Rose	Columbia Pictures		
64	Canine Capers	September 16, 1937	Allen Rose	Columbia Pictures		
65	The Fire Plug	October 16, 1937	Allen Rose	Columbia Pictures		
66	The Clock Goes Round and Round	November 6, 1937	Arthur Davis	Columbia Pictures		
67	Scrappy's News Flashes	December 8, 1937	Allen Rose	Columbia Pictures		

==== 1938 ====
No.	Title	Release date	Director	Distributor	Film if in the public domain	Notes
68	The New Homestead	January 7, 1938	Arthur Davis	Columbia Pictures		
69	Scrappy's Trip to Mars	February 4, 1938	Allen Rose	Columbia Pictures		
70	Scrappy's Playmates	March 27, 1938	Arthur Davis	Columbia Pictures		
71	The City Slicker	July 8, 1938	Allen Rose	Columbia Pictures		
72	The Early Bird	September 16, 1938	Arthur Davis	Columbia Pictures		
73	Happy Birthday	October 7, 1938	Allen Rose	Columbia Pictures		

==== 1939 ====
No.	Title	Release date	Director	Distributor	Film if in the public domain	Notes
74	Scrappy's Added Attraction	January 13, 1939	Arthur Davis	Columbia Pictures		
75	Scrappy's Side Show	March 3, 1939	Allen Rose	Columbia Pictures		
76	A Worm's Eye View	April 28, 1939	Arthur Davis	Columbia Pictures		
77	Scrappy's Rodeo	June 2, 1939	Allen Rose	Columbia Pictures		The final short in the Scrappy cartoon series.
78	The Charm Bracelet	September 1, 1939	Allen Rose	Columbia Pictures		A Phantasy cartoon.
79	Millionaire Hobo	November 24, 1939	Arthur Davis	Columbia Pictures		A Phantasy cartoon.
80	Park Your Baby	December 22, 1939	Allen Rose	Columbia Pictures		A Fable cartoon.

=== 1940s ===
==== 1940 ====
No.	Title	Release date	Director	Distributor	Film if in the public domain	Notes
81	Man of Tin	February 23, 1940	Allen Rose	Columbia Pictures		A Phantasy cartoon.
82	Practice Makes Perfect	April 5, 1940	Allen Rose	Columbia Pictures		A Fable cartoon.
83	Fish Follies	May 10, 1940	Allen Rose	Columbia Pictures		A Phantasy cartoon.
84	The Pooch Parade	July 19, 1940	Allen Rose	Columbia Pictures		A Fable cartoon.
85	A Peep In The Deep	August 23, 1940	Allen Rose	Columbia Pictures		A Fable cartoon.
86	School Boy Dreams	September 24, 1940	Allen Rose	Columbia Pictures		A Phantasy cartoon.

==== 1941 ====
No.	Title	Release date	Director	Distributor	Film if in the public domain	Notes
87	The Little Theatre	February 7, 1941	Allen Rose	Columbia Pictures		A Phantasy cartoon. Scrappy's final appearance.
