= Goofy Gophers =

Warner Bros. theatrical cartoon character

The Goofy Gophers
- Looney Tunes/Merrie Melodies characters
- The Goofy Gophers in the short I Gopher You.
- First appearance: Goofy Gophers (1947)
- Created by: Bob Clampett; Arthur Davis
- Designed by: Don Williams (1947); Don Smith (1948); Cornett Wood (1949); Hawley Pratt (1949–1955); Jessica Borustki (2010–2014); Luis Gadea (2022–present)
- Voiced by: Mac: Mel Blanc (1947–1965); Jeff Bennett (1998); Rob Paulsen (2003–2015); Jeff Bergman (2019); Max Mittelman (2022–present); Tosh: Stan Freberg (1947–1958); Mel Blanc (1965); Corey Burton (1998); Jess Harnell (2003–2015); Matt Craig (2019); Noshir Dalal (2022–present)
- Developed by: Arthur Davis; Friz Freleng; Robert McKimson

In-universe information
- Species: Gophers; Squirrels (comics)
- Gender: Both males
- Nationality: British

The Goofy Gophers are animated cartoon characters in Warner Bros.' Looney Tunes and Merrie Melodies series of cartoons. The gophers are small and brown with tan bellies and buck teeth. They both have British accents. Unnamed in the theatrical cartoons, they were given the names Mac and Tosh in the 1960s TV show The Bugs Bunny Show. The names are a pun on the surname "Macintosh". They are characterized by an abnormally high level of politeness.

== Creation ==
The Goofy Gophers were created by Warners animator Bob Clampett for the 1947 short film of the same name. Norman McCabe had previously used a pair of gophers in his 1942 short Gopher Goofy, but they bear little resemblance to Clampett's characters. Clampett left the studio before animation production on the short ever started. After Arthur Davis took over production, he overhauled the entire film save for the voice track recorded before Clampett left. The cartoon features the gophers' repeated incursions into a vegetable garden guarded by an unnamed dog whom they relentlessly, though politely, torment. Voice actor Mel Blanc plays Mac and Stan Freberg plays Tosh. Both speak with high-pitched British accents like those used in upper-class stereotypes around at the time.

The pair's dialogue is peppered with such overpoliteness as "Indubitably!", "You first, my dear," and "But, no, no, no. It must be you who goes first!" The two often also tend to quote Shakespeare and use humorous elocution; for example, in Lumber Jerks, they say "We must take vital steps to reclaim our property," rather than use what some may consider to be a simpler phrase. Clampett later stated that the gophers' mannerisms were derived from character actors Franklin Pangborn and Edward Everett Horton.

== Development ==
Arthur Davis would direct one other Goofy Gophers short, 1948's Two Gophers from Texas. Davis redesigned both gophers, colored them brown and updated their characterization to distinguish the two. The unnamed dog would also be redesigned on all of his appearances.

Davis planned to direct a third short with the gophers before his unit was shut down in late 1949. Robert McKimson however, would complete the cartoon as A Ham in a Role.

The Gophers lay dormant for two years until Friz Freleng made a series of four shorts beginning with 1951's A Bone for a Bone, another dog-versus-gophers short. This was followed by I Gopher You in 1954, featuring the Gophers in their first cartoon without the dog, attempting to retrieve their vegetables from a food processing plant; Pests for Guests in 1955, which has the gophers counter-antagonize the hapless Elmer Fudd when he buys a chest of drawers that they found appropriate for nut storage; and Lumber Jerks later that year, where the Gophers visit a saw mill in an attempt to retrieve their stolen tree home.

After Freleng finished with the characters, they would star in two more cartoons, once again directed by McKimson. These two cartoons, Gopher Broke in 1958 and Tease for Two in 1965, pit the Gophers against the Barnyard Dawg and Daffy Duck, respectively. Both gophers were voiced by Mel Blanc in the latter short instead of one by Blanc and the other by Freberg.

== Later appearances ==
The Goofy Gophers were largely forgotten by Warner Bros. in the years since the animation studio closed in 1969. However, in recent years, they have made a few cameos in various Warner Bros. projects. Two characters resembling the gophers appeared in the 1988 film Who Framed Roger Rabbit, peeking from the brick wall into the factory where Judge Doom was defeated. They are briefly seen in the 1996 film Space Jam. They're prominently featured in episodes of the animated series The Sylvester and Tweety Mysteries ("I Gopher You") and Duck Dodgers ("K-9 Kaddy" and "Old McDodgers"), the latter of which sees them reinvented as green-furred, six-limbed Martian gophers.

The Goofy Gophers made a cameo appearance in the 2006 direct-to-video film Bah, Humduck! A Looney Tunes Christmas as Daffy's employers.

The Goofy Gophers were revived in The Looney Tunes Show voiced by Rob Paulsen and Jess Harnell. In this show, Mac and Tosh run an antique store. The gophers appeared in the 2015 DTV movie Looney Tunes: Rabbits Run. They also appear in the Looney Tunes comics currently published by DC Comics.

The Goofy Gophers appeared in the New Looney Tunes season 3 episode "Fool's Gold".

The Goofy Gophers made a cameo in the Looney Tunes Cartoons short "Happy Birthday, Bugs Bunny!"

The Goofy Gophers appeared in Bugs Bunny Builders in the episode "Rock On".

The Goofy Gophers made a cameo in the 2026 film Coyote vs. Acme.

== Filmography ==
- Goofy Gophers (1947, Bob Clampett & Arthur Davis)
- Two Gophers from Texas (1948, Davis)
- A Ham in a Role (1949, Davis & Robert McKimson)
- A Bone for a Bone (1951, Friz Freleng)
- I Gopher You (1954, Freleng)
- Pests for Guests (1955, Freleng)
- Lumber Jerks (1955, Freleng)
- Gopher Broke (1958, McKimson)
- Tease for Two (1965, McKimson)

== See also ==
- Alphonse and Gaston
- Chip 'n' Dale
