= Bacall to Arms =

1946 film by Bob Clampett

- Title card
- Directed by: Bob Clampett; Arthur Davis (both uncredited)
- Music by: Carl Stalling
- Animation by: Manny Gould; Rod Scribner; Don Williams; I. Ellis
- Layouts by: Thomas McKimson
- Backgrounds by: Philip DeGuard
- Color process: Technicolor
- Production company: Warner Bros. Cartoons
- Distributed by: Warner Bros. Pictures
- Release date: August 3, 1946
- Running time: 6:11
- Language: English

Bacall to Arms is a 1946 Warner Bros. Merrie Melodies short planned by Bob Clampett and finished by Arthur Davis, in the former's second-to-last cartoon at Warner Bros. The short was released on August 3, 1946.

The title is a play on the phrase "a call to arms" that references actress Lauren Bacall, whose acclaimed 1944 film debut was in To Have and Have Not, based on Hemingway's 1937 novel.

== Plot ==
The cartoon is set in a movie theater. Various random gags occur before the film, such as one patron moving to another seat, another patron taking the vacated seat, and so on, accelerating into a free-for-all. A wolf makes a pass at a sexy movie usherette, gets slapped in the face, then settles down for the show. While the theater is in color, the films-within-the film are black-and-white. A short "newsreel" is narrated by Robert C. Bruce.

The main feature is a film called To Have- To Have- To Have- ..., a parody of To Have and Have Not. It includes images of Humphrey Bogart and Lauren Bacall, who are credited as "Bogey Gocart and Laurie Bee Cool". In addition to recreating a few well-known scenes from that film (the kissing scene; the "put your lips together and blow" scene), the players sometimes lapse into slapstick (Bacall lighting her cigarette with a blowtorch à la Harpo Marx; or letting loose with a loud, shrill whistle after her famous sultry comment) and interact with the theater audience.

Although the theater was initially full, it is eventually seen to be empty except for one patron: a literal lone wolf in a zoot suit who falls head-over-heels for Bee Cool (presumably paying homage to Tex Avery's wolf character at MGM). The final gag has the wolf grabbing a cigarette that Bee Cool flicks into the theater, resulting in Bogie shooting him. He takes the cigar from the wolf, which explodes, covering his face in ash that resembles him wearing "blackface". Bogie adopts a Rochester voice and says, "My, oh my! I can work for Mr. Benny now!"

== Analysis ==
The film reuses animation from an earlier short, She Was an Acrobat's Daughter (1937) by Friz Freleng. Like its 1930s predecessor, the film depicts a noisy movie audience member which disrupts the screening. In this case the noisy audience is represented by the wolf-whistling and howling of a wolf in the audience. The film uses caricatures of Humphrey Bogart and Lauren Bacall, who attempt to act out the scene from To Have and Have Not (1944) in which they first kiss, and her character's advice on how to whistle. Bogart eventually shoots the disruptive wolf from the movie screen, though the film within a film never properly ends. The short is one of two parodies of Bogart from the Warner Bros. Cartoons studio. The other was Slick Hare (1947), where restaurant customer Bogart demands "fried rabbit" from Elmer Fudd, setting up a plot where he chases after Bugs Bunny.

The film functions as a tribute to Bacall and her sexual attractiveness. It was probably produced to promote the release of an upcoming feature film, The Big Sleep (1946). The film conflates two scenes from To Have and Have Not, the scene where the protagonist are introduced to each other and the whistle scene. In the original film, Bogart cleans a fishing reel. In the parody, he cleans a .45 caliber handgun. In a reference to Bacall's "hotness", when her caricature crosses the floor, she leaves a trail of flames behind her. While the film within a film is black and white, the flames are red and yellow. When she asks for a light, the Bogart caricature offers her a blow torch. She easily catches it and uses the torch to light her cigarette.

The distinctive voice of Eddie "Rochester" Anderson is used here to accompany a blackface-related visual gag. Christopher Lehman notes that it was typical for blackface gags in animated films to make references to well-known African American actors. References to both Anderson and Stepin Fetchit were frequently used. He notes, however, that the creators of Warner Bros. Cartoons found comedic use for Anderson's voice and ethnicity, but never for the intelligence or wit of his character, Rochester, which he finds rather telling.

Author Don Peri points that in the 1930s, Walt Disney Productions was the industry leader in character animation. But as this studio's focus shifted from animated shorts to animated feature films, other studios started making their own advances in the field, at times depicting emotions that were absent from Disney films. Peri cites Bacall to Arms as a memorable depiction of lust in animation. The wolf himself seems similar to "Wolfie" by Tex Avery.

World War II ended in September 1945, but several animated shorts released later in that year and into 1946 still contained war-related references. In Bacall to Arms there is a newsreel featuring "wartime inventions put to peacetime use". The example depicted is that of a married man who uses a radar to receive early warnings for the unannounced visits of his mother-in-law.

The house in the Newsreel segment was the same house used in the Private Snafu short Payday, a short where Snafu keeps buying unnecessary items rather than investing money on that house when the war was over.

Norman Klein cites the film as an example of animated films referencing film noir and figures associated with the genre, such as Bogart. He argues that screwball comedy film, the chase-themed animated films, the crime film, and film noir were genres which shared certain elements. In his view, all were reactions to the melodrama films of the 1930s and all rejected the moralizing tendencies of these melodramas. They reacted by embracing depictions of outrageous behavior and amorality. Common themes among them were the depiction of poetic justice as malum in se, of faked sentiment as a tool of deception, and sardonicism as the primary form of humor.

== Home media ==
- Bacall to Arms is available, uncensored and uncut, on Looney Tunes Golden Collection: Volume 5, Disc 3.
- Also available as bonus feature on the DVD issue of To Have and Have Not (Region 1 and 4)
- It is also available on "The Golden Age of Looney Tunes Volume 2" laserdisc.

== Sources ==
- Barrier, Michael (1999), "Warner Bros.,1941-1945", Hollywood Cartoons: American Animation in Its Golden Age, Oxford University Press, ISBN 978-0199839223
- Crafton, Donald (1998), "The View from Termite Terrace: Caricature and Parody in Warner Bros. Animation", in Sandler, Kevin S. (ed.), Reading the Rabbit: Explorations in Warner Bros. Animation, Rutgers University Press, ISBN 978-0813525389
- Kanfer, Stefan (2011), "Cut the Gab and Bring Me an Order of Fried Rabbit", Tough Without a Gun: The Extraordinary Life of Humphrey Bogart, Faber and Faber, ISBN 978-0571260744
- Klein, Norman M. (1996), "Citizen Kane, the Cartoon: Screwball Noir, 1941-46", Seven Minutes: The Life and Death of the American Animated Cartoon, Verso Books, ISBN 978-1859841501
- Lehman, Christopher P. (2009), "United Productions and the End of Animated Black Representation", The Colored Cartoon: Black Representation in American Animated Short Films, 1907-1954, University of Massachusetts Press, ISBN 978-1558497795
- Peri, Don (2011), "Xavier (X.) Atencio", Working with Disney: Interviews with Animators, Producers, and Artists, University Press of Mississippi, ISBN 978-1604739404
- Sartin, Hank (1998), "From Vaudeville to Hollywood, from Silence to Sound: Warner Bros. Cartoons of the Early Sound Era", in Sandler, Kevin S. (ed.), Reading the Rabbit: Explorations in Warner Bros. Animation, Rutgers University Press, ISBN 978-0813525389
- Shull, Michael S.; Wilt, David E. (2004), "Slow Fade on the Home Front: 1944-1945", Doing Their Bit: Wartime American Animated Short Films, 1939-1945, McFarland & Company, ISBN 978-0786481699
- Worland, Rick (2011), "Humphrey Bogart and Lauren Bacall: Tough Guy and Cool Dame", in Griffin (ed.), What Dreams Were Made of: Movie Stars of the 1940s, Rutgers University Press, ISBN 978-0813549637
