= Arthur Davis (animator) =

American animator and director (1905–2000)

- Arthur Davis circa 1931
- Born: Arthur Davidavitch; June 14, 1905; Yonkers, New York, U.S.
- Died: May 9, 2000 (aged 94); Sunnyvale, California, U.S.
- Other names: Art Davis; Artie Davis
- Occupations: Animator, director
- Years active: 1918–1988
- Employer(s): Raoul Barré's studio (1918-1921); Jefferson Film Corporation (1921-1923); Out of the Inkwell Films (1923–1927); Screen Gems (1927-1941); Warner Bros. Cartoons (1941–1962); United Productions of America (1962); Walter Lantz Productions (1962–1965); DePatie–Freleng Enterprises (1963–1981); Hanna-Barbera (1960–1972; 1985–1988)
- Spouse: Rae Kessler (m. 1928; died 1978)
- Children: 2

Arthur Davis (né Davidavitch) (June 14, 1905 – May 9, 2000) was an American animator and director known for his time at the Warner Bros. Cartoons studio. He was sometimes billed as Art Davis.

== Early life ==
Davis was born on June 14, 1905, in Yonkers, New York, to Hungarian parents. He is the younger brother of animators Emanuel "Mannie" Davis and Phil Davis. Mannie eventually became a key director for Terrytoons, while Phil worked alongside Arthur at the Screen Gems studio before he left in 1933.

== Career ==
Davis got his start as a teenager at Raoul Barré's studio in 1918. He later moved to the Jefferson Film Corporation, when the Mutt and Jeff cartoons began being made there in January 1921. In 1923, he joined the Out of The Inkwell Films (Fleischer Studios) in New York after Dick Huemer proposed him as an assistant in 1922.

Davis is reputed to have been the first in-betweener in the animation industry. Another distinction was his part in filming the "bouncing ball" for the "follow the bouncing ball" sing-along cartoons of the 1920s. While one of the Fleischer brothers played the ukulele, Davis would keep time with a wooden stick with a white cut-out circle on the end, which was filmed and incorporated into the cartoon.

In 1930, Davis became an assistant animator for the Charles Mintz studio, later known as Screen Gems after Columbia Pictures acquired a stake in the studio in 1933. He was soon promoted to animator. While there, he helped create and develop Toby the Pup and Scrappy with fellow animators Dick Huemer and Sid Marcus. Davis eventually was promoted to director alongside Marcus and remained at the studio even after Mintz died in 1939.

By 1941, Davis was fired from Screen Gems by Columbia following a mass discharge of its Mintz-era animators. After attempting to obtain a job from Walt Disney Productions, Davis was hired by Leon Schlesinger Productions, which would be renamed Warner Bros. Cartoons once Schlesinger sold his studio to Warner Bros. Pictures (WB). Initially animating for Norman McCabe's unit, Davis worked with Frank Tashlin when McCabe was drafted into the Army. The two men had previously collaborated with the 1941 cartoon The Great Cheese Mystery before Davis' termination from Screen Gems. He continued to animate under Tashlin's direction until late 1944, when the unit was assumed by Robert McKimson.

Later in 1945, when Bob Clampett left and went to Screen Gems, Davis took over Clampett's unit. Davis completed three cartoons left unfinished by Clampett: The Big Snooze, Goofy Gophers, and Bacall to Arms; cartoons still in the outline or storyboarding stages at the time of Clampett's departure were allocated to other directors.

Davis directed a number of Looney Tunes and Merrie Melodies shorts, with a tone somewhere between those of Clampett and McKimson. He had a distinctive characteristic visual style, which can be seen as far back as Davis' Columbia shorts, in which the characters move from the foreground to the background, as well as from side to side, using all axes of the animation field. Davis was said to prioritize the animation of his shorts over the writing, as he felt insecure with the writers he was given.

Davis' unit at WB was shut down only two years later in November 1947, when the studio was having a budget problem. Davis was then taken into Friz Freleng's unit and served as one of Freleng's key animators for many years. Following his departure from WB, Davis joined Hanna-Barbera (H-B), where he worked briefly as an animator and was a story director for The Flintstones and The Yogi Bear Show. He moonlighted with WB to direct Quackodile Tears, his last work as a director at WB. He continued to work off and on with the studio as a consultant or a timing director until his retirement.

After leaving H-B in 1962, Davis went to Walter Lantz Productions as an animator. He left Lantz in 1965, later joining DePatie–Freleng Enterprises to direct Pink Panther shorts and other cartoon series.

== Death ==
Outliving most of his peers, Davis died peacefully on May 9, 2000, aged 94 in Sunnyvale, California, after humming a tune. He was cremated and his ashes were scattered at sea.

== Selected filmography ==
Davis completed multiple films that were already being produced. For example, "The Goofy Gophers" had its audio recorded before Davis worked on it.

=== As director ===
Release date	Title	Series	Notes
1934	Babes at Sea	Color Rhapsody	
1935	The Gloom Chasers	Scrappy	
1935	The Shoemaker and the Elves	Color Rhapsody	
1935	A Cat, a Mouse and a Bell	Color Rhapsody	
1935	The Puppet Murder Case	Scrappy	
1935	Monkey Love	Color Rhapsody	
1935	Let’s Ring Doorbells	Scrappy	
1936	Scrappy’s Boy Scouts	Scrappy	
1936	Football Bugs	Color Rhapsody	
1936	The Untrained Seal	Color Rhapsody	
1936	Dizzy Ducks	Scrappy	
1937	Puttin’ Out the Kitten	Scrappy	
1937	Scrappy’s Music Lesson	Scrappy	
1937	The Clock Goes Round and Round	Scrappy	
1938	The New Homestead	Scrappy	
1938	Scrappy’s Playmates	Scrappy	
1938	Hollywood Graduation	Color Rhapsody	
1938	The Early Bird	Scrappy	
1939	Scrappy’s Added Attraction	Scrappy	
1939	A Worm’s Eye View	Scrappy	
1939	The Millionaire Hobo	Phantasy	
1940	Barnyard Babies	Fables	
1940	Mr. Elephant Goes to Town	Color Rhapsody	
1941	The Streamlined Donkey	Fables	
1941	The Way of All Pests	Color Rhapsody	Davis is caricatured in this short as the Home Owner.
1941	There’s Music in Your Hair	Phantasy	
1941	The Cute Recruit	Phantasy	
1941	The Great Cheese Mystery	Fables	Last cartoon Davis directed at Screen Gems
1946	Bacall to Arms	Merrie Melodies	Left unfinished by Bob Clampett
1946	The Big Snooze	Looney Tunes	Left unfinished by Bob Clampett
1946	Mouse Menace	Looney Tunes	
1947	Goofy Gophers	Looney Tunes	Left unfinished by Clampett.
1947	The Foxy Duckling	Merrie Melodies	
1947	Doggone Cats	Merrie Melodies	Original release was processed through Cinecolor.
1947	Mexican Joyride	Looney Tunes	
1947	Catch as Cats Can	Merrie Melodies	
1948	Two Gophers from Texas	Merrie Melodies	Original release was processed through Cinecolor.
1948	What Makes Daffy Duck	Looney Tunes	Original release was processed through Cinecolor.
1948	A Hick a Slick and a Chick	Merrie Melodies	Original release was processed through Cinecolor.
1948	Nothing But the Tooth	Merrie Melodies	
1948	Bone Sweet Bone	Merrie Melodies	Original release was processed through Cinecolor.
1948	The Rattled Rooster	Looney Tunes	
1948	Dough Ray Me-ow	Merrie Melodies	Original release was processed through Cinecolor.
1948	The Pest That Came to Dinner	Looney Tunes	
1948	Odor of the Day	Looney Tunes	Original release was processed through Cinecolor.
1948	The Stupor Salesman	Looney Tunes	
1948	Riff Raffy Daffy	Looney Tunes	Original release was processed through Cinecolor.
1949	Holiday for Drumsticks	Merrie Melodies	Original release was processed through Cinecolor.
1949	Porky Chops	Looney Tunes	
1949	Bowery Bugs	Merrie Melodies	
1949	Bye, Bye Bluebeard	Merrie Melodies	
1949	A Ham in a Role	Looney Tunes	Uncredited, finished by Robert McKimson.
1962	Quackodile Tears	Merrie Melodies	Last cartoon directed for Warner Bros. Cartoons.
1968	The Pink Package Plot	Pink Panther	
1968	Pinkcome Tax	Pink Panther	
1969	In the Pink of the Night	Pink Panther	
1969	Sweet and Sourdough	Roland and Rattfink	
1969	A Pair of Sneakers	Roland and Rattfink	
1969	Dune Bug	The Ant and the Aardvark	
1969	A Pair of Greenbacks	Tijuana Toads	
1970	Say Cheese, Please	Roland and Rattfink	
1970	A Taste of Money	Roland and Rattfink	
1970	Bridgework	Roland and Rattfink	
1970	War and Pieces	Roland and Rattfink	
1970	The Land of the Tiger Moo	Doctor Dolittle	
1970	Mumbo Jumbo	The Ant and the Aardvark	
1970	High Flying Hippo	Doctor Dolittle	
1970	A Girl for Greco Gorilla	Doctor Dolittle	
1970	The Barnyard Rumble	Doctor Dolittle	
1970	Don't Hustle an Ant with Muscle	The Ant and the Aardvark	
1971	Rough Brunch	The Ant and the Aardvark	
1971	The Bird from O.O.P.S	Doctor Dolittle	
1971	Trick or Retreat	Roland and Rattfink	
1971	Mud Squad	Tijuana Toads	
1971	The Great Continental Overland Cross-Country Race	Roland and Rattfink	
1971	From Bed to Worse	The Ant and the Aardvark	
1971	A Fink in the Rink	Roland and Rattfink	
1971	Cattle Battle	Roland and Rattfink	
1971	Pink Tuba-Dore	Pink Panther	
1971	Psst Pink	Pink Panther	
1971	Pink-In	Pink Panther	
1971	Croakus Pocus	Tijuana Toads	
1972	Flight to the Finish	Tijuana Toads	
1972	Support Your Local Serpent	The Blue Racer	
1972	Punch and Judo	The Blue Racer	
1972	Camera Bug	The Blue Racer	
1972	Blue Racer Blues	The Blue Racer	
1973	Wham and Eggs	The Blue Racer	
1978	Pink Trumpet	Pink Panther	
1978	Pink Press	Pink Panther	
1978	The Pink of Bagdad	Pink Panther	
1978	Pink Bananas	Pink Panther	
1978	Pinktails for Two	Pink Panther	
1978	Star Pink	Pink Panther	
1979	Pink Suds	Pink Panther	
1980	The Yolk's on You	Looney Tunes	Part of the TV special Daffy Duck's Easter Egg-citement before being issued separately. Last cartoons directed for DePatie–Freleng.
1980	The Chocolate Chase	Looney Tunes	Part of the TV special Daffy Duck's Easter Egg-citement before being issued separately. Last cartoons directed for DePatie–Freleng.
1980	Daffy Flies North	Merrie Melodies	Part of the TV special Daffy Duck's Easter Egg-citement before being issued separately. Last cartoons directed for DePatie–Freleng.
