= Screen Gems (animation studio) =

American animation studio

Screen Gems, Inc.
- Formerly: Winkler Pictures (1921–1930); The Charles Mintz Studio (1930–1931); Charles Mintz Productions (1931–1933)
- Type: Subsidiary
- Industry: Animation
- Founded: 1921; 105 years ago
- Founder: Margaret J. Winkler
- Defunct: November 1946; 80 years ago
- Fate: Shut down
- Successor: Studio: United Productions of America (theatrical shorts, 1948–1959); Sony Pictures Animation (content production)
- Headquarters: New York City, New York (1921–1931); 7000 Santa Monica Blvd, Hollywood, California (1931–1940); 861 Seward Street, Hollywood, California (1940–1946), United States
- Key people: Margaret J. Winkler; Charles Mintz; Walt Disney; Bill Nolan; Ben Harrison; Manny Gould; Frank Tashlin; Dave Fleischer; Paul Worth; Hugh McCollum; Henry Binder; Ray Katz
- Products: Short films
- Production output: Animation
- Parent: Columbia Pictures (1939–1946)

Screen Gems, Inc. was an American animation studio and former film distributor, serving as the in-house animation division of Columbia Pictures during the golden age of American animation. Founded by Margaret J. Winkler and led during most of its existence by her husband Charles Mintz, it was best known for producing and distributing Walt Disney's works, namely the Alice Comedies and Universal Pictures' Oswald the Lucky Rabbit series, in addition to numerous series for Columbia Pictures such as the Krazy Kat, Scrappy, Color Rhapsodies, The Fox and the Crow, Phantasies, and Columbia Fables series.

Following Mintz's death, the studio underwent numerous leadership changes throughout the 1940s. Among those who headed the studio in the post-Mintz era were Leon Schlesinger Productions alumnus Frank Tashlin, Fleischer Studios co-founder Dave Fleischer, The Three Stooges producer Hugh McCollum, and Raymond Katz, brother-in-law of Leon Schlesinger. Alumni of Screen Gems would later found and work for Walt Disney Productions, Walter Lantz Productions and Warner Bros. Cartoons, all of which surpassed Screen Gems in popularity.

== History ==
=== Founding (1921–1926) ===
In 1921, New York City-based animation producer Pat Sullivan came to Warner Bros. Pictures president Harry Warner to sign a contract to distribute Sullivan and Otto Messmer's series of Felix the Cat animated short films. Warner declined to distribute the cartoons and instead told his secretary, Margaret Winkler, that she should form her own company and take control of the distribution of the series.

Winkler resultantly formed M.J. Winkler Productions; lacking a middle name, Winkler added the "J" initial for professional use and to partially disguise her gender. She found success distributing the Felix cartoons, and soon also took control of distributing Max and Dave Fleischer's series of Out of the Inkwell cartoons. By 1923, she and Sullivan were in constant dispute with each other, though they continued to work together; the Fleischer brothers broke from Winkler that year and formed their own distribution company, Red Seal. That same year, Winkler viewed a preview print of Alice's Wonderland, an unreleased short made by young Kansas City animator Walt Disney, which featured a live-action little girl superimposed into an animated world. Winkler signed Disney to produce a recurring series of these Alice Comedies, and Walt Disney set up a cartoon studio in Los Angeles with his brother Roy O. Disney and head artist Ub Iwerks to make the shorts.

In November 1923, Winkler married Charles Mintz, a film distributor who had worked for her since 1922. Mintz had quickly risen through the ranks within the Winkler organization; by the time of the marriage, he was sharing top management responsibility with Winkler.

In 1925, Winkler's renewal contract for the Felix shorts was drawn up, but she delayed signing due to the ongoing disputes with Sullivan. As a replacement, Winkler first attempted to get Disney and Iwerks to more heavily feature Julius the Cat, a supporting character in the Alice Comedies. Eventually, Winkler acquired the film rights to the Krazy Kat comic strip by George Herriman from King Features Syndicate. A former Sullivan animator and King Features Syndicate employee, Bill Nolan, was placed in charge of making the Krazy Kat cartoons at a studio in Long Branch, New Jersey in summer 1925.

As opposed to following the format of the abstract and esoteric comic strip, as two previous series of Krazy Kat cartoons from other filmmakers had done, The Krazy Kat Studio, as it was known, made cartoons under Nolan's direction that morphed Krazy Kat into more of a Felix the Cat clone. This and the prominence of Julius in the Alice Comedies angered Pat Sullivan to the point that he broke fully with Winkler and signed instead with rival distributor E. W. Hammons of Educational Pictures in 1925.

=== Winkler Pictures (1926–1931) ===
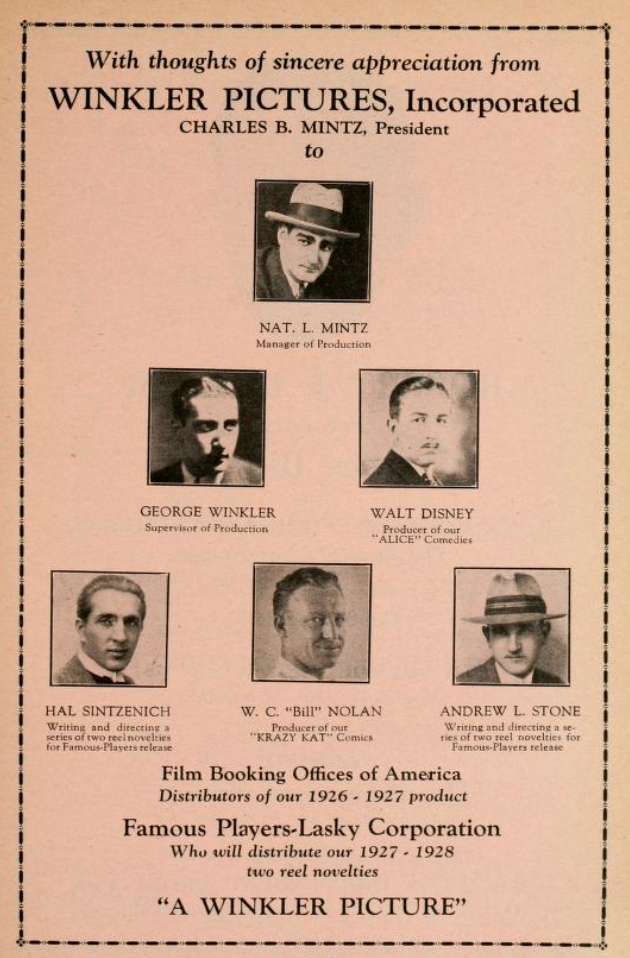
An advertisement by Winkler Pictures in their heyday, showing off their production crew in 1927

M.J. Winkler Productions became known as Winkler Pictures after Mintz took over in 1926, shutting down their distribution services and switching to production. Mintz had FBO distribute the Krazy Kat and Alice Comedies for the 1926-1927 season. The Alice Comedies concluded in 1927, and the all-animated Oswald the Lucky Rabbit was created in its place. Mintz would drop FBO for the 1927-1928 season, having Universal distribute the Oswald shorts, while Paramount distributed the Krazy Kat cartoons. Nolan was fired in favor of a new studio run by Ben Harrison and Manny Gould in the move to Paramount. Mintz also signed directors Harold S. Sintzenich and Andrew L. Stone to Paramount and produced numerous live-action short subjects they directed the same year.

In February 1928, when the Oswald cartoons proved more successful than expected, Disney sought to meet with Mintz over the budget, wanting to spend more on the cartoons. Mintz refused and hired away all of Disney's animators except Ub Iwerks, Les Clark, and Johnny Cannon. These three artists stayed on with Walt Disney, accompanying him to create the Mickey Mouse series, while Mintz moved the production of the Oswald cartoons to Winkler Pictures. Mintz's brother-in-law, George Winkler was installed as the administrative head, with veteran animator Walter Lantz and Disney defectors Hugh Harman and Rudolf Ising as the creative heads.

Management disputes between Winkler and the team of Harman and Ising led to disharmony at the Hollywood Winkler studio, with Ising being fired in December 1928. In April 1929, Universal Pictures president Carl Laemmle terminated Winkler's Oswald contract after one year and 24 cartoons. A new in-house cartoon studio was established at Universal, headed by Walter Lantz and Bill Nolan, who hired much of the Winkler staff. The Hollywood Winkler studio resultantly shuttered. Harman and Ising, accompanied by fellow ex-Winkler animators Friz Freleng, Rollin Hamilton, Paul Smith and C. G. Maxwell, started a studio of their own in April 1929 and signed with producer Leon Schlesinger the following January to produce the Looney Tunes cartoon series for Warner Bros. Pictures.

Mintz responded to these events by focusing on the Krazy Kat Studio. Mintz partnered with Columbia Pictures for distribution of the Krazy Kat cartoons in 1929, and in January 1930 moved the Krazy Kat operation from New Jersey to Los Angeles, where it was set up in the building vacated by the Winkler Oswald crew. Mintz also moved the other Winkler operations to California, closing the New York office and consolidating the Krazy Kat Studio and Winkler Pictures under a new name, the Charles Mintz Studio.

With its Columbia deal, the Mintz studio soon found itself in the awkward position of sharing space on the Columbia release schedule with Walt Disney's Mickey Mouse and Silly Symphonies cartoons, which Columbia distributed from 1929 until Disney signed with United Artists in 1932. To compete, Ben Harrison and Manny Gould slowly altered the Krazy Kat character even further; he now became a "cuter" character in the Mickey Mouse vein.

With Harrison and Gould focused on Krazy Kat, Mintz hired animators Dick Huemer and Sid Marcus from New York's Fleischer Studios, and teamed them up with animator Arthur Davis, a veteran of the Krazy Kat cartoons. The result was a series of 12 Toby the Pup cartoons for the 1930–1931 season distributed by RKO Radio Pictures. The series would be cancelled and replaced by the Scrappy series beginning in 1931 for distribution by Columbia. The Scrappy character quickly became the studio's most successful character during the 1930s, with creator Dick Huemer being quickly poached by Disney.

=== Becoming Screen Gems (1933–1940) ===
Charles Mintz Productions was renamed Screen Gems, Inc. in 1933, although the name had been used in copyrights as early as 1931. The name was originally used in 1933, when Columbia Pictures acquired a stake in Charles Mintz's animation studio. The name was derived from an early Columbia Pictures slogan, "Gems of the Screen", itself a takeoff on the song "Columbia, the Gem of the Ocean".

Mintz was nominated twice for the Academy Award for Best Short Subject (Cartoons), both times as producer of Color Rhapsodies shorts. His first nomination was in 1935 for Holiday Land, with the second in 1937 for The Little Match Girl. Production would continue on the Color Rhapsodies, Krazy Kat, and Scrappy cartoons under Mintz through the end of the 1930s. Between 1936 and 1941, 16 of the Color Rhapsody films were subcontracted to Cartoon Films Ltd., Ub Iwerks' animation studio. Iwerks, who had broken away from Disney in 1930, produced and directed 15 of these shorts himself, starting with Two Lazy Crows in 1936. The final short, The Carpenters, was done by Cartoon Films' Paul Fennell in 1941 to close out the contract after Iwerks had returned to Disney in 1940.

The Color Rhapsodies shorts were well received, but some of its other cartoons were not, mainly the late-1930s Krazy Kat and Scrappy shorts. Animator Isadore Klein was particularly frustrated with the Krazy Kat cartoons because of how little resemblance they bore to the comic strip by the mid-1930s. In an attempt to reverse this, Klein convinced Gould and Harrison in making the 1936 Krazy Kat cartoon Li'l Ainjil, which attempted a return to the Herriman style. The final product was found to be disappointing, and the series quickly returned to its Disney-esque interpretation of Krazy.

Columbia had given Mintz strict budget advances per-short, which frequently ran over budget as a result. In 1939, having become indebted to Columbia, Mintz relinquished his remaining ownership of the studio and the Screen Gems name to Columbia to settle longstanding financial problems. Facing increasingly poor health, Mintz resigned from the studio soon after; he died on December 30, 1939 from a heart attack.

As Columbia took full management control of the Screen Gems studio, it promoted the studio's production manager, James Bronis, to general manager, though Bronis was quickly replaced by George Winkler, Mintz' brother-in-law. The Krazy Kat and Scrappy series were discontinued in 1939 and replaced by two anthology series of black-and-white cartoons: Fables, which would only remain in production for three years; and Phantasies, which would continue through the rest of the studio's existence. Both series featured both one-shot stories and recurring characters. Krazy Kat continued to appear periodically across both series through 1940, and Scrappy through 1941, before both were fully phased out of Screen Gems' output for good.

=== Management under Frank Tashlin (1941–1942) ===
In March 1941, Columbia hired Frank Tashlin, previously a writer for Walt Disney Productions and director for Leon Schlesinger Productions, to work as a writer at Screen Gems. Wanting to revitalize the studio as a serious competitor to other West Coast animation studios, Columbia shut down Screen Gems briefly in October 1941, laying off most of its Mintz-era staff, including Davis, Gould, Lou Lilly, Sid Marcus, Harrison, and Winkler. Winkler was replaced by Ben Schwalb, a producer from Columbia's live-action shorts department, as general manager, while Tashlin was promoted to producer and creative supervisor.

Tashlin had a profound effect to the studio, having hired away many of the animators who had participated in the Disney animators' strike the previous summer. These recruits included artists such as Phil Duncan, Grant Simmons, Louie Schmitt, Volus Jones, William Shull, Pat Matthews, Howard Swift, Leo Salkin, John Hubley, Jim Armstrong, Zack Schwartz, Chic Otterstrom, Basil Davidovich, and returning animators such as Emery Hawkins and Ray Patterson. Screen Gems benefited by hiring the most displaced animators from the strike.

As creative supervisor, Tashlin often encouraged his staff to try something new and follow their own creative visions. He delegated directorial duties to Bob Wickersham and Alec Geiss (the father of Tony Geiss), and directed a small number of cartoons himself as well. Among these was The Fox and the Grapes (1941), based on the Aesop fable of the same name. The short inadvertently spawned Columbia's most successful characters with The Fox and the Crow, a comic duo of a refined Fox and a streetwise Crow.

Despite improving the studio's output, Tashlin's tenure at Screen Gems was short-lived. In April 1942, he was demoted from producer, with Schwalb taking on the title, before leaving completely in June following an argument with Columbia higher-ups. When interviewed by animation historian Michael Barrier, he said that the management "can't stay happy long when things are going well, so we ended up in another fracas and I left." He soon returned to Schlesinger Productions, joining several ex-Columbia artists who successfully made the transition. Meanwhile, Schwalb was replaced by Dave Fleischer, previously the co-founder and head supervisor of Fleischer Studios. Fleischer was already hired as an executive producer in April of that year, with him producing the 1942 World War II-themed short Song of Victory with Tashlin's supervision. By the end of the year, he effectively took full control of the studio amid Tashlin's absence. Albert Spar was also hired as a general manager for a short period before he was replaced by Paul Worth, one of the studio's musical directors.

=== Later developments and corporate affairs (1942–1945) ===
While Dave Fleischer had a profound legacy in the industry up to that point, his internal conflicts with his brother Max and him deciding to take full control of Fleischer Studio's production in 1940, leading to unsuccessful short series' like Gabby, Stone Age Cartoons, and Animated Antics, were partial reasons that led to the demise of his own studio. Unlike with Tashlin, Fleischer was much more detached from production and his employees, relegating himself to business-related affairs. In another interview with Michael Barrier, John Hubley referred to him as "one of the world's intellectual lightweights" while Howard Swift recalled how Fleischer also fancied himself as a good editor by editing completed cartoons in a way that broke continuity. His detachment gave the staff greater creative freedom, but resulted in final products that were more misdirected, incoherent and dialogue-heavy.

To increase cartoon production, Fleischer established a third unit helmed by Hubley and ex-Terrytoons/MGM animator Paul Sommer. Hubley became unhappy with the ultra-realistic style of animation that the industry was utilizing, and wanted to express animation in a way that rejected the status quo. Despite the continued reliance of slapstick, the Hubley-Sommer shorts diverged from the typical style of the studio by focusing more on stylized human characters and minimalistic backgrounds. This was short-lived, as Hubley later left after being enlisted in the United States Army, leaving Sommer to direct solo. Dave would also approve a series based on Al Capp's comic strip Li'l Abner, in a similar vein to adapting comics like at Fleischer Studios.

Fleischer was later fired in December 1943 and was succeeded by a revolving door of producers. Initially, Worth was promoted to Fleischer's position, but was then replaced by The Three Stooges producer Hugh McCollum on March 1945 when Worth was fired after getting arrested on forgery charges two months prior. Alec Geiss was also fired following a series of poorly received cartoons, and his role was soon given to Swift. The studio would create several more original characters during this time period, including Tito and His Burrito, Igor Puzzlewitz, Willoughby Wren, Professor Small and Mr. Tall, and Flippy and Flop, with varying degrees of success.

In addition to Tashlin's departure, several of the more daring ex-Disney animators that were hired also left for other studios, including Duncan, Davidovich, Schwartz, Hawkins, Matthews and Patterson. Columbia was unable to find any more experienced artists who were willing to stay for the long term, though the studio did manage to gain a few leverages. Milt Gross, a cartoonist who previously directed the Count Screwloose cartoons in MGM, would co-write the partially lost WWII short He Can't Make it Stick with Stephen Longstreet in 1943. Sid Marcus also returned as a story-man before being promoted to director in 1945 after Bob Wickersham’s departure, while Alex Lovy would succeed director Howard Swift. Walter Lantz composer Darrell Calker was also brought in to score music when Eddie Kilfeather retired after suffering a stroke in 1946.

=== Final years and closure (1945–1946) ===
By the summer of 1945, McCollum was replaced by Henry Binder and Leon Schlesinger's brother-in-law Ray Katz, both of whom were previously associate producers for the Looney Tunes shorts and left after Schlesinger's retirement. Katz and Binder would bring in several staffers from the Warner studio, including former director Bob Clampett, and writers Cal Howard and Dave Monahan. They also brought in alumnus animator Manny Gould and writers Michael Maltese and Tedd Pierce as moonlighters. Clampett was appointed as the studio's creative head and gag writer, but was shocked at how radically different the environment was compared to his time at Warners. He later left to briefly form his own animation studio for Republic Pictures. Clampett, Maltese and Pierce did not receive credit for any cartoon they were involved in.

As a result, the tone and direction of the Katz-Binder shorts had a much closer similarity to contemporary Warner or MGM shorts, to the point of creating characters strikingly similar in appearance to Sylvester the Cat (with "Klever Kat", who appeared in three shorts) and Daffy Duck (with "The Witty Duck" in Wacky Quacky). Most of these shorts were also thinly-plotted "chase cartoons", particularly with shorts like Kongo-Roo, Loco Lobo, The Uncultured Vulture and Big House Blues. Maltin considered these cartoons as "pale carbons of the Warner Brothers shorts."

Screen Gems, in an attempt to keep costs low, was the last major American animation studio to stop producing black-and-white cartoons. The final black-and-white Phantasy shorts appeared in 1946, over three years after the second-longest holdouts (Famous Studios and Schlesinger Productions), with the subsequent shorts being produced in Cinecolor. Columbia remained dissatisfied with the studio's output, so they ultimately decided to shut its doors for good in November. By the time it closed, Screen Gems had produced a backlog large enough for Columbia to release for the next three years. The last cartoon from the studio, Cat-Tastrophy, was released on June 30, 1949.

=== Aftermath ===
Following the studio's closure, the former Seward Street facility, which Screen Gems occupied since 1940, was taken over by Walter Lantz Productions in 1947. The Screen Gems name would later be reused for Columbia's television subsidiary Pioneer Telefilms, which wouldn't start operating under that name until April 15, 1949.

Most of the remaining animators moved to other studios; Grant Simmons would become an animator for Tex Avery at MGM Cartoons alongside ex-Columbia animators Louie Schmitt and William Shull, Paul Sommer would move back to the East Cost and returned to being an animator for Terrytoons, and Sid Marcus would move to Warner Bros. Cartoons as a writer for fellow alumnus Arthur Davis and later Robert McKimson. Howard Swift would continue to work for Columbia as an effects animator for the Superman serial series in 1948.

Columbia would continue to have a cartoon output following Screen Gem's closure by becoming a distributor for United Productions of America. Founded in 1941 during the wake of the Disney animators' strike, UPA deviated from the typical realistic animation seen from other studios. It presented a newer, limitedly animated art style with stylistic concepts and storytelling instead of traditional slapstick and gags. John Hubley and Zack Schwartz had previously experimented with this style in their Screen Gems cartoons and were also keys figures to the development of UPA. Columbia began releasing the UPA shorts in tandem with the last Screen Gems cartoons in 1948. There shorts, which included Gerald McBoing-Boing and the Mr. Magoo series, were major critical and commercial successes, leaving a profound influence to the animation industry by the 1950s. Following UPA, a deal with Hanna-Barbera was made in 1957, which lasted until 1967. Columbia also re-released a number of Screen Gems cartoons for theaters under the Columbia Favorites banner.

== Legacy ==
The Screen Gems cartoons were regarded as ones of varying quality, comparable to those produced by Famous Studios and Terrytoons. The studio - especially in its later period - was noted for their mismanagement of talent and struggles to compete with other animation studios. Animation historian Jerry Beck referred to the Screen Gems as "The little studio that couldn’t," and said that "Columbia’s poor Screen Gems studio tried its best to compete, but never really came up with a memorable character along the likes of Bugs Bunny, Tom & Jerry, Woody Woodpecker or even Mighty Mouse."

Animation historians note that the quality of the Screen Gems cartoons had a notable decline soon after Frank Tashlin's 1942 departure, characterizing its status as a studio lacking of its own distinct identity. Film historian Leonard Maltin said that the studio "tried to maintain some spirit on-screen [after Tashlin left], with varying results. Screen Gems cartoons of the 1940's feature some of the least-endearing cartoon characters ever created and suffer from misguided story direction." Some of the studio's former artists also expressed there discontent working at Screen Gems, including John Hubley and Howard Swift, while Al Capp was also reportedly displeased with the quality of the Li'l Abner cartoons, which were discontinued after five cartoons.

Jules Engel, who also worked at the studio in the 30's, also talked about his time in a December 1975 interview, saying that the experience was a "disaster" because of "people's lack of sensitivity of what the world was doing", and that "the whole place was very anti-intellectual, anti-sensitive to art, anti-art, anti-culture. [...] People were doing that because it was a job, but not with passion, not with tenderness."

In spite of the studio's affairs, the Screen Gems cartoons were still moderately successful, and even earned three more nominations at the Academy Award. However, Screen Gems never achieved the same level of success of its competitors, but it did serve as a springboard for many key figures of the industry who would later found or work for Walt Disney Productions, Warner Bros. Cartoons, Walter Lantz Productions and MGM Cartoons. This includes directors and producers Walt Disney, Walter Lantz, Hugh Harman and Rudolf Ising, as well as animators Ub Iwerks, Friz Freleng, Chuck Jones, Arthur Davis, Ray Patterson, Don Patterson, Preston Blair, Manny Gould, Shamus Culhane, and Emery Hawkins.

=== Availability ===
A minority of the studio's films are lost or out of circulation, while a majority of the studio's films only survive in reissued or black-and-white forms due to the studio's neglect of the original film negatives, a problem that also plagued Universal Pictures and Columbia Pictures. In 1999, Columbia TriStar International Television produced Totally Tooned In – a syndicated TV package showcasing Columbia's classic cartoon library. With the aid of Jerry Beck, Columbia restored and remastered the majority of the surviving color Screen Gems cartoons (as well as all the UPA cartoons) from their original 35mm elements. The show aired in several international markets before making its American television debut on Antenna TV on January 8, 2011. They would later be aired on Toon In With Me on the MeTV Network in November 2021. Despite these restoration efforts, Sony Pictures Home Entertainment has no current plans to release these shorts on DVD or Blu-ray.

Sony Pictures Releasing now owns the theatrical distribution of most Screen Gems films on behalf of Columbia Pictures, while Sony Pictures Television owns the television distribution on behalf of CPT Holdings, Inc. to the majority of the color Screen Gems cartoons library. One exception is the Oswald the Lucky Rabbit series, with the Winkler-era films' rights split between Disney Enterprises and Universal Pictures.

== Filmography ==
All series were distributed by Columbia unless otherwise noted.

- Felix The Cat (1922-1925) - distributed on a States Rights basis by Winkler before leaving for Educational Pictures
- Out of the Inkwell (1922-1923) - distributed on a States Rights basis by Winkler before formation of Red Seal
- Alice Comedies (1924–1927) - previously distributed on a States Rights basis by Winkler (1924–1926), then by FBO (1926–1927)
- Krazy Kat (1925–1939) - previously distributed on a States Rights basis by Winkler (1925–1926), then by FBO (1926–1927) and Paramount Pictures (1927–1929)
- Oswald the Lucky Rabbit (1927–1929) - distributed by Universal Pictures
- Toby the Pup (1930–1931) - distributed by RKO Pictures
- Scrappy (1931–1939)
- Color Rhapsodies (1934–1949)
- Barney Google (1935–1936)
- Fables (1939–1942)
- Phantasies (1939–1948)
- The Fox and the Crow (1943–1946)
- Li'l Abner (1944)
- Flippy (1946–1947)

== Screen Gems Inc. staff: (1921–1946) ==
=== Producers ===
- Margaret J. Winkler (1921–1924)
- Charles Mintz (1924–1939)
- George Winkler (1927–1941)
- James Bronis (1940)
- Frank Tashlin (1941–1942)
- Lawson Harris (1941)
- Ben Schwalb (1941–1942)
- Dave Fleischer (1942–1943)
- Albert Spar (1943)
- Paul Worth (1943–1945)
- Hugh McCollum (1945)
- Ray Katz (1945–1946)
- Henry Binder (1945–1946)

=== Directors ===
- Walt Disney (1924–1928)
- Ub Iwerks (1924–1928, (1936–1940)
- Bill Nolan (1925–1927)
- Ben Harrison (1927–1940)
- Manny Gould (1927–1940)
- Friz Freleng (1927–1929)
- Ben Clopton (1928–1929)
- Rollin Hamilton (1928–1929)
- Hugh Harman (1928–1929)
- Rudolf Ising (1928–1929)
- Tom Palmer (1928–1929)
- Walter Lantz (1928–1929)
- Dick Huemer (1930–1933)
- Sid Marcus (1933–1941, 1943, 1945–1946)
- Harry Love (1933–1934)
- Arthur Davis (1934–1941)
- Allen Rose (1936–1940)
- Lou Lilly (1941)
- Paul Fennell (1941)
- Frank Tashlin (1941–1942)
- Alec Geiss (1942–1943)
- Bob Wickersham (1942–1945)
- John Hubley (1942–1943)
- Paul Sommer (1942–1944)
- Dun Roman (1943)
- Howard Swift (1943–1946)
- Alex Lovy (1945–1946)

=== Animators ===
- Hugh Harman
- Rudolf Ising
- Friz Freleng
- Rollin Hamilton
- Ben Harrison
- Manny Gould
- Harry Love
- Allen Rose
- Lou Lilly
- Preston Blair
- Al Eugster
- Rudy Zamora
- Dick Huemer
- Sid Marcus
- Art Davis
- Phil Davis
- Herb Rothwell
- Bob Wickersham
- Bill Hamner
- Pat Matthews
- Emery Hawkins
- James Armstrong
- William Shull
- Phil Duncan
- Howard Swift
- Bernard Garbutt
- Isadore Klein
- Volus Jones
- Ben Lloyd
- Louie Schmitt
- Basil Davidovich
- Grant Simmons
- Paul Sommer
- Chic Otterstrom
- Jay Sarbry
- Roy Jenkins
- Morey Reden
- Jack Gayek
- Don Patterson
- Ray Patterson
- Don Williams
- George Grandpre

=== Additional staff ===
- Chuck Jones (inbetweener)
- Shamus Culhane (inker)
- Les Clark (inker)
- Tex Avery (inker)

=== Storymen ===
- Cal Howard
- Dave Monahan
- John McLeish
- Jack Cosgriff
- Milt Gross
- Stephen Longstreet
- Alec Geiss
- Sid Marcus
- Ford Banes
- Leo Salkin
- Sam Cobean
- Dun Roman
- Ed Seward
- John Hubley
- Frank Tashlin

=== Backgrounds ===
- Al Boggs
- Phil Davis
- Ed Starr
- Clark Watson (color)

=== Layouts ===
- Zack Shwartz
- Clark Watson
- Bill Weaver
- John Hubley
- Jim Carmichael

=== Voice actors ===
- Dick Huemer
- Leone LeDoux
- Sara Berner
- Mel Blanc
- Danny Webb
- Frank Graham
- Harry E. Lang
- John McLeish
- Lurene Tuttle
- Cal Howard
- Dave Barry
- Stan Freberg

=== Music ===
- Joe De Nat (1929–1941)
- Eddie Kilfeather (1937–1945)
- Paul Worth (1941–1945)
- Clarence Wheeler (1941)
- Maurice de Packh (1943)
- Darrell Calker (1945–1946)
