= Color Rhapsody =

Series of animated films

- Production company: Screen Gems
- Distributed by: Columbia Pictures
- Country: United States
- Language: English

Color Rhapsody is a series of usually one-shot animated cartoon shorts produced by Charles Mintz's studio Screen Gems for Columbia Pictures. They were launched in 1934, following the phenomenal success of Walt Disney's Technicolor Silly Symphony and Warner Bros.' Merrie Melodies. Because of Disney's exclusive rights to the full three strip Technicolor process, Color Rhapsody films were produced in the older two-tone Technicolor process until 1935, when Disney's exclusive contract expired.

The Color Rhapsody series is most notable for introducing the characters of The Fox and the Crow in the 1941 short The Fox and the Grapes. Two Color Rhapsody shorts, Holiday Land (1934) and The Little Match Girl (1937), were nominated for the Academy Award for Best Short Subject (Cartoons).

Columbia begin reissuing cartoons as Columbia Favorites from 1947 until the late 1960s, and extended past Screen Gems, with cartoons from UPA (which succeeded the original Screen Gems) and Hanna-Barbera's Loopy de Loop later on.

== Filmography ==
=== 1930s ===
No.	Title	Release date	Director	Character(s)	Notes
1	Holiday Land	November 9, 1934	Sid Marcus	Scrappy	
2	Babes at Sea	November 30, 1934	Arthur Davis		
3	The Shoemaker and the Elves	January 20, 1935	Arthur Davis		
4	Make Believe Revue	March 22, 1935	Ben Harrison		
5	A Cat, a Mouse and a Bell	May 10, 1935	Arthur Davis		
6	Little Rover	June 28, 1935	Sid Marcus		
7	Neighbors	August 15, 1935	Sid Marcus		Lost cartoon
8	Monkey Love	September 12, 1935	Arthur Davis		Soundtrack exists
9	The Bon Bon Parade	October 10, 1935	Ben Harrison		
10	Doctor Bluebird	February 5, 1936	Ben Harrison	Scrappy	
11	Football Bugs	April 29, 1936	Arthur Davis		
12	Glee Worms	June 24, 1936	Ben Harrison		
13	The Untrained Seal	July 26, 1936	Arthur Davis		
14	The Novelty Shop	August 15, 1936	Sid Marcus		
15	In My Gondola	September 3, 1936	Sid Marcus	Scrappy	
16	Merry Mutineers	October 2, 1936	Ben Harrison	Scrappy	
17	Birds in Love	October 28, 1936	Ben Harrison		
18	Two Lazy Crows	November 26, 1936	Ub Iwerks		
19	A Boy and His Dog	December 23, 1936	Sid Marcus	Johnny	
20	Gifts from the Air	January 1, 1937	Ben Harrison		
21	Skeleton Frolics	January 29, 1937	Ub Iwerks		
22	Merry Mannequins	March 19, 1937	Ub Iwerks		
23	Let's Go	April 10, 1937	Ben Harrison		
24	Mother Hen's Holiday	May 7, 1937	Sid Marcus		
25	The Foxy Pup	May 21, 1937	Ub Iwerks		
26	The Stork Takes a Holiday	June 11, 1937	Ben Harrison		Lost cartoon
27	Indian Serenade	July 16, 1937	Sid Marcus		
28	Spring Festival	August 6, 1937	Ben Harrison		
29	Scary Crows	August 20, 1937	Sid Marcus	Johnny	
30	Swing, Monkey, Swing	September 10, 1937	Ben Harrison		
31	The Air Hostess	October 22, 1937	Sid Marcus		
32	The Little Match Girl	November 5, 1937	Sid Marcus		
33	Hollywood Picnic	December 18, 1937	Sid Marcus		
34	Bluebird's Baby	January 21, 1938	Ben Harrison	Johnny	
35	The Horse on the Merry-Go-Round	February 17, 1938	Ub Iwerks		
36	The Foolish Bunny	March 26, 1938	Sid Marcus		
37	Snow Time	April 14, 1938	Ub Iwerks		
38	The Big Birdcast	May 13, 1938	Ben Harrison		Last Color Rhapsody short to credit director under Story.
39	Window Shopping	June 3, 1938	Sid Marcus		First Color Rhapsody short not out-sourced to Ub Iwerks to have a director credit.
40	Poor Little Butterfly	July 4, 1938	Ben Harrison		
41	Poor Elmer	July 22, 1938	Sid Marcus		
42	The Frog Pond	August 12, 1938	Ub Iwerks		
43	Hollywood Graduation	August 26, 1938	Arthur Davis		Lost cartoon
44	Animal Cracker Circus	September 23, 1938	Ben Harrison	Johnny	
45	Little Moth's Big Flame	November 3, 1938	Sid Marcus		
46	Midnight Frolics	November 24, 1938	Ub Iwerks		
47	The Kangaroo Kid	December 23, 1938	Ben Harrison		
48	Peaceful Neighbors	January 26, 1939	Sid Marcus		
49	The Gorilla Hunt	February 24, 1939	Ub Iwerks		
50	The Happy Tots	March 31, 1939	Ben Harrison	The Happy Tots	
51	The House That Jack Built	April 14, 1939	Sid Marcus		
52	Lucky Pigs	May 26, 1939	Ben Harrison		
53	Nell's Yells	June 30, 1939	Ub Iwerks		
54	Hollywood Sweepstakes	July 28, 1939	Ben Harrison		
55	Jitterbug Knights	August 11, 1939	Sid Marcus		
56	Crop Chasers	September 22, 1939	Ub Iwerks		Last Color Rhapsody short to credit Charles Mintz as producer.
57	Dreams on Ice	October 20, 1939	Sid Marcus	Johnny	
58	Mountain Ears	November 3, 1939	Manny Gould		
59	Mother Goose in Swingtime	December 18, 1939	Manny Gould		

=== 1940s ===
No.	Title	Release date	Director	Character(s)	Notes
60	A Boy, a Gun, and Birds	January 12, 1940	Ben Harrison		
61	The Happy Tots' Expedition	February 9, 1940	Ben Harrison	The Happy Tots	
62	Blackboard Revue	March 15, 1940	Ub Iwerks		
63	The Greyhound and the Rabbit	April 19, 1940	Sid Marcus		
64	The Egg Hunt	May 31, 1940	Ub Iwerks		
65	Ye Olde Swap Shoppe	June 28, 1940	Ub Iwerks		
66	The Timid Pup	August 1, 1940	Ben Harrison		
67	Tangled Television	August 30, 1940	Sid Marcus		
68	Mr. Elephant Goes to Town	October 4, 1940	Arthur Davis		
69	The Mad Hatter	November 3, 1940	Sid Marcus		
70	Wise Owl	December 6, 1940	Ub Iwerks		
71	A Helping Paw	January 7, 1941	Sid Marcus	Cornelius Van Goon	
72	The Way of All Pests	February 28, 1941	Arthur Davis		
73	The Land of Fun	April 18, 1941	Sid Marcus	Cornelius Van Goon	Called Mr. Lurk in this short.
74	Tom Thumb's Brother	June 12, 1941	Sid Marcus	Tom Thumb	
75	The Cuckoo I.Q.	July 3, 1941	Sid Marcus	Cornelius Van Goon	
76	Who's Zoo in Hollywood	November 17, 1941	Sid Marcus		Lost cartoon
77	The Fox and the Grapes	December 5, 1941	Frank Tashlin	The Fox and the Crow	
78	Red Riding Hood Rides Again	December 5, 1941	Sid Marcus		
79	A Hollywood Detour	January 23, 1942	Frank Tashlin		
80	Wacky Wigwams	February 22, 1942	Alec Geiss		
81	Concerto in B Flat Minor	March 20, 1942	Bob Wickersham		
82	Cinderella Goes to a Party	May 3, 1942	Alec Geiss		
83	Woodman, Spare That Tree	July 2, 1942	Bob Wickersham	The Fox and the Crow	
84	Song of Victory	September 4, 1942	Bob Wickersham		First Color Rhapsody short to credit Dave Fleischer as producer.
85	Tito's Guitar	October 30, 1942	Bob Wickersham	Tito, Burrito and Rosita	
86	Toll Bridge Troubles	November 27, 1942	Bob Wickersham	The Fox and the Crow	
87	King Midas Junior	December 18, 1942	John Hubley Paul Sommer		
88	Slay it with Flowers	January 8, 1943	Bob Wickersham	The Fox and the Crow	
89	There's Something About a Soldier	February 26, 1943	Alec Geiss		Lost cartoon
90	Professor Small and Mr. Tall	March 26, 1943	John Hubley Paul Sommer	Professor Small and Mr. Tall	
91	Plenty Below Zero	May 14, 1943	Bob Wickersham	The Fox and the Crow	
92	Tree for Two	June 21, 1943	Bob Wickersham	The Fox and the Crow	
93	He Can't Make It Stick	July 25, 1943	John Hubley Paul Sommer		Partially lost
94	A-Hunting We Won't Go	August 23, 1943	Bob Wickersham	The Fox and the Crow	
95	The Rocky Road to Ruin	September 16, 1943	John Hubley Paul Sommer		
96	Imagination	October 29, 1943	Bob Wickersham		
97	The Herring Murder Mystery	December 30, 1943	Dun Roman	Igor Puzzlewitz	
98	The Disillusioned Bluebird	May 26, 1944	Howard Swift		Last Color Rhapsody short to credit Dave Fleischer as producer.
99	Dog, Cat and Canary	January 5, 1945	Howard Swift	Flippy	
100	Fiesta Time	April 4, 1945	Bob Wickersham	Tito, Burrito and Rosita	
101	Rippling Romance	June 21, 1945	Bob Wickersham		Soundtrack exists
102	Hot Foot Lights	August 2, 1945	Howard Swift		
103	Carnival Courage	September 6, 1945	Howard Swift	Willoughby Wren	
104	River Ribber	October 4, 1945	Paul Sommer	Professor Small and Mr. Tall	
105	Polar Playmates	April 25, 1946	Howard Swift		
106	Picnic Panic	June 20, 1946	Bob Wickersham	Tito, Burrito and Rosita	
107	Loco Lobo	January 9, 1947	Howard Swift		
108	Cockatoos for Two	February 13, 1947	Bob Wickersham		
109	Big House Blues	March 6, 1947	Howard Swift	Flippy and Flop	
110	Mother Hubba-Hubba-Hubbard	May 29, 1947	Bob Wickersham		
111	Up N' Atom	July 10, 1947	Sid Marcus	Klever Kat	
112	Swiss Tease	September 11, 1947	Sid Marcus		First Color Rhapsody short to credit Ray Katz and Henry Binder as producers.
113	Boston Beanie	December 4, 1947	Sid Marcus	Klever Kat	
114	Flora	March 18, 1948	Alex Lovy		
115	Pickled Puss	September 2, 1948	Howard Swift		
116	Lo, the Poor Buffal	November 4, 1948	Alex Lovy		
117	The Coo-Coo Bird Dog	February 3, 1949	Sid Marcus	Meathead and Parrot	
118	Grape Nutty	April 14, 1949	Alex Lovy	The Fox and the Crow	
119	Cat-Tastrophy	June 30, 1949	Sid Marcus	Cat and Dog	Last Color Rhapsody short to credit Ray Katz and Henry Binder as producers. Last Color Rhapsody short released.

== Accolades ==
Film	Award	Category	Result	Ref.
Holiday Land	7th Academy Awards	Academy Award for Best Short Subject, Cartoons	Nominated	
The Little Match Girl	10th Academy Awards	Academy Award for Best Short Subject, Cartoons	Nominated	
Imagination	16th Academy Awards	Academy Award for Best Short Subject, Cartoons	Nominated	
Dog, Cat and Canary	17th Academy Awards	Academy Award for Best Short Subject, Cartoons	Nominated	
Rippling Romance	18th Academy Awards	Academy Award for Best Short Subject, Cartoons	Nominated	
