= Charles Mintz =

American film producer (1889–1939)

- Charles Mintz in 1931
- Born: Charles Bear Mintz; November 5, 1889; York, Pennsylvania, U.S.
- Died: December 30, 1939 (aged 50); Beverly Hills, California, U.S.
- Resting place: Hollywood Forever Cemetery, Los Angeles, California, United States
- Occupation: Film producer
- Years active: 1923–1939
- Spouse: Margaret J. Winkler (m. 1924)
- Children: 2

Charles Bear Mintz (November 5, 1889 – December 30, 1939) was an American film producer and distributor best known for producing animated cartoons at Screen Gems, leading the company from 1925 to 1939. Mintz's business decisions had led to the founding of rival studios such as Walt Disney Productions, Walter Lantz Productions and Warner Bros. Cartoons, all of which surpassed Screen Gems in popularity.

== Life before the film industry ==
Charles B. Mintz was born in York, Pennsylvania to an Austrian-Jewish family. His father, Wolf Mintz, was owner of a grocery store. As a child, Mintz possessed a great skill in photography. Mintz attended York High School. Mintz later enrolled in the Brooklyn Law School and graduated.

== Career ==
Charles Mintz married his business partner Margaret J. Winkler in 1924, assuming control of her company Winkler Pictures. The couple had two children, Katherine and William. Under Mintz, the company stopped distributing films in Walt Disney and Ub Iwerks's Alice Comedies, instead sticking with production as the company found distributors in FBO and eventually Universal Pictures. Mintz and Winkler's brother George asked Walt and Ub to develop what would become Oswald the Lucky Rabbit. Oswald films received critical acclaim and significant box office success, propelling Winkler Pictures to stardom.

In February 1928, Mintz convinced Disney's animators to leave him after he unsuccessfully demanded a budget increase, assuming control of the series' production. However, he failed to hire Iwerks, who left with Disney to create Mickey Mouse. Without Mintz's invasive presence, Mickey Mouse achieved greater success under independent distributor Celebrity Productions. At Winkler Productions, animators Hugh Harman and Rudolf Ising wrestled for control, asking Universal boss Carl Laemmle to remove Mintz from power. Laemmle promptly terminated Winkler's contract, hiring most of their animators while handing directorial duties to Winkler employees Walter Lantz and Bill Nolan.

Mintz renamed the company after himself after firing George Winkler, producing the Krazy Kat series for Columbia Pictures from 1929 to 1939, briefly sharing distributors with Walt Disney Productions which eclipsed his productions in popularity. The character was revamped to resemble Mickey Mouse instead of George Herriman's characters in a similar act of corporate sabotage. From 1930 to 1931, Mintz produced 12 Toby the Pup cartoons for RKO Radio Pictures. In 1933, Mintz's studio was renamed Screen Gems. Scrappy (1930–1941) was his biggest success which continued production after Mintz died, and Color Rhapsody which began in 1934 and continued until 1947. Fables began in 1939 and continued until 1942.

In 1939, Mintz became indebted to Columbia, which resulted in him selling the studio to Columbia Pictures.

After a heart attack, Mintz died on December 30, 1939. Screen Gems remained open until 1946. The name was later used for Columbia's television division, among other things. Walt Disney held Mintz in low regard, though he noted that Mintz cultivated his high standards on output quality, a quality integral to both men's success.

Mintz was nominated for two Academy Awards for Best Short Subject. His first nomination was in 1935 for Holiday Land, and he was nominated again in 1938 for The Little Match Girl.

Charles Mintz was portrayed in the feature film Walt Before Mickey by Conor Dubin.

== Selected filmography ==
Release date	Title	Series	Notes
1925	Hot Dogs	Krazy Kat	The first Krazy Kat cartoon produced by Winkler productions
1925	The Smoke Eater	Krazy Kat	
1925	The Flight That Failed	Krazy Kat	
1925	Hair Raiser	Krazy Kat	
1925	The New Champ	Krazy Kat	
1925	The Uke-Calamity	Krazy Kat	
1925	Bokays and Brickbatz	Krazy Kat	
1925	Jams & Jems	Krazy Kat	
1925	Monkey Business	Krazy Kat	
1925	Battling for Barleycorn	Krazy Kat	
1925	Punctured Romance	Krazy Kat	
1925	The Ghost Fakir	Krazy Kat	
1925	The Sucker Game	Krazy Kat	
1925	Back to Batching	Krazy Kat	
1925	Double Crossed	Krazy Kat	
1928	Mississippi Mud	Oswald the Lucky Rabbit	First Oswald short produced by Mintz
1928	Panicky Pancakes	Oswald the Lucky Rabbit	
1928	Fiery Fireman	Oswald the Lucky Rabbit	
1928	Rocks and Socks	Oswald the Lucky Rabbit	
1928	South Sea Isaacs	Oswald the Lucky Rabbit	
1929	Alpine Antics	Oswald the Lucky Rabbit	
1929	Ratskin	Krazy Kat	First Mintz Krazy Kat short with sound
1930	The Apache Kid	Krazy Kat	
1930	The Museum	Toby the Pup	First Toby the Pup short
1931	Yelp Wanted	Scrappy	First Scrappy short
1932	The Great Bird Mystery	Scrappy	
1932	The Treasure Runt	Scrappy	
1933	The Broadway Malady	Krazy Kat	
1934	Holiday Land	Color Rhapsodies	Nominated for an Academy Award
1934	The Dog Snatcher	Scrappy	
1935	The Garden Graft	Color Rhapsodies	
1936	The Untrained Seal	Color Rhapsodies	
1937	The Little Match Girl	Color Rhapsodies	Nominated for an Academy Award
1938	The Horse on the Merry-Go-Round	Color Rhapsodies	
1939	The House That Jack Built	Phantasies	
1939	Scrappy's Addie	Scrappy	Final Scrappy short produced under Mintz
1939	The Mouse Exterminator	Krazy Kat	Final Krazy Kat short produced under Mintz
1940	Man of Tin	Scrappy	

=== Series Produced ===
As head of Winkler Pictures and Screen Gems, Mintz oversaw the following series total counts:

- Krazy Kat (1925–1939) – 102 shorts
- Oswald the Lucky Rabbit (1927–1929) – 26 shorts
- Toby the Pup (1930–1931) – 12 shorts
- Scrappy (1931–1939) – 84 shorts
- Color Rhapsodies (1934–1939) – 48 shorts
- Barney Google (1934–1936) – 4 shorts
- Fables (1937–1939) – 40 shorts
- Phantasies (1939) – 22 shorts
