= Billy Bletcher =

American actor (1894–1979)

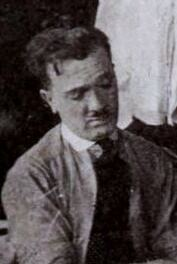
- Bletcher in Short and Snappy (1921)
- Born: William Bletcher; September 24, 1894; Lancaster, Pennsylvania, U.S.
- Died: January 5, 1979 (aged 84); Los Angeles, California, U.S.
- Occupation: Actor
- Years active: 1914–1971
- Spouse: Arlyn H. Roberts (m. 1915)
- Children: 1

William "Billy" Bletcher (September 24, 1894 – January 5, 1979) was an American actor. He was known for his prolific voice acting career for cartoons during the golden age of American animation, most notably Pete in Walt Disney Productions' Mickey Mouse short films and the Big Bad Wolf in Three Little Pigs. He also voiced various miscellaneous characters in cartoons from other studios, as well as Spike in various Tom and Jerry shorts.

== Early life ==
William Bletcher was born in Lancaster, Pennsylvania, on September 24, 1894, to Huber and Dora Bletcher.

== Career ==
Bletcher appeared on-screen in films and later television from the 1910s to the 1970s, including appearances in several Our Gang and The Three Stooges comedies.

He was most active as a voice actor. His voice was a deep, strong and booming baritone. Bletcher provided the voices of various characters for Walt Disney Productions (including his recurring roles as Black Pete and the Big Bad Wolf). He auditioned to play one of the dwarfs in Disney's Snow White and the Seven Dwarfs (1937). However, Walt Disney disapproved for fear that people would recognize Bletcher from the studio's Mickey Mouse and Donald Duck short subjects.

His booming voice can also be heard as "Don Del Oro" the Yacqi Indian god in the 1939 Republic serial, Zorro's Fighting Legion. He also provided voice work for Ub Iwerks as the Pincushion man in the 1935 animated short Balloon Land, Owl Jolson's disciplinarian violinist father in the 1936 Warner Bros. cartoon based on the song I Love to Singa, a wolf character almost identical to Walt Disney's incarnation in the Ub Iwerks cartoon "Little Boy Blue" released in 1936 and the menacing spider in Bingo Crosbyana.

In 1939, Billy Bletcher and Pinto Colvig were hired to perform ADR work for the Munchkins in The Wizard of Oz.

In MGM cartoons, he voiced Spike the Bulldog and on some occasions even Tom Cat, in Tom and Jerry, and in Warner Bros. cartoons many characters, most notably Henry "Papa" Bear of Chuck Jones' The Three Bears. He voiced the villainous wolf in Little Red Riding Rabbit (1944).

Bletcher did voice acting for the 1944 Private Snafu World War II training film "Gas", where Bletcher voices the villainous Gas Cloud. Bletcher also portrayed The Captain in The Captain and the Kids with MGM cartoons.

In 1950, he portrayed several characters on The Lone Ranger radio program as well as the TV series.

In 1971, he portrayed one of his final roles, Pappy Yokum in a television adaptation of Lil Abner. In 1978, he was originally hired to voice the Weed on The Plastic Man Comedy/Adventure Show, but had to drop out due to illness.

== Personal life ==
Bletcher married actress Arlyn H. Roberts in 1915 and had a daughter, Barbara.

== Death ==
Bletcher died at the age of 84 on January 5, 1979, in Los Angeles, California.

== Selected filmography ==
- A Sticky Affair (1916, Short) – Professor Perkins
- One Too Many (1916, Short) – Unhappy Boarder
- The Serenade (1916, Short) – Schmitte
- The Battle Royal (1916, Short) – Grandpa Runt
- The Brave Ones (1916, Short) – The Sheriff
- Aunt Bill (1916, Short) – Bogus Aunt
- Mary Jane's Pa (1917)
- Who Goes There? (1917)
- The Love Hunger (1919) – Jakey
- A Roman Scandal (1919, Short)
- A Bashful Bigamist (1920, Short) – Mr. Smith
- Her Honor the Mayor (1920) – Buddy Martin
- Turn To The Right (1922) – Sammy Martin
- Billy Jim (1922) – Jimmy
- Cornered (1924) – The Groom
- Romance Road (1925) – Patrick's Pal
- The Silent Guardian (1925) – Director
- The Wild Girl (1925) – Director
- The Bar-C Mystery (1926)
- The Dude Cowboy (1926) – Shorty O'Day
- One Hour of Love (1927) – 'Half Pint' Walker
- Wolves of the Air (1927) – 'Big Boy' Durkey
- The Patent Leather Kid (1927) – Fight Fan (uncredited)
- Two Girls Wanted (1927) – Johnny
- Better Days (1927)
- Daredevil's Reward (1928) – Slim
- The Cowboy Kid (1928) – Deputy Sheriff
- The Terrible People (1928) – Proody
- Loose Ankles (1930) – Mr. Berry from Logan (uncredited)
- Show Girl in Hollywood (1930) – Sign Man Scraping Names off Doors (uncredited)
- The Man Hunter (1930) – Buggs
- Dancing Sweeties (1930) – Bud (uncredited)
- Top Speed (1930) – Ipps (uncredited)
- Soup to Nuts (1930) – Revolutionary (uncredited)
- A Fowl Affair (1931, Short) – Sport Miller (voice, uncredited)
- The Texas Ranger (1931) – Tubby
- Monkey Business (1931) – Man in Deck Chair (uncredited)
- Branded Men (1931) – Half-A-rod
- The Secret Witness (1931) – Radio Announcer's Voice (uncredited)
- Bridge Wives (1932, Short) – Radio announcer
- Night World (1932) – Nightclub Patron (uncredited)
- Make Me a Star (1932) – Actor in 'Wide Open Spaces' (uncredited)
- By Whose Hand? (1932) – Police Radio Dispatcher (uncredited)
- The Boiling Point (1932) – Stubby – Kirk Hand
- Exposure (1932) – Society Editor (uncredited)
- Women Won't Tell (1932) – Tennis Game Radio Announcer (uncredited)
- Flesh (1932) – Man in Cafe (uncredited)
- The Dentist (1932, Short) – Bearded patient (uncredited)
- She Done Him Wrong (1933) – Singing Waiter (uncredited)
- A Lady's Profession (1933) – Keyhole McKluskey
- Mickey's Mellerdrammer (1933, Short) – Horace Horsecollar (voice, uncredited)
- Song of the Eagle (1933) – Home Brewer (voice, uncredited)
- Diplomaniacs (1933) – Schmerzenschmerzen (uncredited)
- The Three Little Pigs (1933, Short) – Big Bad Wolf (voice, uncredited)
- The Midnight Patrol (1933, Short) – Radio Dispatcher (voice, uncredited)
- Morning Glory (1933) – Actor (uncredited)
- Bedtime Worries (1933, Short) – Radio Voice (voice)
- The Way to Love (1933) – Man with Fat Wife (uncredited)
- Music in your Hair (1934, short) – Father (with Billy Gilbert and Ty Parvis)
- Shanghaied (1934, Short) – Pete (voice, uncredited)
- The Big Bad Wolf (1934, Short) – Big Bad Wolf (voice, uncredited)
- Buddy's Garage (1934, Short) (voice, uncredited)
- The First Round-Up (1934, Short) – Billy, Wally's father
- Buddy of the Apes (1934, Short) – Chief (voice, uncredited)
- Burn 'Em Up Barnes (1934, Serial) – Race Commentator [Ch. 1] (uncredited)
- Buddy's Bearcats (1934, Short) – Hot Dog man / Customer / Ballplayer (voice, uncredited)
- Punch Drunks (1934, Short) – Fight Announcer (uncredited)
- The Old Fashioned Way (1934) – Tomato Thrower (uncredited)
- Service With a Smile (1934, Short) – Lonesome Driver (uncredited)
- The Cat's-Paw (1934) – Reporter (uncredited)
- You Belong to Me (1934) – Man with Comb (uncredited)
- Viva Buddy (1934, Short) – Pancho (voice, uncredited)
- Servants' Entrance (1934) – Judge Egg (voice, uncredited)
- Buddy the Woodsman (1934, Short) (voice, uncredited)
- Buddy the Detective (1934, Short) – Mad Musician (voice, uncredited)
- Buddy's Adventures (1934, Short) – King Sourpan / Policeman (voice, uncredited)
- Babes in Toyland (1934) – Chief of Police (uncredited)
- The Dognapper (1934, Short) – Pete (voice, uncredited)
- One Hour Late (1934) – Smith (uncredited)
- Buddy of the Legion (1935, Short) (voice, uncredited)
- The Lost City (1935, Serial) – Gorzo
- Buddy's Pony Express (1935, Short) – Barfly / Villain (voice, uncredited)
- The Golden Touch (1935, Short) – King Midas (voice, uncredited)
- Life Begins at 40 (1935) – Hog Caller (uncredited)
- Buddy's Lost World (1935, Short) – Bozo / Penner type (voice, uncredited)
- Buddy's Bug Hunt (1935, Short) – Judge / Spider (voice, uncredited)
- Man on the Flying Trapeze (1935) – Timekeeper (uncredited)
- Buddy the Gee Man (1935, Short) – Warden / MachineGun Mike / Prisoners (voice, uncredited)
- Hollywood Capers (1935, Short) – Studio Guard (voice, uncredited)
- Balloon Land (1935, Short) – Pincushion Man (voice, uncredited)
- Two-Fisted (1935) – Cop (uncredited)
- A Cartoonist's Nightmare (1935, Short) – Villains / Old Man (voice, uncredited)
- The Rainmakers (1935) – Townsman (uncredited)
- Billboard Frolics (1935, Short) – Dave Rub-Em-Off (voice, uncredited)
- Gold Diggers of '49 (1935, Short) – Villain (voice, uncredited)
- Coronado (1935) – Waiter (uncredited)
- Pluto's Judgement Day (1935, Short) – Cat Prosecutor
- Plane Dippy (1936, Short) – Sergeant (voice, uncredited)
- Divot Diggers (1936, Short) – Bill, golfer
- Boom Boom (1936, Short) – Enemies (voice, uncredited)
- Alpine Antics (1936, Short) – Bully (voice, uncredited)
- Desert Gold (1936) – Bob – a Wedding Guest (uncredited)
- Two in Revolt (1936) – Algie (uncredited)
- Lash of the Penitentes (1936) – Narrating Missionary
- Three Little Wolves (1936, Short) – Big Bad Wolf (voice, uncredited)
- Bingo Crosbyana (1936, Short) – Spider (voice, uncredited)
- Early to Bed (1936) – Office Boy (uncredited)
- We Went to College (1936) – Alumnus Basso / Walter Catlett (singing voice, uncredited)
- Shanghaied Shipmates (1936, Short) – Captain (voice, uncredited)
- Rhythm on the Range (1936) – Buck's Friend (uncredited)
- When I Yoo Hoo (1936, Short) – "Hey, Lem!!" (voice, uncredited)
- I Love to Singa (1936, Short) – Professor Fritz Owl / Singing Blackbird (voice, uncredited)
- Satan Met a Lady (1936) – Father of Sextuplets (uncredited)
- A Son Comes Home (1936) – Snoring Sailor (uncredited)
- Wives Never Know (1936) – Drunk (uncredited)
- Milk and Money (1936, Short) – Mr. Viper (voice, uncredited)
- The Big Broadcast of 1937 (1936) – Property Man
- Don't Look Now (1936, Short) – Devil Cuckoo (voice, uncredited)
- Can This Be Dixie? (1936) – John P. Smith Peachtree
- Little Beau Porky (1936, Short) – Ali-Mode / Le Commdandant (voice, uncredited)
- Porky in the North Woods (1936, Short) – Jean-Baptise (voice, uncredited)
- Pigs Is Pigs (1937, Short) – Evil Scientist (voice, uncredited)
- Porky's Road Race (1937, Short) – Borax Karoff (voice, uncredited)
- Picador Porky (1937, Short) – Bull (voice, uncredited)
- The Fella with the Fiddle (1937, Short) – Grandpa Mouse / Tax Collector (voice, uncredited)
- Porky's Duck Hunt (1937, Short) – Man from Upstairs / Drunken Fish (voice, uncredited)
- Ain't We Got Fun (1937, Short) – Mouse in Checkered Cap (voice, uncredited)
- Sing While You're Able (1937) – Hillbillies (voice, uncredited)
- Uncle Tom's Bungalow (1937, Short) – Simon Simon Legree (voice, uncredited)
- Porky's Building (1937, Short) – Dirty Digg (voice, uncredited)
- Egghead Rides Again (1937, Short) – Boarding Room Clerk / Egghead saying “Because Because Because I Am A Man” (voice, uncredited)
- The Californian (1937) – Tax Collector
- High, Wide, and Handsome (1937) – Shorty (uncredited)
- Blonde Trouble (1937) – Third Musician (uncredited)
- A Sunbonnet Blue (1937, Short) – Villain Mouse (voice, uncredited)
- Get Rich Quick Porky (1937, Short) – Driver (voice, uncredited)
- God's Country and the Man (1937) – Sandy Briggs
- Speaking of the Weather (1937, Short) – Public Enemy / Judge (voice, uncredited)
- Dog Daze (1937, Short) – St. Bernard (voice, uncredited)
- I Wanna Be a Sailor (1937, Short) – Father Parrot (voice, uncredited)
- Carnival Queen (1937) – Barker (uncredited)
- The Lyin' Mouse (1937, Short) – Lion (voice, uncredited)
- Double Wedding (1937) – Wedding Guest (uncredited)
- The Case of the Stuttering Pig (1937, Short) – Lawyer Goodwill (voice, uncredited)
- A Girl with Ideas (1937) – McKenzie (uncredited)
- Lonesome Ghosts (1937, Short) – Short Ghost (voice) (uncredited)
- The Purple Vigilantes (1938) – Leader of the Purple Vigilantes (voice, uncredited)
- The Lone Ranger (1938, Serial) – The Lone Ranger (voice, uncredited)
- Boy Meets Dog (1938, Short) – Father (voice, uncredited)
- Porky's Phoney Express (1938, Short) – Porky's Boss (voice, uncredited)
- Now That Summer is Gone (1938, Short) – Father (voice, uncredited)
- Rascals (1938) – Patient (uncredited)
- Injun Trouble (1938, Short) – Injun Joe (voice, uncredited)
- Hide and Shriek (1938, Short) – Haunted House Ghouls (voice)
- Professor Beware (1938) – Shoeshine Customer (uncredited)
- Men with Wings (1938) – Red Cross Man (uncredited)
- Block-Heads (1938) – Midget (voice, uncredited)
- The Mexicali Kid (1938) – Stagecoach Driver
- A Feud There Was (1938, Short) – Weaver from Audience / McCoy at Cellar Door (voice, uncredited)
- Porky in Wackyland (1938, Short) – Roaring Goon (voice, uncredited)
- You're an Education (1938, Short) – Singing Tibetan / Thief of Bagdad (voice, uncredited)
- Orphans of the Street (1938) – Short Man (uncredited)
- California Frontier (1938) – Bellhop
- The Practical Pig (1939, Short) – Big Bad Wolf (voice, uncredited)
- The Lone Stranger and Porky (1939, Short) – Narrator / The Lone Stranger / Villain (voice, uncredited)
- Porky's Tire Trouble (1939, Short) – Porky's Boss (voice, uncredited)
- The Lone Ranger Rides Again (1939, Serial) – The Masked The Lone Ranger (voice, uncredited)
- Porky's Movie Mystery (1939, Short) – Invisible Man (voice, uncredited)
- Polar Pals (1939, Short) – I. Killem (voice, uncredited)
- Should Husbands Work? (1939) – Small Neighbor (uncredited)
- The Wizard of Oz (1939) – Mayor / Lollipop Guild (voice, uncredited)
- The Autograph Hound (1939, Short) – Security Guard (voice, uncredited)
- Dancing Co-Ed (1939) – Radio Man (voice, uncredited)
- The Kansas Terrors (1939) – The Masked Rider (voice, uncredited)
- Officer Duck (1939, Short) – Tiny Tom (voice, uncredited)
- The Covered Trailer (1939) – Short Man (uncredited)
- Destry Rides Again (1939) – Pianist (uncredited)
- Porky the Giant Killer (1939, Short) – Giant (voice, uncredited)
- The Film Fan (1939, Short) – Narrator of Masked Marvel (voice, uncredited)
- Zorro's Fighting Legion (1939) – Don Del Oro (voice, uncredited)
- Grandpa Goes to Town (1940) – (uncredited)
- Buck Benny Rides Again (1940) – Last Porter (uncredited)
- Edison, the Man (1940) – Reporter (uncredited)
- Sandy Is a Lady (1940) – Cop (uncredited)
- Scatterbrain (1940) – (uncredited)
- The Ape (1940) – Short Mustached Posse Man (uncredited)
- Hit Parade of 1941 (1940) – Radio Actor (uncredited)
- Mr. Mouse Takes a Trip (1940, Short) – Pete (voice, uncredited)
- Melody Ranch (1940) – 'Scarlet Shadow' Radio Actor (uncredited)
- Las Vegas Nights (1941) – Horse (voice)
- Reaching for the Sun (1941) – Butch Svoboda
- Angels with Broken Wings (1941) – Trombone Player (uncredited)
- Tight Shoes (1941) – Little Man (uncredited)
- Cracked Nuts (1941) – Parachute Man (uncredited)
- Whistling in the Dark (1941) – Radio Effects Man (uncredited)
- We, the Animals Squeak! (1941, Short) – Irish Mouse (voice, uncredited)
- The Bug Parade (1941, Short) – Spider (voice, uncredited)
- Rookie Revue (1941, Short) – General (voice, uncredited)
- Dumbo (1941) – Clown (voice, uncredited)
- Sullivan's Travels (1941) – Entertainer in Hospital (uncredited)
- Red Riding Hood Rides Again (1941, Short) – Wolf (voice, uncredited)
- Joe Smith, American (1942) – Police Radio Broadcaster (voice, uncredited)
- Saps in Chaps (1942, Short) – Cactus Pete (voice, uncredited)
- Wolf Chases Pigs (1942, Short) – Wolf (voice, uncredited)
- The Wild and Woozy West (1942, Short) – Angel Face (voice, uncredited)
- A Desperate Chance for Ellery Queen (1942) – Quarantine Sign Poster (uncredited)
- Priorities on Parade (1942) – Die Caster (uncredited)
- Enemy Agents Meet Ellery Queen (1942) – The Small Sailor
- I Married a Witch (1942) – Photographer (uncredited)
- The Valley of Vanishing Men (1942) – Jericho (voice, uncredited)
- Stand by for Action (1942) – Sailor (uncredited)
- Two Weeks to Live (1943) – Classified Ad Agency Collector (uncredited)
- Slightly Dangerous (1943) – Customer (uncredited)
- Chatterbox (1943) – Black Jake
- Good Morning, Judge (1943) – Radio Announcer (voice, uncredited)
- Who Killed Who? (1943, Short) – Detective / Ghost (voice, uncredited)
- Best Foot Forward (1943) – Waxer (uncredited)
- Swing Shift Maisie (1943) – Workman (uncredited)
- Crazy House (1943) – Policeman (uncredited)
- Is Everybody Happy? (1943) – Waiter (uncredited)
- Boss of Rawhide (1943) – Jed Bones
- Jive Junction (1943) – Radio Announcer (uncredited)
- True to Life (1943) – Radio Heavy (uncredited)
- Whistling in Brooklyn (1943) – Announcer (uncredited)
- War Dogs (1943, Short) – Spike (voice, uncredited)
- Little Red Riding Rabbit (1944, Short) – Wolf (voice, uncredited)
- Tom Turk and Daffy (1944, Short) – Tom Turk (voice, uncredited)
- Shine On, Harvest Moon (1944) – Vaudevillian (uncredited)
- Her Primitive Man (1944) – Native (voice, uncredited)
- Buffalo Bill (1944) – Short Man (uncredited)
- And the Angels Sing (1944) – Club Patron (uncredited)
- The Desert Hawk (1944, Serial) – Zeno the Magician (uncredited)
- The Canterville Ghost (1944) – Window cleaner (uncredited)
- The Bodyguard (1944, Short) – Spike / Tom (voice, uncredited)
- Maisie Goes to Reno (1944) – Public Address Announcer (voice, uncredited)
- Casanova Brown (1944) – Father in Waiting Room (uncredited)
- Mrs. Parkington (1944) – Quartet Member (uncredited)
- Lost in a Harem (1944) – Bobo (voice, uncredited)
- Incendiary Blonde (1945) – Clown (uncredited)
- Quiet Please! (1945, Short) – Spike (voice, uncredited)
- Road to Utopia (1945) – Bear (voice, uncredited)
- Mouse in Manhattan (1945, Short) – Jerry (voice, uncredited)
- People Are Funny (1946) – Singer – 'Alouette' (uncredited)
- Gay Blades (1946) – Lumberjack (uncredited)
- Deadline at Dawn (1946) – Waiter (uncredited)
- The Kid from Brooklyn (1946) – News Photographer (uncredited)
- Solid Serenade (1946, Short) – Killer (Spike) (laughing) / Tom (voice, uncredited)
- Gallant Journey (1946) – Mahoney's Valet (uncredited)
- The Verdict (1946) – Gravedigger (uncredited)
- Sinbad the Sailor (1947) – Crier at Auction (uncredited)
- The Secret Life of Walter Mitty (1947) – Western Character (uncredited)
- Down to Earth (1947) – Conductor (uncredited)
- The Senator Was Indiscreet (1947) – Newsboy (uncredited)
- The Truce Hurts (1948, Short) – Butch (Spike) (voice, uncredited)
- Rabbit Punch (1948, Short) – The Champ (voice, uncredited)
- Loaded Pistols (1948) – Townsman (uncredited)
- Mississippi Hare (1949, Short) – Colonel Shuffle (voice, uncredited)
- Night Unto Night (1949) – Man in Hotel (scenes deleted)
- Bowery Bugs (1949, Short) – Steve Brodie (voice, uncredited)
- Heavenly Puss (1949, Short) – Devil Dog (voice, uncredited)
- The Next Voice You Hear... (1950) – Newspaper Subscriber (uncredited)
- Navy Bound (1951) – Schott, Fight Promoter
- Father Takes the Air (1951) – Haggarly
- Two-Gun Goofy (1952, Short) – Pete (voice, uncredited)
- How to Be a Detective (1952, Short) – Al Muldoon (voice, uncredited)
- Houdini (1953) – Italian Basso (uncredited)
- Calamity Jane (1953) – Prospector (uncredited)
- Canvas Back Duck (1953, Short) – Pee Wee Pete (voice, uncredited)
- Destry (1954) – Townsman (uncredited)
- Sleeping Beauty (1959) – Goons (voice, uncredited)
- It's Only Money (1962) – Sign Painter (uncredited)
- The Nutty Professor (1963) – Plumber (uncredited)
- The Patsy (1964) – Table Captain #3 (uncredited)
- Harlow (1965) – – Policeman (uncredited)
- The Chase (1966) – Mr. Vincent (uncredited)
- Hello, Dolly! (1969) – Minor Role (uncredited)
- Get Smart (1970, TV Series) – Frank Ogg
- Li'l Abner (1971, TV Movie) – Pappy Yokum (final film role)
- Get a Horse! (2013, Short) – Peg-Leg Pete (archival footage)
