= Count Me Out (1938 film) =

1938 film by Ben Hardaway and Cal Dalton

- Title card
- Directed by: Ben Hardaway; Cal Dalton
- Story by: Melvin Millar
- Produced by: Leon Schlesinger
- Starring: Mel Blanc; Tex Avery
- Music by: Carl W. Stalling
- Animation by: Herman Cohen
- Color process: Technicolor
- Production company: Leon Schlesinger Productions
- Distributed by: Warner Bros. Pictures; The Vitaphone Corporation
- Release date: December 17, 1938
- Running time: 7 min
- Country: United States
- Language: English

Count Me Out is a 1938 American animated comedy short film directed by Ben Hardaway and Cal Dalton. The short was released on December 17, 1938. It is part of the Merrie Melodies series and the fourth and final cartoon to feature Egghead, who would be retired in favor of Elmer Fudd.

== Plot ==
Egghead finds a letter advertising a $1 boxing course, which he partakes in by mailing the money and instantly retrieves a kit, which includes boxing gear and an instructional record. He almost asphyxiates when the narrator instructs him to hold in his breath and is distracted. He is knocked out by the unruly punching bag when it sticks to the other side then swings back. Egghead then wakes up and punches the punching bag like usual until the narrator instructs him to stop. The punching bag somehow continues to swing, which the narrator annoyedly blames it on Egghead, only for Egghead to shoot it. After a final lesson on dodging, Egghead receives a diploma but is knocked out by boxing gear.

Egghead fantasizes taking on dog-like champion Biff Stew. Egghead is mocked by the referee while he places the record on the player and tries to overhear Biff's strategies. His over-reliance on the training record leads to him being easily defeated round over round. Egghead wakes up, perceives the nightmare as a warning and takes it to heart, only to be hit by the punching bag again.

== Voice cast ==
- Mel Blanc as Record Boxing Coach, Old Mailman
- Danny Webb as Egghead, Biff Stew, Charlie McCarthy Imitation
- Tex Avery as Fight Referee
- Joe Twerp as Fight Commentator

== Home media ==
Count Me Out is available as a bonus feature on The Amazing Dr. Clitterhouse DVD release.
