= Gold Rush Daze =

1939 film by Ben Hardaway and Cal Dalton

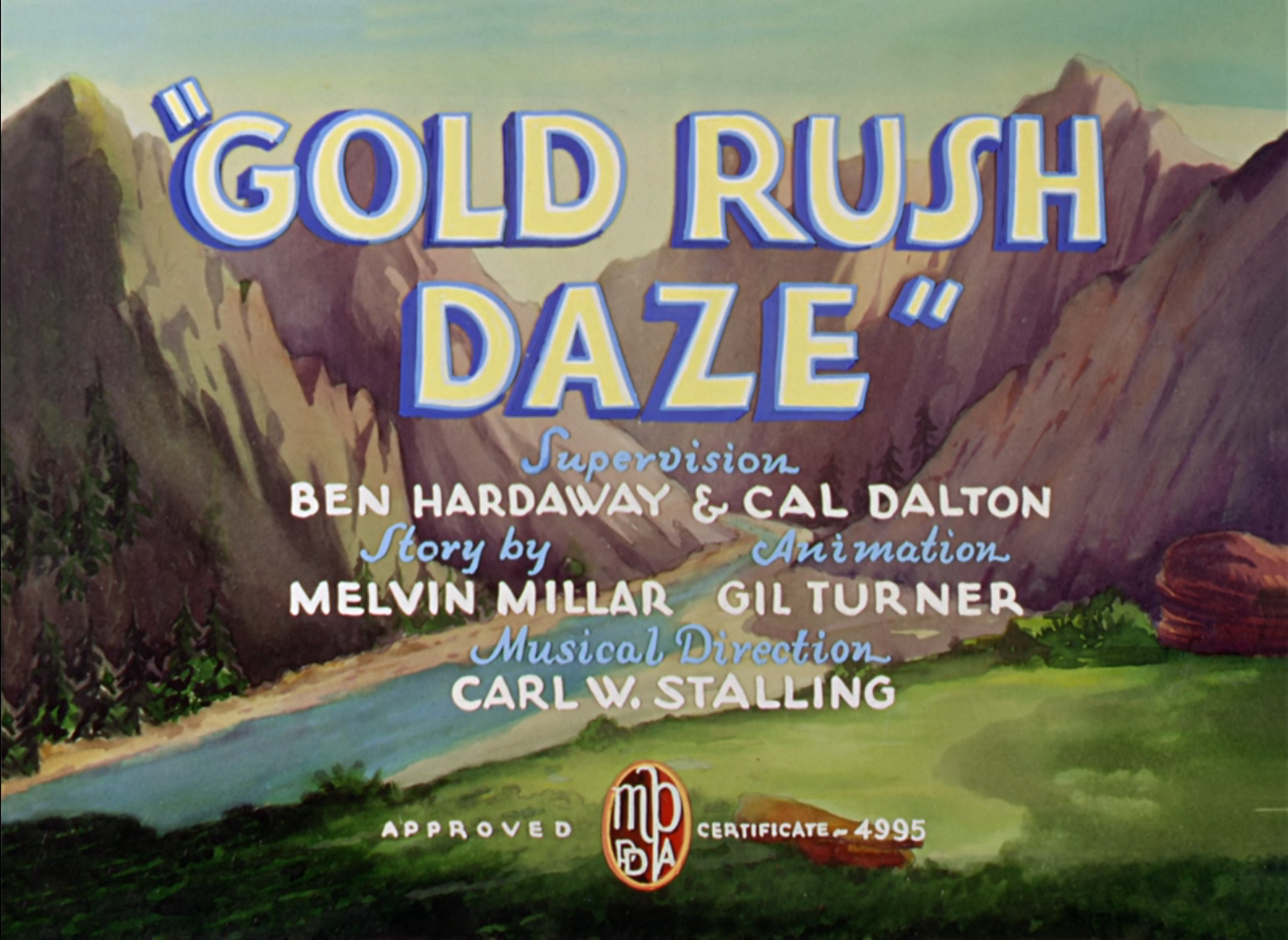
- Title card
- Directed by: Ben Hardaway; Cal Dalton
- Story by: Melvin Millar
- Produced by: Leon Schlesinger
- Starring: Mel Blanc
- Music by: Carl W. Stalling
- Animation by: Gil Turner
- Color process: Technicolor
- Production company: Leon Schlesinger Productions
- Distributed by: Warner Bros. Pictures; The Vitaphone Corporation
- Release date: February 25, 1939
- Running time: 7:11
- Language: English

Gold Rush Daze is a 1939 American animated comedy short film directed by Ben Hardaway and Cal Dalton. The short was released on February 25, 1939. It is part of the Merrie Melodies series.

== Plot ==
Full short in restored form

A dog prospector drives to the hills to dig for gold. A dog gas station attendant warns him that he is wasting his time, then goes on to tell the story of his own fruitless chase for gold.

In 1849, the attendant was a prospector himself, who was in the midst of gambling his earnings away when he hears news of found gold. He arrives and struggles to find an unoccupied digging spot until he digs off a cliff's edge and falls. Despite his injuries, he hears news about gold again and tries a vain attempt in gold panning. He then continues to find gold around the world to no success, leading to his retirement and distrust of gold strikes.

As the attendant finishes his story, a driver rides up with news that there has indeed been gold found in the hills. The attendant steals the prospector's car and gear to chase this rush, implying that his experiences as they are told may be fabricated in a successful attempt to dissuade the prospector, who is nonchalantly left with the gas station.
