= Hobo Gadget Band =

1939 film by Ben Hardaway and Cal Dalton

- Directed by: Ben Hardaway; Cal Dalton
- Story by: Jack Miller
- Produced by: Leon Schlesinger
- Starring: Mel Blanc; Pinto Colvig; The Paul Taylor Group
- Music by: Carl W. Stalling
- Animation by: Richard Bickenbach
- Color process: Technicolor
- Production company: Leon Schlesinger Productions
- Distributed by: Warner Bros. Pictures
- Release date: June 17, 1939
- Running time: 8 min
- Country: United States
- Language: English

Hobo Gadget Band is a 1939 American animated comedy short film directed by Ben Hardaway and Cal Dalton. The short was released on June 17, 1939. It is part of the Merrie Melodies series. It is the last film in the series to be named after a song and intended to promote it, as the series would pivot towards more successful comedic films until its retirement. It was re-released as a "Blue Ribbon" reissue in 1948, rendering the original film and credits lost.

== Plot ==
A "hobo hotel" located in the wild is inhabited by various musically talented hobos, one of which wakes up, "showers" (dodging every rain drop except for two for his eyes) and takes a soda tablet which fizzes at a rate he is unable to control. As the hobos get ready for the day, one spots a train that passes through a series of cities they are interested in, so the hobos, led by a Goofy-like hobo, embark on the train's back cabins. The train conductor notices their singing and kicks them out with a "hobo eliminator", after which they luckily land next to an advertisement wanting amateur musicians for a radio show. They team up and join to start a performance of the titular song, surprising listeners with their skill and professionalism, despite having to resort to improvised instruments. The host is impressed by their performance and is willing to start their careers with a contract, but the hobos remain dedicated towards their vagabond lifestyle and leave for another train.
