= Buddy's Pony Express =

1935 film by Ben Hardaway

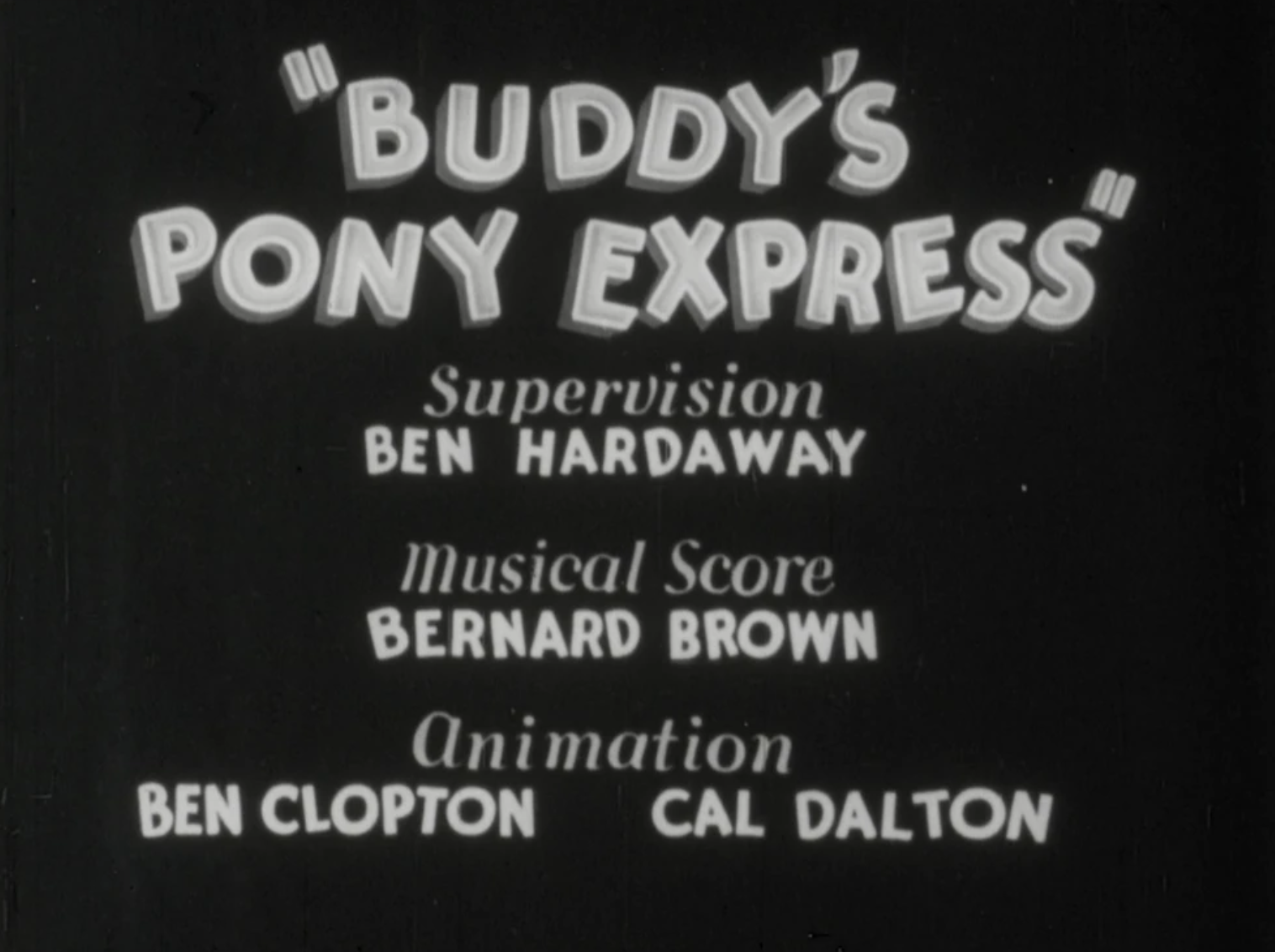
- Title card
- Directed by: Ben Hardaway
- Produced by: Leon Schlesinger
- Starring: Billy Bletcher; Bernice Hansen; Jackie Morrow
- Music by: Bernard Brown
- Animation by: Ben Clopton; Cal Dalton
- Color process: Black-and-white
- Production company: Leon Schlesinger Productions
- Distributed by: Warner Bros. Productions; The Vitaphone Corporation
- Release date: March 9, 1935
- Running time: 7 minutes
- Country: United States
- Language: English

Buddy's Pony Express is a 1935 American animated comedy short film directed by Ben Hardaway. The short was released on March 9, 1935. It is the 54th film in the Looney Tunes series and the seventeenth cartoon to feature Buddy.

== Plot ==
The film opens to a lawless town in the Old West. A man shot to death rolls into an undertaker's services. Two men duel, with the burly men catching the small man's gun in his own and shoots him into the sky, only for them to fall into a crater and buried by the undertaker. Buddy plays the piano at a saloon, where a dog becomes incapacitated by liquor served by a pig bartender. Cookie the serving girl sings while serving wine. Buddy appears in a costume that is shot by a patron, and is hit by a lamp in the process.

A dog enters, and posts an announcement of a horse race organized by the Pony Express, who will award a mail contract to the fastest horse rider. All run off to prepare. Buddy claims that his horse is "the fastest in the county". Seeing that the time is nigh, Buddy goes off to ready himself. A jealous dog brings Buddy's horse to a glue factory, exchanging it for an anemic old horse, inflating him like a balloon and painting him before placing him at the saloon. Buddy obliviously brings the horse to the competition.

At the start of the competition, a competitor rides a dachshund who is distracted by a rabbit resembling Hardaway's prototype of Bugs Bunny. The dog swings another competitor by his horse's tail to slow him down, and does the same to Buddy's horse. Unfortunately, hubris gets the better of him as he slams on a cactus, causing his horse to continue without him and allowing Buddy to surpass him. Buddy is almost swept offboard and his saddle is tied to a tree, allowing the dog to surpass him. The dog then crosses a rope bridge, shaking it to terrify Buddy, only for the bridge to rebound and wrap around Buddy, allowing him to continue. The dog kicks Buddy off a cliff into a branch and prepares to drop a rock on him, only for it to rebound and hit him, dragging them and their horses down.

Both end up underwater, with Buddy paddling his horse while the dog dives with his horse and pops Buddy's horse. Buddy drags the horse to shore when a thunderstorm occurs and lightning strikes the horse multiple times, causing it to run in pain. At the finish line, Buddy and the dog fall into potholes, only for the dog to make the fatal mistake of resurfacing while Buddy's horse digs a hole that allows him to emerge beyond the finish line. Buddy and Cookie kiss the horse as thanks.
