= Love and Curses =

1938 film by Ben Hardaway and Cal Dalton

- Directed by: Ben Hardaway; Cal Dalton
- Story by: Melvin Millar
- Produced by: Leon Schlesinger
- Starring: Mel Blanc; Mildred Carroll
- Music by: Carl W. Stalling
- Animation by: Herman Cohen
- Color process: Technicolor
- Production company: Leon Schlesinger Productions
- Distributed by: Warner Bros. Pictures; The Vitaphone Corporation
- Release date: July 9, 1938
- Running time: 8 min
- Country: United States
- Language: English

Love and Curses is a 1938 American animated comedy short film directed by Ben Hardaway and Cal Dalton. The short was released on July 9, 1938. It is the 98th film in the Merrie Melodies series and the first to be directed together by Hardaway and Dalton, as Cal Howard left the studio after directing three cartoons with Dalton.

== Plot ==
An old couple, Harold and Emily, are looking through a photo album of the 1890s, when fancy hats such as one made of fruits that are instantly ravaged by birds are commonplace, and when penny arcades were a form of entertainment. He finds a picture of Roger St. Clair, who fails to convince Emily to leave Harold for the city and abducts her.

Harold searches for Emily in the city for six months while she is forced to sing at a bar, where her sorrow enhances her performance and reduces the crowd to tears. Harold spots and reunites with her happily, only to be incapacitated by a stage background as Roger abducts Emily again. Roger traps Emily on the train tracks to kill her and bait Harold, who solves this by lifting the train tracks, but is duped again as Emily is brought to a nearby sawmill. He knocks out Harold with a log and sends him to the sawblade, but he is too durable to be harmed and instead destroys the machinery. Roger shoots Harold to no avail, and is thrown on a plank out of the window, but somehow returns and hits Harold from behind. He knocks Roger into a nearby river.

Harold notes that it has been forty years since Roger's disappearance and wonders where he has been. Just then, a decrepit Roger appears and abducts Emily, having never forgotten the incident; knowing that Roger is too old and weak to win again, Harold jovially walks out to rescue Emily and defeat Roger once again.

== Voice cast ==
- Mel Blanc as Harold, Roger St. Clair, Sailor, Man at Peep Show
- Mildred Carroll as Emily
- Bill Days, Max Smith, John Rarig, Thurl Ravenscroft and Paul Taylor as Singing Bartenders
