= Busy Bakers =

1940 film by Ben Hardaway and Cal Dalton

- Directed by: Ben Hardaway; Cal Dalton
- Story by: Jack Miller
- Produced by: Leon Schlesinger
- Starring: Mel Blanc; The Sportsmen Quartet (both uncredited)
- Music by: Carl W. Stalling
- Animation by: Richard Bickenbach
- Color process: Technicolor
- Production company: Leon Schlesinger Productions
- Distributed by: Warner Bros. Pictures
- Release date: February 10, 1940
- Running time: 7 min
- Country: United States
- Language: English

Busy Bakers is a 1940 American animated comedy short film directed by Ben Hardaway and Cal Dalton. The short was released on February 10, 1940. It is part of the Merrie Melodies series and the final to be directed by Hardaway and Dalton, who were demoted after Isadore Freleng returned from Metro-Goldwyn-Mayer in 1939.

== Plot ==
Swenson the baker is in the verge of closing his business, as he has only a half-eaten donut left to sell with no profits whatsoever. A blind old man enters and begs for a few crumbs of bread, which the baker obliges by offering him the entire donut. This is all a ruse, as the old man is revealed to be a baker too, as he leads his bumbling employees to secretly rejuvenate Swenson's business while Swenson sleeps. The bakers struggle comedically, but persevere and successfully finish a plethora of breads and desserts. As the food sells out and Swenson experiences his first profit in a long time, he offers a pie to the old man again, but thwarts his attempt to get long-term free food by noting his 5-cent deposit upon receiving the pie, which the old man reacts to by throwing the pie at his face.

== Home media ==
- LaserDisc - The Golden Age of Looney Tunes, Volume 4, Side 8
- DVD - Brother Orchid (USA 1995 Turner print added as a bonus)
