= Buddy the Gee Man =

1935 film by Jack King

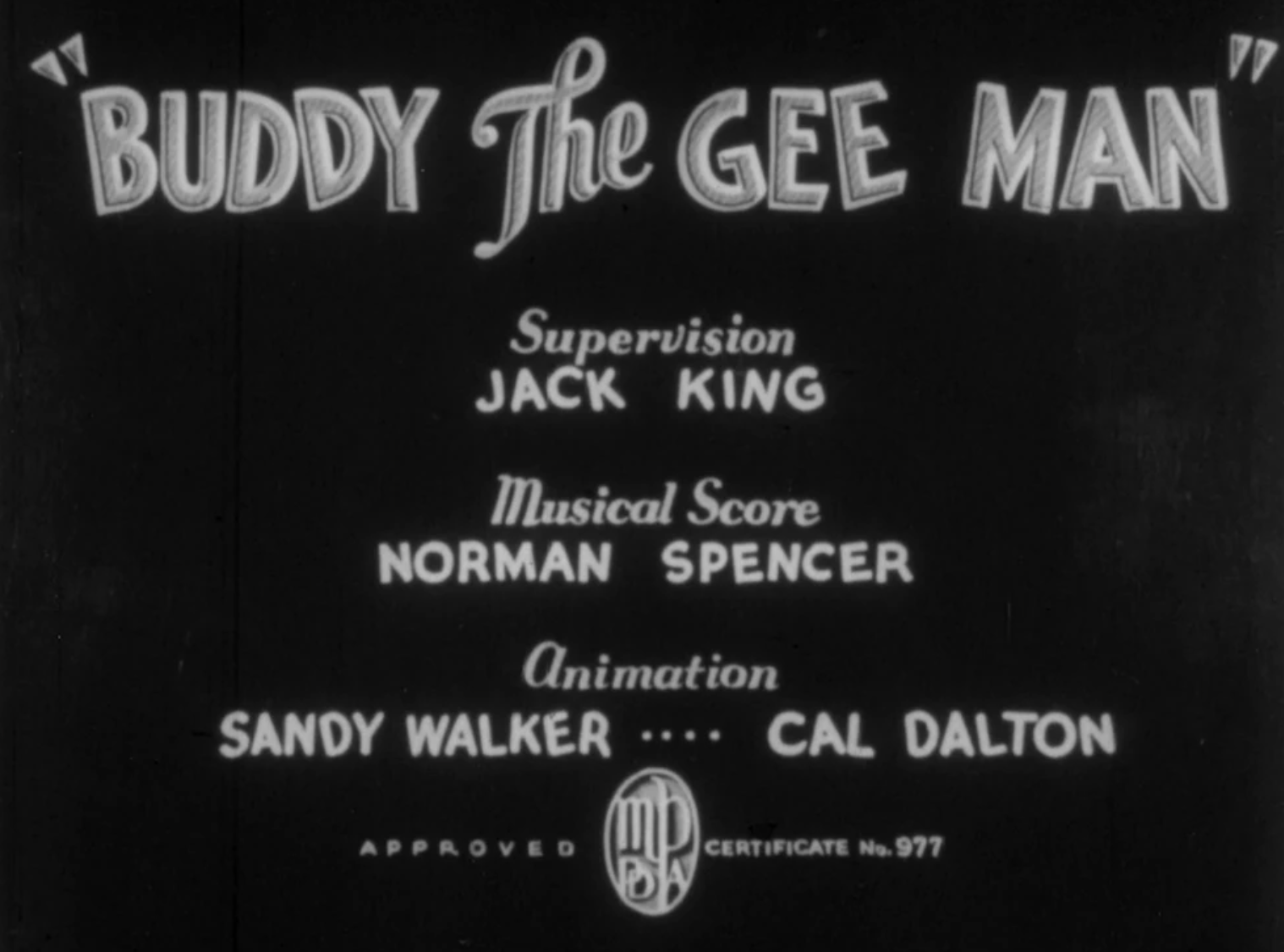
- Title card
- Directed by: Jack King
- Produced by: Leon Schlesinger
- Starring: Jackie Morrow; Billy Bletcher
- Music by: Norman Spencer
- Animation by: Sandy Walker; Cal Dalton
- Color process: Black-and-white
- Production company: Leon Schlesinger Productions
- Distributed by: Warner Bros. Productions; The Vitaphone Corporation
- Release date: August 24, 1935
- Running time: 7 minutes
- Country: United States
- Language: English

Buddy the Gee Man is a 1935 American animated comedy short film directed by Jack King. The short was released on August 24, 1935. It is the 60th film in the Looney Tunes series and the 23rd and final cartoon to feature Buddy, after which he was replaced by Beans.

== Plot ==
In Washington, D.C., at the Department of Justice, an agent rushes a letter off to federal agent Buddy's house at Kansas City, Missouri. Buddy opens the letter and reads his order: "Conduct secret investigation as to the treatment accorded prisoners by Warden at Sing-Song Prison." Donning a false mustache and his cap, Buddy spits on a horseshoe and tosses it behind him, ony to see that he had broken a mirror. Shrugging it off, he leaves with his dog, which is dressed like Sherlock Holmes, to the police station. From the station, two officers are taking criminal Machine Gun Mike to Sing-Song. There is a great commotion amongst a gathered throng. Buddy and his dog travel on the back of the police car.

A troupe of motorcycles precedes the car as it rolls past the gates of the prison. Buddy spies on the dog warden Otto B. Kinder, who maintains a draconian hold on the prisoners' rights. When the prisoners sing, the Warden orders them to be silent. The Warden also orders silence from Machine Gun Mike and a fellow prisoner exchanging letters. He gives a mallet to a lazy prisoner supposed to be smashing rocks, instead tapping out "London Bridge Is Falling Down", only to be accidentally smacked in the head by the mallet. Another prisoner is attempting to propel himself from the prison by means of a cannon, but is given a pick-axe.

Buddy rushes off to a typewriter and writes a letter to his superior. Some time later, he is made warden of the prison, where he rehabilitates criminals with music and encourages them with free ice cream. Machine Gun Mike is pardoned, but he does not mind being in prison and burns the paper. Commoners begin to rush into the prison so Buddy closes it down and denotes a lack of vacancy.
