= Bars and Stripes Forever =

1939 film by Ben Hardaway and Cal Dalton

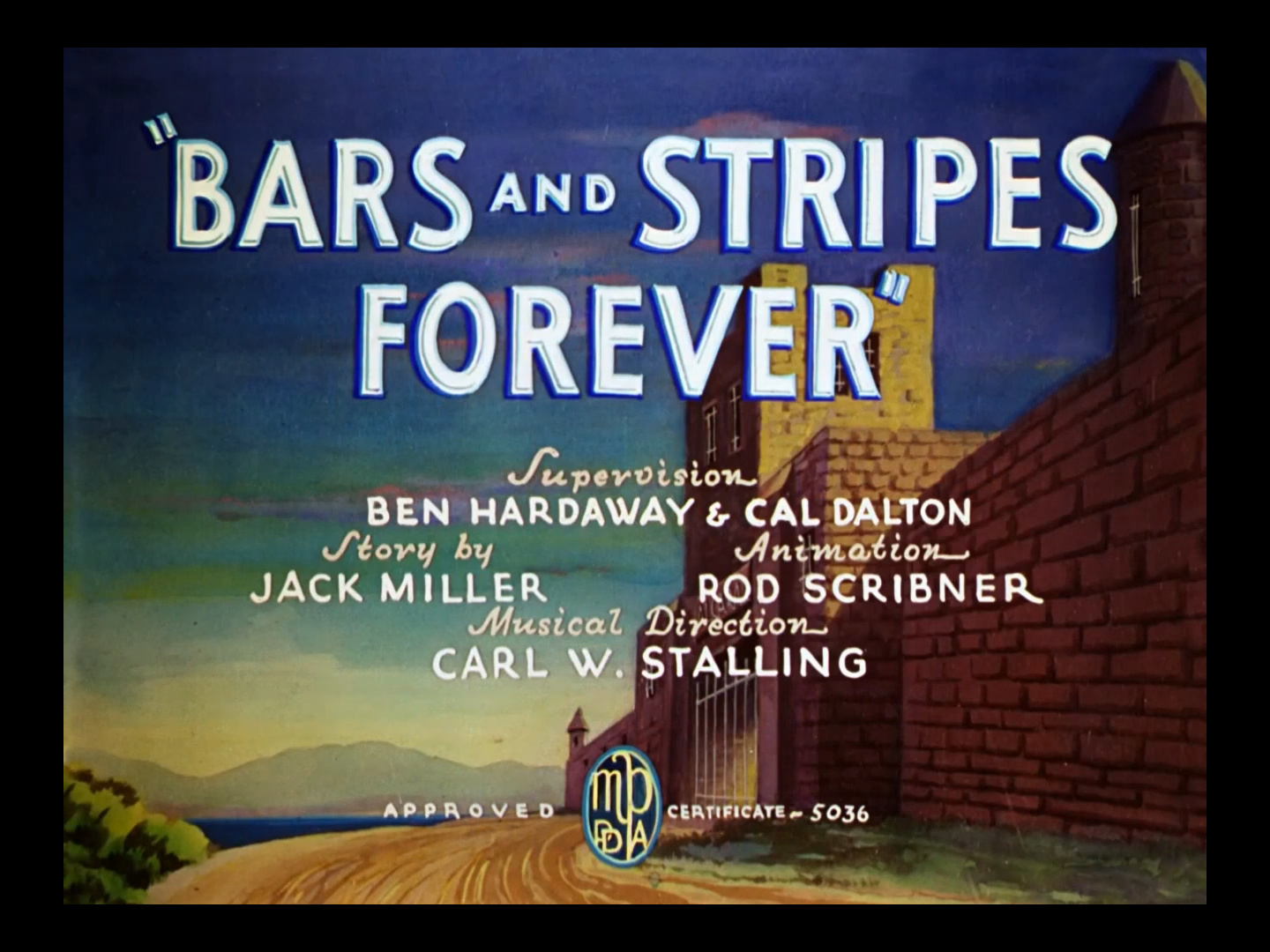
- Title card
- Directed by: Ben Hardaway; Cal Dalton
- Story by: Jack Miller
- Produced by: Leon Schlesinger
- Starring: Mel Blanc
- Music by: Carl W. Stalling
- Animation by: Rod Scribner
- Color process: Technicolor
- Production company: Leon Schlesinger Productions
- Distributed by: Warner Bros. Pictures; The Vitaphone Corporation
- Release date: April 8, 1939
- Running time: 7:45
- Country: United States
- Language: English

Bars and Stripes Forever is a 1939 American animated comedy short film directed by Ben Hardaway and Cal Dalton. It was released on April 8, 1939. It is part of the Merrie Melodies series. It is the first cartoon to credit Rod Scribner, who would become one of the studio's most prominent animators. It is now in the public domain due to copyright owner United Artists neglecting to renew its copyright in 1968.

== Plot ==
The film

An isolated all-dog prison named Alcarazz is shown, where dog criminals sleep in boredom. A criminal tries to break out while the guard is distracted by a brute next to him, so the brute manipulates the guard to knock out the criminal.

Warden Paws nonchalantly monitors the inmates, including one who digs a hole in an attempt to escape, but convinces Paws that it is not his work. A criminal keeps a jailbird as company. Another criminal is dragged to what seems to be an electric chair for a death sentence, only to find out that it is merely a barber's appointment.

The criminal and the brute mop the floor, with the brute throwing a mop at another warden as an insult. He convinces the warden to knock out the criminal with threats. However, he goads the criminal to throw the ball and chain at the warden, which he fails and tries to play coy with, only to accidentally throw the ball and form a hole which he falls into. At lunch time, the brute spreads news of a revolt by mentioning its time, only for the criminal to leak it to the warden and be knocked out again. As the criminals reveal hidden firearms and start a shooting, the brute utilizes an intricate musical number to lock up the two wardens before he escapes through an open door with the other wardens' "approval", which turns out to be a trap as they had opened the exit and constructed a safehouse for the purpose of deterring escapees. The brute is forced into solitary confinement as punishment for his escape, but finds a way to frame the criminal again, only for the criminal to beat himself up in a less painful manner, as he had anticipated it after multiple failures.

== Home media ==
This short is available on disc 1 of the Looney Tunes Collector's Vault: Volume 1 Blu-ray set.
