= Buddy (Looney Tunes) =

Warner Bros. theatrical cartoon character

- Looney Tunes character
- The opening card used in 1934, with Buddy introducing one of his cartoons
- First appearance: Buddy's Day Out (Looney Tunes, 1933)
- Last appearance: "The Warners' 65th Anniversary Special" (Animaniacs, 1994)
- Created by: Tom Palmer
- Voiced by: Bernard B. Brown (1933–1934); Jack Carr (1934–1935); Jackie Morrow (1934–1935); Tommy Bond (1935); Jim Cummings (1994)

In-universe information
- Species: Human
- Gender: Male
- Nationality: American

Buddy is an animated cartoon character created by Tom Palmer for Leon Schlesinger Productions. He was the second star of the Looney Tunes series, after Bosko, of which he serves as a replacement. Buddy was relatively unpopular and is retrospectively considered to be the worst star in the series, leading to the series pivoting towards funny animal protagonists such as Beans and Porky Pig.

== History ==
Buddy was created as a replacement for Bosko after their creator, animators Hugh Harman and Rudolf Ising, severed their relations with producer Leon Schlesinger and left for The Van Beuren Corporation. Without his animators and Bosko, the star character they had taken with them, Schlesinger was desperate to build his own studio and maintain his contract with Warner Bros. Pictures. He recruited several animators from other studios, among them Tom Palmer of Walt Disney Productions. Schlesinger told his new employees to create a star character for the studio, and Palmer created Buddy in 1933, with his first film Buddy's Day Out released on September 9.The character had a troubled beginning, as Warner Bros. refused to accept his first two cartoons, resulting in Palmer being fired and Friz Freleng being hired to re-edit and condense them into a single short.

In the book Of Mice and Magic: A History of American Animated Cartoons, animator Bob Clampett is quoted as describing Buddy as "Bosko in whiteface". Despite these initial problems, Buddy would go on to be the studio's marquee character for the next two years.

Music dominates in Buddy's world. The characters add visuals to the soundtrack and participate in gags. Buddy is usually accompanied in his films by his flapper girlfriend, Cookie, and his dog, Towser. The character would go on to star in 23 short films from 1933 to 1935, before he was retired to make way for a new character called Beans the Cat. Beans became the third Looney Tunes star, though later on replaced by the more popular Porky Pig. Buddy's voice was performed primarily by animator Jack Carr.

Buddy had various designs throughout the course of his career. Initially, the character was a younger boy with trousers, a polo shirt, and a large cap, as seen in Buddy's Day Out. In Buddy's Beer Garden, he was redesigned by Earl Duvall into a young man wearing a jacket with a small bow tie and long pants. Friz Freleng gave the character another design, which was nearly identical to Duvall's except he is smaller and does not wear a jacket. Ben Hardaway later redesigned Buddy to look more like his predecessor, Bosko.

== Reception ==
In That's All, Folks! The Art of Warner Bros. Animation, Steve Schneider describes Buddy as "a creature of limitless blandness", and calls Buddy's Day Out "a nondescript adventure spree". Schneider says that "probably the best of the run is his farewell film, Buddy the Gee Man", but "about the most that can be said for Buddy is that he is distinctly forgettable".

Chuck Jones was promoted from an in-betweener to an animator on the Buddy series. He later claimed he was inexperienced at the time, but joked: "Fortunately, nothing in the way of bad animation could make Buddy any worse than he was anyway."

== Filmography ==
Film	Release date
Buddy's Day Out	September 9, 1933
Buddy's Beer Garden	November 18, 1933
Buddy's Show Boat	December 9, 1933
Buddy the Gob	January 5, 1934
Buddy and Towser	February 24, 1934
Buddy's Garage	April 14, 1934
Buddy's Trolley Troubles	May 5, 1934
Buddy of the Apes	May 26, 1934
Buddy's Bearcats	June 16, 1934
Buddy's Circus	August 25, 1934
Buddy the Detective	September 15, 1934
Viva Buddy	September 29, 1934
Buddy the Woodsman	October 20, 1934
Buddy's Adventures	November 17, 1934
Buddy the Dentist	December 15, 1934
Buddy of the Legion	January 9, 1935
Buddy's Theater	February 8, 1935
Buddy's Pony Express	March 9, 1935
Buddy in Africa	April 13, 1935
Buddy's Lost World	May 18, 1935
Buddy's Bug Hunt	June 6, 1935
Buddy Steps Out	July 6, 1935
Buddy the Gee Man	August 24, 1935

== Modern appearances ==
- Buddy appears in the Animaniacs episode "The Warners' 65th Anniversary Special", voiced by Jim Cummings. This version is a former colleague of the Warner siblings Yakko, Wakko, and Dot, who were created to make his cartoons more interesting. After being dropped in favor of the Warners, Buddy found work as a nut farmer in Ojai, California. He has harbored a long-standing grudge against them for ruining his film career and attempts to kill them, but his plan backfires.
- A collection of animation cels from Buddy's Day Out is the focus of a 2010 episode of History Detectives.
