= Buddy's Adventures =

1934 film by Ben Hardaway

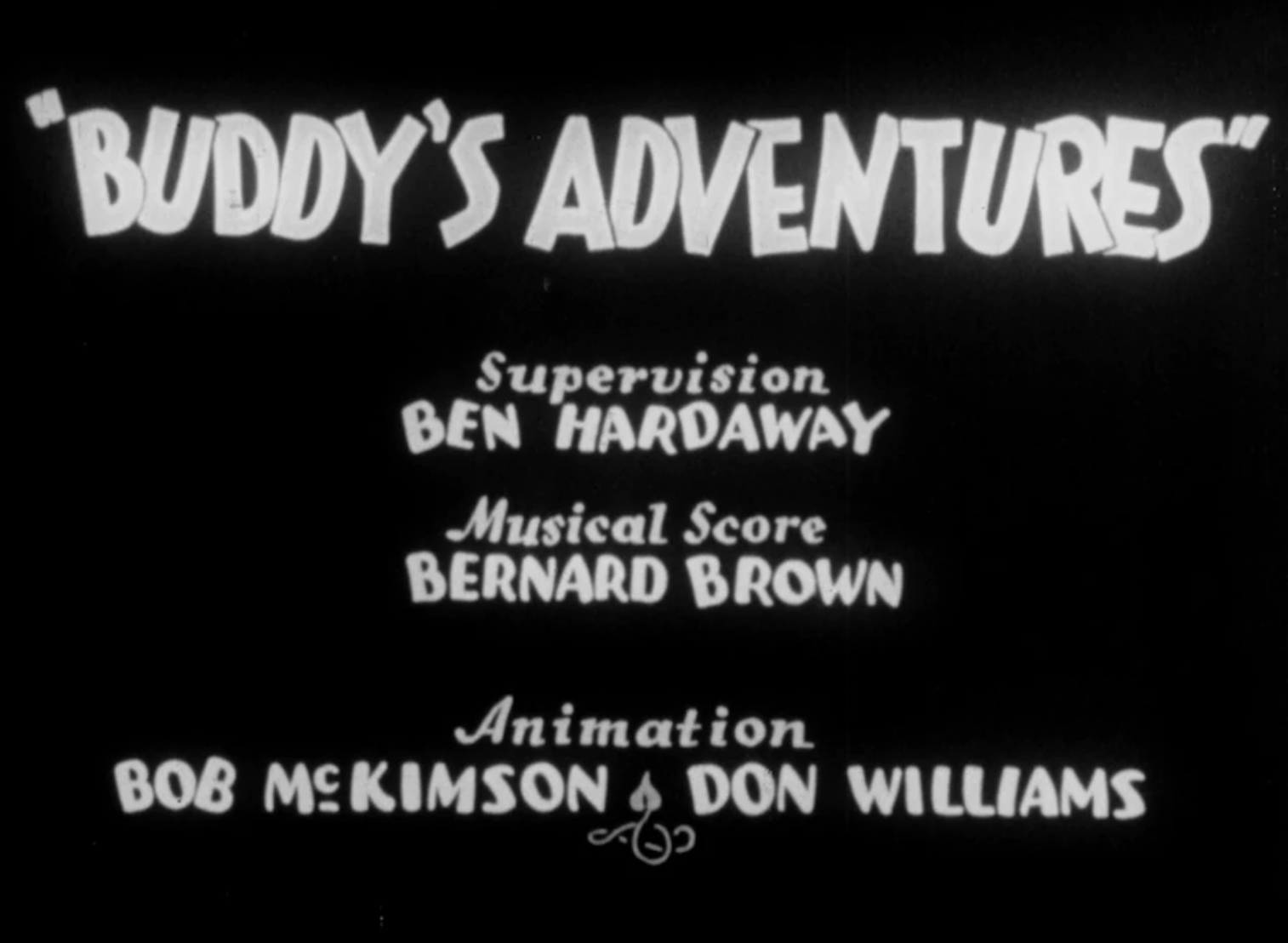
- Title card
- Directed by: Ben Hardaway
- Produced by: Leon Schlesinger
- Starring: Billy Bletcher; Jackie Morrow; The Guardsmen; Jack Carr
- Music by: Bernard Brown
- Animation by: Bob McKimson; Don Williams
- Color process: Black and white
- Production company: Leon Schlesinger Productions
- Distributed by: Warner Bros. Productions; The Vitaphone Corporation
- Release date: November 17, 1934
- Running time: 7 minutes
- Country: United States
- Language: English

Buddy's Adventures is a 1934 American animated comedy short film directed by Ben Hardaway. The short was released on November 17, 1934. It is the 51st film in the Looney Tunes series and the thirteenth cartoon to feature Buddy.

== Plot ==
Buddy and Cookie float through a terrible thunderstorm in a hot air balloon, with Buddy claiming they will arrive at Mars. After lightning strikes, Buddy claims it to be flatulence, despite being equally scared as Cookie. The storm literally comes to life and pummels the hot air balloon repeatedly. Lightning strikes again and severs the hot air balloon, sending the duo tumbling into a mysterious land.

The anchor drags a passing dodo as they crash land into Sourtown, Lemonia. Cookie is angered by Buddy's foolish actions, only for the duo to find out that Lemonia is a dystopia where no laughter, singing, dancing and jazz music are allowed. Buddy does not take the rules seriously, but is appalled when he spots Laurel and Hardy in the stocks for smiling and laughing, along with a tiny bird (another Laurel) similarly imprisoned for singing. Three men drink vinegar and recite a poem outside "Ye Pessimist's Club". Buddy plays the mandolin and sings, while Cookie dances, attracting the attention of nearby animals and plants, who are punished by their owners. Buddy and Cookie are swiftly apprehended and brought to the country's king Sourpan.

Sourpan juices lemons with the crown atop his head to drink lemon juice, further souring his countenance. The two are punished by spanking, but Buddy quickly pulls out his harmonica to play a jazz number. As Cookie dances to the tune, the guards and eventually the king begins to appreciate the music, dancing to the music and forces himself to be spanked. Buddy is crowned king with Cookie as his consort, while the townsfolk and country as a whole becomes joyful and lively.
