= Buddy's Garage =

1934 film by Earl Duvall

- Title card
- Directed by: Earl Duvall
- Produced by: Leon Schlesinger
- Starring: Bernard Brown; Billy Bletcher
- Music by: Bernard Brown
- Animation by: Jack King; Sandy Walker
- Color process: Black-and-white
- Production company: Leon Schlesinger Productions
- Distributed by: Warner Bros. Pictures; The Vitaphone Corporation
- Release date: April 14, 1934
- Running time: 7 minutes
- Country: United States
- Language: English

Buddy's Garage is a 1934 American animated comedy short film directed by Earl Duvall. The short was released on April 14, 1934. It is the 44th film in the Looney Tunes series and the sixth cartoon to feature Buddy, as well as the final to be directed by Duvall.

== Plot ==
Buddy operates a garage and happily mends a tire. A car washes itself while Buddy the mechanic squirts oil into all of the necessary sockets. A sleeping dog is used to inflate a tire, which is unfortunately popped by a passing mosquito. The dog eats the mosquito, but it easily flies out to the dog's chagrin.

Buddy plays "By a Waterfall" on a series of files as if they were a xylophone, until Cookie appears with Buddy's lunch. Buddy grinds the skin off of a pineapple, cracks the shells of walnuts with a monkey wrench, and attempts to inflate a small chicken to greater proportions, only for it to explode and reveal absolutely no flesh to have been inside.

A brute drives up to the garage for a fill-up. Buddy does his job while the brute goes to the restroom and finds Cookie applying makeup, deciding to abduct her instantly. Buddy chases him and is trapped after the brute is hit by an electrical drill by Cookie and brings her to her vehicle. Buddy chases the brute in a tow truck. The brute meats a closed road and his car jumps over the barrier like a horse, while Buddy straight up runs over it. The brute runs over a toolbox, with two saws conveniently sticking on the wheels and cutting off Buddy's path. Buddy lands in the water and emerges with a fish hooked to the tail, which is later mauled to death by cats which follow the truck.

Buddy runs over a laundry truck as well as a house, bringing with him lingerie and two sleeping children who are thrown off instantly. He catches up to Cookie and tows her to his truck, as well as towing the brute to behind the car, where he is painfully hit with obstacles and exhaust fumes as punishment.
