= Buddy's Theatre =

1935 film by Ben Hardaway

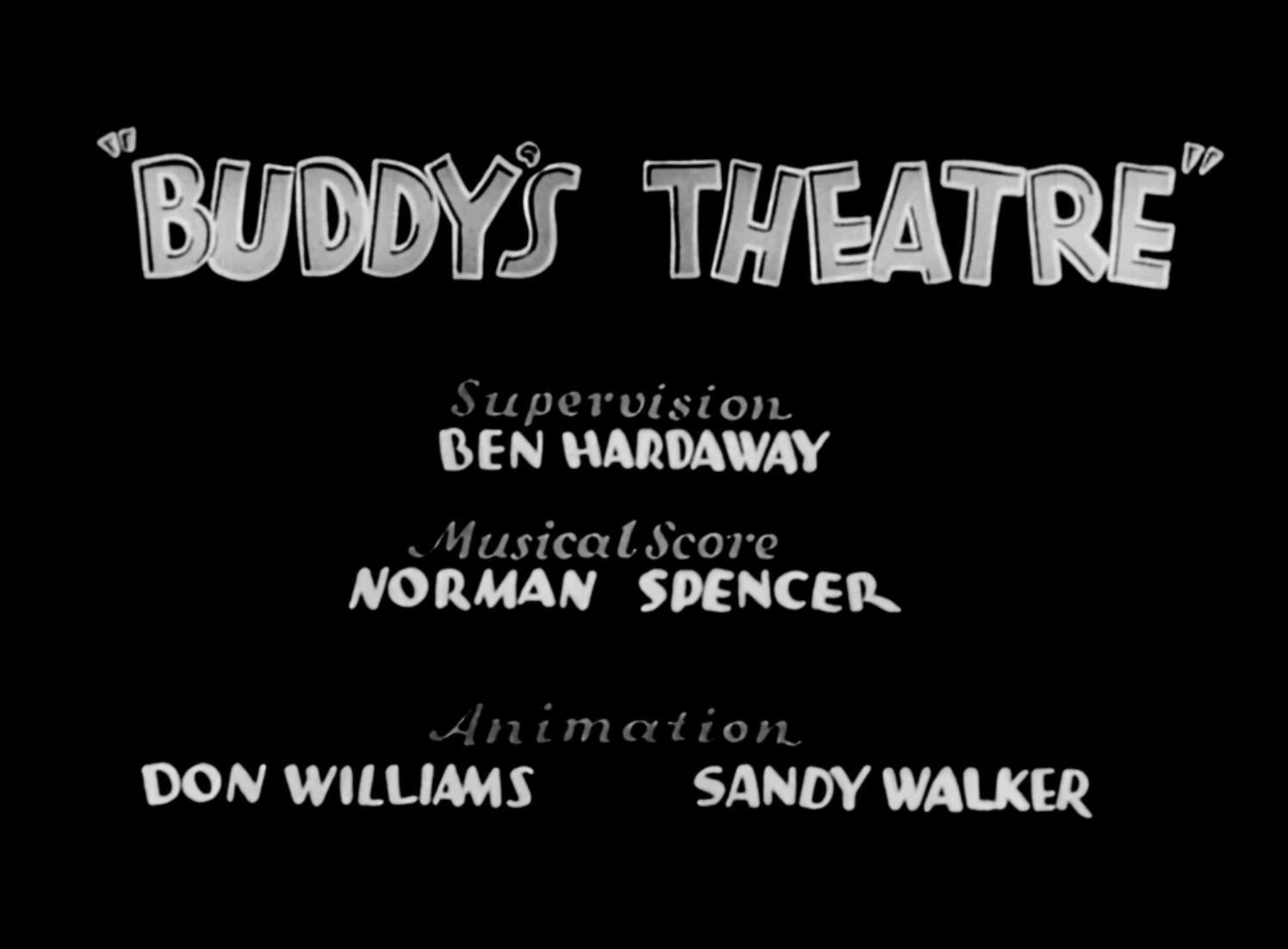
- Title card
- Directed by: Ben Hardaway
- Produced by: Leon Schlesinger
- Starring: Jack Carr; Bernice Hansen
- Music by: Norman Spencer
- Animation by: Don Williams; Sandy Walker
- Color process: Black-and-white
- Production company: Leon Schlesinger Productions
- Distributed by: Warner Bros. Pictures; The Vitaphone Corporation
- Release date: April 1, 1935
- Running time: 7 minutes
- Language: English

Buddy's Theatre is an American animated comedy short film directed by Ben Hardaway. It was first released on April 1, 1935. It is the 54th film in the Looney Tunes series and the seventeenth cartoon to feature Buddy.

== Plot ==
Buddy operates a movie theater which a large number of the public attend. As Buddy distributes tickets and answers the telephone, a small child ingests the entire roll of tickets, leaving Buddy to use the child as a disburser until he is out of tickets. He gives the child a lollipop as compensation when the child starts to cry.

Buddy picks up several reels of film to take up to the projection room, but fails to open the door of the room; when he does open the door, he is flung backwards and slides down the stair handles to a nearby drinking fountain, where the film reels stack neatly. One patron sitting near the aisle is continually annoyed by other patrons wishing to pass him and sit in the same row, so he angrily rips his mounted seat out of the ground and moves into the aisle.

The showing starts with a newsreel. In Italy, Prime Minister "Mausoleum" (Benito Mussolini) has lowered the mandatory age for military service, recruiting literal children. In "Liverpill", England, an early business recovery was demonstrated as a national dollar day attracting thousands of shoppers, revealed to be actually be stereotypical African natives. In "Yodel", Switzerland, the Swiss navy launches the nation's newest battle cruiser, which sinks in no time. The reel breaks during the ending card, so Buddy mends it by hammering a staple into it.

The next film reel advertises "Coming Attractions", an advertisement for a film advertised as "The Smash Hit of the Century (three years in the remaking)". "It's Gigantic!" announces the painted wings of an approaching plane. "It's Stupendous!" "It's Colossal!" "It's Super-Colossal!" "In fact," says a plane that falls, unceremoniously, to the earth, "it's almost mediocre." The film is revealed to be James Bagknee (James Cagney)'s 'Here Comes the Gravy', during the final scene of which a warship's cannon literally fires at the audience. The advertisements and local snipes continue, and finally, we come to "The Chinchilla", the film within a film starring Cookie, a parody of Warner Bros.' own Vitaphone films.

Cookie sits at a piano, playing "How High Can a Little Bird Fly?" when an ape comes through her window; the ape becomes trapped in the piano, while Cookie is trapped by her shirt on a tree branch. In a poorly choreographed segment, the camera shifts to an actual ape tied to the room, so Buddy uses an open film reel to swing into the stage and kick the ape, re-emerging with a wooden plank to defeat the ape. Buddy takes a step ladder to rescue her, but falls forward onto the screen, knocking him out as the entire film has been revealed to be a ruse.
