= Buddy of the Legion =

1935 film by Ben Hardaway

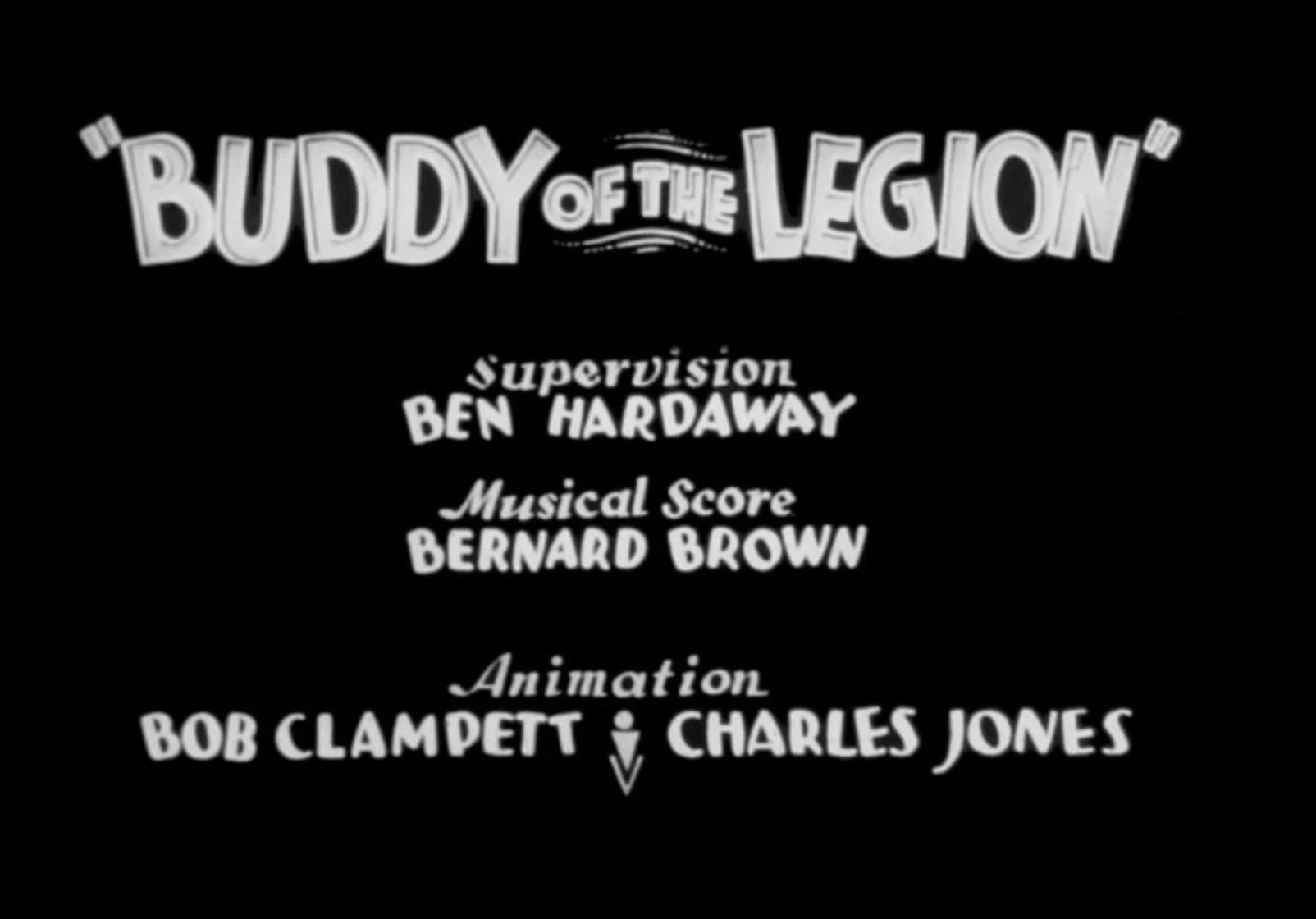
- Title card
- Directed by: Ben Hardaway
- Produced by: Leon Schlesinger
- Starring: Billy Bletcher; The Guardsmen
- Music by: Bernard Brown
- Animation by: Bob Clampett; Charles Jones
- Color process: Black-and-white
- Production company: Leon Schlesinger Productions
- Distributed by: Warner Bros. Productions; The Vitaphone Corporation
- Release date: April 6, 1935
- Running time: 7 minutes
- Country: United States
- Language: English

Buddy of the Legion is an American animated comedy short film directed by Ben Hardaway. It was released on April 6, 1935. It is the 55th film in the Looney Tunes series and the eighteenth cartoon to feature Buddy, as well as the first film in the series to credit both Bob Clampett and Chuck Jones, who would become the series' most prominent directors in decades.

== Plot ==
Buddy finds a bookstore in need of a worker. He immediately notifies the owner of the shop, who hires him dismissively and kicks him out for distracting her work. He is assigned to dust the store (including the cat and goldfish), as well as to take care of the store while the owner leaves. He tries to carry a stack of books to a bookshelf, but is distracted by a bee on his nose and runs into a stove. As the books collapse, he accidentally finds a book about the French Foreign Legion. He sits down at a desk and is so engrossed in reading he daydreams about impersonating the book's protagonist.

In the daydream, Buddy imagines himself to be the leader of a detachment of the Legion marching through the Arabian Desert. At an Amazon-inhabited fortress, women force captive Legion soldiers to do hard labor work. One pushes a quern-stone and is whipped; one washes laundry with water provided by a wheel turned by the efforts of a third man, who, for his lazy walking, is shot into speeding up. One Amazon, looking through a spy-glass, sees the legionnaires, and announces their coming to the leader.

The leader calls for an attractive genie woman. The genie travels by magic carpet to the Legion's location, where she enamors all of the soldiers but Buddy and leads them to the fortress to be knocked out. Buddy notices their disappearances and rushes to the fortress, where he unintentionally makes the guard break the door due to his smaller stature than his peers. He discovers the captive soldier and dodges a sneak attack, which shatters the guard's blade. Buddy hides in a fireplace, causing the chasing guard to be stuck, so he slams the fireplace's gate on the guard's buttocks. He is chased to a well where he uses the bucket to knock out four guards, earning cheers from the captive soldiers, but he is choked by a final guard, revealed in reality to be the shop's owner, who has returned and is displeased by Buddy's laziness. Buddy is immediately fired, but he is nonchalant about it and walks away.
