= Buddy the Dentist =

1934 film by Ben Hardaway

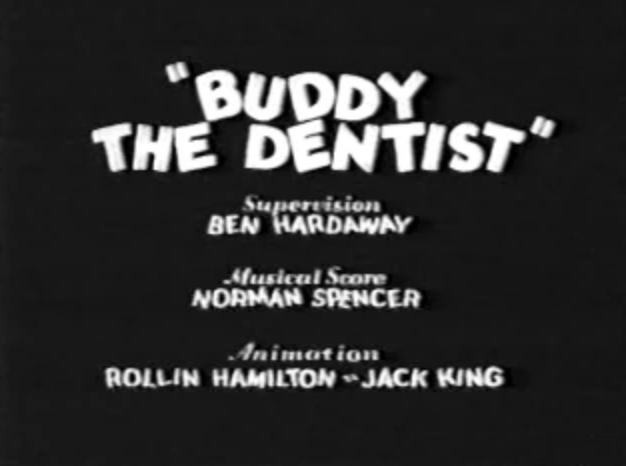
- Title card
- Directed by: Ben Hardaway
- Produced by: Leon Schlesinger
- Starring: Bernice Hansen
- Music by: Norman Spencer
- Animation by: Rollin Hamilton; Jack King
- Color process: Black-and-white
- Production company: Leon Schlesinger Productions
- Distributed by: Warner Bros. Productions; The Vitaphone Corporation
- Release date: December 15, 1934
- Running time: 7 minutes
- Country: United States
- Language: English

Buddy the Dentist is a 1934 American animated comedy short film directed by Ben Hardaway. The short was released on December 15, 1934. It is the 53rd film in the Looney Tunes series and the fifteenth cartoon to feature Buddy.

== Plot ==
Buddy is preparing fudge for his girlfriend Cookie. When he walks away from his stove for a moment, Towser burns his tongue attempting to taste the mixture. Buddy returns with a tube to squirt the fudge onto a pan, disregarding the odd behavior of his pet. As he arranges the fudge on a pan, he tosses some into Towser's mouth while lecturing the dog on how harmful candy can be to a dog's teeth.

Buddy orders the dog to sit and tells him to be quiet as he calls Cookie to give her tidings of the treat he has prepared for her. The two discuss vanilla (which Buddy always uses for fudge). Meanwhile, Towser wanders off, back to the kitchen, and spills the fudge all over the floor, then eating it and, true to Buddy's admonition, causing a sharp spike to hurt his teeth. The dog yelps in pain, Buddy yells, "Shut up!" which Cookie misinterprets as being directed towards her, so she hangs up angrily.

Buddy walks into the kitchen, finds his fudge ruined and Towser hiding under a table. Buddy pulls the dog out from under the table and tells him that "candy would hurt his teeth." Buddy attempts to remove his dog's loose tooth with pliers. Discovering "Dr. Mohler: Painless Dentist's" calendar, Buddy has an idea to use nitrous oxide. Buddy attaches a gas pipe with a mouthpiece to Towser's mouth, and the dog inflates and floats upward. Buddy gets him down with a vacuum cleaner, which then explodes, trapping Buddy in an ironing board compartment. Buddy next decides to tie one end of a string to a dog toy, the other to Towser's damaged tooth. When that only serves to amuse the animal, Buddy decides to tie up the tooth and tie the other end of the string to a doorknob, the closing action of the door then serving to force the loose tooth from the dog's gums.

Towser is trepidatious, but Buddy is preparing to demonstrate how little the method hurts when a domestic cat comes in. The feline spooks the dog so much that Towser, still attached by the string to Buddy, chases the creature out of the house. They go through fountains until Buddy becomes trapped in a toy wagon. The cat gets away, but Buddy and his dog become trapped in a hammock occupied by Cookie. All three emerge from the fallen hammock and Buddy discovers that he has the troubled tooth, but Cookie, only mildly disgusted, finds a tooth clearly missing from Buddy's mouth.
