= Buddy's Bearcats =

1934 film by Jack King

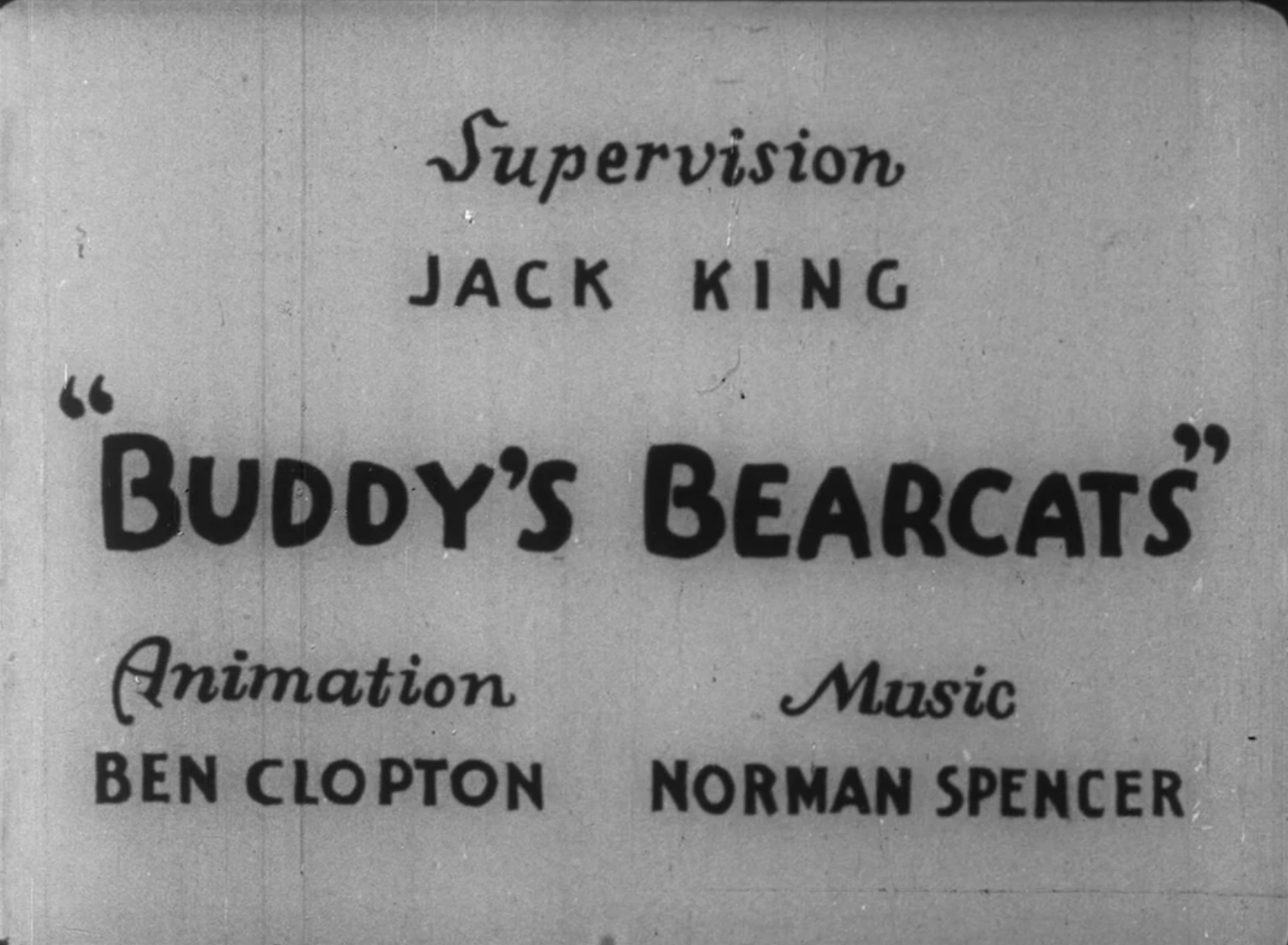
- Title card
- Directed by: Jack King
- Produced by: Leon Schlesinger
- Starring: Billy Bletcher
- Music by: Norman Spencer
- Animation by: Ben Clopton
- Color process: Black-and-white
- Production company: Leon Schlesinger Productions
- Distributed by: Warner Bros. Pictures; The Vitaphone Corporation
- Release date: June 23, 1934
- Running time: 7 minutes
- Country: United States
- Language: English

Buddy's Bearcats is a 1934 American animated comedy short film directed by Jack King. The short was released on June 23, 1934. It is the 47th film in the Looney Tunes series, the ninth cartoon to feature Buddy and the first to be directed by King.

== Plot ==
Buddy leads the baseball team Bearcats, and they are up against the Battling Bruisers". As the public buys tickets to watch the match, an obese man is forced to buy two tickets to be accommodated while two old bearded men shrink to sneak into the arena. A young man peeks through the cracks, unknowingly helping scratch a dachshund with his buttocks. Two men try to peek through holes and adjusting each other's holes so they wouldn't be able to see it to each other's chagrin. The young man from earlier is lifted up to the top of the fence by a passerby using the dachshund. Two Scottish men ties a set of bagpipes to a drum to use it as a hot air balloon and climb over the fence.

As the match starts, an unusually blond Cookie greets Buddy. Buddy plays a set of bats as if they were a xylophone, then catches the ball in his back pocket. As the food vendors sell amenities, a very musical announcer introduces the two teams in comedic fashion. The game begins, narrated by a parody of Joe E. Brown, who swallows a foul ball thrown in his direction by Buddy. Meanwhile, a Bruiser squirts oil under his arms and throws a pitch to Buddy, in accordance to the manipulation of a bird in a cage worn by a player, but Buddy nevertheless hits the ball and moves to second base for a double.

Buddy then wind the ball up like a toy and throws it in an incredibly erratic manner, causing the Bruiser to injure another player and irrationally using bug spray in an attempt to hit it, only to have his successful hit caught by a Bearcat with a retractable arm. An outfielder immediately catches the ball in deep left with a mechanical glove. The match eventually reaches a 49 to 47 score, causing Buddy to fall into a nervous breakdown, but is convinced by Cookie to face it with confidence. Buddy hits a home run and is buried by the public's hats while he and Cookie celebrate their victory.
