= Buddy of the Apes =

1934 film by Ben Hardaway

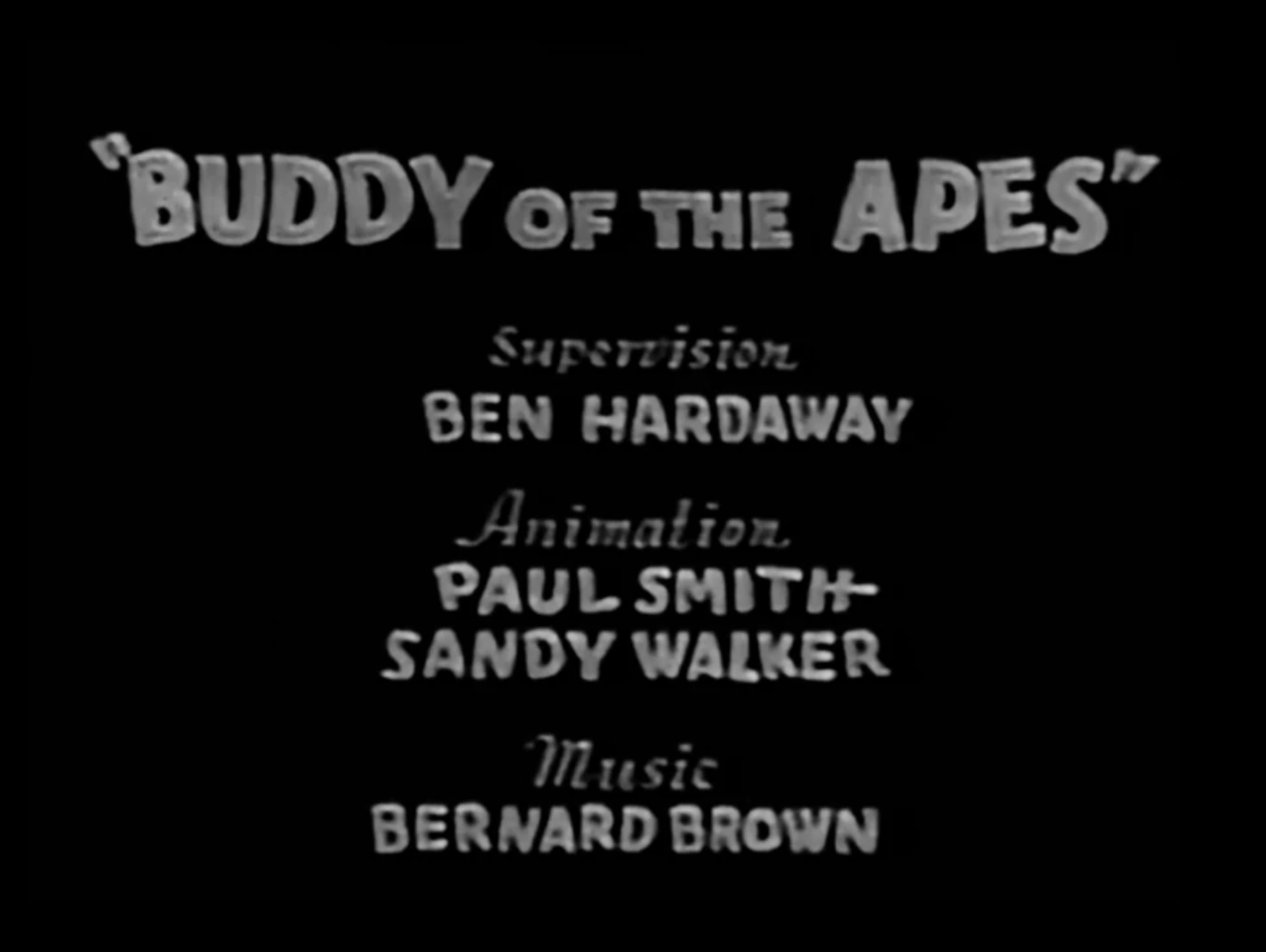
- Title card
- Directed by: Ben Hardaway
- Produced by: Leon Schlesinger
- Starring: Billy Bletcher; Bernard Brown
- Music by: Bernard Brown
- Animation by: Paul Smith; Sandy Walker
- Color process: Black-and-white
- Production company: Leon Schlesinger Productions
- Distributed by: Warner Bros. Pictures; The Vitaphone Corporation
- Release date: May 26, 1934
- Running time: 7 minutes
- Country: United States
- Language: English

Buddy of the Apes is a 1934 American animated comedy short film directed by Ben Hardaway. The short was released on May 26, 1934. It is the 46th film in the Looney Tunes series, the eighth cartoon to feature Buddy and the first to be directed by Hardaway, who would eventually help create Bugs Bunny at the studio as well as Woody Woodpecker.

== Plot ==
Buddy impersonates Tarzan. He does a Tarzan yell before swinging between trees. He washes himself with the water from an elephant's trunk and brushes his teeth with a reed alongside other animals, who help each other brush their teeth. A female ape feeds her child coconut milk and walks away, motivating the young ape to shake his crib and fall into the river to his mother's horror. Buddy, also drinking coconut milk, saves him by using his dagger to reach the floating crib and pull it ashore. Buddy dances with the animals while the female ape scolds her child.

A stereotypical Black man from a nearby village catches sight and alerts his peers. Their chief commands them to attack Buddy and the young ape. Buddy again yells loudly, commanding an elephant to shoot rocks like a machine gun. Buddy bites a thrown spear and throws it back, locking the thrower onto a tree with his nose ring. A kangaroo finds him and hits him like a punching bag; the native's child attempts to kick the kangaroo's crotch, only to be punched by her child in the same manner. Monkeys use a hippo and pelican to bombard the natives and their chief with coconuts. The chief's buttocks is hit repeatedly by spikes from a porcupine, then is jumped by Buddy who incapacitates him and is crowned king of the jungle.
