= Ben Hardaway =

American animator (1895–1957)

- Hardaway in the 1940s
- Born: Joseph Benson Hardaway; May 21, 1895; Belton, Missouri, U.S.
- Died: February 5, 1957 (aged 61); Los Angeles, California, U.S.
- Occupations: Storyboard artist; animator; voice actor; gagman; writer; director
- Years active: 1912 – 1917; 1920 – 1956
- Employer(s): Kansas City Post (1915–1917; 1920–1923); Kansas City Film Ad Service (1923–1929); Walt Disney Productions (1932); Animated Pictures (1932–1933); Leon Schlesinger Productions (1933–1940); Warner Bros. Cartoons (1948–1949); Walter Lantz Productions (1940–1949); Tempe-Toons (1956)
- Children: 1
- Military career
- Branch: US Army
- Service years: 1917–1919
- Unit: U.S. Army Field Artillery Branch
- Commands: Battery D, 129th Field Artillery Regiment, 35th Infantry Division
- Conflicts: World War I

Joseph Benson Hardaway (May 21, 1895 – February 5, 1957) was an American storyboard artist, animator, voice actor, gagman, writer and director for several American animation studios during the golden age of American animation. He was sometimes credited as J. B. Hardaway, Ben Hardaway, B. Hardaway and Bugs Hardaway. He fought in World War I in the 129th Field Artillery Regiment, Battery D.

== Army service ==
Hardaway enlisted in World War I on June 4, 1917, and was discharged on April 9, 1919, serving for 26 months in total. He was led in the 129th Field Artillery Regiment by future President of the United States Harry S. Truman, in which he attended his reception planned by Forrest Smith at the Shoreham Hotel in 1949 and his inauguration, following him being re-elected. Hardaway served the last 14 months of his service in France.

External audio
- A Tribute to Franklin D. Roosevelt and Harry S. Truman by Betty Phillips and J.B. Hardaway, 6:11, Harry S. Truman Library Museum

== Artistic career ==
Hardaway started his career at the Kansas City Post as a cartoonist and in 1921, illustrated a book by James W. Earp called Boomer Jones, a character created in the late 1910s by Earp, before eventually going into the animation business, working for the Kansas City Film Ad Service. He later worked for the Walt Disney Productions animation unit and Animated Pictures Corp., after which Hardaway was hired by the Leon Schlesinger studio as a gagman for the Friz Freleng unit. He was promoted to director for seven Buddy animated shorts. Afterwards he resumed working as a gagman and storyman. He started receiving film credits in 1937. His writing credits include Daffy Duck & Egghead and The Penguin Parade.

While at the Schlesinger/Warner Bros. studio during the late 1930s, Hardaway served as a storyman. He co-directed several Looney Tunes and Merrie Melodies shorts with Cal Dalton during Freleng's two-year exodus to Metro-Goldwyn-Mayer. Producer Leon Schlesinger needed a replacement for Freleng, Frank Tashlin taking over Freleng's unit, and Hardaway's previous experience in the job resulted in his promotion. Dalton's original co-director was storymen Cal Howard, before he left for Fleischer Studios. In 1938, Hardaway co-directed Porky's Hare Hunt, the first film to feature a rabbit. When this unnamed, embryonic rabbit was given a new model sheet for a later short, since, according to Chuck Jones, Hardaway "didn't draw it very well", designer Charlie Thorson inadvertently offered a permanent name by titling the model sheet "Bugs' Bunny" since it was meant for Hardaway's unit. By the time the rabbit was redesigned and refined for the film A Wild Hare, the name was already being used in relation to the character in studio publicity materials. The name Bugs' Bunny shows up in comics and merchandise as late as 1943.

When Freleng left MGM to return to Warner Bros. in 1939, Hardaway was demoted back to storyman. In 1940, Hardaway joined the staff of Walter Lantz Productions, where he helped Walter Lantz in creating the studio's most famous character, Woody Woodpecker. Hardaway wrote or co-wrote most of the stories for the Woody Woodpecker shorts between late 1940 and early 1951, as well as supplying Woody's voice between 1944 and 1949 (sources claiming that Hardaway was the first person to succeed Mel Blanc as Woody's voice after Blanc signed an exclusive contract with Warner Bros. are incorrect: Danny Webb, Kent Rogers, and Dick Nelson provided the voice of Woody between Blanc and Hardaway).

Shamus Culhane, the director of most of the Woody cartoons between 1944 and 1946, thought Hardaway's humor was crude and formulaic. Nevertheless, the collaboration worked, and many consider this the golden era of Woody cartoons. During his second year at Lantz, he wrote the story for Scrub Me Mama with a Boogie Beat; in February 1949, Universal withdrew it from reissue due to multiple complaints from the NAACP for its racist stereotypes of African-Americans. In 1948, Lantz temporarily shut down his studio, and Hardaway would briefly return to Warner Bros., writing the short A Bone for a Bone. When Lantz reopened in 1950, Hardaway did not return, although two shorts he had written before he left were finished with his name appearing on screen for a final time.

== Death ==
Hardaway died from cancer at the age of 61 on February 5, 1957, supposedly as a result of a long-term effect of exposure to chemical weapons during World War I. Most obituaries in newspapers misstated his age as 66, even though he was born in 1895; they noted his creations Bugs Bunny and Woody Woodpecker. The last project he worked on was Adventures of Pow Wow at Tempe-Toons, although he only wrote four episodes, which have lost audio.

== Filmography ==
=== Leon Schlesinger Productions ===
Title	Release Date	Role	Series	Notes
Buddy of the Apes	1934	Director	Looney Tunes	First cartoon directed by Hardaway. Features Buddy.
Rhythm in the Bow	1934	Director	Merrie Melodies	Final Black & White Merrie Melodie, following this short they would all be produced in Technicolor (2-hue until late 1935).
Buddy's Adventures	1934	Director	Looney Tunes	Features Buddy.
Buddy the Dentist	1934	Director	Looney Tunes	Features Buddy.
Buddy of the Legion	1935	Director	Looney Tunes	Features Buddy.
Buddy's Pony Express	1935	Director	Looney Tunes	Features Buddy.
Buddy's Theatre	1935	Director	Looney Tunes	Features Buddy.
Buddy in Africa	1935	Director	Looney Tunes	Final cartoon directed by Hardaway during his first stint as a director. Features Buddy.
Daffy Duck & Egghead	1938	Writer	Merrie Melodies	Features Daffy Duck and Egghead.
The Penguin Parade	1938	Writer	Merrie Melodies	
Porky's Hare Hunt	1938	Director (with Cal Dalton, uncredited)	Looney Tunes	First cartoon co-directed with animator Cal Dalton. First appearance of the rabbit who would become Bugs Bunny. Features Porky Pig.
Love and Curses	1938	Director with Cal Dalton	Merrie Melodies	
Porky the Gob	1938	Director with Cal Dalton	Looney Tunes	Features Porky Pig.
Count Me Out	1938	Director with Cal Dalton	Merrie Melodies	Final appearance of Egghead.
It's an Ill Wind	1939	Director with Cal Dalton	Looney Tunes	Features Porky Pig.
Gold Rush Daze	1939	Director with Cal Dalton	Merrie Melodies	
Bars and Stripes Forever	1939	Director with Cal Dalton	Merrie Melodies	
Porky and Teabiscuit	1939	Director with Cal Dalton	Looney Tunes	Features Porky Pig.
Hobo Gadget Band	1939	Director with Cal Dalton	Merrie Melodies	
Hare-um Scare-um	1939	Director with Cal Dalton	Merrie Melodies	Features the rabbit from Porky's Hare Hunt.
Sioux Me	1939	Director with Cal Dalton	Merrie Melodies	
Fagin's Freshman	1939	Director with Cal Dalton	Merrie Melodies	
Porky the Giant Killer	1939	Director with Cal Dalton	Looney Tunes	
Busy Bakers	1940	Director with Cal Dalton	Merrie Melodies	Final cartoon co-directed with Cal Dalton, final cartoon directed by Hardaway at Schlesinger's studio.
Confederate Honey	1940	Writer	Merrie Melodies	Features Elmer Fudd.
The Bear's Tale	1940	Writer	Merrie Melodies	
Porky's Baseball Broadcast	1940	Writer	Looney Tunes	
Little Blabbermouse	1940	Writer	Merrie Melodies	Final Warner Bros. cartoon written by Hardaway for over a decade. Final Merrie Melodie to be worked on by Hardaway. Features a W. C. Fields caricature which would later be used for Andy Panda's father at the Lantz studio.

=== Walter Lantz Productions ===
Title	Release Date	Role	Series	Notes
Recruiting Daze	1940	Writer with Lowell Elliot	A Walter Lantz Cartune	First cartoon written at Walter Lantz Productions where Hardaway would work until the studio shut down in 1948. First short co-written with Lowell Elliott. Features Punchy.
Knock Knock	1940	Writer with Lowell Elliot	Andy Panda	Debut of Woody Woodpecker (here unnamed). Hardaway applied a similar personality onto the woodpecker that he had developed for the prototypical Bugs Bunny, while at Schlesinger's.
Syncopated Sioux	1940	Writer with Lowell Elliot	A Walter Lantz Cartune	Features Punchy.
Mouse Trappers	1941	Writer	Andy Panda	First short in which Andy Panda's father is based on W. C. Fields.
Fair Today	1941	Writer	A Walter Lantz Cartune	
Scrub Me Mama with a Boogie Beat	1941	Writer	A Walter Lantz Cartune	A precursor to the Swing Symphonies. Has been banned from circulation since 1949.
Hysterical Highspots in American History	1941	Writer	A Walter Lantz Cartune	
Dizzy Kitty	1941	Writer	Andy Panda	
Salt Water Daffy	1941	Writer with Lowell Elliott	A Walter Lantz Cartune	Final appearance of Punchy.
Woody Woodpecker	1941	Writer with Jack Cosgriff	Woody Woodpecker	First Woody Woodpecker short. First short co-written with Jack Cosgriff.
Andy Panda's Pop	1941	Writer with Lowell Elliott	A Walter Lantz Cartune	
The Screwdriver	1941	Writer with Jack Cosgriff (erroneously credited as J. Cosgrove)	Woody Woodpecker	
Boogie Woogie Bugle Boy of Company "B"	1941	Writer with Lowell Elliott	A Walter Lantz Cartune	A precursor to the Swing Symphonies.
Man's Best Friend	1941	Writer with Jack Cosgriff	A Walter Lantz Cartune	Last short co-written with Jack Cosgriff, during his first stint at the studio.
Pantry Panic	1941	Writer with Lowell Elliott	Woody Woodpecker	
$21 a Day (Once a Month)	1941	Writer with Lowell Elliott	Swing Symphony	The first Swing Symphony.
Under the Spreading Blacksmith Shop	1942	Writer with Lowell Elliott	Andy Panda	Final appearance of Andy Panda's father.
The Hollywood Matador	1942	Writer with Lowell Elliott	Woody Woodpecker	
The Hams That Couldn't Be Cured	1942	Writer with Lowell Elliott	Swing Symphony	
Mother Goose on the Loose	1942	Writer with Lowell Elliott	A Walter Lantz Cartune	Final short co-written with Lowell Elliott.
Good-Bye Mr. Moth	1942	Writer with ’Chuck’ Couch	Andy Panda	First short co-written with ‘Chuck’ Couch.
Nutty Pine Cabin	1942	Writer with ’Chuck’ Couch	Andy Panda	
Ace in the Hole	1942	Writer with Milt Schaffer	Woody Woodpecker	First short co-written with Milt Schaffer, whom Hardaway would collaborate with the most during his tenure at the studio.
Juke Box Jamboree	1942	Writer with ‘Chuck’ Couch	Swing Symphony	Last short co-written with ‘Chuck’ Couch.
Pigeon Patrol	1942	Writer with Milt Schaffer	A Walter Lantz Cartune	Debut of Homer Pigeon.
Andy Panda's Victory Garden	1942	Writer with Milt Schaffer	Andy Panda	
Yankee Doodle Swing Shift	1942	Writer with Milt Schaffer	Swing Symphony	
The Loan Stranger	1942	Writer with Milt Schaffer	Woody Woodpecker	
Boogie Woogie Sioux	1942	Writer with Milt Schaffer	Swing Symphony	
Air Raid Warden	1942	Writer with Milt Schaffer	Andy Panda	
Cow-Cow Boogie	1943	Writer with Milt Schaffer	Swing Symphony	
The Screwball	1943	Writer with Milt Schaffer	Woody Woodpecker	
The Egg Cracker Suite	1943	Director with Emery Hawkins	Swing Symphony	First and only cartoon co-directed with Emery Hawkins. Final theatrical cartoon directed by Hardaway. Final theatrical cartoon featuring Oswald Rabbit.
Swing Your Partner	1943	Writer with Milt Schaffer	Swing Symphony	Features Homer Pigeon.
The Dizzy Acrobat	1943	Writer with Milt Schaffer	Woody Woodpecker	
Canine Commandos	1943	Writer with Milt Schaffer	Andy Panda	
Ration Bored	1943	Writer	Woody Woodpecker	
Pass the Biscuits Mirandy!	1943	Writer with Milt Schaffer	Swing Symphony	
Boogie Woogie Man (Will Get You If You Don't Watch Out)	1943	Writer with Milt Schaffer	Swing Symphony	
Meatless Tuesday	1943	Writer with Milt Schaffer	Andy Panda	
The Greatest Man in Siam	1944	Writer with Milt Schaffer	Swing Symphony	
The Barber or Seville	1944	Writer with Milt Schaffer	Woody Woodpecker	First Woody Woodpecker short where Hardaway voices the woodpecker.
Jungle Jive	1944	Writer with Milt Schaffer	Swing Symphony	
Fish Fry	1944	Writer with Milt Schaffer	Andy Panda	
Abou Ben Boogie	1944	Writer with Milt Schaffer	Swing Symphony	
The Beach Nut	1944	Writer with Milt Schaffer	Woody Woodpecker	
Ski For Two	1944	Writer with Milt Schaffer	Woody Woodpecker	
The Painter and the Pointer	1944	Writer with Milt Schaffer	Andy Panda	
The Pied Piper of Basin Street	1945	Writer with Milt Schaffer	Swing Symphony	
Chew-Chew Baby	1945	Writer with Milt Schaffer	Woody Woodpecker	
Sliphorn King of Polaroo	1945	Writer with Milt Schaffer	Swing Symphony	Final Swing Symphony short.
Woody Dines Out	1945	Writer with Milt Schaffer	Woody Woodpecker	
Crow Crazy	1945	Writer with Milt Schaffer	Andy Panda	
The Dippy Diplomat	1945	Writer with Milt Schaffer	Woody Woodpecker	
The Loose Nut	1945	Writer with Milt Schaffer	Woody Woodpecker	
The Poet & Peasant	1946	Writer with Milt Schaffer	Andy Panda	A precursor to the Musical Miniatures.
Mousie Come Home	1946	Writer with Milt Schaffer	Andy Panda	
Apple Andy	1946	Writer with Milt Schaffer	Andy Panda	
Who's Cookin' Who?	1946	Writer with Milt Schaffer	Woody Woodpecker	
Bathing Buddies	1946	Writer with Milt Schaffer	Woody Woodpecker	
The Reckless Driver	1946	Writer with Milt Schaffer	Woody Woodpecker	
Fair Weather Fiends	1946	Writer with Milt Schaffer	Woody Woodpecker	
The Wacky Weed	1946	Writer with Milt Schaffer	Andy Panda	
Musical Moments from Chopin	1947	Writer with Milt Schaffer	Musical Miniatures	First Musical Miniature.
Smoked Hams	1947	Writer with Milt Schaffer	Woody Woodpecker	
The Coo Coo Bird	1947	Writer with Milt Schaffer	Woody Woodpecker	
The Overture to William Tell	1947	Writer with Milt Schaffer	Musical Miniatures	
Well Oiled	1947	Writer with Milt Schaffer	Woody Woodpecker	
Solid Ivory	1947	Writer with Milt Schaffer	Woody Woodpecker	Final short co-written with Milt Schaffer, who had returned to Disney in 1946.
Woody the Giant Killer	1947	Writer with Webb Smith	Woody Woodpecker	First short co-written with Webb Smith.
The Bandmaster	1947	Writer with Webb Smith	Andy Panda	Similar to the Musical Miniatures which ran concurrently.
The Mad Hatter	1948	Writer with Webb Smith	Woody Woodpecker	Final short co-written by Webb Smith.
Banquet Busters	1948	Writer with Jack Cosgriff	Woody Woodpecker	First short co-written with Jack Cosgriff, during his second stint at the studio.
Kiddie Koncert	1948	Writer with Jack Cosgriff	Musical Miniatures	
Wacky-Bye Baby	1948	Writer with Jack Cosgriff	Woody Woodpecker	
Pixie Picnic	1948	Writer with Jack Cosgriff	Musical Miniatures	Final Musical Miniature short.
Wet Blanket Policy	1948	Writer with Heck Allen	Woody Woodpecker	First short co-written with Heck Allen.
Playful Pelican	1948	Writer with Jack Cosgriff	Andy Panda	Final short co-written with Jack Cosgriff.
Dog Tax Dodgers	1948	Writer with Heck Allen	Andy Panda	
Wild and Woody!	1948	Writer with Heck Allen	Woody Woodpecker	
Scrappy Birthday	1949	Writer with Heck Allen	Andy Panda	Final Andy Panda cartoon.
Drooler's Delight	1949	Writer with Heck Allen	Woody Woodpecker	Final short where Hardaway voices Woody. Final short completed before the 1948 shutdown.
Puny Express	1951	Writer with Heck Allen	Woody Woodpecker	Storyboarded by Hardaway and Allen prior to the studio shut down, and were subsequently shelved. Once the studio re-opened in 1950, these two shorts were placed back into production and included in a new order by Universal for 7 shorts in the 1951–1952 season. Hardaway did not return to the studio once it reopened. Final Walter Lantz shorts Hardaway worked on and final Woody Woodpecker shorts to have any involvement from Hardaway and final shorts co-written with Heck Allen.
Sleep Happy	1951	Writer with Heck Allen	Woody Woodpecker	Storyboarded by Hardaway and Allen prior to the studio shut down, and were subsequently shelved. Once the studio re-opened in 1950, these two shorts were placed back into production and included in a new order by Universal for 7 shorts in the 1951–1952 season. Hardaway did not return to the studio once it reopened. Final Walter Lantz shorts Hardaway worked on and final Woody Woodpecker shorts to have any involvement from Hardaway and final shorts co-written with Heck Allen.

=== Warner Bros. Cartoons ===
Title	Release Date	Role	Series	Notes
A Bone for a Bone	1951	Writer	Looney Tunes	Final Looney Tune to be worked on by Hardaway. Final Warner Bros. cartoon and final theatrical cartoon in general to be written by Hardaway. Would have begun production around 1949. Features the Goofy Gophers.

=== Television ===
- Adventures of Pow Wow (1956) - Writer
