= Buddy the Woodsman =

1934 film by Jack King

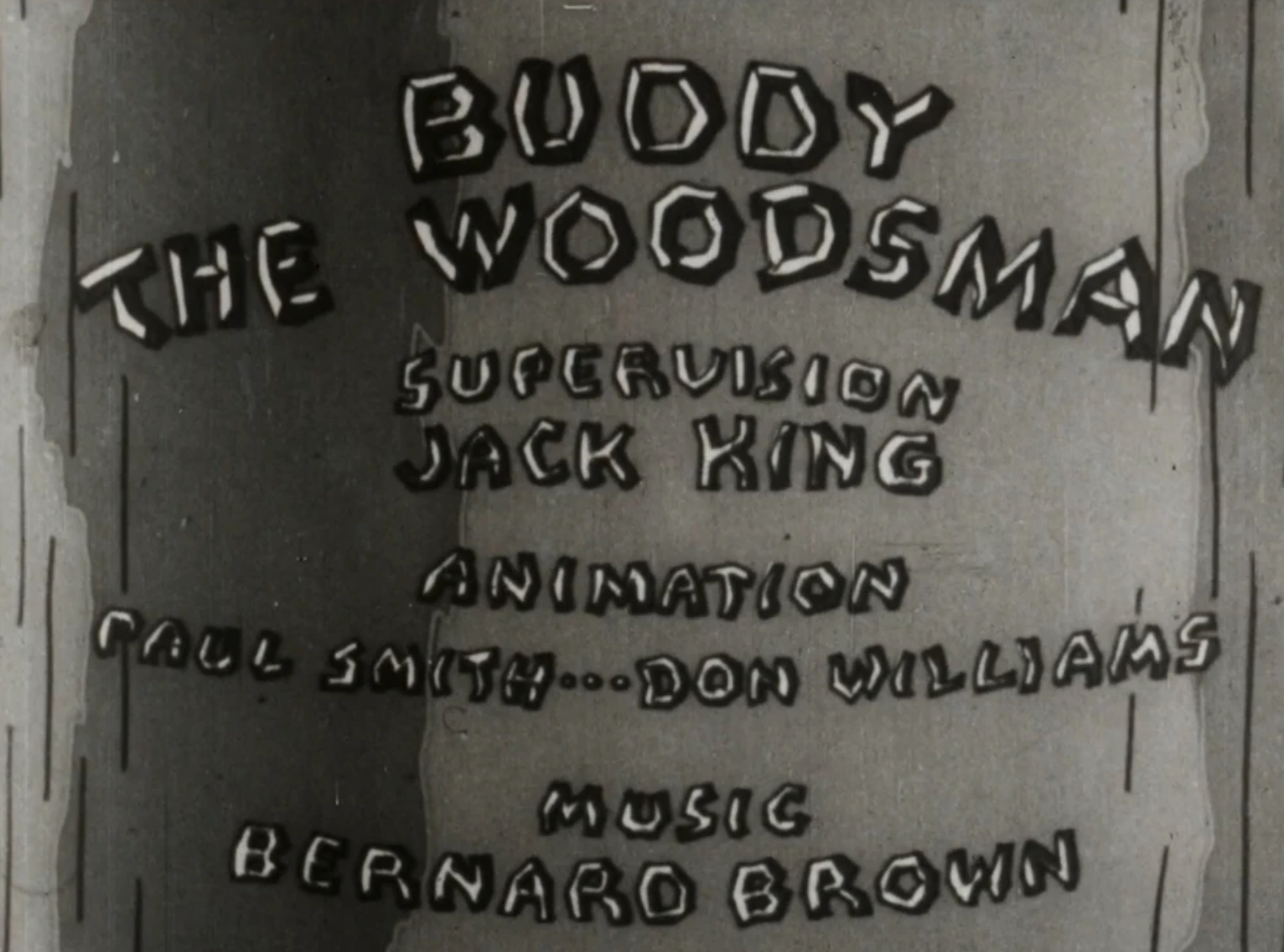
- Title card
- Directed by: Jack King
- Produced by: Leon Schlesinger
- Starring: Billy Bletcher; Bernard Brown
- Music by: Bernard Brown
- Animation by: Paul Smith; Don Williams
- Color process: Black-and-white
- Production company: Leon Schlesinger Productions
- Distributed by: Warner Bros. Productions; The Vitaphone Corporation
- Release date: October 27, 1934
- Running time: 6 minutes
- Country: United States
- Language: English

Buddy the Woodsman is a 1934 American animated comedy short film directed by Jack King. The short was released on October 27, 1934. It is the 49th film in the Looney Tunes series and the eleventh cartoon to feature Buddy.

== Plot ==
Numerous eccentric lumberjacks cut trees in a forest in their respective ways, somehow also felling a guard tower in the process. Buddy tries to cut a tree, the tremors from which terrify baby birds in a nest on top of the tree; their parents immediately move the nest upon noticing. Buddy finishes chopping the tree and goes on another log to remove its bark and convert it into toothpicks. Buddy uses a saw to jump on another tree and uses a smaller saw as a jumprope to hack the tree into smaller pieces. He then goads a goat to chase him and carve numerous trees in the process.

While two lumberjacks attempt to chop a totem pole, Buddy trips and drops his logs, only to be surprised that they form a complete xylophone. He plays it and the totem pole comes to life. It is supper time, during which Buddy and Cookie sing and dance with the other lumberjacks. Cookie serves spaghetti cooked by a stereotypical Chinese cook. A bear on a tree smells the food and enters, knocking over the cook, who hides in a cupboard while his detached queue hides in a floor hole. The bear licks leftover sauce and jumps on the table, leading to the lumberjacks hiding under the floor. The bear treats Buddy and Cookie in an amicable manner until the former sends it flying into a stove and jamming its nose in a stovepipe. Angered, it launches Buddy into cutlery and chases him while hitting his buttocks. Cookie shoots it with a shotgun, causing it to chase her instead, so Buddy uses the piano chair to send the bear flying outside the cabin. The bear escapes while Buddy and Cookie celebrate.
