= A Bone for a Bone =

1951 film by Friz Freleng

- Title card
- Directed by: I. Freleng
- Story by: J.B. Hardaway
- Starring: Mel Blanc
- Music by: Carl Stalling
- Animation by: Virgil Ross; Arthur Davis; Manuel Perez; Ken Champin
- Layouts by: Hawley Pratt
- Backgrounds by: Paul Julian
- Color process: Technicolor
- Production company: Warner Bros. Cartoons
- Distributed by: Warner Bros. Pictures; The Vitaphone Corporation
- Release date: April 7, 1951 (US)
- Running time: 7 minutes
- Language: English

A Bone for a Bone is a 1951 Warner Bros. Looney Tunes short directed by Friz Freleng. It was released on April 7, 1951, and features the Goofy Gophers.

The cartoon is the first of four Goofy Gophers cartoon directed by Freleng, and would be the final work by J.B. Hardaway at the Warner Bros. Cartoons studio, having returned after almost a decade at rival studio Walter Lantz Productions.

== Plot ==
The Gophers are playing a gin game in their hole in the ground outside a house, where Tosh loses his fifth game in a row, when Geo P. Dog digs a hole and dumps a bone on the Gophers and then dirt as he fills the hole in. Geo does remove the bone upon Tosh's request but then, resenting Tosh for presuming to make such a request, he returns to the same hole to rebury the bone. This time, Mac goes up, only to be grabbed by Geo. Mac then yells for help, which arrives in the form of Tosh and a hammer, which Tosh uses to knock Geo's head into his collar, allowing the Gophers to return to their hole and escape the dog, but not before the Gophers have an argument over who should enter the hole first.

As Geo then reaches into the hole to try to find the Gophers, the Gophers attach a fake hand to one end of a gray garden hose and a noose around the other end to fasten to the dog's actual hand. The hose is then brought out of another hole and extended out to the street, where it is quickly run over by a truck, leading the dog to believe he has been hurt until he finds Tosh behind him. After blocking two attempts by Tosh to get back into his hole, the dog challenges Tosh to come up with a trick, which he does: a card with firecracker that explodes, allowing Tosh to escape.

Furious, Geo then gets a can of TNT and pours it down the Gophers' hole. Mac then emerges from the other one and asks to borrow a match, to which Geo obliges, only to see the match used to light the pouring TNT and ignite it. Finally, Geo chases the Gophers underground, and is tricked into believing they went into an open gas main. Soon after Geo enters the main, the Gophers close it making it pitch black. As the dog attempts to light a match, the gas main explodes, and the dog pops out of the oven in the house and eventually departs the premises (it is here that the dog is identified). The Gophers then resume their gin game.

== Home media ==
This short is available on the Looney Tunes Collector's Choice: Volume 4 Blu-ray.
