= Buddy's Lost World =

1935 film by Jack King

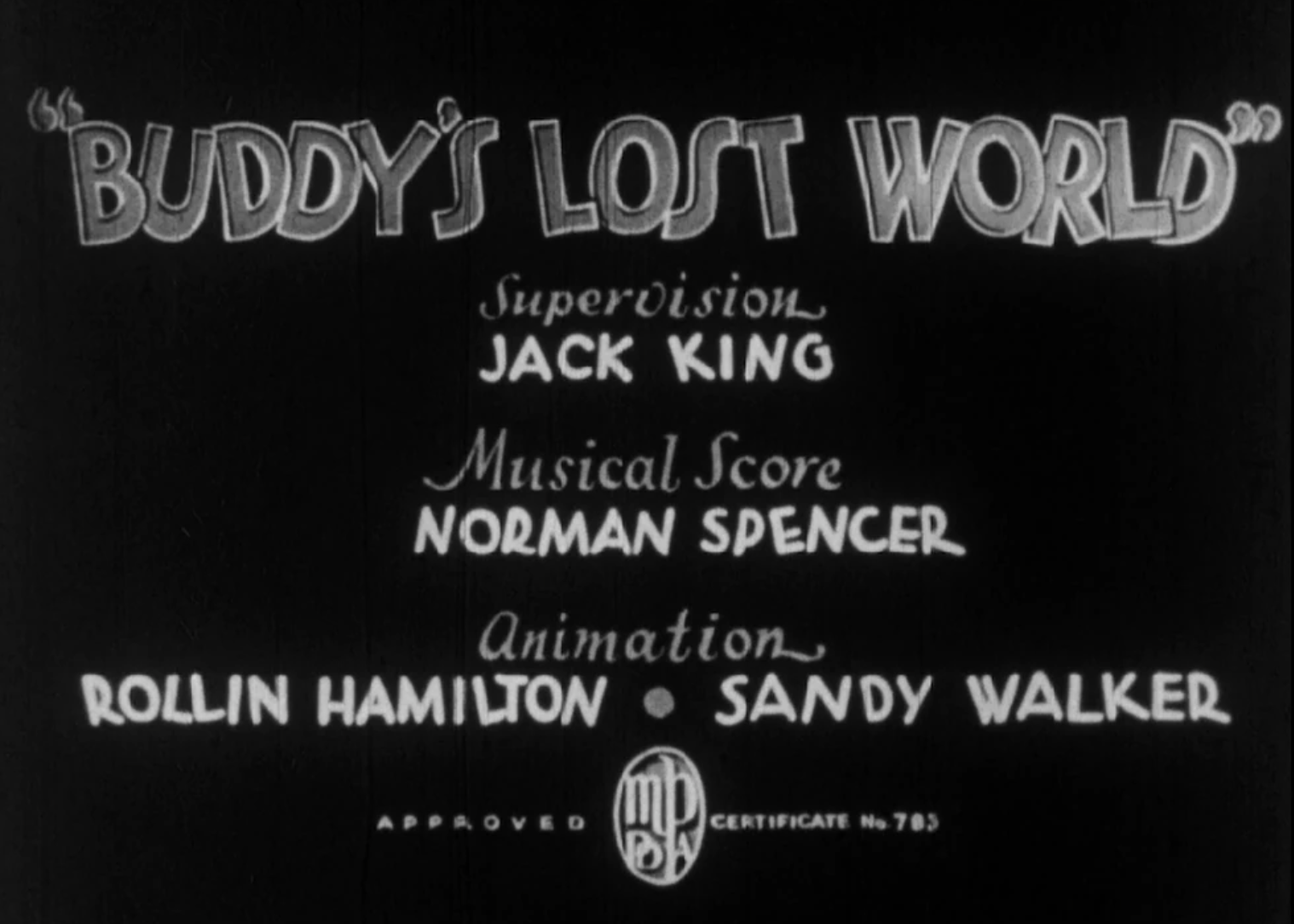
- Title card
- Directed by: Jack King
- Produced by: Leon Schlesinger
- Starring: Billy Bletcher; Tommy Bond
- Music by: Norman Spencer
- Animation by: Rollin Hamilton; Sandy Walker
- Color process: Black-and-white
- Production company: Leon Schlesinger Productions
- Distributed by: Warner Bros. Productions; The Vitaphone Corporation
- Release date: May 18, 1935
- Running time: 7 minutes
- Country: United States
- Language: English

Buddy's Lost World is a 1935 American animated comedy short film directed by Jack King. The short was released on May 18, 1935. It is the 56th film in the Looney Tunes series and the nineteenth cartoon to feature Buddy.

== Plot ==
Buddy embarks on a seaborne journey to the lost world. As a crowd bids Buddy goodbye, the dock they are on is pulled apart as he had neglected to remove his rope tied to the dock, leaving the people floating in the water. After some time, they manage to land on the lost world, to Buddy's excitement.

Bozo finds a pair of footprints that move away from him every time he snips them. The footprints lead him to what seems to be a dense forest, but is actually a Barapasaurus. Frightened, he runs over a cavewoman who plays jumprope, but halts just in time to avoid a caveman who acts like a dog. As the caveman crawls away with a large bone, Bozo finds what seems to be a small bone, but turns out to be a fossil of a giant dinosaur which locks him inside. Buddy spots him and saves him by lifting the fossil's teeth.

Buddy then spots the caveman from earlier, leading Bozo to chase him into a tree. Buddy is shut out, leading him to call for Bozo until he is eaten by a giant flower. Buddy is stunned to discover that a civilization of cavemen live in the flower. He rides a Barapasaurus down and tames it with an apple. Three cavemen resembling The Three Stooges who repeatedly abuse each other, including the caveman from earlier, spot Buddy and plot to trap him using Bozo as bait. Buddy falls for the trap easily and is led to a pot where he and Bozo is cooked, while a celebration involving a fight between two cavemen occurs. Buddy calls for help and the Barapasaurus appears to save them by flinging the cavemen away. Bozo and the Barapasaurus affectionately lick Buddy.
