= Buddy in Africa =

1935 film by Ben Hardaway

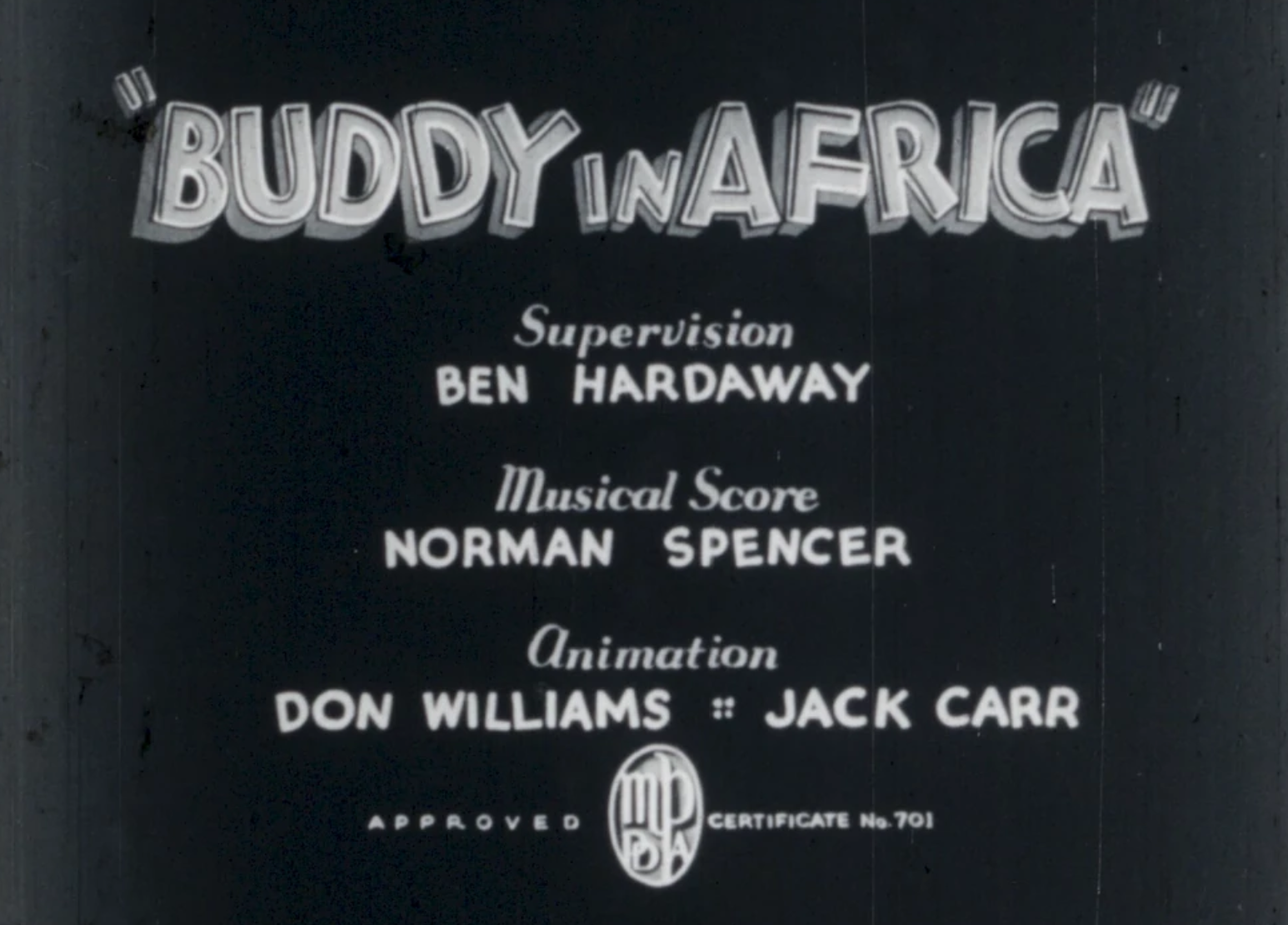
- Title card
- Directed by: Ben Hardaway
- Produced by: Leon Schlesinger
- Starring: Jackie Morrow; The Four Blackbirds
- Music by: Norman Spencer
- Animation by: Don Williams; Jack Carr
- Color process: Black-and-white
- Production company: Leon Schlesinger Productions
- Distributed by: Warner Bros. Productions; The Vitaphone Corporation
- Release date: July 6, 1935
- Running time: 6 minutes
- Country: United States
- Language: English

Buddy in Africa is an American animated comedy short film directed by Ben Hardaway. It was released on July 6, 1935. It is the 58th film in the Looney Tunes series and the 21st cartoon to feature Buddy.

== Plot ==
A stereotypical African villager mows the grass forming the roof of his hut, another crushes a fruit using his companion's mouth, while another throws children into targets with their nose rings as though they were horseshoes. Buddy operates a variety store in his truck, driving towards the village Snake-Eyes while ignoring a hitchhiking gorilla. Buddy sells musical instruments, frying pans, and Roman candles to the villagers in exchange for native fruits.

A villager uses a storage battery to light up lightbulbs he had connected to his ears, then wears a bucket to serve as adequate lighting for reading. Another lights Roman candles in his mouth and predictably is thrown out by the sheer force. Buddy sells jungle bitters to the villagers, the consumption of which compels the natives to perform a musical number and dance in numerous ways.

A naughty monkey takes a bottle, but is spanked by Buddy. He escapes and encounters the hitchhiking gorilla from before, requesting retaliation. The gorilla punches a villager into the ground. The gorilla approaches Buddy as he inflates a tire and a violent confrontation occurs. Buddy is chased to a guard tower, where the gorilla is flung away by the tire's pressure into a palm tree, then is thrown back and destroys the tower. Buddy and the gorilla make amends after the gorilla launches the monkey the same way.
