= Viva Buddy =

1934 film by Jack King

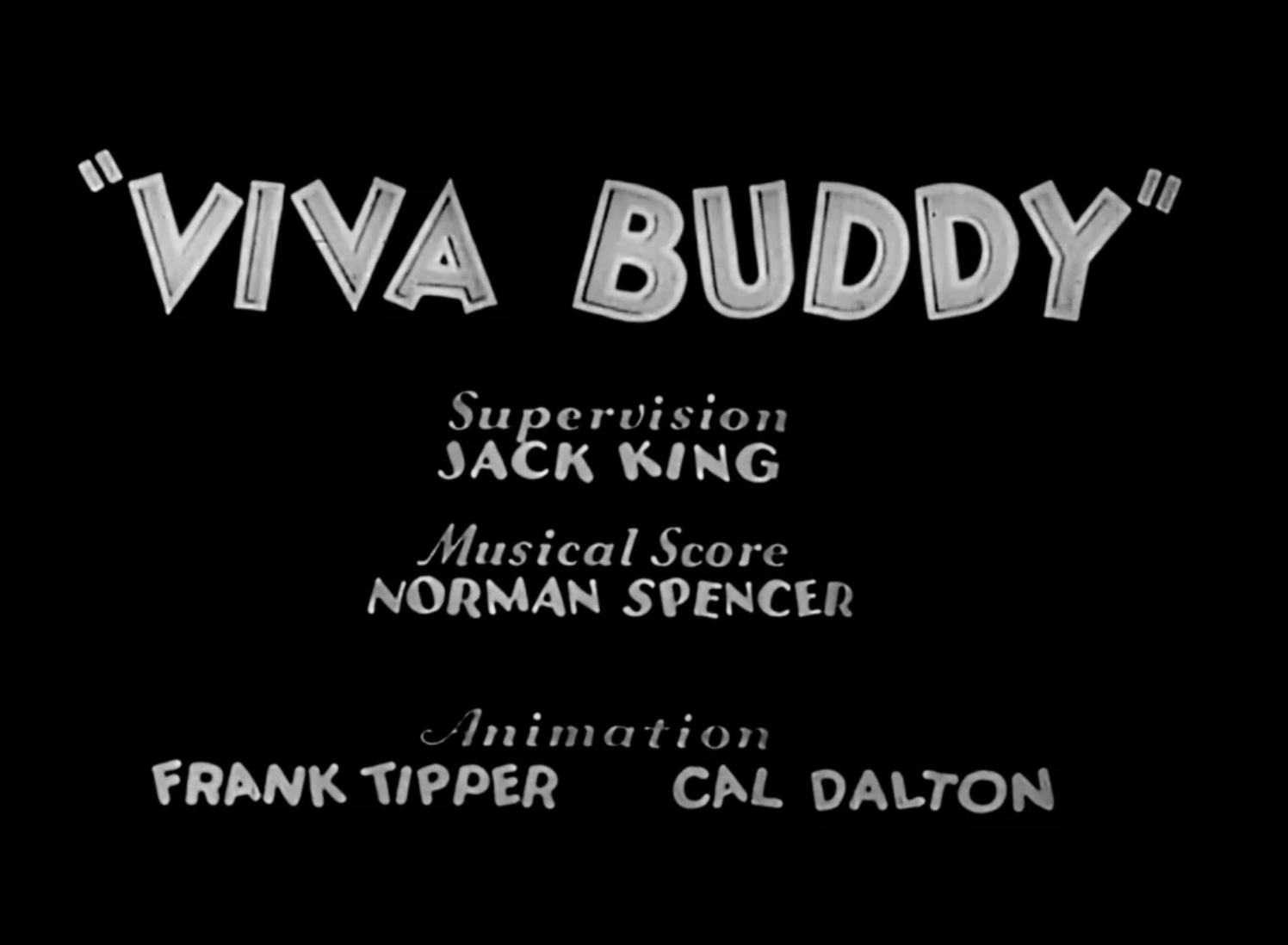
- Title card
- Directed by: Jack King
- Produced by: Leon Schlesinger
- Starring: Billy Bletcher
- Music by: Norman Spencer
- Animation by: Frank Tipper; Cal Dalton
- Color process: Black-and-white
- Production company: Leon Schlesinger Productions
- Distributed by: Warner Bros. Productions; The Vitaphone Corporation
- Release date: December 12, 1934
- Running time: 6 minutes
- Country: United States
- Language: English

Viva Buddy is a 1934 American animated comedy short film directed by Jack King. The short was released on December 12, 1934. It is the 52nd film in the Looney Tunes series, the fourteenth cartoon to feature Buddy, as well as the first film to credit Cal Dalton, who would help create Bugs Bunny at the studio.

== Summary ==
Buddy walks through a Mexican town while playing his guitar. He walks into a balcony and falls on hats worn by a hat salesman. He attempts to enter the saloon Cantina El Moocher, but is blown away by the patrons' snores, instead entering through an open window. Every patron is sleep, even at a checkers table, where jumping beans play for them. Buddy slips one of the beans into the mouth of a man at the bar's piano, and he begins to play with his toes. The patrons wake up and sing and dance, while Buddy plays his guitar in humorous manner.

An outlaw and caricature of Wallace Beery, Pancho, and his subordinates arrive to terrorize the townsfolk by shooting a myriad of objects. After tying his horse's tail to a hole in a stake he formed by shooting it, the outlaw steps into the saloon and starts firing. The patrons yell his name and hide, while the four Marx brothers make an appearance and shout: "Zeppo!" "Harpo!" "Chico!" "Groucho!". Pancho shoots Buddy's banana, angering Buddy and causing him to squeeze a whole banana at Pancho's face. Pancho holds Buddy at gunpoint but changes his mind and makes him play the piano. Cookie appears and begins to dance to Buddy's tune. Pancho tries to impress Cookie by skating to the beat to no avail. He requests a kiss, only to be knocked through the door and knocked inside again by a goat. Buddy fires a fork and candelabra, which respectively hit Pancho's buttocks and jam his guns. Pancho then uses a whip to trap Buddy and stuff him into his hat, only for Buddy to punch him after being set free. Pancho swings him while he reaches for the ceiling lights, causing them to swing and hit a cupboard. They resolve their differences and laugh together.
