= Buddy's Bug Hunt =

1935 film by Jack King

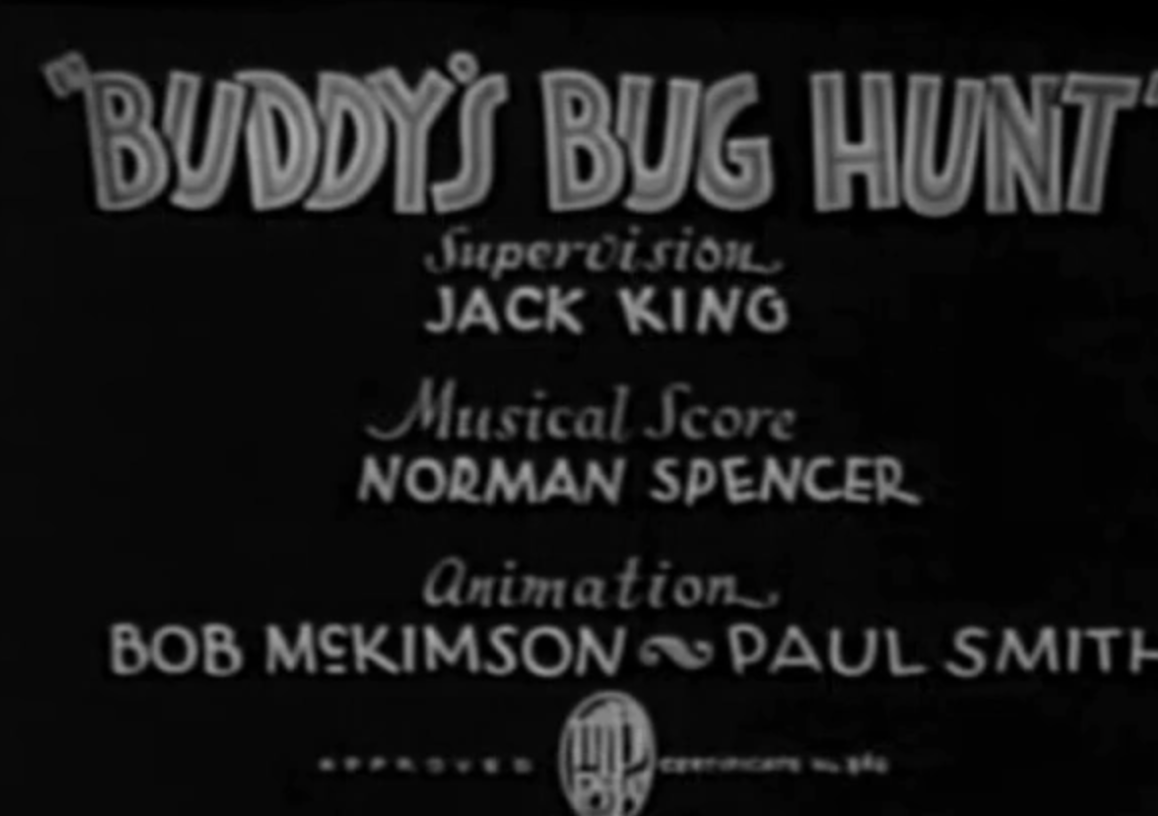
- Title card
- Directed by: Jack King
- Produced by: Leon Schlesinger
- Starring: Jackie Morrow; Bernice Hansen; Billy Bletcher
- Music by: Norman Spencer
- Animation by: Bob McKimson; Paul Smith
- Color process: Black-and-white
- Production company: Leon Schlesinger Productions
- Distributed by: Warner Bros. Productions; The Vitaphone Corporation
- Release date: June 22, 1935
- Running time: 7 minutes
- Country: United States
- Language: English

Buddy's Bug Hunt is a 1935 American animated comedy short film directed by Jack King. It was released on June 22, 1935. It is the 57th film in the Looney Tunes series and the twentieth cartoon to feature Buddy.

== Plot ==
Buddy chases after a butterfly with his net, confusing a woman's bow with the butterfly before chasing it into his own "Bug House", where he finds it hiding in a flower. As he traps butterflies in tanks, he then removes spider from its web and etherizes it upon a table so that he might examine it with his microscope. As the spider cries, Buddy dispenses more ether, but falls unconscious to the spider's relief and amusement.

The spider rescues its peers, a frog and other insects, trapping Buddy within its webs. The spider and frog force feed Buddy pills that shrinks him to the size of an insect. A musical number ensues where the insects mock Buddy and accuse him of numerous acts. They decide to organize a trial for Buddy at a radio which he had designated as a "supreme court" of insects. The witnesses included a grasshopper which Buddy had amputated for fun, a female butterfly resembling Cookie who was orphaned and a widowed Mae West-like bug whose husband was killed by Buddy. Buddy was then sentenced to death by burning. It turns out that the entire ordeal was a hallucination by Buddy, whose buttocks are burnt by sunlight passing through the microscope. He sets every insect and frog free and shuts down his "Bug House", which then collapses on him while two frogs play on a spare plank like a see-saw.
