= Dog Daze (1937 film) =

1937 film by Isadore Freleng

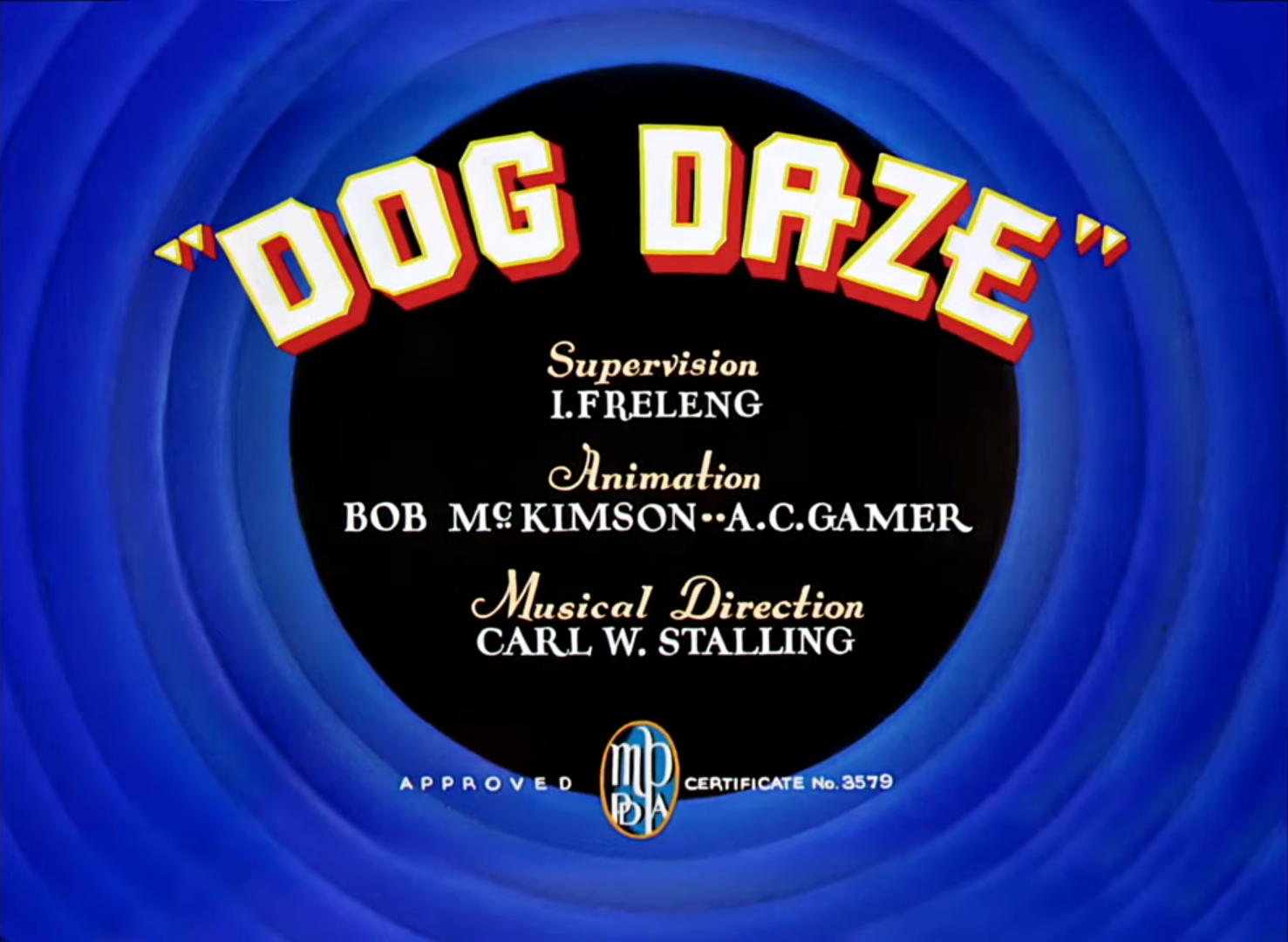
- Title card
- Directed by: Isadore Freleng
- Produced by: Leon Schlesinger
- Starring: Mel Blanc
- Music by: Carl W. Stalling
- Animation by: Bob McKimson; A.C. Gamer
- Color process: Technicolor
- Production company: Leon Schlesinger Productions
- Distributed by: Warner Bros. Productions; The Vitaphone Corporation
- Release date: September 18, 1937
- Running time: 7 min
- Country: United States
- Language: English

Dog Daze is a 1937 American animated comedy short film directed by Isadore Freleng. The short was released on September 18, 1937. It is the 82nd film in the Merrie Melodies series.

== Plot ==
A bunch of dogs and their owners are all heading to the dog show, including some dogs who resemble their owners. A large woman attempts to reach her seat and pushes down fellow audience members. In the preparation room, a bird dog literally chirps like a bird, an Irish Setter hatching eggs with its offspring inside, a police dog howling, the spitz literally spitting tobacco, a drunk St. Bernard and a hot dog.

At the stage, the spotlight shines on advertisements for dog-related services. The first performance involves two Scottish Terriers dancing a Scottish dance. Two comically thin Russian Wolfhounds then dance to a Russian song and leave with two black puppies who are disguised as their hats. In the following "performances", a dog eats the hot dog from earlier while a tired dog is showcased for a few seconds.

Prairie dogs sing and dance while the St. Bernard howls nearby, so he is silenced with a muzzle. An attempt to remove it leads to it tripping into a chest of skating items, causing it to cross the stage in roller skates and crash onto a wall. The final performance involves a shy puppy who clumsily recites "Mary Had a Little Lamb", only to be attacked by fleas from a flea circus accidentally unleashed by the St. Bernard, as it speeds up and hurriedly leaves. The St. Bernard finds the fleas drinking his alcohol, as they sing drunkenly and pass out.
