= Saps in Chaps =

1942 film by Isadore Freleng

- Title card
- Directed by: I. Freleng
- Story by: Dave Monahan
- Produced by: Leon Schlesinger
- Starring: Mel Blanc
- Music by: Carl W. Stalling
- Animation by: Manuel Perez
- Color process: Black and white
- Production company: Leon Schlesinger Productions
- Distributed by: Warner Bros. Pictures
- Release date: April 11, 1942
- Running time: 6 min
- Country: United States
- Language: English

Saps in Chaps is a 1942 American animated comedy short film directed by Isadore Freleng. The short was released on April 11, 1942. It is part of the Looney Tunes series and the final black-and-white cartoon to be directed by Freleng.

== Plot ==
Full short

The film is a series of unrelated gags involving the Wild West.

The narrator heads west, showcasing visual gags, such as Mount Rushmore with the sculptures depicted as children and a painted desert. A famished traveler drinks water supplied by "Buster's Last Stand" before continuing to crawl.

Settlers move in and towns popp up, with even the cats learning from cowboys to hunt a mouse with a lasso. A cowboy fails to mount his horse throughout the film as a running gag. A villain fails to kill a cowboy despite shooting him multiple times and hitting. A rodeo occurs where a horse jumps high in almost perfect form while another horse throws off its rider. A third horse is too crowd shy to perform. A Native American manchild rides his mother. The cowboy who fails to mount his horse is rode by his horse instead.
