= Cal Dalton =

American animator and director (1908–1974)

Calvin Moore Dalton (December 2, 1908 – June 9, 1974) was an American animator and director best known for his work at Warner Bros. Cartoons.

== Work ==
Dalton's first commercial animation work was in 1930 for Romer Grey and Boyd La Vero, serving as a lead animator on the latter's series. He later worked on an animated short version of The Wizard of Oz that was produced by Ted Eshbaugh's independent animation studio in 1933. Afterwards, Dalton left to work at Leon Schlesinger Productions, with his first project being 1934's Viva Buddy. All together, Dalton worked on 33 Warner Bros. cartoons as part of their animation department. In 1937, he animated on the Bob Clampett directed segment for When's Your Birthday?.

In 1938, following Friz Freleng's departure, Frank Tashlin was promoted to take over Freleng's unit, while Dalton was promoted to director to take over Tashlin's old unit; for unknown reasons, he was never allowed to be sole director, and shared his duties initially with Cal Howard, and then Ben Hardaway. Dalton later admitted feeling aggrieved about the fact that while he was meant to be nominally in charge of Freleng's former unit, he tended to be overshadowed by the presence of the more experienced Hardaway.

Dalton's major contribution to the legacy of Warner Bros. animation was having co-directed Hare-um Scare-um in 1939 with Hardaway. The short featured a gray and white rabbit that served as the prototype for Bugs Bunny. Dalton directed or co-directed a total of 17 Warner Bros. cartoons from 1938 through 1940. He spent the rest of his years at Warner Bros. doing strictly animation work before leaving the studio in 1947. Dalton's last project was Goofy Gophers (1947), which was the first cartoon to feature those characters. He also did some uncredited animation in the Daffy Duck cartoon called Mexican Joyride (1947).
