= Norman Spencer (composer) =

American musician, composer and songwriter

Norman Spencer Matthews (March 3, 1891– February 15, 1940), was an American musician and songwriter. He is best known for having served as musical director/composer for Warner Brothers' /Leon Schlesinger's Looney Tunes and Merrie Melodies cartoon shorts from 1933 to 1936.

== Career ==
Spencer was born in Minneapolis. By 1911 he was living in California and working as a pianist. Beginning in 1919 he was credited as a songwriter for many songs as well as writing scores for musical stage shows.

Spencer served as composer and director of music for Leon Schlesinger Productions from 1933 to 1936, along with fellow composer Bernard Brown, creating film scores for animated short films in the Looney Tunes and Merrie Melodies series produced by Leon Schlesinger. His son Norman, Jr. reportedly handled the musical arrangements for both series.

According to an article for The Film Daily published on April 29, 1936, Spencer had just completed a three-year contract for the studio and signed a new three-year contract. However, an article published on August 3 of the same year reported that Spencer had resigned and that Carl Stalling was succeeding him as the studio's music director. According to the article, Schlesinger had already signed a new contract with Spencer, only to hire his replacement a few months later, following Brown's departure to head the sound department for Universal Studios. The reasons for Spencer's resignation are unknown.

According to a story told by voice actor Mel Blanc during a 1988 interview, Spencer was also the person responsible for hiring voice actors for the studio. Blanc repeatedly requested an audition from the Schlesinger studio, but Spencer kept telling him that the studio had no need for new voice actors. One day in 1936, Blanc returned with another request for an audition and found Spencer missing, as he had fallen ill and Treg Brown (who later replaced Spencer as sound editor) was filling in. At this point, Brown finally gave Blanc his long-awaited audition, and subsequently hired him.

== Filmography ==
Clifford McCarty lists the following credits for Norman Spencer:

- Buddy's Day Out (1933)
- I've Got to Sing a Torch Song (1933)
- Beauty and the Beast (1934)
- Buddy and Towser (1934)
- Buddy of the Apes (1934)
- Buddy the Detective (1934)
- Buddy the Gob (1934)
- Buddy the Woodsman (1934)
- Buddy's Bearcats (1934)
- Buddy's Beer Garden (1934)
- Buddy's Circus (1934)
- Buddy's Garage (1934)
- Buddy's Show Boat (1934)
- Buddy's Trolley Troubles (1934)
- The Girl at the Ironing Board (1934)
- Goin' to Heaven on a Mule (1934)
- Honeymoon Hotel (1934)
- The Miller's Daughter (1934)
- Pettin' in the Park (1934)
- Shake Your Powder Puff (1934)
- Sittin' on a Backyard Fence (1933)
- Those Were Wonderful Days (1934)
- Viva Buddy (1934)
- Why Do I Dream Those Dreams (1934)
- Along Flirtation Walk (1935)
- Buddy in Africa (1935)
- Buddy of the Legion (1935)
- Buddy Steps Out (1935)
- Buddy the Dentist (1934)
- Buddy the Gee Man (1935)
- Buddy's Adventures (1934)
- Buddy's Bug Hunt (1935)
- Buddy's Pony Express (1935)
- Buddy's Theatre (1935)
- The Country Boy (1935)
- The Country Mouse (1935)
- I Haven't Got a Hat (1935)
- Into Your Dance (1935)
- The Merry Old Soul (1935)
- Mr. and Mrs. Is the Name (1935)
- My Green Fedora (1935)
- Pop Goes Your Heart (1934)
- Rhythm in the Bow (1934)
- Those Beautiful Dames (1934)
- Alpine Antics (1936)
- At Your Service Madame (1936)
- Billboard Frolics (1935)
- Bingo Crosbyana (1936)
- The Blow Out (1936)
- Boom Boom (1936)
- Buddy's Lost World (1935)
- A Cartoonist's Nightmare (1936)
- The Cat Came Back (1936)
- The Fire Alarm (1936)
- Fish Tales (1936)
- Flowers for Madame (1935)
- Gold Diggers of '49 (1935)
- Hollywood Capers (1935)
- I Love to Singa (1936)
- I Wanna Play House (1936)
- I'd Love to Take Orders From You (1936)
- I'm a Big Shot Now (1936)
- The Lady in Red (1936)
- Let It Be Me (1936)
- The Little Dutch Plate (1935)
- Page Miss Glory (1936)
- The Phantom Ship (1936)
- Plane Dippy (1936)
- Porky the Rain-Maker (1936)
- Porky's Pet (1936)
- Shanghaied Shipmates (1936)
- Sunday Go to Meetin' Time (1936)
- Westward Whoa (1936)
- When I Yoo Hoo (1936)

== Sources ==
- McCarty, Clifford (2000). "Screen credits". Film Composers in America: A Filmography, 1911-1970. Oxford University Press. ISBN 978-0195114737.
- McCarty, Clifford (2000). "Methodology". Film Composers in America: A Filmography, 1911-1970. Oxford University Press. ISBN 978-0195114737.
- McCarty, Clifford (2000). "Spencer, Norman". Film Composers in America: A Filmography, 1911-1970. Oxford University Press. ISBN 978-0195114737.
- Sigall, Martha (2005). "The Boys of Termite Terrace". Living Life Inside the Lines: Tales from the Golden Age of Animation. University Press of Mississippi. ISBN 9781578067497.
