= Beauty and the Beast (1934 film) =

1934 film by Isadore Freleng

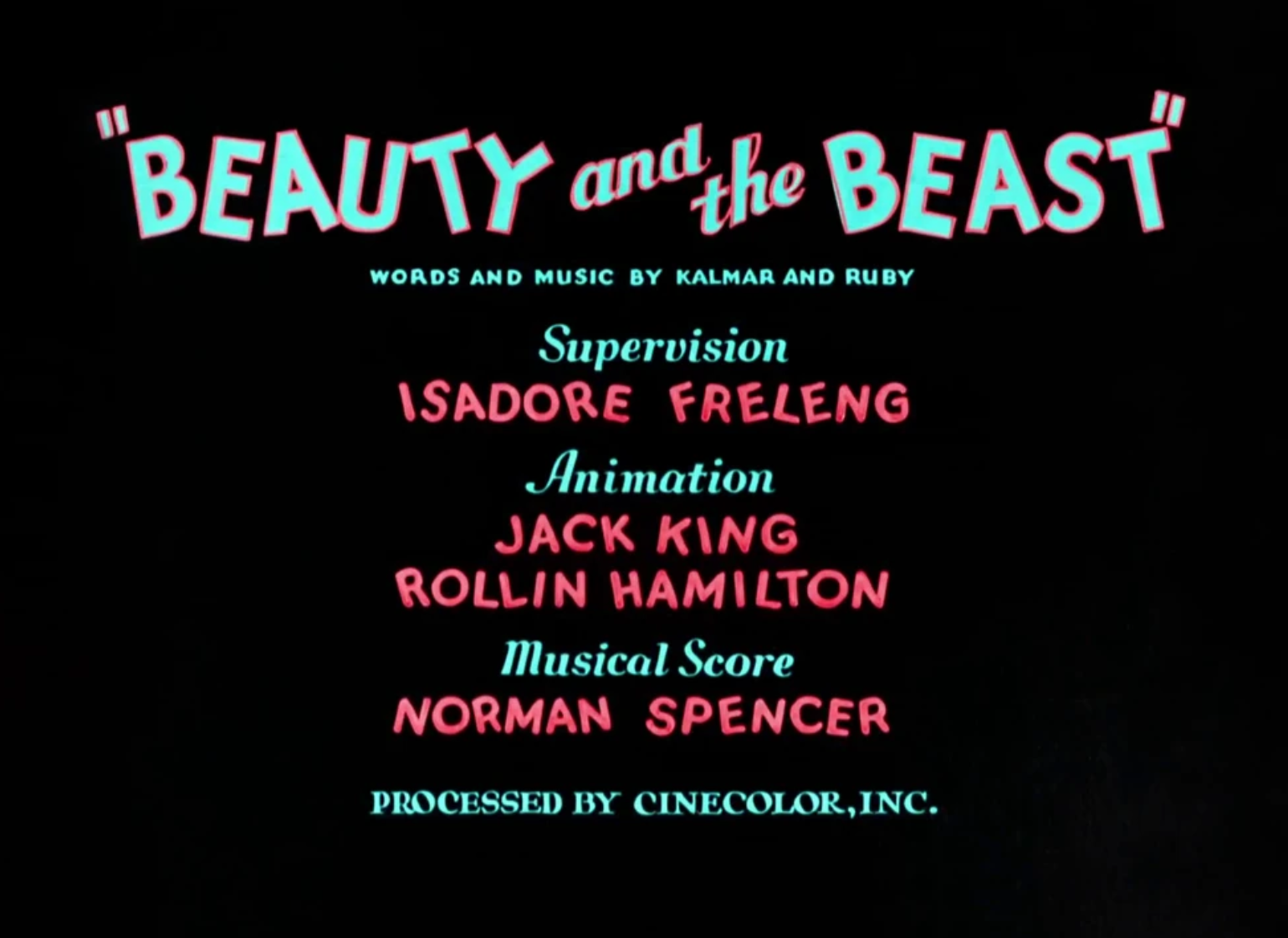
- Title card
- Directed by: Isadore Freleng
- Produced by: Leon Schlesinger
- Starring: Bernice Hansen; Billy Bletcher
- Music by: Norman Spencer
- Animation by: Jack King; Rollin Hamilton
- Color process: Cinecolor
- Production company: Leon Schlesinger Productions
- Distributed by: Warner Bros. Pictures; The Vitaphone Corporation
- Release date: April 14, 1934
- Running time: 7 minutes
- Country: United States
- Language: English

Beauty and the Beast is a 1934 American animated comedy short film directed by Isadore Freleng. The short was released on April 14, 1934. It is the 32nd film in the Merrie Melodies series, featuring the titular song by Bert Kalmar and Harry Ruby, the second to be released in color via Cinecolor, as well as the first color cartoon to be directed by Freleng.

== Plot ==
One night, a young girl sneaks out of her nursery for a late night snack of fruit and chocolate, which may be the cause of the strange dream that follows. On her return to the nursery, the Sandman comes to life from the nursery mural, and sends her in a dream to Toyland, inhabited by fairyland characters. A trio of identical heralds sing her a welcome song, but also warn her of the Beast she must avoid, lest he eat her.

The girl witnesses a toy parade and is smitten with a toy soldier ("Ain't he cute?"). The soldier takes her to Fairytale Land, where they open a huge book titled "Beauty and the Beast" and, reading the text, sing a song about a girl menaced by a monster. When they turn the page, the huge, shaggy, half-human Beast leaps out of the book and seizes the girl. The toy soldier sends a toy airplane to attack the Beast, and tries to fire a cannon at him, but these tactics prove ineffective.

And just as it appears that the girl is doomed, she awakens on the floor of her nursery, and when she realizes that it was all a nightmare, she leaps into her crib and cowers under the covers as the flap of her pajamas falls open, revealing her bare buttocks.

== Production ==
By early 1934, Friz Freleng was appointed the main director of the Merrie Melodies, following the departures of other directors from Leon Schlesinger Productions (the company later known as Warner Bros. Cartoons). Beauty and the Beast (released in April 1934) was the first Merrie Melodies animated short film directed by Freleng. It was a color film, using the two-color Cinecolor process. However, following its release, Freleng would direct six Merrie Melodies shorts in black-and-white. Among them were The Girl at the Ironing Board and The Miller's Daughter. From November 1934 onwards, the Merrie Melodies switched to only including color films. The sibling series Looney Tunes continued to be produced in black-and-white until 1943.

Animation historian Michael Barrier reports that other than the use of color, there is little to set Beauty and the Beast apart from a typical Merrie Melodies film, as directed by Rudolf Ising. Freleng as a director was extending and revising formulas established by Ising. Part of the strong resemblance was unsurprising. Freleng himself had drawn the character layouts for most of Ising's Merrie Melodies. But there were also other similarities; down to the details. For example, the little girl of the film exclaims "Ain't he cute?". A very similar phrase, "Ain't that cute?", was used as Bosko's catchphrase in multiple Harman-Ising Looney Tunes films.

The plot of the film follows a formula that had been previously used in Ising's Merrie Melodies and in early Silly Symphonies. The films of this type opened with characters dancing and singing, then these activities were interrupted by the actions of a villain. The defeat of the villain required the combined efforts of the dancers and singers. Freleng would follow this formula in several of his subsequent Merrie Melodies.

== Home media ==
This short is available on disc 1 of the Looney Tunes Collector's Vault: Volume 1 Blu-ray set.

== Sources ==
- Barrier, Michael (2003), "Warner Bros., 1933-1940", Hollywood Cartoons: American Animation in Its Golden Age, Oxford University Press, ISBN 978-0199839223
