= Towser (disambiguation) =

Towser is a series of children's books created by Tony Ross.

Towser may also refer to:

== Media ==
- Sic 'Em Towser, 1918 film
- Buddy and Towser, 1934 film
- Sergeant Towser, a character in the novel Catch-22
- Old Towser, a minor character in One Hundred and One Dalmatians

== Other uses ==
- Towser Gosden (1904–1967), British racehorse trainer
- Towser the mouser, a cat used to cat mice at Glenturret distillery
