= The Cat Came Back (1936 film) =

1936 film by Isadore Freleng

- Directed by: Isadore Freleng
- Produced by: Leon Schlesinger
- Music by: Norman Spencer
- Animation by: Bob McKimson; Ben Clopton
- Color process: Technicolor
- Production company: Leon Schlesinger Productions
- Distributed by: Warner Bros. Productions; The Vitaphone Corporation
- Release date: February 8, 1936
- Running time: 7 mins
- Country: United States
- Language: English

The Cat Came Back is a 1936 American animated comedy short film directed by Isadore Freleng. The short was released on February 8, 1936. It is the 54th film in the Merrie Melodies series. It was re-released as a "Blue Ribbon" reissue in 1944 and 1954, rendering the original film and credits lost to this day.

== Plot ==
A group of kittens play while their mother knit. A group of mice are lectured by their mother about the dangers of cats. Meanwhile, the mother cat lectures her children to hate and catch mice. A kitten hits a mouse punching bag, which is then broken by the second kitten. The mother mouse trains her children to avoid cat paws. The mother cat trains her children to catch mice, while the mother mouse trains her children to avoid mousetraps.

A kitten and mouse sneak out at the same time and encounter each other. While they realize each other are no threat, the mother mouse finds them and takes away the mouse. The curious kitten walks inside and is beat up by the mother mouse, so it describes its ordeal to its mother and lead her there. The mother mouse pokes the mother cat's eyes.

Some time later, the mouse goads the kitten to sneak out. They listen to a record of the titular song and dance to it. The kitten accidentally falls into the sewers, to the horror of its mother; the mouse immediately jumps in. Their mothers share a mutual understanding in their perceived loss of their children. As the kitten holds onto a cuckoo clock, the mouse rows on a broken guitar to his direction. As the kitten is pulled into a whirlpool near an exit, the mouse jumps into a plank on the top and allows the cat to climb up through its tail, causing it to spin like a helicopter and into a street. They return to their mothers, who accidentally hug each other's child. The kittens and mice make peace with each other; the mother cat remembers the mother mouse's treatment of her and pokes her in the eye, so they fight while their children follow suit.

== Home media ==
- LaserDisc - The Golden Age of Looney Tunes, Volume 5, Side 5, Pesky Pets (USA 1995 Turner print)
- Blu-ray - included as a special feature on the Warner Archive release of The Walking Dead (1936)
