= The Banker's Daughter =

1927 film

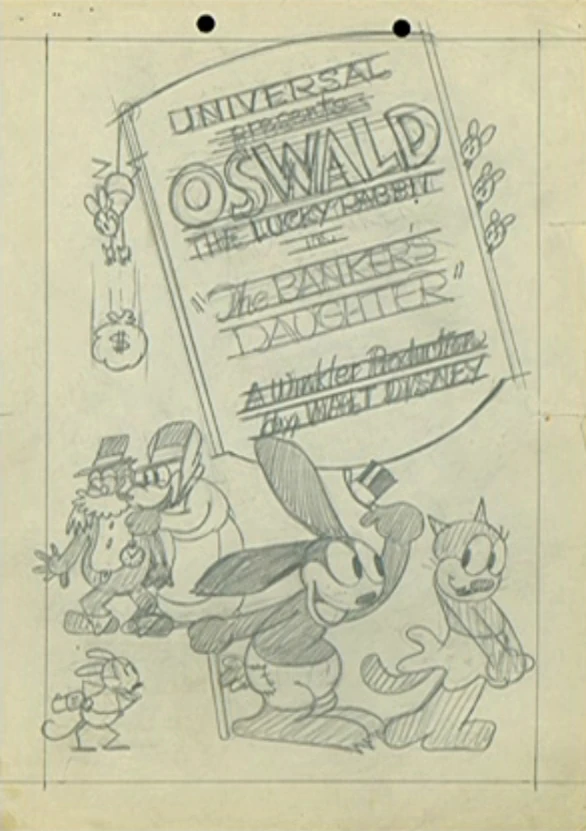
- Poster sketch
- Directed by: Walt Disney; Friz Freleng
- Produced by: Charles Mintz; George Winkler
- Animation by: Ub Iwerks; Friz Freleng
- Color process: Black and white
- Production company: Winkler Pictures
- Distributed by: Universal Pictures
- Release date: November 28, 1927
- Running time: 6 minutes (unconfirmed)
- Country: United States
- Language: English (slient)

The Banker's Daughter is a 1927 animated short film directed by Walt Disney and Friz Freleng and distributed by Universal Pictures. It was Freleng's directorial debut, starting a career that would lead to his success as a director at Warner Bros. Cartoons. It was released on November 28, 1927. It is the earliest known Oswald the Lucky Rabbit shorts to remain lost, as Universal lost most of their pre-1935 cartoons out of neglect, while The Walt Disney Company could not find any surviving film prints. The only known elements to exist are the poster sketch, a production script, five story sketch pages and two animation drawings.

== Plot ==
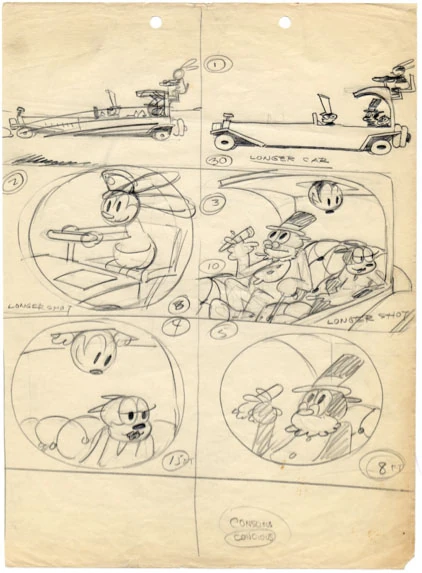
A story sketch for the start of the short

Oswald is driving a banker and his daughter (Sadie) in a fancy car. He gets fired for kissing Sadie and Sadie gets a dog muzzle put on her.

We cut to Pete and some 'gangsta rats' planning to rob the bank. They disguise themselves as a lady pushing a pram. We cut to a dog security guard outside of the bank. He flirts with the lady (Pete) and tries to look into the pram. The rats jump out of the pram and knock the guard out cold with clubs and stuff him in a fire hydrant.

We cut to Pete at the bank. The rats run to corners of building and raise it up. Pete rushes in and we hear a commotion. A safe walks out with hands above head and Pete sticking gun in ribs with Sadie following behind. Oswald runs out and the rats let building fall on Oswald's neck as they run off. As he tries to get out, his body snaps in half across his waist. Oswald runs and yells "TAXI!" and cow with a cab strapped to its back comes to him and shoves him in with its tail. The cow comes to a lake and keeps going. As the cab rises out of the water, we see a dachshund carrying the cab instead of the cow.

We cut to a shack at the edge of a cliff. The rats run the safe into the shack. Pete follows with Sadie. We cut to Oswald using the dachshund as a toboggan and he slides down the hill. The dachshund smashes into a rock and gets squished. Oswald falls off and lands by the shack. he watches through the window. We cut to Sadie being tied to the safe. Pete pulls out a big bomb and lights the fuse. He puts it under the safe and laughs.

We cut to Oswald moving the door so it opens onto the cliff. Oswald sneaks in the door and yells at Pete and the rats. They all leap at him and Oswald swings out on the door. He hangs onto the doorknob as Pete and the rats fall out and down the cliff. We cut to Oswald in the shack, freeing Sadie. They kiss. The shack explodes and Oswald and Sadie are still kissing. Oswald notices the audience watching and pulls the curtains across.
