= Buddy's Trolley Troubles =

1934 film by Isadore Freleng

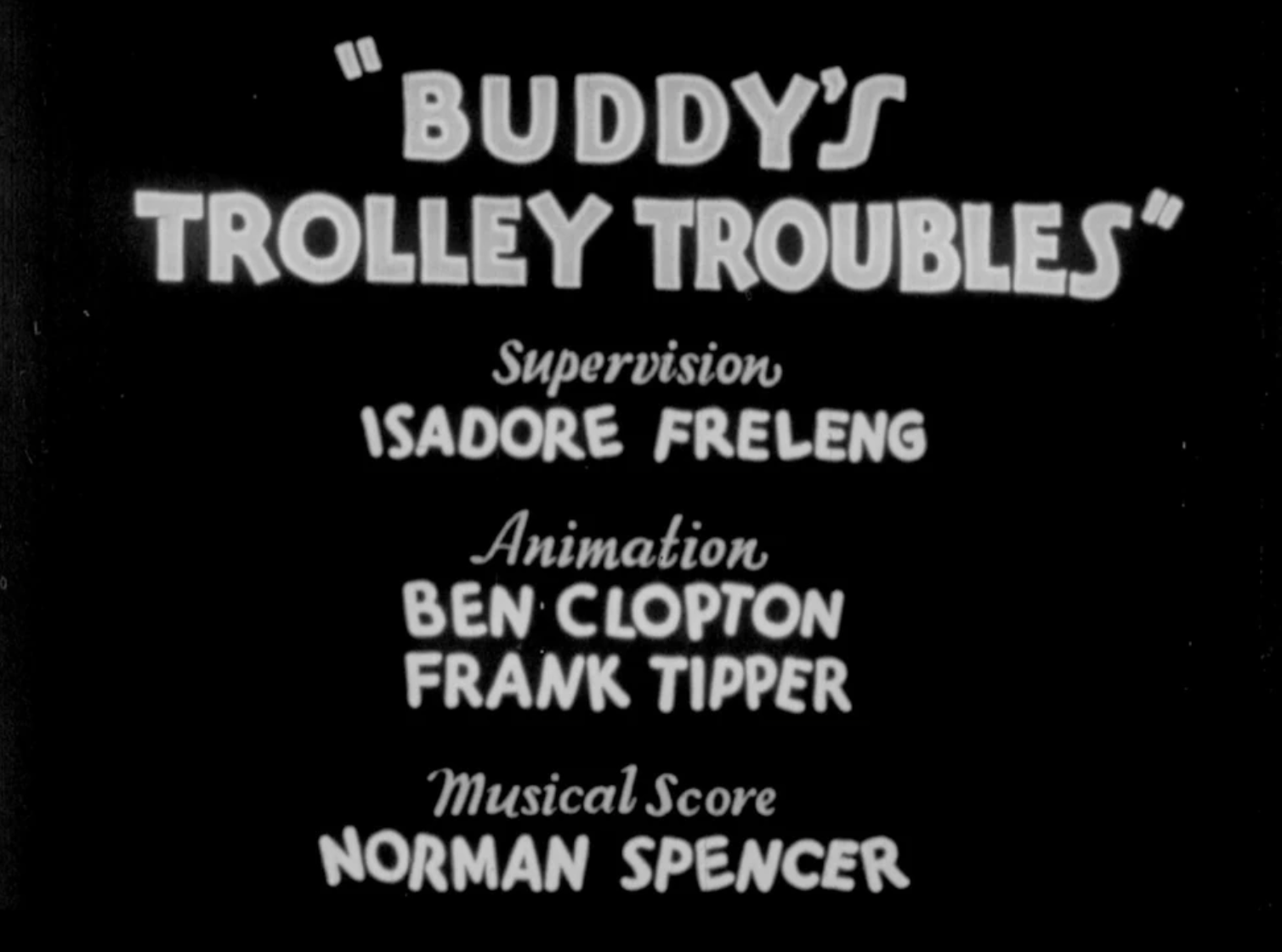
- Title card
- Directed by: Isadore Freleng
- Produced by: Leon Schlesinger
- Starring: Bernard Brown; Shirley Reed
- Music by: Norman Spencer
- Animation by: Ben Clopton; Frank Tipper
- Color process: Black-and-white
- Production company: Leon Schlesinger Productions
- Distributed by: Warner Bros. Pictures; The Vitaphone Corporation
- Release date: May 5, 1934
- Running time: 7 minutes
- Country: United States
- Language: English

Buddy's Trolley Troubles is an American animated comedy short film directed by Isadore Freleng. It was released on May 5, 1934. It is the 45th film in the Looney Tunes series and the seventh cartoon to feature Buddy.

== Plot ==
Buddy operates a tram line. He leaves home for work, using a fence as a track to load his tram from his shed. He stops for a large lady, whom he assists in boarding the tram, and starts again before a male passenger can board. The man chases the tram and gets on board, where he finds a slot machine that rewards him with loads of coins out of good luck.

Buddy arrives at Cookie's apartment by physically lifting the tram, causing traffic congestion while he flirts with Cookie, causing him to be scolded by a traffic police officer, who lets him go after Cookie's intervention. Buddy secretly activates an arm-shaped sign with the same gesture to hit the officer after he leaves. They accidentally go on train tracks, forcing Buddy to speed through and outrun a train, which they succeed by ascending through a bridge.

An escaped prisoner flings his ball and chain onto the tracks, which Buddy's tram inadvertently helps break. He sneaks on the tram and seizes control after punching Buddy away. The tram twists and turns through various absurdly shaped tracks while Buddy gives chase in a handcar. Buddy catches up and uses the tram's crane to reach the prisoner and kick him, while removing Cookie from the tram just in time for the tram to hit a malfunctioning car holding dynamite, which its owner could not fix in time. The prisoner is held in place with the fence of a sty, while piglets mock his futile escape attempt.
