= Flowers for Madame =

1935 film by Isadore Freleng

- Directed by: Isadore Freleng
- Produced by: Leon Schlesinger
- Music by: Norman Spencer
- Animation by: Paul Smith; Don Williams
- Color process: Technicolor
- Production company: Leon Schlesinger Productions
- Distributed by: Warner Bros. Pictures; The Vitaphone Corporation
- Release date: November 20, 1935
- Running time: 7 min
- Country: United States
- Language: English

Flowers for Madame is a 1935 American animated comedy short film directed by Isadore Freleng. The short was released on November 20, 1935. It is the 52nd film in the Merrie Melodies series. It is also the first film in the series to use 3-strip Technicolor, as Walt Disney Productions' 3-strip Technicolor exclusivity deal expired after its release; the film is a pastiche of Disney's Silly Symphony cartoon Flowers and Trees. It was re-released as a "Blue Ribbon" reissue in 1953, rendering the original film and credits lost to this day.

== Plot ==
Flowers come to life and sing the titular song. They use other objects and flowers like musical instruments and umbrellas. Meanwhile, a flower pageant occurs, starting with an insect marching band leading the competitors. A cactus watching the commotion goes to his car and plants blue flowers near its wheel to drive to the judge. Unfortunately, the judge does not like the sight, causing the car to explode to the cactus' embarrassment.

Elsewhere, a poorly placed magnifying glass next to a dropped match causes it to be lit, burning the nearby grass and starting a wildfire. As the fire comes to life and a small fire gremlin chases a flower, a bellflower gathers water from a nearby river and sprays it on the gremlin, killing it. Another gremlin chases a snail, who is spooked into running in supersonic speeds and stops at a lily pad on a pond. The cactus sees the fire and runs to an irrigation system, which works temporarily, until a fire gremlin kicks him from behind and turns off the system. The cactus runs to a watermelon field and pokes them to unleash a great amount of water, which extinguishes the fire. As the cactus is hailed as a hero, the fire gremlin hides from a grasshopper, who spots it and kills it by spitting tobacco.
