= The Merry Old Soul (1935 film) =

1935 film by Isadore Freleng

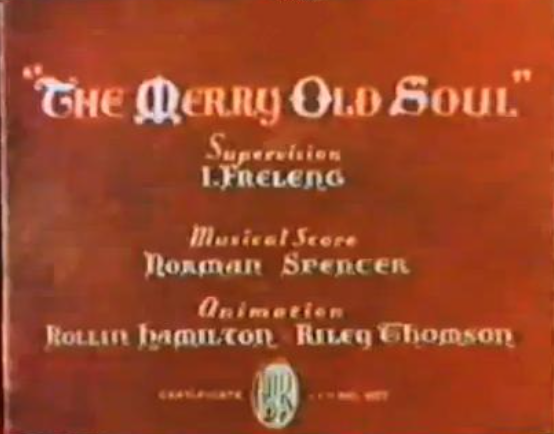
- Original title card
- Directed by: Isadore Freleng
- Produced by: Leon Schlesinger
- Music by: Norman Spencer
- Animation by: Rollin Hamilton; Riley Thomson
- Color process: Technicolor
- Production company: Leon Schlesinger Productions
- Distributed by: Warner Bros. Productions; The Vitaphone Corporation
- Release date: August 17, 1935
- Running time: 7 min
- Country: United States
- Language: English

The Merry Old Soul is a 1935 animated comedy short film directed by Isadore Freleng. It was released to theaters on August 2, 1935. It is the 50th film in the Merrie Melodies series. It was re-released as a "Blue Ribbon" reissue in 1952.

== Plot ==
A group of commoners and fantastical objects sing the titular song about "Old King Cole". Meanwhile, the actual Old King Cole had just married an old woman who lived in a shoe, and had retired to her shoe house to become a stay-at-home dad, much to the chagrin of the crowd who pelts boots at him, with him choosing one pair before leaving. Cole immediately begins to regret his decision as the woman's infant children start to appear in the dozens, overwhelming him.

Some time later, Old King Cole bathes the children and is being spied on by the three commoner from the beginning of the film, which he reacts to by slamming the windows and curtains shut. An assembly line that automates the process are shown, which clean the babies until Cole sprinkles baby powder on each of them. Cole then ties each baby to a balloon to transport them to a table where he puts on their diapers, with a separate assembly line for dressing them into their clothes and placing them into their beds. Exhausted, Cole operates a machine that rocks the babies to sleep as he sings a lullaby. He tries to sneak away but the babies start crying, causing him to speed up the process and immediately sneak off to sleep at a chair. However, two babies learn how to sneak from him and rapidly operates the mechanism, causing the babies to be rocked at a high speed and fall on Cole, who is displeased with the act and breaks down under stress.
