= Why Do I Dream Those Dreams =

1934 film by Isadore Freleng

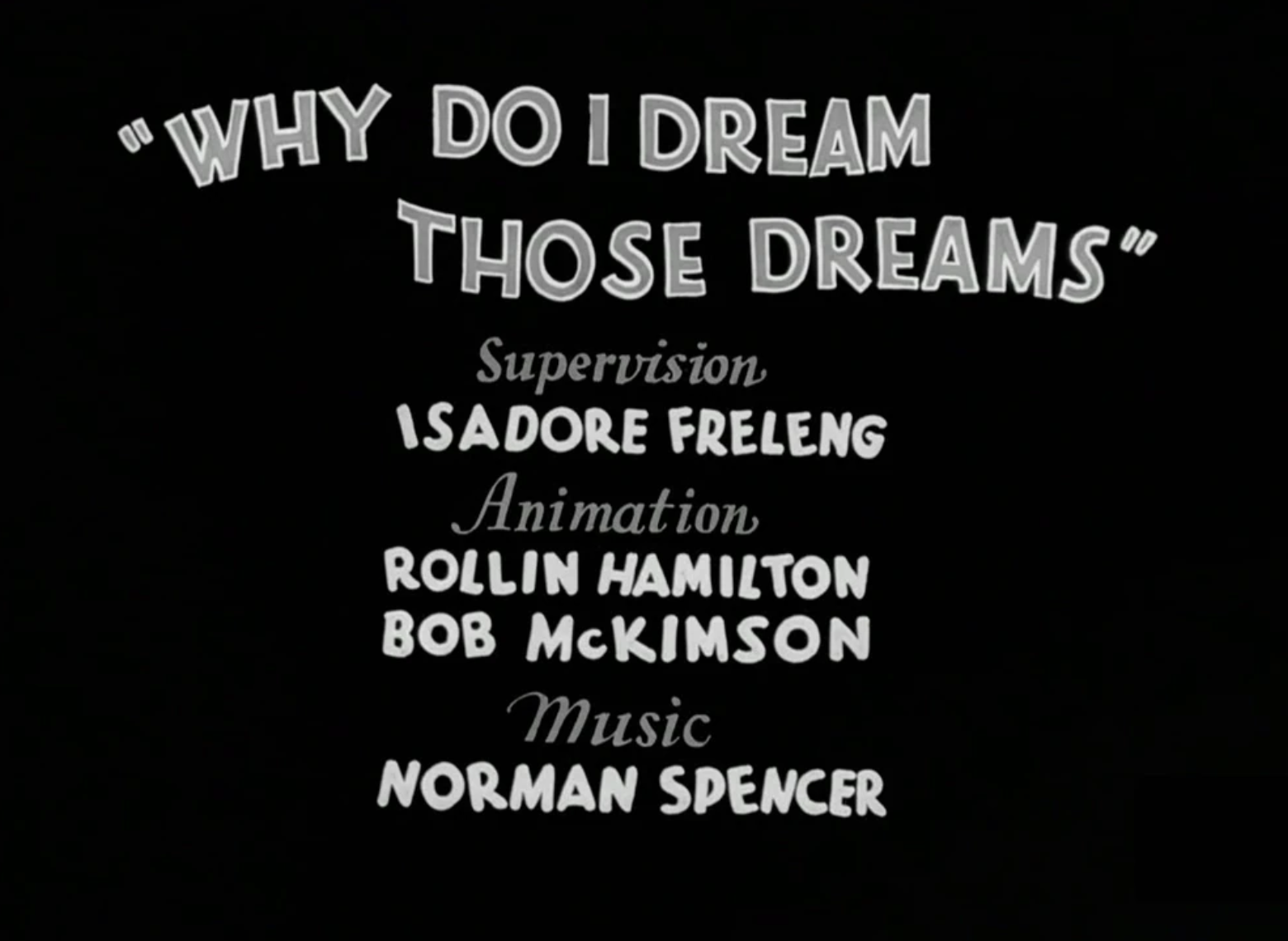
- Title card
- Directed by: Isadore Freleng
- Produced by: Leon Schlesinger
- Music by: Norman Spencer
- Animation by: Rollin Hamilton; Robert McKimson
- Color process: Black-and-white
- Production company: Leon Schlesinger Productions
- Distributed by: Warner Bros. Pictures; The Vitaphone Corporation
- Release date: June 30, 1934
- Running time: 7 min
- Country: United States
- Language: English

Why Do I Dream Those Dreams is a 1934 American animated comedy short film directed by Isadore Freleng. It was originally released on June 30, 1934, a day before the Hays Code was enforced, making it the final pre-Code cartoon to be released by Warner Bros. Pictures. It is the 36th film in the Merrie Melodies series, featuring the titular song by Dick Powell. It is a fantasy rendition of "Rip Van Winkle".

== Plot ==
Rip Van Winkle and his dog are thrown out of his house by his wife. After his dog briefly returns to insult his wife, Rip sings the titular song and attracts a crowd of children. Rip goes fishing with a mousetrap, only to be thwarted easily by a fish who uses a branch to toggle the trap.

Leprechauns appear and drink alcohol, sing and dance to the titular song. They find Rip asleep and look at his "French" post cards, entertaining them with the implied risqué content. They play with his shotgun and wake him up, scurrying into their houses when Rip notices them. Rip immediately drinks one of the small barrels of alcohol, only to shrink to the size of a leprechaun. His dog is shocked by the size change and chases him. Rip rides a grasshopper and lands on a spider web, where he helplessly watches a spider approach and eat him.

20 years later, Rip wakes up with disheveled white hair and a long white beard. His dog visits him with a large number of puppies he had conceived, happy that his owner is alive. Rip is grateful for his dog's faithfulness.
