= Bingo Crosbyana =

1936 film by Isadore Freleng

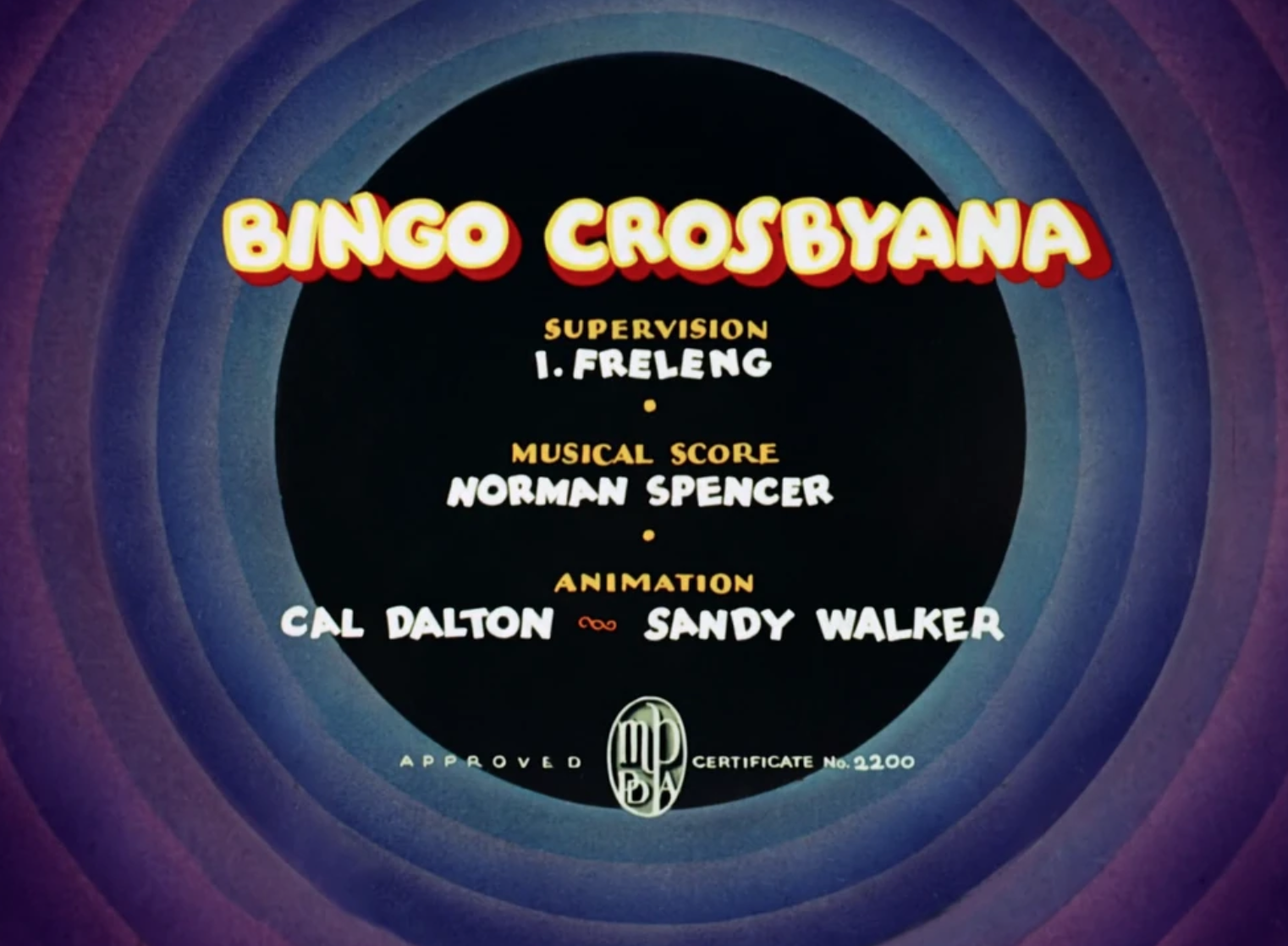
- Title card
- Directed by: Isadore Freleng
- Produced by: Leon Schlesinger
- Starring: Billy Bletcher; Jerry Stewart
- Music by: Norman Spencer
- Animation by: Cal Dalton; Sandy Walker
- Color process: Technicolor
- Production company: Leon Schlesinger Productions
- Distributed by: Warner Bros. Productions; The Vitaphone Corporation
- Release date: May 30, 1936
- Running time: 7 min
- Country: United States
- Language: English

Bingo Crosbyana is a 1936 American animated comedy short film directed by Isadore Freleng. The short was released on May 30, 1936. It is the 59th film in the Merrie Melodies series, featuring the titular song by Sanford Green and Irving Kahal.

Bingo Crosbyana was one of two cartoons (along with Let It Be Me) which Bing Crosby initiated lawsuits against Warner Bros. Pictures to suppress because they portrayed him in what Crosby considered a defamatory light. In this case, he objected to his portrayal as a vainglorious coward and to the imitation of his voice. According to The Hollywood Reporter, Paramount Pictures, distributor of Crosby's films, was suing Warner Bros. with him. Their law firm wanted the distribution of the film to cease. Apparently they lost their case.

== Plot ==
A group of insects take over a kitchen after its owner leaves, having haphazardly prepared a meal of canned spaghetti beforehand. As the spaghetti are devoured by two flies, three more drink the juice of an orange with macaroni as straws. A confused fly attempts to shoot a pea on top of another, prompting the other fly to switch the pea for a pumpkin, only to be shot into a wall instead.

Meanwhile, female insects become enthralled by a crooning show-off of a fly, Bingo Crosbyana, a caricature of the singer Bing Crosby, who is doused with milk by an old insect whose daughter is enthralled by the music. While three female insects sing the titular song, Bingo flirts with female insects. To impress them, he flies and does loops in the sky, earning the wrath of the male insects, as well as a cuckoo on a cuckoo clock whose false plumage and tail are removed by him passing by. He removes the button with a needle, and uses a match to create the words "How'm I doin" with smoke, impressing the female insects. He dances to the titular song with one insect.

A spider appears in an attempt to eat the insects, causing Bingo to literally show his true colors (yellow) and cower in a cup of water, and eventually a roll of wax paper. The male insects knock the spider out of the wax paper and electrocute it, causing it to land into a sheet of fly paper, immobilizing him. Bingo attempts to be take credit, only to be met with disappointment from the insects and launched into a cup of tea.

== Sources ==
- Cohen, Karl F. (2004), "Censorship of Theatrical Animation", Forbidden Animation: Censored Cartoons and Blacklisted Animators in America, McFarland & Company, ISBN 978-0786420322
