= Pigs Is Pigs (1937 film) =

1937 film by Isadore Freleng

Pigs is Pigs
- Blue Ribbon re-release lobby card, 1947
- Directed by: Isadore Freleng
- Produced by: Leon Schlesinger
- Music by: Carl W. Stalling
- Animation by: Bob McKimson; Paul Smith
- Color process: Technicolor
- Production company: Leon Schlesinger Productions
- Distributed by: Warner Bros. Productions; The Vitaphone Corporation
- Release date: January 30, 1937
- Running time: 7 min
- Country: United States
- Language: English

Pigs Is Pigs is a 1937 American animated comedy short film directed by Isadore Freleng. The short was released on January 30, 1937. It is the 69th film in the Merrie Melodies series and the first to not revolve around an existing musical number. It is a sequel to At Your Service Madame, featuring characters from that film. It was re-released as a "Blue Ribbon" reissue in 1947, rendering the original film and credits lost.

== Plot ==
Piggy Hamhock is a gluttonous pig who always thinks of eating and stealing food whenever he can. He eats a pie set aside by his mother, much to her chagrin. During dinner, he ties his siblings' plates of spaghetti to his as they pray, and devours them all in one bite. Piggy's mother scolds him and warns Piggy that he may explode if his bad eating habits persist.

At night, Piggy continues to fantasize about food and falls asleep. In a dream sequence, he meets a mad scientist, who tempts him with a large feast and does not take caution at his suspicious surroundings. The mad scientist straps Piggy into a mechanical chair, using a wide variety of machinations to force-feed Piggy with soup, olives, bananas, pies, sandwiches, and ice cream until Piggy is morbidly obese and bulging out of the chair. Despite this, he does not care and eats a turkey drumstick used to tempt him earlier, only to explode. He writhes in pain in his bed, only to wake up and quickly eat breakfast, having not learned a single thing from the nightmare.

== Home media ==
The short was released on disc 3 of the Looney Tunes Golden Collection: Volume 3 DVD set.

== Legacy ==
The film is parodied in The Simpsons episode "Treehouse of Horror IV", through a scene set in Hell where Homer Simpson is fed all the doughnuts in the world, yet still asks for more.

== See also ==
- Gluttony
- Merrie Melodies
- Termite Terrace
- Looney Tunes and Merrie Melodies filmography (1929–1939)
- Carrapatos e Catapultas
