= The Little Dutch Plate =

1935 film by Isadore Freleng

- Title card
- Directed by: Isadore Freleng
- Produced by: Leon Schlesinger
- Music by: Norman Spencer
- Animation by: Paul Smith; Bob Clampett
- Color process: Technicolor
- Production company: Leon Schlesinger Productions
- Distributed by: Warner Bros. Productions; The Vitaphone Corporation
- Release date: October 19, 1935
- Running time: 7 min
- Country: United States
- Language: English

The Little Dutch Plate is a 1935 American animated comedy short film directed by Isadore Freleng. The short was released on October 19, 1935. It is the 50th film in the Merrie Melodies series. It was re-released as a "Blue Ribbon" reissue as Little Dutch Plate in 1953, rendering the original film lost to this day, though Bob Clampett kept a cel of the original credits.

== Plot ==
In a kitchen in the Netherlands, a girl mascot on a plate falls in love with a salt shaker boy. As other mascots sing the titular song, the duo dance. Meanwhile, an evil landlord bottle of vinegar spots them and makes his way to them through a mousetrap, jamming his head in his top hat in the process. He forces them to either pay a mortgage or kick the girl out of a windmill house. The boy claims to be able to pay it.

Some time later, the boy finds 1 cent in a piggy bank and is depressed, only to find three dentures used by the owner's family. He blows up the dad's dentures and collects golden false teeth, while the girl is imprisoned in a clock. He slams the vinegar bottle and saves the girl, knocking off his head in the process. Unfortunately, the vinegar bottle finds a more attractive head and causes the girl to fall in love with him instead, much to the boy's chagrin.

Throughout the film, the cuckoo clock repeatedly reaches 12 a.m. multiple times, only for a Native American on top to smack the cuckoo and adjust the clock to 11:30 p.m. At the end of the film, the cuckoo shoots the Native American and happily sounds the alarm.
