= Let It Be Me (1936 film) =

1936 film by Isadore Freleng

- Directed by: Isadore Freleng
- Produced by: Leon Schlesinger
- Starring: Jerry Stewart; Bernice Hansen; Jack Carr; Jeane Cowan
- Music by: Bernard Brown
- Animation by: Bob McKimson; Don Williams
- Color process: Technicolor
- Production company: Leon Schlesinger Productions
- Distributed by: Warner Bros. Productions; The Vitaphone Corporation
- Release date: May 2, 1936
- Running time: 7 min
- Country: United States
- Language: English

Let It Be Me is a 1936 American animated comedy short film directed by Isadore Freleng. The short was released on May 2, 1936. It is the 57th film in the Merrie Melodies series. It was re-released as a "Blue Ribbon" reissue in 1944, rendering the original film and credits lost to this day. It is the final film in the series to be scored by Bernard Brown, as he was replaced by Carl W. Stalling after Norman Spencer's resignation.

This cartoon, along with Bingo Crosbyana were the two cartoons cited by Bing Crosby in his lawsuits against Warner Bros. to suppress because they portrayed him in what Crosby considered a defamatory light. In this case, he objected to his portrayal as unfaithful to women and to the imitation of his voice. According to The Hollywood Reporter, Paramount Pictures, distributor of Crosby's films, was suing Warner Bros. with him. Their law firm wanted the distribution of the film to cease. Apparently they lost their case.

== Plot ==
The rooster crooner Mr. Bingo (a caricature of Bing Crosby) sings on radio while numerous hen paparazzi listen outside. A hen is caught listening to him by her boyfriend, who takes her photograph of Bingo and stomps it much to Emily's sorrow. As Bingo finishes his performance, he politely greets the paparazzi and throws an orange flower to them, causing them to fight over it.

At the countryside, Clem the rooster walks to his girlfriend Emily's house to give her flowers and propose marriage, only for Bingo to drive by, and to Emily's astonishment, stops and acknowledges her. To Clem's horror, Emily, madly in love, wastes no time in leaving with him. Bingo and Emily eat at a fancy nightclub, where Emily tries alcohol when urged by Bingo, only to dislike its taste. A singing French hen (a caricature of Irene Bordoni) attracts Bingo's attention to the point he disregards Emily's complaints, and he orders a waiter to throw her out of the nightclub.

Unable to face Clem at home, Emily spends an unspecified amount of time selling violets in a futile attempt to earn income. Meanwhile, Clem is unable to handle Emily's departure, and when he hears Bingo on the radio, destroys it in anger. He walks to the radio station where he beats Bingo to unconsciousness on air during a performance. He walks home but discovers Emily selling violets, so they happily reunite after Emily apologizes. The two marry and have children, one of which sings like Bingo while reading off an ill-placed piano book, much to its father's chagrin.

== Home media ==
- LaserDisc - The Golden Age of Looney Tunes, Volume 4, Side 5
- DVD - Follow the Fleet
- Blu-ray - Looney Tunes Collector's Vault: Volume 1, Disc 1

== Sources ==
- Cohen, Karl F. (2004), "Censorship of Theatrical Animation", Forbidden Animation: Censored Cartoons and Blacklisted Animators in America, McFarland & Company, ISBN 978-0786420322
