= Friz Freleng =

American animator, cartoonist, director, and producer (1905–1995)

- Born: Isadore Freleng; August 21, 1905; Kansas City, Missouri, U.S.
- Died: May 26, 1995 (aged 89); Los Angeles, California, U.S.
- Resting place: Hillside Memorial Park Cemetery
- Other names: I. Freleng; Congressman Frizby
- Occupation: Animator
- Years active: 1923–1986
- Employer(s): Winkler Pictures (1927–1930); Harman-Ising (1929–1933); Leon Schlesinger Productions/Warner Bros. Cartoons (1933–1937, 1939–1962); MGM (1937–1939); Hanna-Barbera (1962–1963); DePatie–Freleng Enterprises (1963–1981); Warner Bros. Animation (1981–1986)
- Spouse: Lily Schoenfeld (m. 1932)
- Children: 2

Isadore "Friz" Freleng (/ˈfriːləŋ/ FREE-ləng; August 21, 1905 (Note: Many sources give his year of birth as 1906, but his 1940 census record and his obituary from the Kansas City Public Library both give 1905.) – May 26, 1995), credited as I. Freleng early in his career, was an American animator known for his work at Warner Bros. Cartoons (WB) on the Looney Tunes and Merrie Melodies series of cartoons from the 1930s to the early 1960s. In total, he created more than 300 cartoons.

He introduced and/or developed several of the studio's biggest stars, including Bugs Bunny, Porky Pig, Tweety, Sylvester, Yosemite Sam (to whom he was said to bear more than a passing resemblance), Granny, and Speedy Gonzales. Freleng directed more cartoons than any other director in the studio (a total of 266) and is also the most officially honored of the WB directors, having won five Academy Awards and three Emmy Awards. After WB closed down the animation studio in 1963, Freleng and business partner David H. DePatie founded DePatie–Freleng Enterprises, which produced cartoons (including The Pink Panther Show), feature-film title sequences, and Saturday-morning cartoons. After the company's dissolution in 1981, Freleng joined Warner Bros.' relaunched animation division and produced several Looney Tunes one-off specials and compilation films.

The nickname "Friz" came from his friend, Hugh Harman, who initially nicknamed him "Congressman Frizby" after a fictional senator who appeared in satirical pieces in the Los Angeles Examiner, due to the character's strong resemblance to him. Over time, this shortened to "Friz".

William Schallert claimed that Freleng was the model for Mr. Magoo due to his physical appearance.

== Early career ==
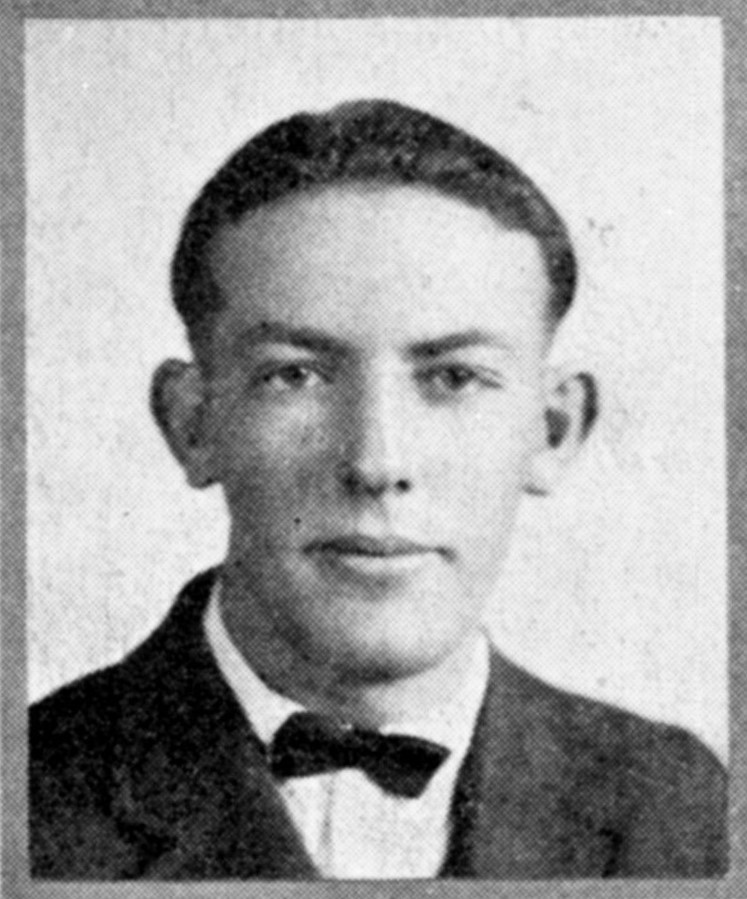
Yearbook photo

Freleng was born to Louis Mendel Freleng, a Polish Jewish immigrant from Kutno, and Elka (née Ribakoff) Freleng, a Ukrainian Jewish immigrant from Odesa Oblast, in Kansas City, Missouri, where he attended Westport High School from 1919 to 1923 and where began his career in animation at the United Film Ad Service. There, he made the acquaintance of fellow animators Hugh Harman and Ub Iwerks. One of Freleng's brothers, Allen Freleng, followed him to Winkler and MGM until he died in 1943.

In 1923, Iwerks's friend at Laugh-O-Gram Studio, Walt Disney, moved to Hollywood and put out a call for his Kansas City colleagues to join him. Freleng, however, held out until January 1927, when he finally moved to California and joined them at Winkler Pictures. He worked alongside other former Kansas City animators, including Iwerks, Harman, Carman Maxwell, and Rudolf Ising. At Winkler, Freleng worked on the Alice Comedies and Universal Pictures' Oswald the Lucky Rabbit cartoons. Freleng said in an interview with Michael Barrier that Walt had shown patience and a willingness to teach in letters prior to joining him, but proved to be too heavy-handed with his fiery temper. Freleng co-directed The Banker's Daughter and Rickety Gin with Disney in 1927. In 1928 Freleng called in sick with a painful boil, but decided to attend the cinema rather than to rest at home, that evening, he encountered Disney on the way, who fired Freleng the next day for his dishonesty and attempt to forfeit, but ultimately relented to pay him his promised bonus. Freleng moved back to Missouri to work at his old job at the United Film Ad Service. Disney regarded Freleng highly as an animator during his brief time in the studio, occasionally screening his future shorts at Walt Disney Productions, though he derisively referred to Freleng as "I. P. Freely".

Freleng returned to Winkler Pictures after producer Charles Mintz lured him with a higher wage than Walt Disney's payments, working until 1930, when Carl Laemmle terminated Winkler's contract in favor of an in-house studio headed by his colleagues Walter Lantz and Bill Nolan. Freleng soon teamed up with Harman and Ising to create their own studio. The trio produced a pilot film starring a new Mickey Mouse-like character named Bosko. Looking at unemployment if the cartoon failed to generate interest, Freleng returned to Winkler to work on Krazy Kat cartoons, all the while still trying to sell the Harman-Ising Bosko picture. Freleng was very unhappy living in New York City and made the best of it until another opportunity opened for him. Bosko was finally sold to Leon Schlesinger, who produced the series for Warner Bros. Pictures. At first, Freleng was reluctant to return to California when Harman and Ising asked him to work on the series. At the insistence of his sister Jean, Freleng soon moved back to California to work on the Bosko series, ultimately released under the title Looney Tunes. A prominent animator on the series, Freleng was eventually delegated co-directorial duties on shorts such as Bosko's Picture Show.

== Freleng as director ==
=== Early Schlesinger cartoons ===
Harman and Ising (alongside their crew of animators) terminated their contract with Schlesinger over a budget dispute in 1933. Schlesinger was left with no experienced directors, so he lured Freleng away from Harman-Ising, after Tom Palmer was fired for his poor work on Buddy's Day Out. The young animator rapidly became Schlesinger's top director, helming the majority of the higher-budgeted Merrie Melodies shorts during the mid-1930s, and he introduced the studio's first true post-Bosko star, Porky Pig, in the film, I Haven't Got a Hat (1935). Porky was a distinctive character, unlike Bosko's replacement, Buddy, as well as the film's intended protagonist Beans.

As a director, Freleng gained the reputation of a tough taskmaster. His unit, however, consistently produced high-quality animated shorts under his direction.

Friz Freleng directed the largest number of cartoons on the Censored Eleven, a group of Looney Tunes and Merrie Melodies cartoons originally produced and released by WB that were withheld from syndication in the United States by United Artists (UA) in 1968 because the use of ethnic stereotypes in the cartoons, specifically African stereotypes, was deemed too offensive for contemporary audiences.

David H. DePatie, when asked about the Japanese beetle in the Blue Racer in 1996, said this about Freleng's view on race, "It seems like poking fun at certain ethnic groups had always spelled success. Friz had always felt that way in his cartoons, especially with Speedy."

=== Metro-Goldwyn-Mayer ===
In September 1937, Freleng left Schlesinger after accepting an increase in salary to direct for the new Metro-Goldwyn-Mayer (MGM) cartoon department headed by Fred Quimby. As a consequence of that, Frank Tashlin took over Freleng's unit, while Cal Howard (later Ben Hardaway) and Cal Dalton took over Tashlin's old unit. Freleng served as a director on The Captain and the Kids, an animated series adapted from the comic strip of the same name (an alternate version of The Katzenjammer Kids), which was received poorly compared to Harman and Ising's Happy Harmonies series, leading to Freleng being reunited with his former co-workers and becoming a "junior director" under Hugh Harman. Freleng quit MGM in April 1939.

=== Back with Schlesinger and Warner Bros. ===
Freleng happily returned to Schlesinger and Warner Bros. in mid-April 1939 when his MGM contract ended and as a result, Ben Hardaway and Cal Dalton were demoted, with Freleng assuming leadership of their former unit; Freleng's original unit had since come under the supervision of Chuck Jones. One of the first Looney Tunes cartoon shorts directed by Freleng during his second tenure at Schlesinger's studio was You Ought to Be in Pictures, a cartoon short that blended animation with live-action footage of Schlesinger's studio (and included staff such as story man Michael Maltese and Schlesinger himself). The plot, which centers around Porky Pig being tricked by Daffy Duck into terminating his contract with Schlesinger to attempt a career in features, echoes Freleng's experience in moving to MGM.

=== Directorial achievements ===
Snafuperman, a Private Snafu cartoon directed by Freleng in 1944

Schlesinger's hands-off attitude toward his animators allowed Freleng and his fellow directors almost complete creative control and room to experiment with cartoon comedy styles, which allowed the studio to keep pace with the Disney studio's technical superiority. Freleng's style quickly matured, and he became a master of comic timing. During World War II, he directed several propaganda cartoons, contributing to the Private Snafu series and directing shorts such as Daffy – The Commando (1943), Bugs Bunny Nips the Nips (1944), and Herr Meets Hare (1945). Often working alongside layout artist Hawley Pratt and writer Warren Foster, he also introduced or redesigned a number of WB characters, including Yosemite Sam in 1945, the cat-and-bird duo Sylvester and Tweety in 1947, and Speedy Gonzales in 1955.

Freleng and Chuck Jones dominated Warner Bros. Cartoons in the years after World War II, with Freleng largely concentrating on the above-mentioned characters, as well as Bugs Bunny. Freleng continued to produce modernized versions of the musical comedies he animated in his early career, such as Three Little Bops (1957) and Pizzicato Pussycat (1955). He won four Oscars during his time at WB, for the films Tweetie Pie (1947), Speedy Gonzales (1955), Birds Anonymous (1957), and Knighty Knight Bugs (1958). Other Freleng cartoons, such as Sandy Claws (1955), Mexicali Shmoes (1959), Mouse and Garden (1960), and The Pied Piper of Guadalupe (1961) were Oscar nominees.

Freleng's cartoon, Show Biz Bugs (1957), with Daffy Duck vying with Bugs Bunny for theatre audience appreciation, was arguably a template for the successful format of The Bugs Bunny Show that premiered on television in the autumn of 1960. Further, Freleng directed the cartoons with the erudite and ever-so-polite Goofy Gophers encountering the relentless wheels of human industry, those being I Gopher You (1954) and Lumber Jerks (1955), and he also directed three cartoons (sponsored by the Alfred P. Sloan Foundation) extolling the virtues of free-market capitalism: By Word of Mouse (1954), Heir-Conditioned (1955), and Yankee Dood It (1956), all of which involved Sylvester. Freleng directed all three of the vintage WB cartoons in which a drinking of Dr. Jekyll's potion (of The Strange Case of Dr. Jekyll and Mr. Hyde) induced a series of monstrous transformations: Dr. Jerkyl's Hide (1954), Hyde and Hare (1955), and Hyde and Go Tweet (1960). Other Freleng fancies were man at war with the insect world (as in Of Thee I Sting (1946) and Ant Pasted (1953)), an inebriated stork delivering the wrong baby (in A Mouse Divided (1952), Stork Naked (1955), and Apes of Wrath (1959)), and characters marrying for money and finding themselves with a shrewish wife and a troublesome stepson (His Bitter Half (1949) and Honey's Money (1962)).

Freleng was occasionally the subject of in-jokes in WB cartoons. In Canary Row (1950), billboards in the background of scenes advertised various products called "Friz". The "Hotel Friz" was featured in Racketeer Rabbit (1946) and "Frizby the Magician" was one of the acts Bugs Bunny pitched in High Diving Hare (1949).

=== Musical knowledge and technique ===
Freleng was somewhat of a musical composer and a classically trained violinist, who timed his cartoons on musical bar sheets. Freleng would time gags that best used Carl Stalling, Milt Franklyn, or William Lava's music. He was one of a very few directors at WB to have musical knowledge for making cartoons. Every cartoon Freleng directed from the late 1930s to 1963 was made with his creative musical technique.

=== Hanna-Barbera and DePatie–Freleng Enterprises ===
Before Warner Bros. Cartoons shut down in 1963, Freleng left the studio to take a job at Hanna-Barbera Productions as story supervisor on their first feature, Hey There, It's Yogi Bear! in November 1962. Freleng rented the same space from WB to create cartoons with his now-former boss, producer David H. DePatie (the final producer hired by WB to oversee the cartoon division), forming DePatie–Freleng Enterprises. When WB decided to reopen their cartoon studio in 1964, due to Freleng asking them if he can rent the studio, eventually settling for $500, they did so in name only; DePatie–Freleng produced the cartoons into 1966.

The DePatie–Freleng studio's signature achievement was the Pink Panther. DePatie–Freleng was commissioned to create the opening titles for the feature film The Pink Panther (1963), for which layout artist and director Hawley Pratt and Freleng created a suave, cool-cat character. The Pink Panther cartoon character became so popular that United Artists, distributors of The Pink Panther, had Freleng produce a short cartoon starring the character, The Pink Phink (1964).

After The Pink Phink won the 1965 Academy Award for Best Short Subject (Cartoons), Freleng and DePatie responded by producing a whole series of Pink Panther cartoons. Other original cartoon series, among them The Inspector, The Ant and the Aardvark, Tijuana Toads, The Dogfather, Roland and Rattfink, and Crazylegs Crane, soon followed. In 1969, The Pink Panther Show, a Saturday-morning anthology program featuring DePatie–Freleng cartoons, debuted on NBC. The Pink Panther and the other original DePatie–Freleng series remained in production through 1980, with new cartoons produced for simultaneous Saturday-morning broadcast and United Artists theatrical release.

Layout artist Hawley Pratt, who worked at DePatie–Freleng during the time, is credited with the creation of Frito-Lay's Chester Cheetah, on the Food Network show Deep Fried Treats Unwrapped, though some sources say it was DDB Worldwide, while others credit Brad Morgan. The studio is also known for creating the color opening title sequence for the I Dream of Jeannie television series. DePatie–Freleng also contributed special effects to the original version of Star Wars (1977), particularly the animation of the lightsaber blades, which was done by Korean animator Nelson Shin.

By 1967, DePatie and Freleng had moved their operations to the San Fernando Valley. Their studio was located on Hayvenhurst Avenue in Van Nuys. One of their projects, titled Goldilocks, featured Bing Crosby and his family and had songs by the Sherman Brothers. At their new facilities, they continued to produce new cartoons until 1980, when they sold DePatie–Freleng to Marvel Comics, which renamed it Marvel Productions.

== Later career and death ==
Freleng later served as an executive producer on three 1980s Looney Tunes compilation features, The Looney Looney Looney Bugs Bunny Movie (1981), Bugs Bunny's 3rd Movie: 1001 Rabbit Tales (1982), and Daffy Duck's Fantastic Island (1983), which linked classic shorts with new animated sequences. In 1986, Freleng stepped down and gave his position at WB to his secretary at the time, Kathleen Helppie-Shipley, who ended up being the second-longest producer of the Looney Tunes and Merrie Melodies franchise, behind only Leon Schlesinger.

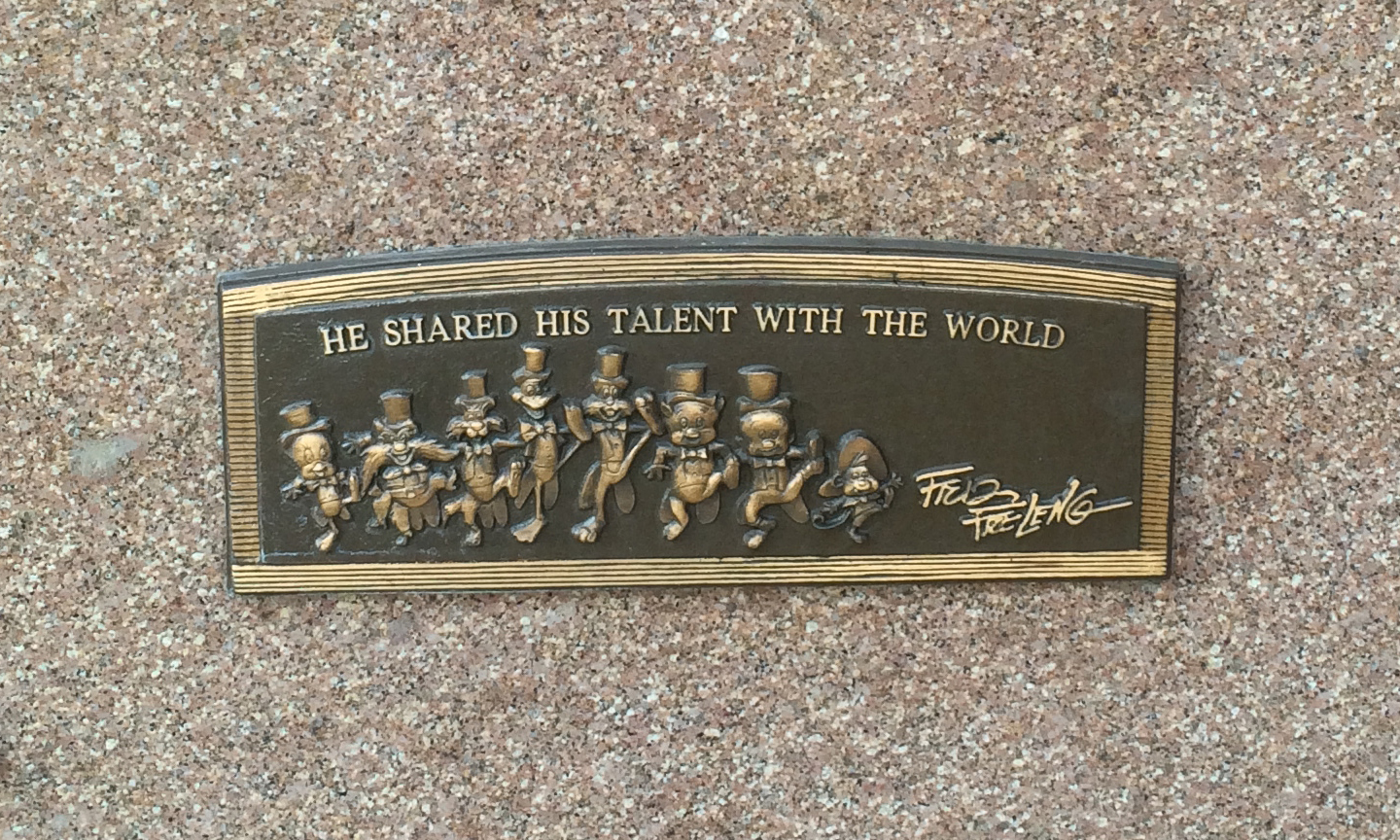
Crypt of Friz Freleng at Hillside Memorial Park, featuring many of the beloved characters he helped create

In 1994, the International Family Film Festival presented its first Lifetime Achievement of Excellence in Animation award to Freleng, and the award has since been referred to as the "Friz Award" in his honor.

On May 26, 1995, Freleng died of natural causes at the UCLA Medical Center, aged 89. The Kids' WB animated TV series The Sylvester & Tweety Mysteries, and the Looney Tunes cartoon From Hare to Eternity (which was the last one directed by Chuck Jones), were both dedicated to his memory. After his death, Cartoon Network aired a variation of one of their station identifications with the words "Friz Freleng: 1906–1995" (the birth year is disputed) appearing and an announcer paying tribute to Freleng and his works. He is interred in Hillside Memorial Park Cemetery.

Freleng is portrayed by Taylor Gray in the film Walt Before Mickey (2015).

== Partial filmography ==
- Alice's Picnic (Short) (animator, 1927)
- Trolley Troubles (Short) (animator, 1927)
- The Banker's Daughter (Short) (director and animator, 1927)
- Rickety Gin (Short) (director and animator, 1927)
- Fiery Fireman (Short) (director and animator, 1928)
- Homeless Homer (Short) (director and animator, 1929)
- Hen Fruit (Short) (director and animator, 1929)
- The Wicked West (Short) (director, 1929)
- Weary Willies (Short) (director, 1929)
- Bosko the Talk-Ink Kid (Short) (animator – uncredited, 1929)
- Sinkin' in the Bathtub (Short) (animator, 1930)
- Hold Anything (Short) (animator, 1930)
- The Booze Hangs High (Short) (animator, 1930)
- Big Man from the North (Short) (animator, 1930)
- Ain't Nature Grand! (Short) (animator, 1930)
- Dumb Patrol (Short) (animator, 1931)
- Bosko's Holiday (Short) (animator, 1931)
- The Tree's Knees (Short) (animator, 1931)
- One More Time (Short) (animator, 1931)
- Smile, Darn Ya, Smile! (Short) (animator, 1931)
- Bosko's Soda Fountain (Short) (animator, 1931)
- You Don't Know What You're Doin'! (Short) (animator, 1931)
- Hittin' the Trail for Hallelujah Land (Short) (animator, 1931)
- Bosko at the Zoo (Short) (animator, 1932)
- Battling Bosko (Short) (animator, 1932)
- Freddy the Freshman (Short) (animator, 1932)
- Big-Hearted Bosko (Short) (animator, 1932)
- Bosko's Party (Short) (animator, 1932)
- Goopy Geer (Short) (animator, 1932)
- It's Got Me Again! (Short) (animator, 1932)
- Moonlight for Two (Short) (animator, 1932)
- The Queen Was in the Parlor (Short) (animator, 1932)
- Bosko at the Beach (Short) (animator, 1932)
- Bosko's Store (Short) (animator, 1932)
- Bosko the Lumberjack (Short) (animator, 1932)
- Ride Him, Bosko! (Short) (animator, 1932)
- Bosko the Drawback (Short) (animator, 1932)
- Bosko's Woodland Daze (Short) (animator, 1932)
- Bosko in Dutch (Short) (director and animator – uncredited, 1933)
- One Step Ahead of My Shadow (Short) (animator, 1933)
- Bosko in Person (Short) (director and animator – uncredited, 1933)
- Bosko the Speed King (Short) (animator, 1933)
- Wake Up the Gypsy in Me (Short) (animator, 1933)
- I Like Mountain Music (Short) (animator, 1933)
- Beau Bosko (Short) (director – uncredited, 1933)
- Shuffle Off to Buffalo (Short) (director – uncredited, 1933)
- Bosko's Mechanical Man (Short) (animator, 1933)
- We're in the Money (Short) (animator, 1933)
- Bosko's Picture Show (Short) (director – uncredited, 1933)
- Buddy's Day Out (Short) (story editor – uncredited, 1933)
- I've Got to Sing a Torch Song (Short) (director – uncredited, 1933)
- Buddy the Gob (Short) (director, 1934)
- Buddy and Towser (Short) (director, 1934)
- Beauty and the Beast (Short) (director, 1934)
- Buddy's Trolley Troubles (Short) (director, 1934)
- Goin' to Heaven on a Mule (Short) (director, 1934)
- How Do I Know It's Sunday (Short) (director, 1934)
- Why Do I Dream Those Dreams (Short) (director, 1934)
- The Girl at the Ironing Board (Short) (director, 1934)
- The Miller's Daughter (Short) (director, 1934)
- Shake Your Powder Puff (Short) (director, 1934)
- Those Beautiful Dames (Short) (director, 1934)
- Pop Goes Your Heart (Short) (director, 1934)
- Mr. and Mrs. Is the Name (Short) (director, 1935)
- Country Boy (Short) (director, 1935)
- I Haven't Got a Hat (Short) (director, 1935)
- Along Flirtation Walk (Short) (director, 1935)
- My Green Fedora (Short) (director, 1935)
- Into Your Dance (Short) (director, 1935)
- The Country Mouse (Short) (director, 1935)
- The Merry Old Soul (Short) (director, 1935)
- The Lady in Red (Short) (director, 1935)
- The Little Dutch Plate (Short) (director, 1935)
- Billboard Frolics (Short) (director, 1935)
- Flowers for Madame (Short) (director, 1935)
- I Wanna Play House (Short) (director, 1936)
- The Cat Came Back (Short) (director, 1936)
- I'm a Big Shot Now (Short) (director, 1936)
- Let It Be Me (Short) (director, 1936)
- Bingo Crosbyana (Short) (director, 1936)
- When I Yoo Hoo (Short) (director, 1936)
- Sunday Go to Meetin' Time (Short) (director, 1936)
- At Your Service Madame (Short) (director, 1936)
- Toy Town Hall (Short) (director, 1936)
- Boulevardier from the Bronx (Short) (director, 1936)
- The CooCoo Nut Grove (Short) (director, 1936)
- He Was Her Man (Short) (director, 1937)
- Pigs Is Pigs (Short) (director, 1937)
- The Fella with the Fiddle (Short) (director, 1937)
- She Was an Acrobat's Daughter (Short) (director, 1937)
- Clean Pastures (Short) (director, 1937)
- Streamlined Greta Green (Short) (director, 1937)
- Sweet Sioux (Short) (director, 1937)
- Plenty of Money and You (Short) (director, 1937)
- Dog Daze (Short) (director, 1937)
- The Lyin' Mouse (Short) (director, 1937)
- September in the Rain (Short) (director, 1937)
- My Little Buckaroo (Short) (director, 1938)
- Jungle Jitters (Short) (director, 1938)
- A Star Is Hatched (Short) (director, 1938)
- Poultry Pirates (Short) (director, 1938)
- A Day at the Beach (Short) (director, 1938)
- The Pygmy Hunt (Short) (director, 1938)
- Honduras Hurricane (Short) (director – uncredited, 1938)
- Petunia Natural Park (Short) (director – uncredited, 1938)
- The Captain's Christmas (Short) (director – uncredited, 1938)
- Seal Skinners (Short) (director – uncredited, 1939)
- Mama's New Hat (Short) (director – uncredited, 1939)
- The Bookworm (Short) (director – uncredited, 1939)
- The Mad Maestro (Short) (director – uncredited, 1939)
- Confederate Honey (Short) (director, 1940)
- The Hardship of Miles Standish (Short) (director, 1940)
- You Ought to Be in Pictures (Short) (director, 1940)
- Little Blabbermouse (Short) (director, 1940)
- Porky's Baseball Broadcast (Short) (director, 1940)
- Malibu Beach Party (Short) (director, 1940)
- Calling Dr. Porky (Short) (director, 1940)
- Porky's Hired Hand (Short) (director, 1940)
- Shop Look & Listen (Short) (director, 1940)
- The Fighting 69½th (Short) (director, 1941)
- The Cat's Tale (Short) (director, 1941)
- Porky's Bear Facts (Short) (director, 1941)
- The Trial of Mr. Wolf (Short) (director, 1941)
- Hiawatha's Rabbit Hunt (Short) (director, 1941)
- The Wacky Worm (Short) (director, 1941)
- Sport Chumpions (Short) (director, 1941)
- Notes to You (Short) (director, 1941)
- Rookie Revue (Short) (director, 1941)
- Rhapsody in Rivets (Short) (director, 1941)
- Hop, Skip and a Chump (Short) (director, 1942)
- Porky's Pastry Pirates (Short) (director, 1942)
- The Wabbit Who Came to Supper (Short) (director, 1942)
- Saps in Chaps (Short) (director, 1942)
- Lights Fantastic (Short) (director, 1942)
- Double Chaser (Short) (director, 1942)
- Foney Fables (Short) (director, 1942)
- Fresh Hare (Short) (director, 1942)
- The Sheepish Wolf (Short) (director, 1942)
- The Hare-Brained Hypnotist (Short) (director, 1942)
- Ding Dog Daddy (Short) (director, 1942)
- Pigs in a Polka (Short) (director, 1943)
- The Fifth-Column Mouse (Short) (director, 1943)
- Greetings Bait (Short) (director, 1943)
- Jack-Wabbit and the Beanstalk (Short) (director, 1943)
- Yankee Doodle Daffy (Short) (director, 1943)
- Gripes (Short) (director, 1943)
- Hiss and Make Up (Short) (director, 1943)
- Daffy – The Commando (Short) (director, 1943)
- Rumors (Short) (director, 1943)
- Little Red Riding Rabbit (Short) (director, 1944)
- Meatless Flyday (Short) (director, 1944)
- Snafuperman (Short) (director, 1944)
- Bugs Bunny Nips the Nips (Short) (director, 1944)
- Duck Soup to Nuts (Short) (director, 1944)
- Slightly Daffy (Short) (director, 1944)
- The Chow Hound (Short) (director, 1944)
- Hare Force (Short) (director, 1944)
- Goldilocks and the Jivin' Bears (Short) (director, 1944)
- Pay Day (Short) (director, 1944)
- Three Brothers (Short) (director, 1944)
- Stage Door Cartoon (Short) (director, 1944)
- Herr Meets Hare (Short) (director, 1945)
- Life with Feathers (Short) (director, 1945)
- Hare Trigger (Short) (director, 1945)
- Ain't That Ducky (Short) (director, 1945)
- Hot Spot (Short) (director, 1945)
- Peck Up Your Troubles (Short) (director, 1945)
- Operation Snafu (Short) (director, 1945)
- Baseball Bugs (Short) (director, 1946)
- Holiday for Shoestrings (Short) (director, 1946)
- Of Thee I Sting (Short) (director, 1946)
- Racketeer Rabbit (Short) (director, 1946)
- Rhapsody Rabbit (Short) (director, 1946)
- The Gay Anties (Short) (director, 1947)
- A Hare Grows in Manhattan (Short) (director, 1947)
- Tweetie Pie (Short) (director, 1947)
- Rabbit Transit (Short) (director, 1947)
- Along Came Daffy (Short) (director, 1947)
- Slick Hare (Short) (director, 1947)
- Back Alley Oproar (Short) (director, 1948)
- I Taw a Putty Tat (Short) (director, 1948)
- Buccaneer Bunny (Short) (director, 1948)
- Bugs Bunny Rides Again (Short) (director, 1948)
- Hare Splitter (Short) (director, 1948)
- Kit for Cat (Short) (director, 1948)
- Wise Quackers (Short) (director, 1949)
- Hare Do (Short) (director, 1949)
- High Diving Hare (Short) (director, 1949)
- Curtain Razor (Short) (director, 1949)
- Mouse Mazurka (Short) (director, 1949)
- Knights Must Fall (Short) (director, 1949)
- Bad Ol' Putty Tat (Short) (director, 1949)
- Dough for the Do-Do (Short) (director, 1949)
- Each Dawn I Crow (Short) (director, 1949)
- Which Is Witch (Short) (director, 1949)
- Knighty Knight Bugs (Short) (director, 1958, earned John W. Burton's Academy Award for Best Animated Short Film after his death)
- Shishkabugs (Short) (director, 1962)
- The Jet Cage (Short) (writer, 1962)
- Philbert (Three's a Crowd) (Short) (animation director, 1963)
- Nuts and Volts (Short) (director, 1964)
- The Pink Phink (Short) (director, 1964, earned Freleng his only Academy Award for Best Animated Short Film)
- It's Nice to Have a Mouse Around the House (Short) (director and producer, 1965)
- The Wild Chase (Short) (director and producer, 1965)
- Tease for Two (Short) (producer, 1965)
- Cats and Bruises (Short) (director and producer, 1965)
- Shot and Bothered (Short) (producer, 1966)
- The Solid Tin Coyote (Short) (producer, 1966)
- Pink Is a Many Splintered Thing (Short) (producer, 1968)
- Slink Pink (Short) (producer, 1969)
- The Ant and the Aardvark (Short) (producer, 1969)
- Therapeutic Pink (Short) (producer, 1977)
- Pink Press (Short) (producer, 1978)
- Pinktails for Two (Short) (producer, 1978)
- Bugs Bunny's Looney Christmas Tales (TV Short) (director of "Bugs Bunny" sequences, 1979)
