= When I Yoo Hoo =

1936 film by Isadore Freleng

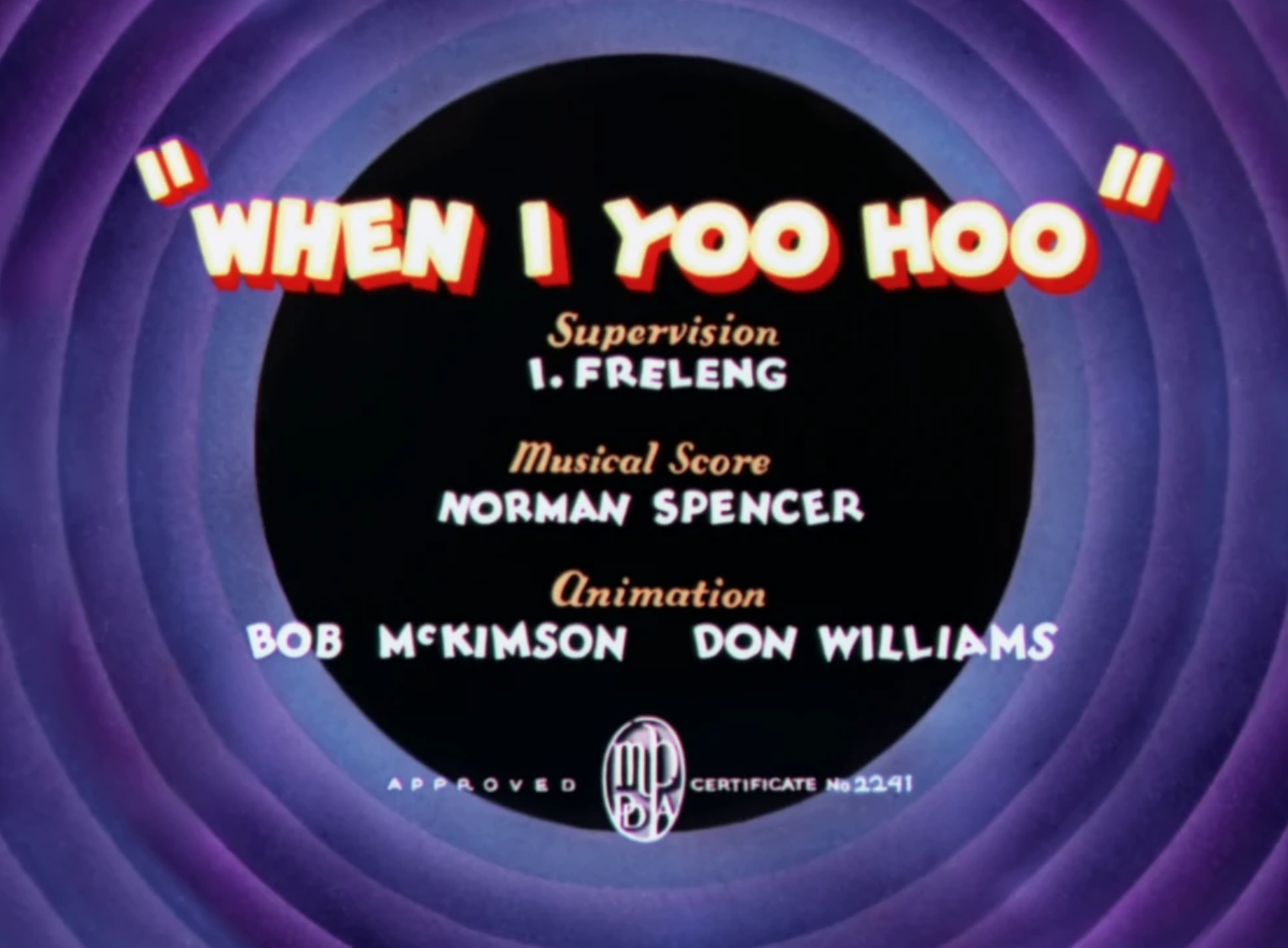
- Original title card
- Directed by: Isadore Freleng
- Produced by: Leon Schlesinger
- Music by: Norman Spencer
- Animation by: Bob McKimson; Don Williams
- Color process: Technicolor
- Production company: Leon Schlesinger Productions
- Distributed by: Warner Bros. Productions; The Vitaphone Corporation
- Release date: June 27, 1936
- Running time: 7 min
- Country: United States
- Language: English

When I Yoo Hoo is a 1936 American animated comedy short film directed by Isadore Freleng. The short was released on June 27, 1936. It is the 60th film in the Merrie Melodies series. It was re-released as a "Blue Ribbon" reissue in 1945.

== Plot ==
Two rival hillbilly families, the Weavers and the Matthews, live across from each other in a valley. While the Weavers play music, the Matthews wake up and decide to shoot the Weavers. One Matthew shoots with his feet, the rifle drooping after each shot. One Weaver's fur hat yelps like a live animal after being shot.

The county's sheriff, J. Botz, drives to the valley to pin a notice, notifying that the Weavers and Matthews must settle their feud with a cockfight, with the loser leaving the valley for good measure. Both sides attempt to surrender to each other, but the notice ironically reinvigorates their rivalry. During the fight, the roosters appear to be on equal footing, twisting their necks with each other's before repeating each other's moves. The Matthews' rooster appears to be losing, but he spots a Matthew drinking moonshine and drinks it instead, gaining strength to beat up the Weavers' rooster. He knocks the Weaver's rooster out, only to be hit multiple times through the recoil and is also knocked out. The sheriff declares the Matthews to be the winner, then also declares the Weavers to be the winner when he spots it unconscious, before declaring it to be a draw. Angered that the sheriff had wasted their time, the two families beat up the sheriff while their roosters watch excitedly.
