= Pop Goes Your Heart =

1934 film by Isadore Freleng

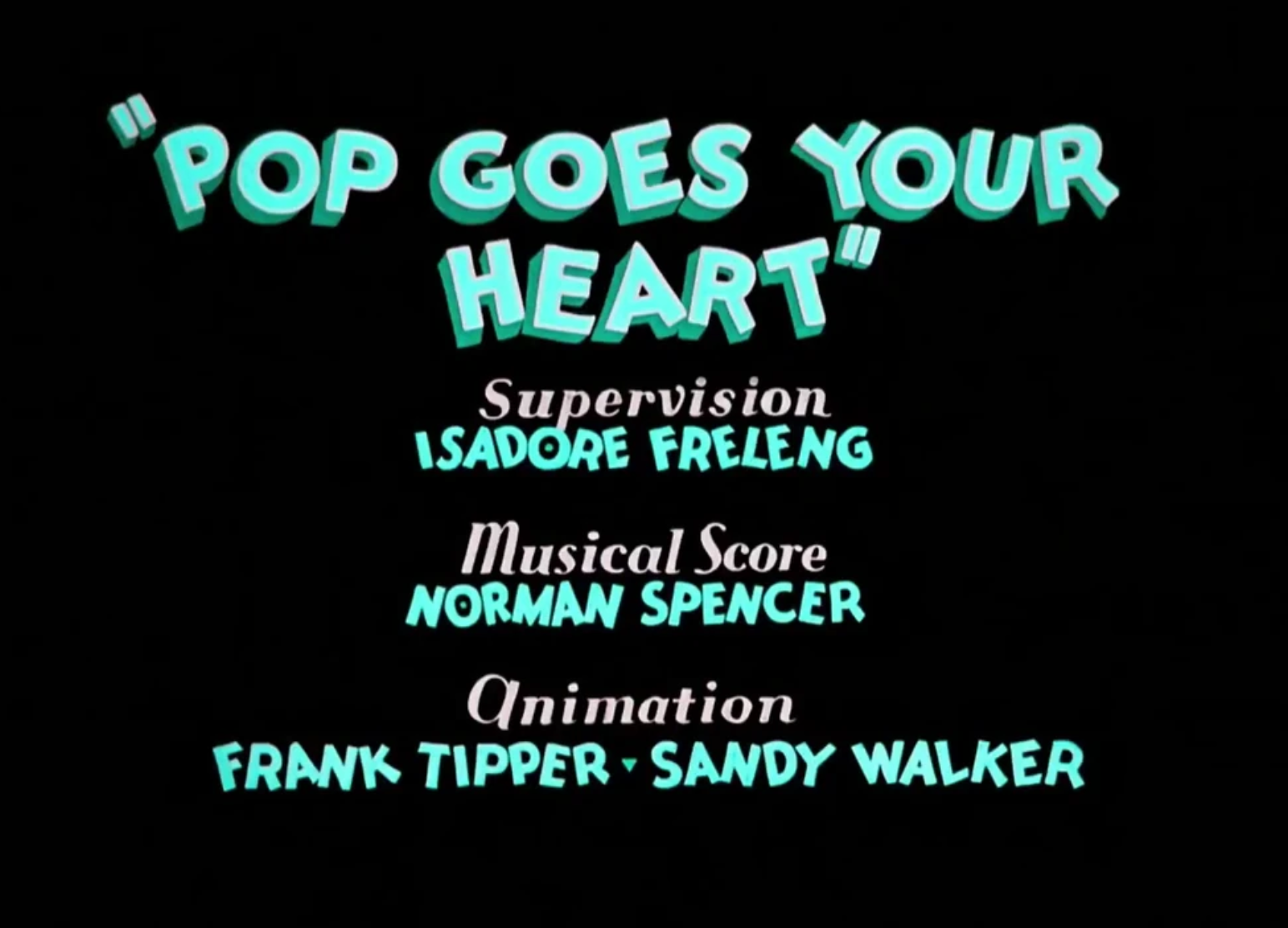
- Title card
- Directed by: Isadore Freleng
- Produced by: Leon Schlesinger
- Music by: Norman Spencer
- Animation by: Frank Tipper; Sandy Walker
- Color process: Technicolor
- Production company: Leon Schlesinger Productions
- Distributed by: Warner Bros. Productions; The Vitaphone Corporation
- Release date: December 8, 1934
- Running time: 7 min
- Country: United States
- Language: English

Pop Goes Your Heart is a 1934 American animated comedy short film directed by Isadore Freleng. The short was released on December 8, 1934. It is the 42nd film in the Merrie Melodies series, featuring the titular song from the film Happiness Ahead.

== Plot ==
A bird chirps to mark the coming of spring, while hummingbirds and bees pollinate flowers. A grasshopper teaches its offspring to spit tobacco, only for the first child to fail. Three small turtles row with their shells as boats and reeds as paddles. Spiders play a spiderweb like a harp on an apple tree while two apples fall and dance with worms that come out from holes. A swan eats a fish, only to be comically devoured by a larger fish. Three frogs sing and dance to the titular song.

A young bird finds an apple with a worm nearby, attempting to eat it only to be spanked by the worm. Beavers build dams while two beavers play tennis with their tails. A bear struggles to roar and moisturizes its throat to roar. It attempts to eat a turtle, only for the turtle to switch the places of its head and tails and bite the bear's nose. Terrified, it switches his focus to some beavers, who lure it into a tree hole, smack its buttocks and drop a beehive on it. The bear is chased by the angry bees and slides down a fenced grassy slope into a machine that produces hay bales, to the confusion of the farmer. Humiliated, the bear runs away.
