= The Queen Was in the Parlor =

1932 film by Rudolf Ising

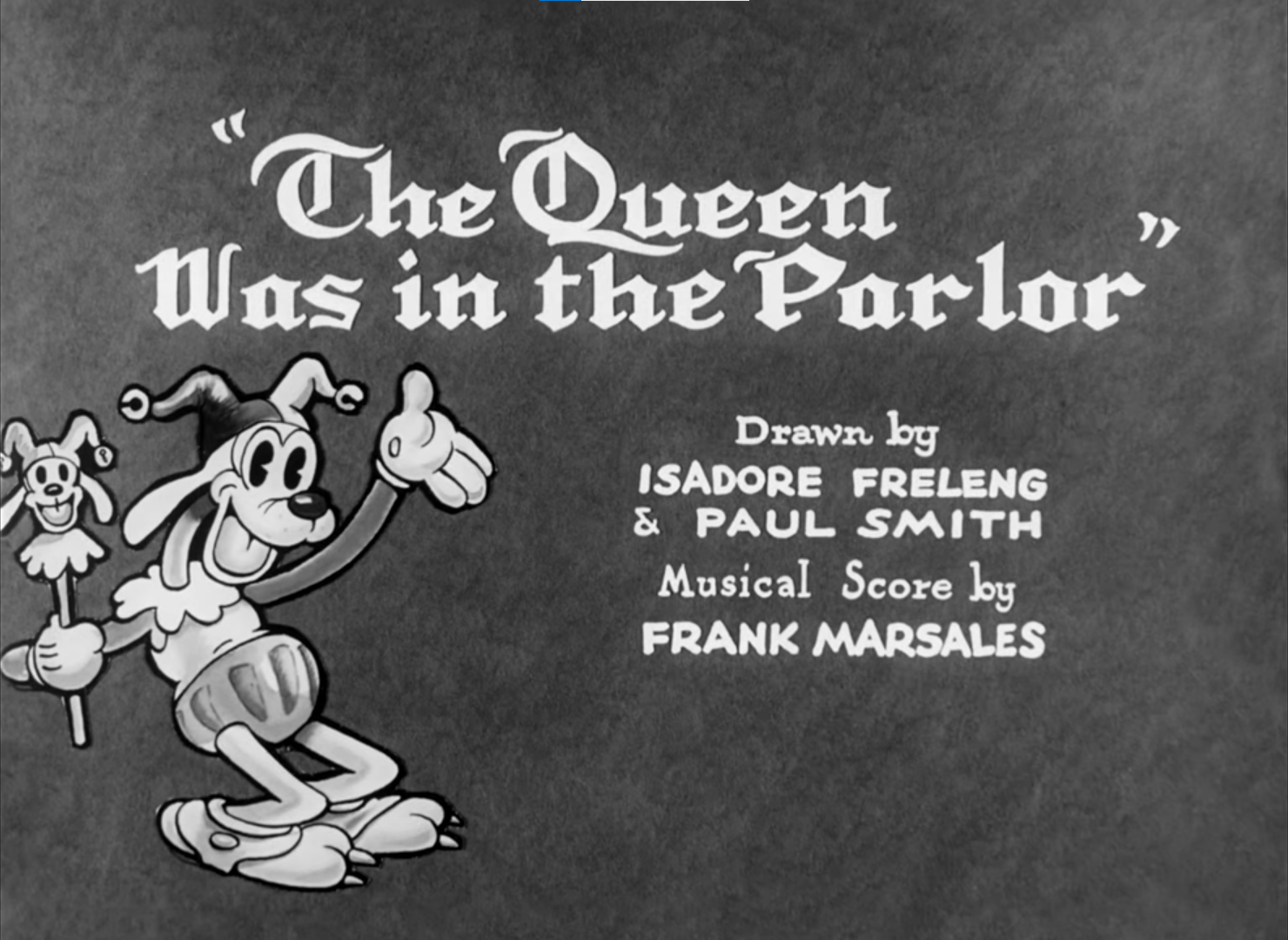
- Title card
- Directed by: Rudolf Ising
- Produced by: Hugh Harman; Rudolf Ising; Leon Schlesinger
- Music by: Frank Marsales
- Animation by: Isadore Freleng; Paul Smith
- Production companies: Harman-Ising Productions; Leon Schlesinger Productions
- Distributed by: Warner Bros. Pictures; The Vitaphone Corporation
- Release date: July 2, 1932
- Running time: 7 min
- Country: United States
- Language: English

The Queen Was in the Parlor is a 1932 American animated comedy short film directed by Rudolf Ising. It is the thirteenth film in the Merrie Melodies series, featuring the titular song by Harold Arlen. The short was released on June 11, 1932, and is the final cartoon to star Goopy Geer, one of the few recurring characters in the early Merrie Melodies series.

== Plot ==
Full short in restored form

A hippo king returns to his castle on a donkey. He returns to find the queen absent and demands explanations as the titular song is performed by knights and other citizens. Meanwhile, Goopy Geer comes out of his doghouse and removes fleas from his armor. The princess repairs a set of armor.

As the king returns to his throne, Goopy Geer wears his jester outfit to please him. He performs a ventriloquist act with a hand puppet of himself, only for a jack-in-the-box caricature of Rudy Vallée to offend the king. He walks to the entrance to find an eavesdropper, then proceeds to dance across the room. Meanwhile, a cat chases a mouse, who enters its mousehole and returns in full armor, throwing the lance at the cat as it escapes.

A Black Knight enters and spits on the armor the princess repaired, causing it to explode and reduced to scrap metal. He then spots the princess and abducts her. Goopy Geer notices the commotion and leaves to fight the knight. He wields a halberd while fighting the knight, who wields a giant sword, but is accidentally sent flying off a pole. He lands into a cupboard and returns with a makeshift set of armor made of kitchen equipment. It does not last as the knight sends him tumbling onto another pole, on which a ram's head is placed and falls onto Goopy's head. Goopy then rams the knight, shattering his armor and revealing his lanky appearance. Humiliated, the knight recovers his armor by shaking it in a container and leaves hurriedly, while Goopy Geer mocks him, still wearing the ram's head.

== Reception ==
The Film Daily noted that "action and musical work are okay". The Motion Picture Herald called it "clever in idea and amusing in execution".
