= Country Boy (1935 film) =

1935 film by Isadore Freleng

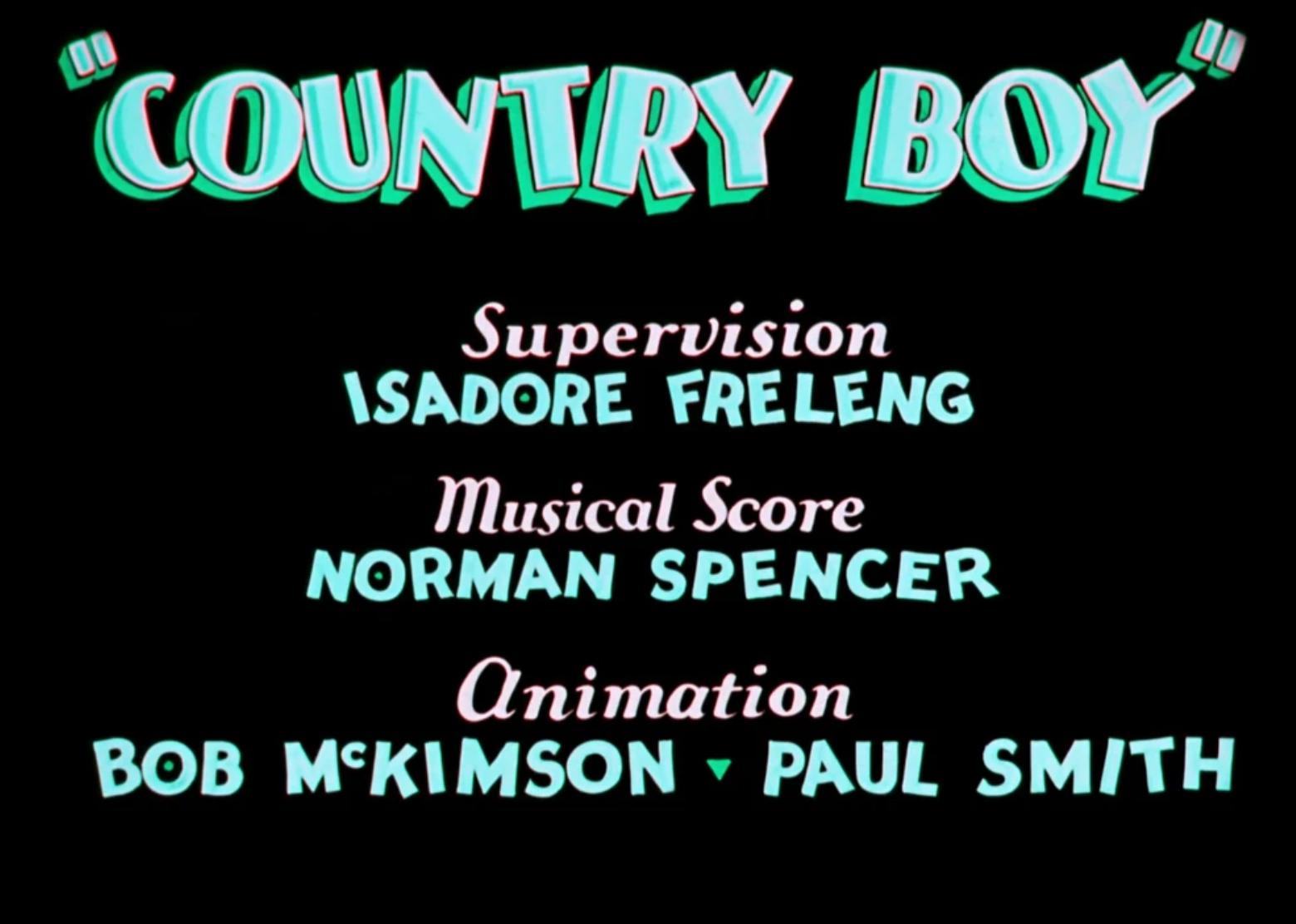
- Title card
- Directed by: Isadore Freleng
- Produced by: Leon Schlesinger
- Music by: Norman Spencer
- Animation by: Bob McKimson; Paul Smith
- Color process: Technicolor
- Production company: Leon Schlesinger Productions
- Distributed by: Warner Bros. Productions; The Vitaphone Corporation
- Release date: February 9, 1935
- Running time: 7 min
- Country: United States
- Language: English

Country Boy is a 1935 American animated comedy short film directed by Isadore Freleng. The short was released on February 9, 1935. It is the 44th film in the Merrie Melodies series. It is a parody of The Tale of Peter Rabbit.

== Plot ==
An anthropomorphic rabbit bids goodbye to her children as they go to school, only for one of her children, Peter Rabbit, to tie the clothes of two of his other siblings together as a joke. She loses Peter at the last minute and finds him in disguise amongst hens in a failed attempt of truancy. Peter kicks a can and stubs his toe, only to find a large farm with a myriad of vegetables. He tries to enter but is stopped by his siblings, who threaten to tell on him and claim he will be beaten to a pulp inside. As the school bell rings, Peter's siblings rush to school, so he exploits this to immediately turn back at the school entrance and enters the farm.

Peter feasts on carrots, which humorously have skeletons. He then eats beans which he extracts from their pods with a dagger, only to realize they are Mexican jumping beans, which cause him to hop a short distance. He tries to extract a beetroot to no avail, so he ties it to a well, revealing that all beetroots are interconnected, including a cow who attempts to feast on the beetroots, only to fall into the well. The farmer notices him and chases him, so he rides a lawn mower to evade him. To the farmer's horror, the lawn mower's movement is so erratic it destroys all nearby flowers, bushes and crops. Peter is then hit with maple syrup multiple times, crashing into a chicken coop where he is plastered with feathers. Amused by this and trying to disguise himself again, he crows like a rooster.

== Home media ==
This short is available on disc 1 of the Looney Tunes Collector's Vault: Volume 2 Blu-ray set.
