= Into Your Dance =

1935 film by Isadore Freleng

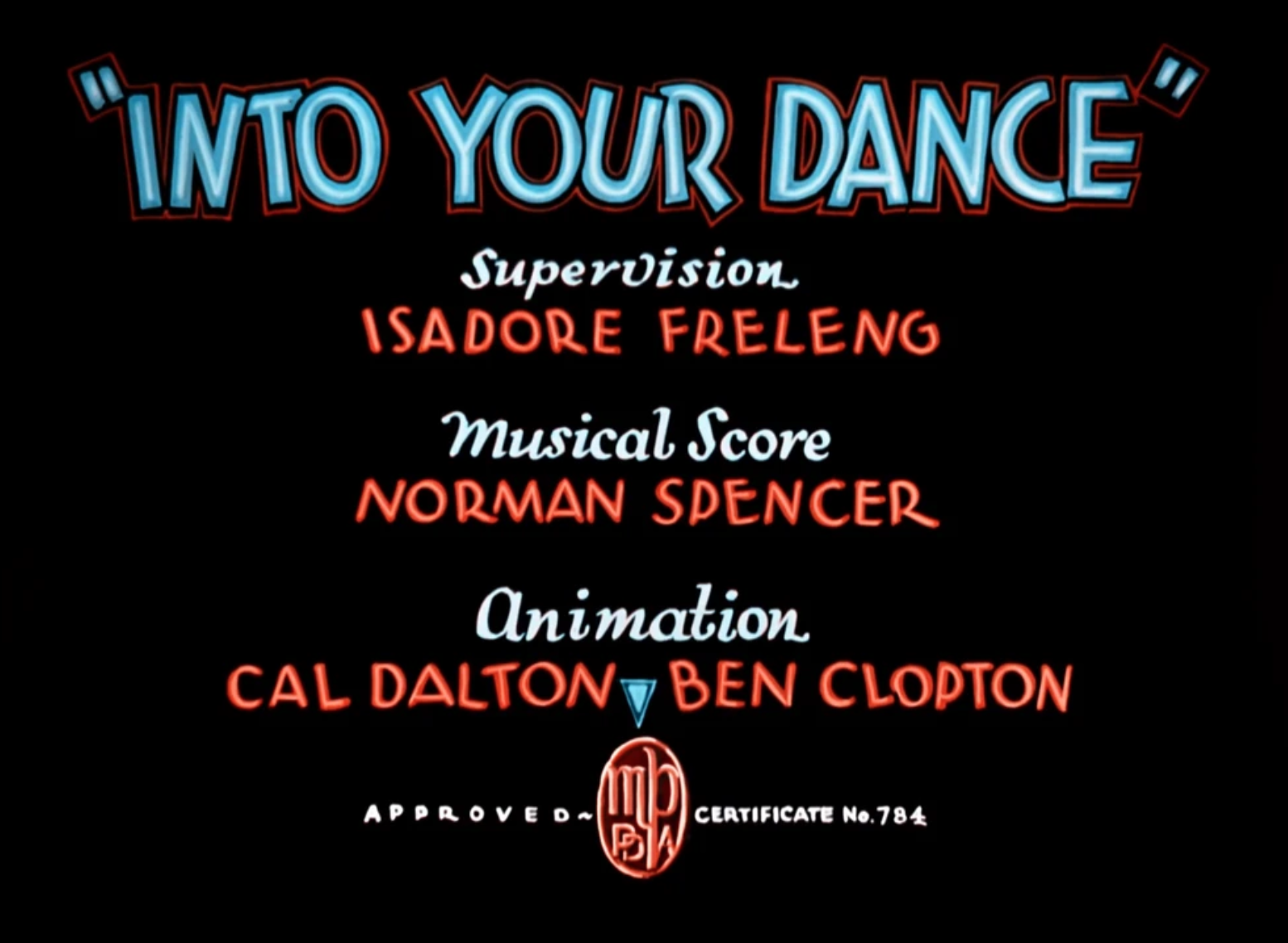
- Title card
- Directed by: Isadore Freleng
- Produced by: Leon Schlesinger
- Music by: Norman Spencer
- Animation by: Cal Dalton; Ben Clopton
- Color process: Technicolor
- Production company: Leon Schlesinger Productions
- Distributed by: Warner Bros. Productions; The Vitaphone Corporation
- Release date: June 8, 1935
- Running time: 7 min
- Country: United States
- Language: English

Into Your Dance is a 1935 American animated comedy short film directed by Isadore Freleng. The short was released on June 8, 1935. It is the 48th film in the Merrie Melodies series.

== Plot ==
Captain Benny operates a show boat, which somehow passes through elevated land at a river with no issue. A barbershop quartet in blackface sings a tune while crowds pour into the boat.

Benny introduces the world's "most famous conductor", a pig who is thought to be an imposter, booed and pelted with tomatoes twice, but nevertheless dons a disguise that earns cheers from the crowd. He conducts "William Tell Overture" with infrequent interruptions such as hitting a musician with a mallet. An old dog musician is disillusioned and electrocutes the pig's tail, causing him to conduct at an extremely fast speed. A turtle percussionist tries his best to keep up and rests, only to barely keep up with the final drum roll. The pig is then hit on the head while applause is given.

Benny introduces the second event, "Amateur Night", where a group of amateur musicians attempt to impress the audience. The first musician, a female cow soprano singer, is thrown out after Benny could hardly tolerate her singing. A burly individual recites poetry with practical special effects, but is goaded into fighting by a bell ring and knocked out. The next performer, a lanky dog, distracts Benny and steals the bell in an attempt to avoid being thrown out. His terrible singing causes everyone to boo and swiftly leave, while Benny is forced to endure the entirety of his performance due to the bell being missing. The dog is confused by the empty stage, only to be chased off the ship by Benny with a plank.
