= At Your Service Madame =

1936 film by Isadore Freleng

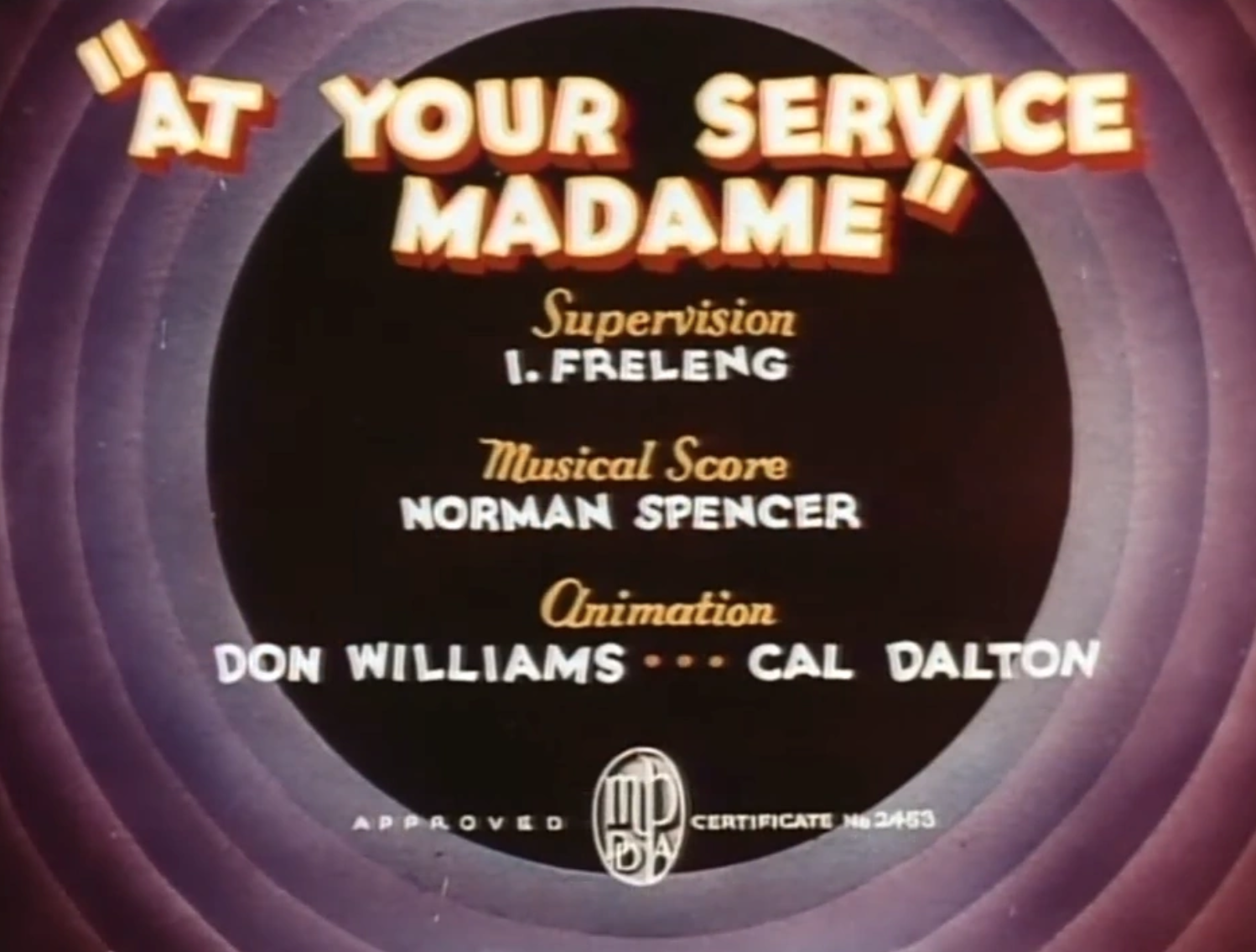
- Title card
- Directed by: Isadore Freleng
- Produced by: Leon Schlesinger
- Starring: Tedd Pierce; Martha Wentworth
- Music by: Norman Spencer
- Animation by: Don Williams; Cal Dalton
- Color process: Technicolor
- Production company: Leon Schlesinger Productions
- Distributed by: Warner Bros. Productions; The Vitaphone Corporation
- Release date: August 29, 1936
- Running time: 7 minutes
- Country: United States
- Language: English

At Your Service Madame is a 1936 American animated comedy short film directed by Isadore Freleng. The short was released on August 29, 1936. It is the 63rd film in the Merrie Melodies series. It is the final film in the series to be scored by Norman Spencer, who retired and was replaced by Carl W. Stalling. The protagonist, Piggy Hamhock, would appear the following year in Pigs Is Pigs, while the antagonist, W. C. Squeals, would appear in two more cartoons.

== Plot ==
Mrs. Hamhock, a widowed pig, prepares breakfast for her children, including Piggy, who arrives first due to his huge appetite. He attempts to eat first, then eats too quickly to the chagrin of his mother. W. C. Squeals, a con man who is a caricature of W. C. Fields, walks to Hamhock's house and finds a newspaper describing her as having won a huge inheritance from her late husband, which he is fixated on.

Squeals attempts to win her favor by visiting while plucking the flowers from her pots to feign genuine feelings. He notices the family safe while flirting with her, so he goads Mrs. Hamhock into playing the piano while he sings and opens the nearby safe. Unfortunately, Piggy runs out of his room and spots him. Squeals kicks him into the goldfish bowl, where Piggy accidentally eats the goldfish while being stuck in the bowl. As he easily opens the safe and steals money, Piggy notifies his siblings, who conspire and build traps to subdue Squeals. Piggy electrocutes Squeals and is scolded by his mother, only for his siblings to hook Squeals through his back, drag him through stairs, the carpet, and eventually swinging in the air as his nose repeatedly sticks on and unsticks from the wall. Piggy strangles Squeals with a window while his siblings fashion a device out of a belt and destroyed fan, which shakes the stolen money out of Squeals' pocket and throws him out. Humiliated, Squeals leaves while trembling in fear.
