= Along Flirtation Walk =

1935 film by Isadore Freleng

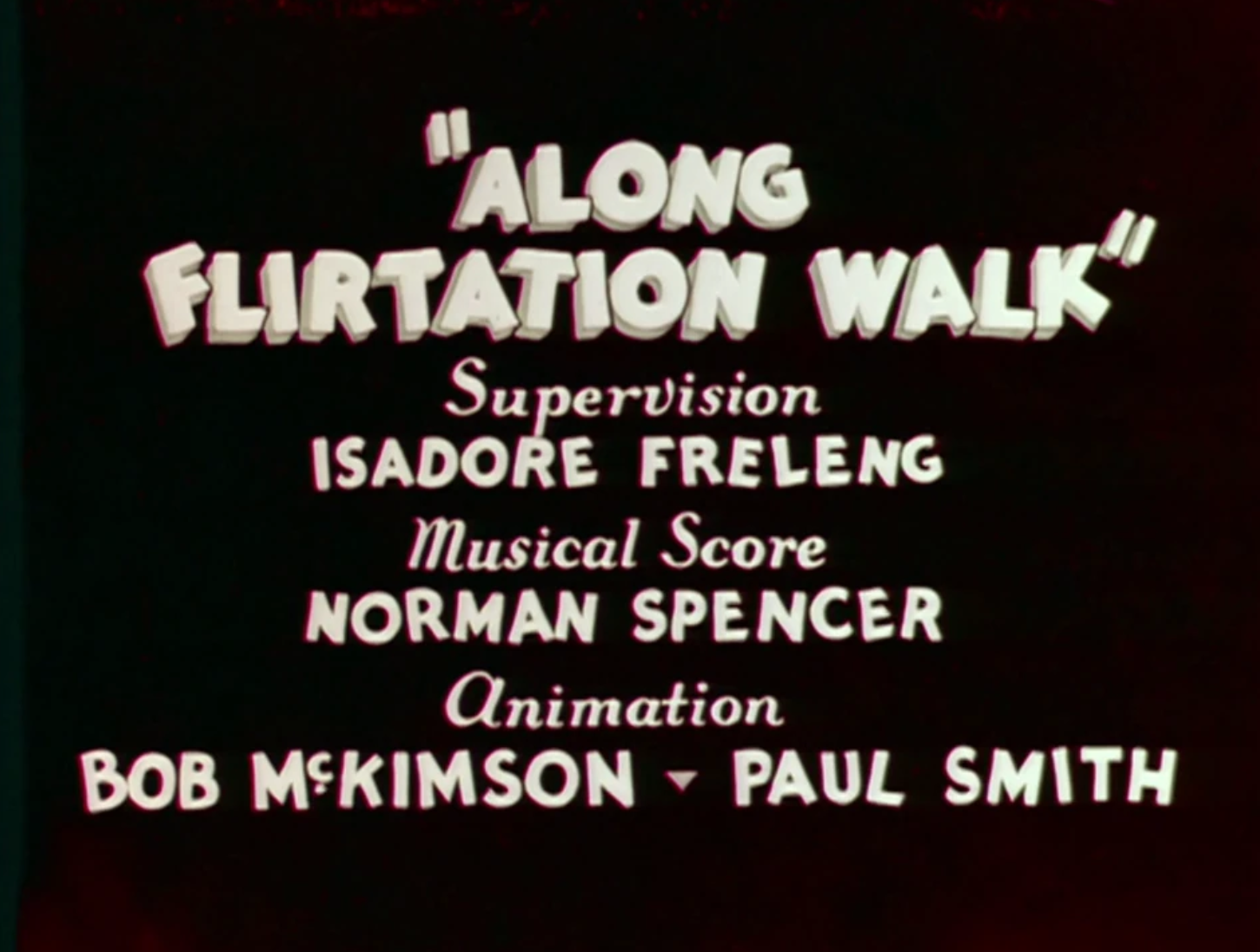
- Title card
- Directed by: Isadore Freleng
- Produced by: Leon Schlesinger
- Music by: Norman Spencer
- Animation by: Bob McKimson; Paul Smith
- Color process: Technicolor
- Production company: Leon Schlesinger Productions
- Distributed by: Warner Bros. Productions; The Vitaphone Corporation
- Release date: April 6, 1935
- Running time: 7 min
- Country: United States
- Language: English

Along Flirtation Walk is a 1935 animated comedy short film directed by Isadore Freleng. It was released on April 6, 1935. It is the 46th film in the Merrie Melodies series.

The film's extremely risqué nature meant the only print in circulation is a faded 35 mm Associated Artists Productions television print of such low quality it has only been released as part of The Golden Age of Looney Tunes LaserDisc collection.

== Plot ==
At Plymouth Rock College, animal students dance in their dormitory while music is being played. Four ducks from the college's glee club sing the titular song. A single chicken sorrowfully looks at a turkey and duck couple out of jealousy.

Later, an egg-laying match between Plymouth Rock College and Rhode Island Red University occurs on Plymouth Rock College's football field. The teams are scored based on the amount of eggs laid by hens on each team; the competitors and coaches take it extremely seriously. Plymouth Rock College's hens lose by the first half and are lectured by their duck coach in an extremely aggressive way, while Rhode Island Red University's hens are confidently fed billiard balls in an attempt to boost their scores.

In the second half, one hen on Plymouth's side is penalized for having fertilized eggs that hatch chicks. A black hen wants to compete instead of being benched, which the duck coach refuses to allow until the final quarter reveals their team to be 58 points behind. The black hen immediately lays 59 eggs, while the opposing team lays 2 eggs and are exhausted. Two teammates use mallets to force the black hen to lay 2 more eggs, allowing them to win the match. The black hen is celebrated as the team's most valuable player.
