= Those Beautiful Dames =

1934 film by Isadore Freleng

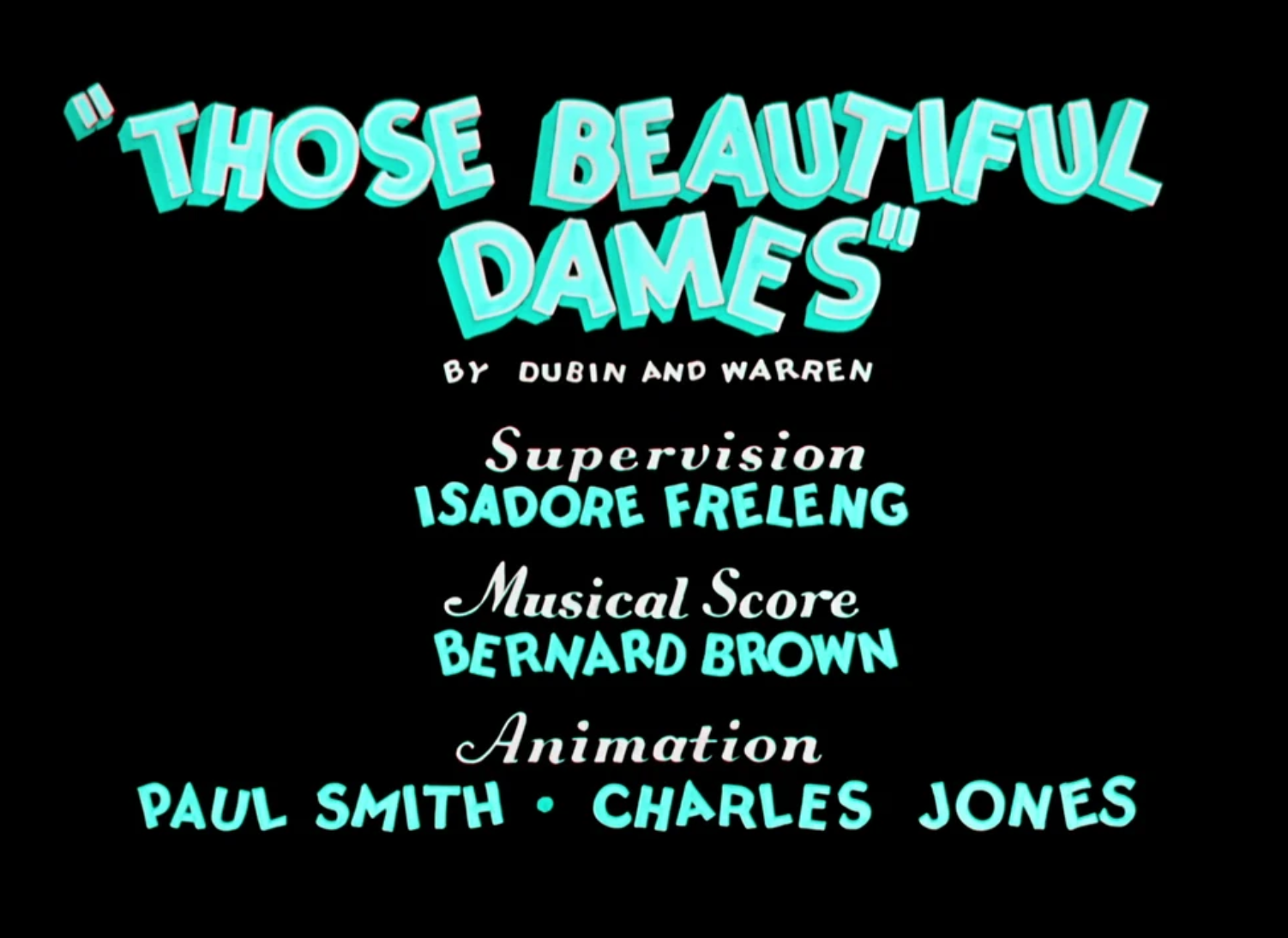
- Title card
- Directed by: Isadore Freleng
- Produced by: Leon Schlesinger
- Music by: Bernard Brown
- Animation by: Paul Smith; Charles Jones
- Color process: Technicolor
- Production company: Leon Schlesinger Productions
- Distributed by: Warner Bros. Productions; The Vitaphone Corporation
- Release date: November 10, 1934
- Running time: 7 min
- Country: United States
- Language: English

Those Beautiful Dames is a 1934 American animated comedy short film directed by Isadore Freleng. The short was released on October 20, 1934. It is the 41st film in the Merrie Melodies series, featuring the titular song from the film Dames, and the first to be produced by 2-strip Technicolor; starting with this film, the Merrie Melodies were designated as the studio's color series, while Looney Tunes would be exclusively produced in black-and-white until 1943.

== Plot ==
One winter, a poor orphan girl walks by a toy store, but laments being unable to afford any toys while she returns home. She tries to start a large fire at the stove, but accidentally extinguishes the tiny flame, so she falls asleep in the cold. Toys somehow find their way to her house and sneakily renovate it until midnight.

At midnight, the girl is waken up and overjoyed to find the toys singing the titular song and dancing. While performances are underway, a toy eats cake meant for the girl, only to be scolded by a doll. The girl plays a record and dances to it. She is even more overjoyed when she finds that the toys prepare meals of ice cream and cake to eat together. The girl is amused when a jester emerges from the ice cream, even if she does not get to eat any.
