= Buddy and Towser =

1934 film by Isadore Freleng

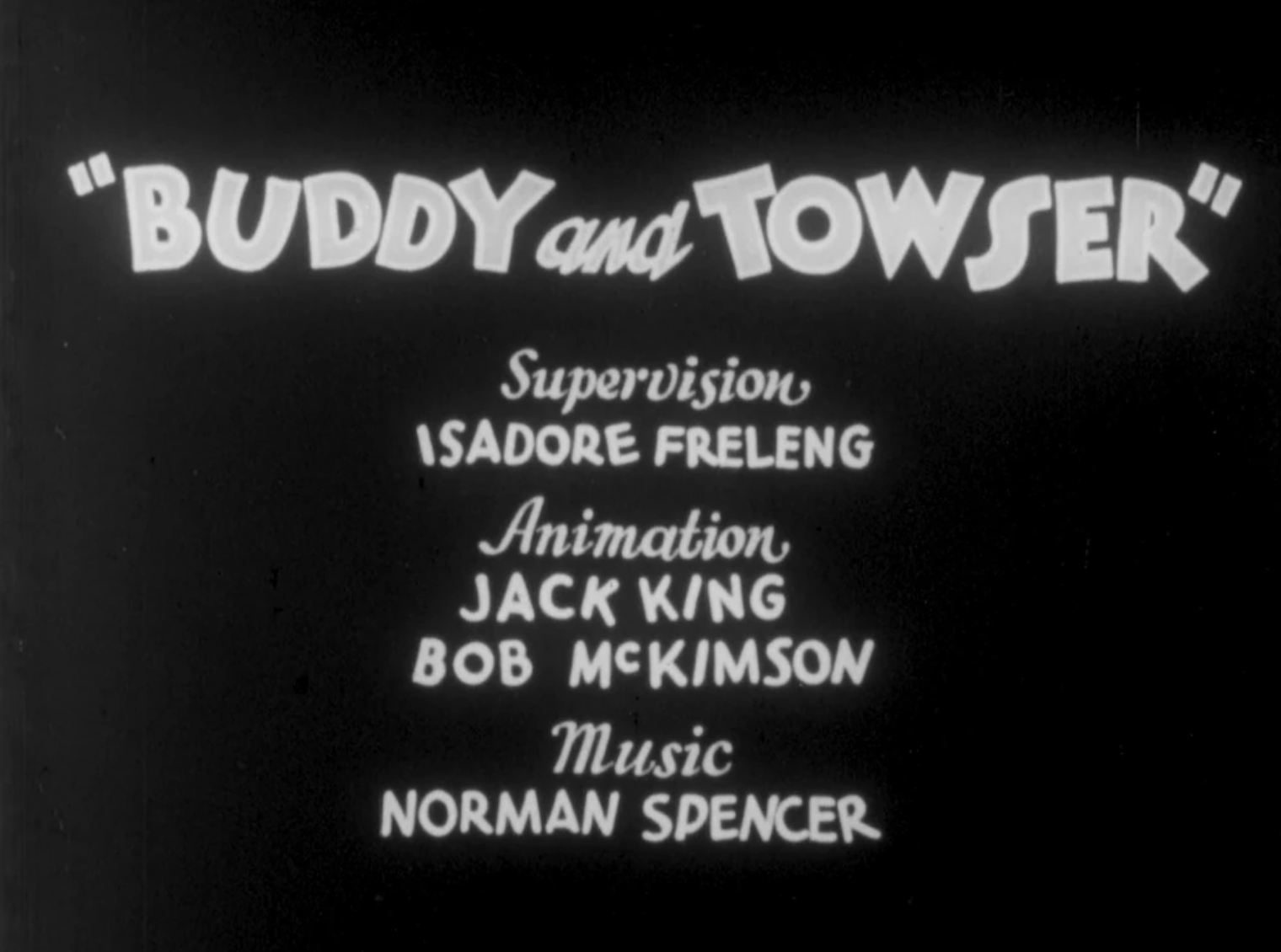
- Title card
- Directed by: Isadore Freleng
- Produced by: Leon Schlesinger
- Starring: Bernard Brown
- Music by: Norman Spencer
- Animation by: Jack King; Bob McKimson
- Color process: Black-and-white
- Production company: Leon Schlesinger Productions
- Distributed by: Warner Bros. Pictures; The Vitaphone Corporation
- Release date: February 24, 1934
- Running time: 7 minutes
- Country: United States
- Language: English

Buddy and Towser is a 1934 American animated comedy short film directed by Isadore Freleng. The cartoon was released on February 24, 1934. It is the 43rd film in the Looney Tunes series and the fifth cartoon to feature Buddy.

== Plot ==
Buddy enlists his dog, Towser, to guard his award-winning chickens, who try to sleep while tolerating each other's shenanigans. A fox penetrates Buddy's property as Towser and Buddy sleep, but fails to catch any chickens, who are able to repel the fox by throwing their eggs at it. In its escape, the fox awakens Towser, who chases the fox mindlessly to the point it simply sit on the doghouse to mock his foolishness, but Buddy is nevertheless notified on time and chases it with a shotgun in hand.

Buddy and Towser search for clues, only to find a bear which somehow multiplies every time Buddy shoots him. They run into a cave and emerge quickly, locking the bears inside with a zipper, before they are hit by icicles launched by the fox. Buddy's shotgun misfires while he gives chase. The fox scurries into a tree hole and watches on top as Buddy's bullets enter a convolutedly shaped hollow branch and hit Towser. The fox hits a tree and rolls down a steep slope, becoming a large snowball which alternates between behind and in front of Buddy before ultimately rolling over him and Towser. The snowball splits into three through a fence and crashes into Buddy's house, incapacitating them. The fox returns to consciousness early enough to dodge the duo's hits, causing them to knock out each other while it escapes.
