= The Country Mouse =

1935 film by Isadore Freleng

- Directed by: Isadore Freleng
- Produced by: Leon Schlesinger
- Starring: Tedd Pierce
- Music by: Bernard Brown
- Animation by: Don Williams; Jack Carr
- Color process: Technicolor
- Production company: Leon Schlesinger Productions
- Distributed by: Warner Bros. Productions; The Vitaphone Corporation
- Release date: July 13, 1935
- Running time: 7 minutes
- Country: United States
- Language: English

The Country Mouse is a 1935 American animated comedy short film directed by Isadore Freleng. The short was released on July 13, 1935. It is the 49th film in the Merrie Melodies series and the oldest Warner Bros. cartoon to be re-released as a "Blue Ribbon" reissue; it was reissued in 1953 as Country Mouse, rendering the original film and credits remains lost to this day.

== Plot ==
Elmer the mouse spars a punching bag, claiming to be the strongest mouse in the county, while other impressed animals watch. Elmer's grandmother spits tobacco while knitting, requesting Elmer to cut wooden planks from logs, which he does easily. However, she is unsatisfied, revealing herself to be stronger than Elmer as she punches a tree into pieces and one last piece into clothes pins with no difficulty. She refuses to indulge Elmer's fantasy of being a fighter.

That night, Elmer sneaks out to partake in a boxing match with a bulldog, who he is able to fight, but not for long as he is knocked out. He wakes up early and wants to try again, but is knocked back into the chair by a pig. His grandmother is furiously listening in the radio and bikes to the arena. As the bulldog fails to knock out Elmer but spins the arena around. As Elmer's grandmother bikes into the arena, she easily knocks out the bulldog with no problem. Elmer is spanked after his grandmother is declared the de-facto winner.

== Home media ==
The short is included as an extra on Looney Tunes Mouse Chronicles: The Chuck Jones Collection. It was later released in a higher quality restoration on Looney Tunes Collector's Vault: Volume 3.
