= I Wanna Play House =

1936 film by Isadore Freleng

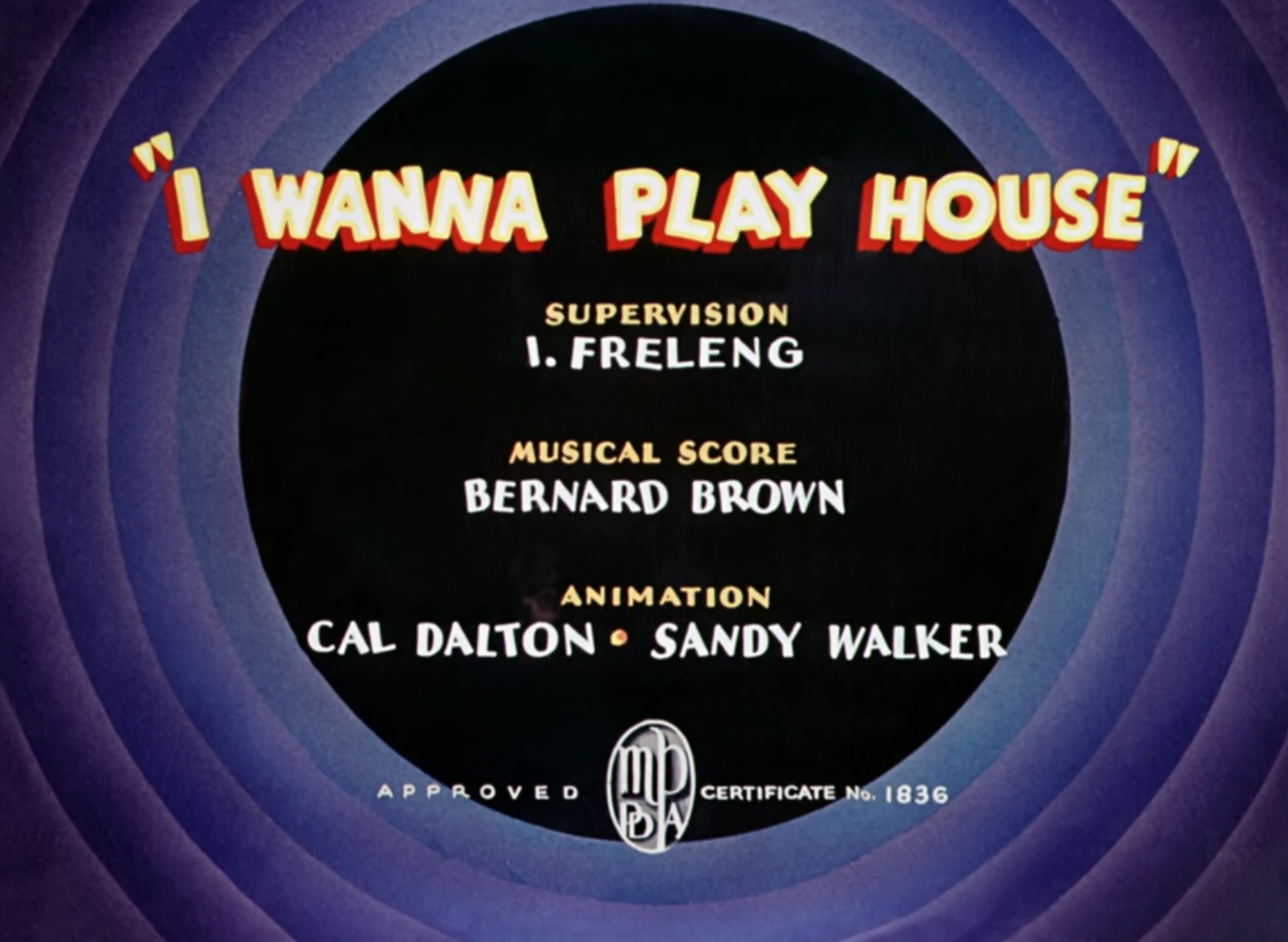
- Title card
- Directed by: Isadore Freleng
- Produced by: Leon Schlesinger
- Starring: Bernice Hansen; Billy Bletcher
- Music by: Bernard Brown
- Animation by: Cal Dalton; Sandy Walker
- Color process: Technicolor
- Production company: Leon Schlesinger Productions
- Distributed by: Warner Bros. Productions; The Vitaphone Corporation
- Release date: January 11, 1936
- Running time: 7 mins
- Country: United States
- Language: English

I Wanna Play House is a 1936 American animated comedy short film directed by Isadore Freleng. It was released on January 11, 1936. It is the 53rd film in the Merrie Melodies series and the first known to use the series' signature colored rings and cursive "That's all, folks!" logo.

== Plot ==
A bear sleeps while his two children, a black cub and a brown cub, play rough. The black cub is interested in a turtle, only to be bitten on the nose in retaliation. The brown cub mocks him, leading to the black cub attempting to stone him, only for the stone to hit their father. As the cubs accuse each other, the bear determines by spitting tobacco that the brown cub is responsible and spanks him.

The brown cub brushes off the punishment and agree to play hide and seek. While the brown cub wastes an absurd amount of time on the countdown, the black cub hides first at an empty gypsy wagon, where he finds a lot of food. He stacks a tall tower of deli meats and cheese on bread to make a sandwich, which he takes a bite of, but becomes drunk after sipping cider. The brown cub finds him singing drunkenly with a hat on and fights with him.

During their fight, the bear cubs accidentally release the wagon's brakes as it tumbles down a steep cliffside. They are barely able to drive it as it tumbles over trees. They manage to reactivate the brake, grinding the wheels to dust as it crashes on a tree. The brown cub is knocked out by the bottle of cider, which the bear sees as being drunk and spanks him, while the black cub walks away, only to be stoned by the brown cub.

== See also ==
- Looney Tunes and Merrie Melodies filmography (1929–1939)
