= The Miller's Daughter (1934 film) =

1934 film by Isadore Freleng

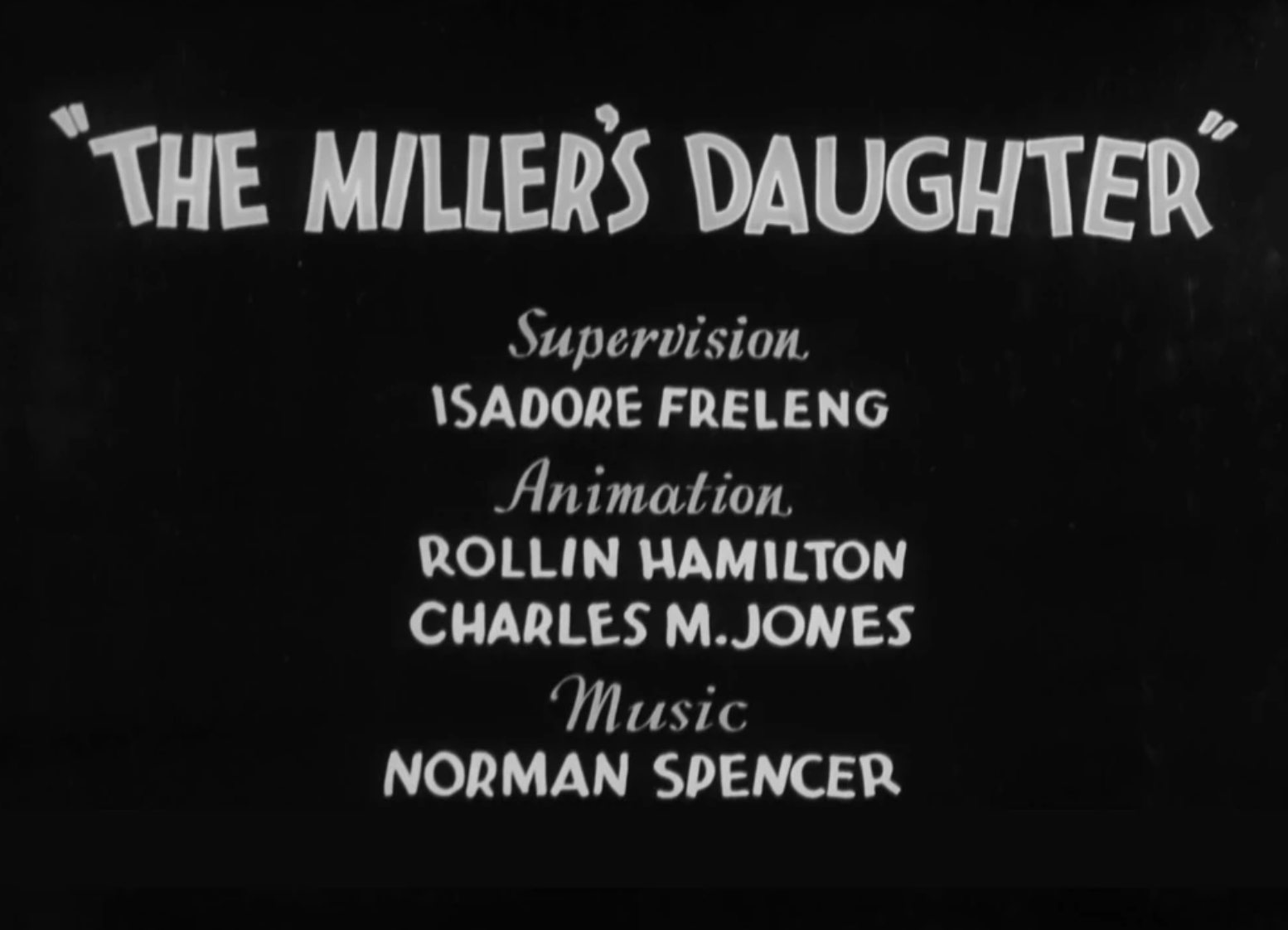
- Title card
- Directed by: Isadore Freleng
- Produced by: Leon Schlesinger
- Music by: Norman Spencer
- Animation by: Rollin Hamilton; Charles M. Jones
- Color process: Black-and-white
- Production company: Leon Schlesinger Productions
- Distributed by: Warner Bros. Productions; The Vitaphone Corporation
- Release date: October 13, 1934
- Running time: 7 minutes
- Country: United States
- Language: English

The Miller's Daughter is a 1934 American animated comedy short film directed by Isadore Freleng. It was originally released on October 13, 1934. It is the 38th film in the Merrie Melodies series, featuring the titular song by Lou Handman and Al Bryan. It is notable as the first cartoon in the series to credit Charles M. Jones, who would become one of the series' most prominent directors for decades.

== Plot ==
A cat trying to catch a caged bird knocks over a small ceramic figurine of a young country girl, breaking it. A maid gathers the broken pieces and puts them in a bin in the attic, despite the glue for chinaware being right next to the bin. The matching boy figurine, a shepherd, comes to life, and he and his lamb go to the attic to rescue their companion.

After the shepherd boy glues the girl back together, they dance to the titular song, which is sung by figurines of The Three Stooges fashioned into the three wise monkeys. The boy conducts a performance of The Blue Danube with clocks. The lamb unwisely awakens a lion figurine, who pursues it and causes it to paint itself black. As the girl, boy, and lamb escape the attic, the lion dashes himself to pieces against the attic door. The shepherd boy, girl, and lamb escape back downstairs, breaking a table lamp in the process. The maid, believing the cat to have broken the lamp, swats it with a broom and chases it outside.
