= I'm a Big Shot Now =

1936 film by Isadore Freleng

- Directed by: Isadore Freleng
- Produced by: Leon Schlesinger
- Starring: Lionel Stander
- Music by: Bernard B. Brown
- Animation by: Jack Carr; Riley Thomson
- Color process: Technicolor
- Production company: Leon Schlesinger Productions
- Distributed by: Warner Bros. Productions; The Vitaphone Corporation
- Release date: April 11, 1936
- Running time: 7 min
- Country: United States
- Language: English

I'm a Big Shot Now is a 1936 American animated comedy short film directed by Isadore Freleng. The short was released on April 11, 1936. It is the 56th film in the Merrie Melodies series. It was re-released as a "Blue Ribbon" reissue in 1944 and 1954, rendering the original film and credits lost to this day.

== Plot ==
In a bustling city occupied by birds, a gangster bird sings the title song in a saloon. The lyrics attract the suspicion of a nearby police officer, who enters and is beat to a pulp by the gangster. The gangster then spots a nearby bank and commands his subordinates to rob it quickly, as he stands guard and quickly makes a getaway with his subordinates on an associate's car. The police dispatches officers to chase the gangsters, as they return fire and speed through the wild. The gangster hides in a treehouse with his peers, laughing in glee when he finds that the police has offered a bounty of 500 worms for him. Unfortunately, a passing police officer spots his car and notifies his peers, who immediately start a shootout with the gangster. After numerous attempts to subdue him, they shoot him from below and drop him into the police car, where they subdue him and send him to prison. He sings "I'm Just a Jailbird Now" from his jail cell.
