= The Girl at the Ironing Board =

1934 film by Isadore Freleng

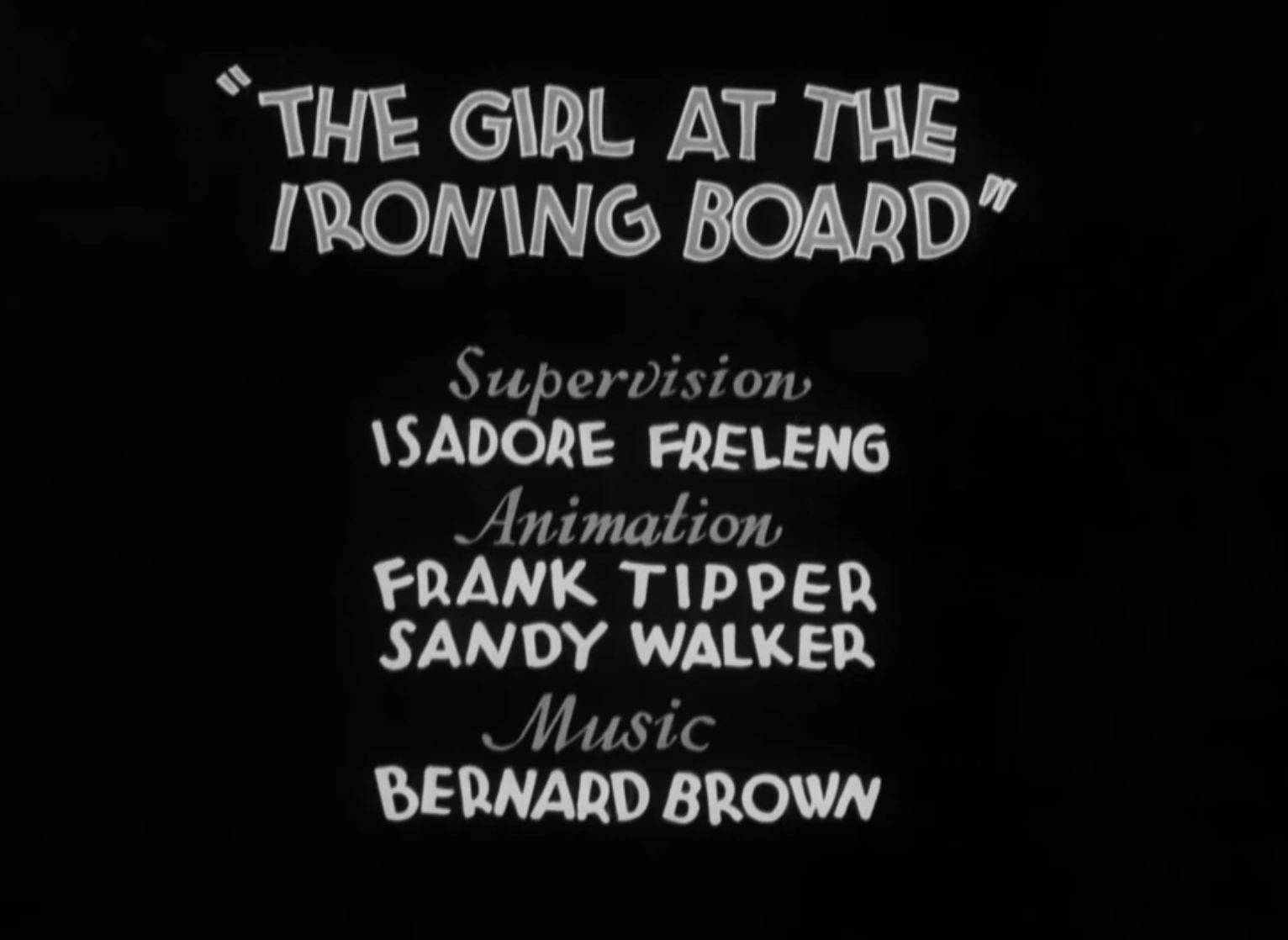
- Title card
- Directed by: Isadore Freleng
- Produced by: Leon Schlesinger
- Music by: Bernard Brown
- Animation by: Frank Tipper; Sandy Walker
- Color process: Black-and-white
- Production company: Leon Schlesinger Productions
- Distributed by: Warner Bros. Pictures; The Vitaphone Corporation
- Release date: August 23, 1934
- Running time: 7 min
- Country: United States
- Language: English

The Girl at the Ironing Board is a 1934 American animated comedy short film directed by Isadore Freleng. It was originally released on August 23, 1934. It is the 37th film in the Merrie Melodies series.

== Plot ==
Women work at a laundromat and sing and dance to the titular song. Men work in absurd departments of the shop such as "collar-sharpening" and "button-breaking" assignments; clothes' collars are literally sharpened to the point it can cut through thin string, while the button-breaking worker is confused when he finds a zipper.

The workers leave for the night "as the (k)night falls", depicted by a statue of a knight literally falling. A man dumps his laundry at the shop, serenading a woman who also dumps her laundry at the shop. As they walk away, their laundry rise from the packages and also fall in love with each other. As they sing the titular song, other laundry items also play instruments and dance to the song. They waltz as the song ends to the crowd's cheers.

Two pajamas then dance to a jazz number which the other clothes follow suit. A malicious-looking man drops off his laundry at the shop. Despite this inoffensive act, his clothes are actually malicious and abducts the woman's clothes, then escapes on an ironing board, only to hit a pillar and are thrown out. The villainous clothes punch the man's clothes as a fistfight occurs, but the man's clothes manage to push the villain's clothes into water and eventually a heater, where the villain's clothes are burnt and disfigured while the couple's clothes celebrate.
