= 1933 in animation =

Events in 1933 in animation.

== Events ==
=== January ===
- January 21: The Mickey Mouse short The Mad Doctor, produced by Walt Disney, is released.

=== February ===
- February 17: The Betty Boop cartoon Is My Palm Read premiers, gaining much notoriety for its risqué content.

=== May ===
- May 25: Burt Gillett's Disney cartoon Three Little Pigs premieres. The cartoon becomes a huge hit, also thanks to the catchy song Who's Afraid of the Big Bad Wolf?, co-composed by Frank Churchill and Ann Ronell.

=== July ===
- July 14: The Fleischer Studios' Popeye the Sailor is released, marking the animated debuts of Popeye, Olive Oyl, and Bluto.
- Ub Iwerks studio releases the first Willie Whopper cartoon.

=== August ===
- August 26: Hugh Harman and Friz Freleng's Bosko's Picture Show produced by Leon Schlesinger Productions is released, It is the final Bosko cartoon at Warner Bros. as well as the last for Harman-Ising before taking the character to MGM, It is also notable for having Bosko apparently saying the word "fuck".

=== September ===
- September 9: Tom Palmer's Buddy's Day Out produced by Leon Schlesinger Productions is released, it marks the debuts of Buddy and his girlfriend Cookie.

=== Specific date unknown ===
- Ub Iwerks invents the multiplane camera.

== Films released ==
- 2 January – Merry Dog (United States)
- 6 January:
  - Betty Boop's Ker-Choo (United States)
  - Tight Rope Tricks (United States)
- 7 January:
  - Building a Building (United States)
  - The Shanty Where Santy Claus Lives (United States)
- 8 January – Jealous Lover (United States)
- 10 January – Wedding Bells (United States)
- 16 January – The Plumber (United States)
- 21 January:
  - Coo Coo the Magician (United States)
  - The Mad Doctor (United States)
- 22 January – Robin Hood (United States)
- 25 January – Sassy Cats (United States)
- 27 January – Betty Boop's Crazy Inventions (United States)
- 30 January – The Terrible Troubadour (United States)
- 3 February – Magic Mummy (United States)
- 5 February – Hansel and Gretel (United States)
- 7 February – The Medicine Show (United States)
- 11 February – Bosko in Person (United States)
- 13 February – Scrappy's Party (United States)
- 17 February – Is My Palm Read (United States)
- 19 February – The Tale of a Shirt (United States)
- 25 February – Wooden Shoes (United States)
- 27 February – The Shriek (United States)
- 4 March – The Beer Parade (United States)
- 5 March – Down On the Levee (United States)
- 10 March – Betty Boop's Penthouse (United States)
- 11 March – Birds in the Spring (United States)
- 13 March – The Lumber Champ (United States)
- 18 March – Mickey's Mellerdrammer (United States)
- 19 March – Who Killed Cock - Robin (United States)
- 29 March – Bunnies and Bonnets (United States)
- 31 March:
  - Happy Hoboes (United States)
  - Puzzled Pals (United States)
  - Snow-White (United States)
- 2 April – Oh! Susanna (United States)
- 3 April – Flip's Lunch Room (United States)
- 8 April:
  - Father Noah's Ark (United States)
  - Ye Olden Days (United States)
- 10 April – Going to Blazes (United States)
- 13 April – Chikara to Onna no Yo no Naka (Japan)
- 16 April – Romeo and Juliet (United States)
- 18 April – The Broadway Malady (United States)
- 21 April – Betty Boop's Birthday Party (United States)
- 22 April – The False Alarm (United States)
- 28 April – Hook and Ladder Hokum (United States)
- 30 April – Pirate Ship (United States)
- 1 May – Russian Dressing (United States)
- 8 May – Techno-Cracked (United States)
- 9 May – The Match Kid (United States)
- 12 May – Betty Boop's May Party (United States)
- 13 May – Wake Up the Gypsy in Me (United States)
- 14 May – Tropical Fish (United States)
- 20 May – Technoracket (United States)
- 22 May – Beau Best (United States)
- 25 May – Three Little Pigs (United States)
- 26 May – In the Park (United States)
- 28 May – Cinderella (United States)
- 30 May – Bulloney (United States)
- 1 June – House Cleaning (United States)
- 2 June – Betty Boop's Big Boss (United States)
- 3 June – Bosko's Knight-Mare (United States)
- 5 June:
  - Nature's Workshop (United States)
  - The World's Affair (United States)
- 11 June – King Zilch (United States)
- 14 June:
  - I Like Mountain Music (United States)
  - Antique Antics (United States)
- 17 June – Mickey's Mechanical Man (United States)
- 19 June – Ham and Eggs (United States)
- 23 June – Mother Goose Land (United States)
- 24 June – A Chinaman's Chance (United States)
- 25 June – The Banker's Daughter (United States)
- 1 July – Mickey's Gala Premier (United States)
- 3 July – Pin Feathers (United States)
- 7 July – Doughnuts (United States)
- 9 July – The Oil Can Mystery (United States)
- 14 July – Popeye the Sailor (United States)
- 23 July – Fanny In the Lion's Den (United States)
- 28 July – The Phantom Rocket (United States)
- 29 July – Old King Cole (United States)
- 31 July – Confidence (United States)
- 4 August – The Old Man of the Mountain (United States)
- 11 August – Hypnotic Eyes (United States)
- 12 August:
  - Bosko the Musketeer (United States)
  - Pale-Face (United States)
- 14 August – Hot and Cold (United States)
- 19 August – Lullaby Land (United States)
- 25 August – Grand Uproar (United States)
- 26 August – Bosko's Picture Show (United States)
- 1 September – I Heard (United States)
- 4 September – King Klunk (United States)
- 5 September – Out of the Ether (United States)
- 8 September:
  - Movie Struck (United States)
  - Pick-Necking (United States)
- 9 September – Buddy's Day Out (United States)
- 16 September – The Pied Piper (United States)
- 18 September – Five and Dime (United States)
- 22 September:
  - Pick-Necking (United States)
  - Whacks Museum (United States)
- 23 September – I've Got to Sing a Torch Song (United States)
- 29 September – I Yam What I Yam (United States)
- 6 October:
  - A Gypsy Fiddler (United States)
  - Fanny's Wedding Day (United States)
  - Morning, Noon and Night (United States)
  - Sandman Tales (United States)
- 9 October – She Done Him Right (United States)
- 12 October – Soda Squirt (United States)
- 13 October – Krazy Spooks (United States)
- 20 October – Beanstalk Jack (United States)
- 27 October – Blow Me Down! (United States)
- 3 November:
  - Betty Boop's Hallowe'en Party (United States)
  - The Village Blacksmith (United States)
- 6 November – The Zoo (United States)
- 10 November – Hollywood Babies (United States)
- 11 November – Buddy's Beer Garden (United States)
- 13 November – Stage Krazy (United States)
- 17 November:
  - I Eats My Spinach (United States)
  - Robinson Crusoe (United States)
  - Streamlined Robinson Crusoe (United States)
- 24 November – The Bill Poster (United States)
- 25 November:
  - Giantland (United States)
  - Jack and the Beanstalk (United States)
- 27 November – The Merry Old Soul (United States)
- 30 November – Little Boy Blue (United States)
- 1 December – Parade of the Wooden Soldiers (United States)
- 8 December – Scrappy's Auto Show (United States)
- 9 December:
  - Buddy's Show Boat (United States)
  - The Night Before Christmas (United States)
- 15 December:
  - In Venice (United States)
  - The Curio Shop (United States)
- 16 December – Sittin' on a Backyard Fence (United States)
- 17 December – Seasin's Greetinks! (United States)
- 18 December – Parking Space (United States)
- 29 December:
  - The Sunny South (United States)
  - Wild Elephinks (United States)

== Births ==
=== January ===
- January 6: John Clive, English actor (voice of John Lennon in Yellow Submarine), (d. 2012).
- January 8: Charles Osgood, American news anchor (voice of the Narrator in Horton Hears a Who!), (d. 2024).
- January 11: Kiyoshi Kobayashi, Japanese voice actor (voice of Daisuke Jigen in Lupin the Third, Bem in Humanoid Monster Bem, Adrian Rubinsky in Legend of the Galactic Heroes, Mohammed Avdol in JoJo's Bizarre Adventure (OVA), Watari in Death Note, dub voice of The Wolf in Droopy, Commander Norman in Thunderbirds, the title character in Shazzan, Splinter in Teenage Mutant Ninja Turtles, Roscoe in Oliver & Company, Jonah Hex in Batman: The Animated Series, Katscratch in SWAT Kats: The Radical Squadron, Hernán Cortés in The Road to El Dorado, Jerry in Totally Spies!, Thief in Samurai Jack, Nava in Balto II: Wolf Quest, Rick Dicker in The Incredibles, Ice President in Adventure Time), (d. 2022).
- January 12: Carlos Vogt, Argentine comic artist and animator (worked for studio Burone Bruché), (d. 2018).
- January 14: Stan Brakhage, American film director and animator (Mothlight), (d. 2003).
- January 16: Julio Medina, Colombian actor (voice of Miguel in The New Adventures of Zorro, provided additional voices for Scooby-Doo and Scrappy-Doo, Mister T), (d. 2024).
- January 17: Shari Lewis, American ventriloquist, puppeteer, and actress (voice of Princess Nida in Arabian Knights, the title character and Cousin Maggie in Honey Halfwitch), (d. 1998).
- January 23: Chita Rivera, American actress (voice of the Witch in Dora the Explorer, Katy in the Happily Ever After: Fairy Tales for Every Child episode "Thumbelina"), (d. 2024).

=== February ===
- February 2: Tony Jay, English actor (voice of Claude Frollo in The Hunchback of Notre Dame, Monsieur D'Arque in Beauty and the Beast, Megabyte in ReBoot, Shere Khan in TaleSpin, Jungle Cubs, The Jungle Book 2, and House of Mouse, Baron Mordo in Spider-Man, Galactus and Terrax in Fantastic Four, Chairface Chippendale in The Tick, Lord Dregg in Teenage Mutant Ninja Turtles, Bootlick in Tom and Jerry: The Movie, Dr. Lipschitz in Rugrats), (d. 2006).
- February 24: Toshiya Ueda, Japanese actor (voice of Titicaca in The Adventures of Pepero, Futon in Rascal the Raccoon, Nefertari Cobra in One Piece, and Vilk in The Promised Neverland, dub voice of Uncle Chuck Hedgehog in Sonic the Hedgehog, Dr. Benjamin Boris Zachary Karbunkle in Biker Mice from Mars, Owl in Winnie the Pooh, and Aloysius in Infinity Train), (d. 2022).

=== March ===
- March 1: Inessa Kovalevskaya, Soviet and Russian animation director (The Bremen Town Musicians).
- March 14:
  - Michael Caine, English actor (voice of Finn McMissile in Cars 2, Lord Redbrick in Gnomeo & Juliet and Sherlock Gnomes).
  - Quincy Jones, American record producer, songwriter, composer, arranger, and film and television producer (portrayed himself in Fantasia 2000, voiced himself in The Boondocks episode "A Huey Freeman Christmas"), (d. 2024).
- March 19:
  - Richard Williams, Canadian-English animator and director (The Thief and the Cobbler, directed the animated scenes in What's New Pussycat?, A Funny Thing Happened on the Way to the Forum, Casino Royale, The Charge of the Light Brigade, Can Heironymus Merkin Ever Forget Mercy Humppe and Find True Happiness?, The Return of the Pink Panther, The Pink Panther Strikes Again and Who Framed Roger Rabbit), (d. 2019).
  - Renée Taylor, American actress (voice of Gloria Genarro in Bob's Burgers, Mrs. Start in Ice Age: The Meltdown, Lucille in the Superman: The Animated Series episode "Warrior Queen").
- March 23: Dave Frishberg, American composer and lyricist (I'm Just a Bill from Schoolhouse Rock!), (d. 2021).
- March 24: Lee Mendelson, American animation producer (Peanuts specials, Here Comes Garfield, Garfield on the Town, The Romance of Betty Boop, Garfield and Friends), (d. 2019).
- March 30: Joe Ruby, American animator, animation writer (Walt Disney Animation Studios, Hanna-Barbera, DePatie-Freleng), and animation producer (co-founder of Ruby-Spears Productions, co-creator of Scooby-Doo), (d. 2020).

=== April ===
- April 5: Frank Gorshin, American actor, impressionist, and comedian (voice of Daffy Duck in Superior Duck, Foghorn Leghorn in Pullet Surprise, Yosemite Sam in From Hare to Eternity, Sir 1023 and Quart in Rudolph's Shiny New Year, Hugo Strange in The Batman, The Reverend Jack Cheese in The Ren & Stimpy Show episode of the same name, Barney Stone and Clovy in the Johnny Bravo episode "Blarney Buddies"), (d. 2005).
- April 6: Yasuo Muramatsu, Japanese voice actor (voice of Tom in One Piece, Pisco in Case Closed, Revil in Mobile Suit Gundam, Japanese voice of Steelbeak in Darkwing Duck, Jacob in Joseph: King of Dreams, Santa Claus in Prep & Landing, Cyrus in ReBoot), and founder of Office Kaoru, (d. 2024).
- April 14: Shani Wallis, British actress and singer (voice of Lady Mouse in The Great Mouse Detective, narrator in The Pebble and the Penguin).
- April 15: Elizabeth Montgomery, American actress (voice of Samantha in The Flintstones episode "Samantha", Barmaid in the Batman: The Animated Series episode "Showdown"), (d. 1995).
- April 16: Takeo Watanabe, Japanese musician and composer (Cutie Honey, Candy Candy, Mobile Suit Gundam), (d. 1989).
- April 17: Ron W. Miller, American businessman, film producer, football player (president and CEO of the Walt Disney Company from 1978 to 1984), (d. 2019).
- April 26: Carol Burnett, American actress, comedian, singer and writer (voice of Mrs. Hammerbotham in The Trumpet of the Swan, Kangaroo in Horton Hears a Who!, Hara in The Secret World of Arrietty, Wind Breeze in Trolls: Holiday in Harmony, Great Aunt Sylvia in Curious George, Chairol Burnett in Toy Story 4 and the Forky Asks a Question episode "What is Love?", the Narrator, Mrs. Rabbit, and Cat in the HBO Storybook Musicals episode "The Tale of Peter Rabbit", herself in the Scooby-Doo and Guess Who? episode "The Movieland Monsters!").
- April 29: Marvin Goldhar, Canadian actor (voice of Cedric Sneer in The Racoons), (d. 2002).

=== May ===
- May 3: James Brown, American singer, dancer, musician, record producer and bandleader (voice of Hostage Negotiator in the Duckman episode "Kidney, Popsicle, and Nuts", himself in The Simpsons episode "Bart's Inner Child"), (d. 2006).
- May 7: Johnny Unitas, American football quarterback (voiced himself in The Simpsons episode "Homie the Clown"), (d. 2002).
- May 14: Vladimiro Missaglia, aka Miro, Italian comics artist and animator, (d. 2008).
- May 21: Richard Libertini, American actor (voice of Dijon in the DuckTales franchise, Wally Llama in the Animaniacs episode "Wally Llama", Tellyrand in the Pinky and the Brain episode "Napoleon Brainaparte", Mr. Marini in the Life With Louie episode "Mr. Anderson's Opus", Commissioner in The Real Adventures of Jonny Quest episode "Bloodlines", Information Desk Clerk in the Duckman episode "Das Sub", Ragtag in the Static Shock episode "Power Play", Dr. Myrell in The Zeta Project episode "The Wrong Morph", Apple Merchant in The Greatest Adventure: Stories from the Bible episode "The Creation"), (d. 2016).
- May 28: Zelda Rubinstein, American actress and human rights activist (voice of Atrocia Frankenstone in The Flintstone Comedy Show, Psychiatrist in The Flintstones: On the Rocks, Darkwing Duck's Mother and Negaduck's Mother in the Darkwing Duck episode "The Secret Origins of Darkwing Duck", Madame Zeldarina in the Goof Troop episode "Rally Round the Goof", Patty's mother in the Hey Arnold! episode "Polishing Rhonda"), (d. 2010).

=== June ===
- June 5: Jimmy T. Murakami, American film director and animator (Toei Animation, The Snowman, The Magic Pear Tree), (d. 2014).
- June 8: Joan Rivers, American actress and comedian (narrator in The Adventures of Letterman segments in The Electric Company, and voice of Zonthara in Dave the Barbarian, Dot Matrix in Spaceballs: The Animated Series, Bubbe in Arthur, Annie Dubinsky in The Simpsons episode "The Ten-Per-Cent Solution", and herself in Shrek 2), (d. 2014).
- June 11: Gene Wilder, American actor and comedian (voice of Letterman in The Adventures of Letterman segments in The Electric Company), (d. 2016).
- June 17: Bill Kresse, American animator and comics artist (Terrytoons), (d. 2014).

=== July ===
- July 4: Charles Degotte, Belgian comics artist and animator (worked for Dupuis' animation studio), (d. 1993).
- July 15: Guido Crepax, Italian comics artist and animator, (d. 2003).
- July 25: Frank Mancuso Sr., American executive (Paramount Pictures, Metro-Goldwyn Mayer), (d. 2026).
- July 26: Lance Percival, English actor, comedian and singer (voice of Paul McCartney and Ringo Starr in The Beatles, Old Fred in Yellow Submarine), (d. 2015).
- July 27: Stu Gilliam, American actor (voice of Freddie "Curly" Neal in Harlem Globetrotters, Super Globetrotters, and The New Scooby-Doo Movies, Dingdog in The Houndcats), (d. 2013).
- July 29:
  - Lou Albano, Italian-American wrestler and actor (voice of Mario in The Super Mario Bros. Super Show!), (d. 2009).
  - Anne Rogers, English actress (voice of Elizabeth II in The Wild Thornberrys episode "Sir Nigel", continued voice of Mrs. Potts in the Beauty and the Beast franchise).
- July 31: Per Lygum, Danish animator and comics artist (worked for the animation department of Marten Toonder, directed 1980s Christmas TV commercial for Tuborg Beer), (d. 1997).

=== August ===
- August 1: Dom DeLuise, American actor (voice of Jeremy in The Secret of NIMH, Tiger in An American Tail, Fagin in Oliver & Company, Itchy Itchiford in All Dogs Go to Heaven, Stanley in A Troll in Central Park, Koosalagoopagoop in Dexter's Laboratory), (d. 2009).
- August 16:
  - Max Kleven, Norwegian-born American second unit director (Who Framed Roger Rabbit), (d. 2026).
  - Julie Newmar, American actress (voice of Catwoman in Batman: Return of the Caped Crusaders and Batman vs. Two-Face, Martha Wayne in the Batman: The Brave and the Bold episode "Chill of the Night!").
- August 25: Tom Skerritt, American actor (English dub voice of Colonel in Wings), (d. 2026).

=== September ===
- September 1:
  - Ann Richards, American politician (voice of Annie in Home on the Range, Thunder Mountain Woman in the Happily Ever After: Fairy Tales for Every Child episode "Rip Van Winkle", herself in the King of the Hill episode "Hank and the Great Glass Elevator"), (d. 2006).
  - Tsai Chin, Chinese actress, singer, director, teacher, and author (voice of Nai Nai in Abominable, Old Woman in Titan A.E., Aunt Wu in Avatar: The Last Airbender, Linda in the We Bare Bears episode "Mom App").
- September 5: Eddie Carroll, Canadian actor (voice of Jiminy Cricket since 1973), (d. 2010).
- September 14: Zoe Caldwell, Australian-American actress (voice of the Grand Councilwoman in Lilo & Stitch), (d. 2020).
- September 18: Fred Willard, American actor and comedian (voice of Officer Brown in King of the Hill, Dave Campbell in Family Guy, Dad in Monster House, Jack Hench in Kim Possible, Boogie Man in The Grim Adventures of Billy and Mandy, Melvin in Chicken Little, Mr. Doozy in Mickey Mouse Mixed-Up Adventures, Pop-Pop in The Loud House, Sammy Raymond in the Hey Arnold! episode "Rich Guy", F.R.E.D. in the Dexter's Laboratory episode "Lab on the Run", Wally Kogen in The Simpsons episode "Sunday, Cruddy Sunday"), (d. 2020).
- September 19: David McCallum, Scottish actor and musician (voice of C.A.R. in The Replacements, Professor Paradox in the Ben 10 franchise, Alfred Pennyworth in Batman: Gotham Knight and the DC Animated Movie Universe, Zeus in Wonder Woman, Merlin in the Batman: The Brave and the Bold episode "Day of the Dark Knight!"), (d. 2023).
- September 24: Robert Ellis, American actor (voice of Cubby in Peter Pan), (d. 1973).
- September 25: Dawn Greenhalgh, Canadian actress (voice of Queen Celeste in Babar, Schanhorst in Cadillacs and Dinosaurs), (d. 2026).

=== October ===
- October 16: Nobuyo Ōyama, Japanese actress (voice of the titular character in the Doraemon franchise, Monokuma in Danganronpa: The Animation), (d. 2024).
- October 20: Nonnie Griffin, Canadian actress (voice of Funshine Bear in Care Bears, Harmony Bear in Care Bears Movie II: A New Generation, Shadu in Ewoks, Pepper Potts, Black Widow, and Enchantress in The Marvel Super Heroes), (d. 2019).

=== November ===
- November 3: Ken Berry, American actor, dancer and singer (voice of the title character in Peter-No-Tail, Seymour Grey in The New Batman Adventures episode "Never Fear"), (d. 2018).
- November 4: Jacqueline Cohen, French voice actress (French dub voice of Rita in Monsters vs. Aliens), (d. 2025).
- November 6: Bob Kaliban, American actor, singer, and musician (voice of Daddy in A Family Circus Christmas, Big Paw and Announcer in The Berenstain Bears Meet Bigpaw, Croak and Slick in The Missing Link, Bewildered Bat in I Go Pogo, Bramble Brother #2 in The Charmkins, Lou and Mr. Chips in Schoolhouse Rock!, Josh, Merlin and King Jared in Princess Gwenevere and the Jewel Riders, Little Cup and Plush in A Little Curious, Judge, Police Chief and Mayor in Top Cat: The Movie), (d. 2020).
- November 7: Jackie Joseph, American actress and writer (voice of Melody in Josie and the Pussycats, Sandy in Dinky Dog, Pauline in The Fonz and the Happy Days Gang episode "Perilous Pauline").
- November 15: Jack Burns, American comedian and actor (voice of Bard Kane in Wait Till Your Father Gets Home, Sid the Squid in Animaniacs, Edward Christian in The Simpsons episode "Beyond Blunderdome"), (d. 2020).
- November 19: Larry King, American actor and radio host (voice of Doris the Ugly Stepsister in Shrek, Wax Larry King in Gravity Falls, himself in The Simpsons episodes "One Fish, Two Fish, Blowfish, Blue Fish" and "Sideshow Bob Roberts", the Arthur episode "Elwood City Turns 100!", and Bee Movie), (d. 2021).
- November 23: Paul Maslansky, American producer (Police Academy), (d. 2024).
- November 25: Kathryn Crosby, American actress and singer (voice of Princess Yasminda in 1001 Arabian Nights), (d. 2024).
- November 26: Robert Goulet, American singer and actor (voice of Jaune-Tom in Gay Purr-ee, Asst. Coach Ferret in the My Gym Partner's a Monkey episode "Animal School Musical", himself in The Simpsons episode "$pringfield (or, How I Learned to Stop Worrying and Love Legalized Gambling)", and the Gary the Rat episode "Manrattan", singing voice of Mikey Blumberg in Recess and Wheezy in Toy Story 2), (d. 2007).
- November 28: Paul Gruwell, American animator (Hanna-Barbera, Heavy Metal, Marvel Productions, Garbage Pail Kids, Bonkers), background artist (The New Batman Adventures, Batman Beyond, Mission Hill), storyboard artist (Garbage Pail Kids, Alvin and the Chipmunks, DuckTales, Bonkers, Duckman), sheet timer (The Simpsons) and director (Garfield and Friends), (d. 2014).

=== December ===
- December 1:
  - Lou Rawls, American actor and singer (performed in several Garfield specials, voice of Harvey in Hey Arnold!, himself in The Proud Family episode "The Party"), (d. 2006).
  - Hiroshi Fujimoto, Japanese manga artist (Doraemon, Ninja Hattori-kun, Perman, Obake no Q-Tarō), (d. 1996).
- December 4: Wink Martindale, American disc jockey and game show host (voice of Sphinx Martindale in the Hercules episode "Hercules and the Driving Test", Wink Martiandale in The Jetsons episode "ASTRONomical I.Q."), (d. 2025).
- December 5: Adolph Caesar, American actor (voice of Hotwing and Seymour in SilverHawks, Brutish in Tarzoon: Shame of the Jungle), (d. 1986).
- December 8:
  - Ana Ofelia Murguia, Mexican actress (voice of the title character in Coco), (d. 2023).
  - William Frederick Knight, American voice actor (voice of Daisuke Aramaki in Ghost in the Shell, Gordon Rosewater in The Big O, the Old Man in Paranoia Agent, Kuzemi in Eureka Seven, Danzo Shimura in Naruto Shippuden, Taishi in Tokko), (d. 2022).
- December 10: Mako, Japanese-American actor (voice of Iroh in Avatar: The Last Airbender, Aku in Samurai Jack, Mr. Yamaguchi in Rugrats in Paris: The Movie, Happy Cat and Ah-Choo in Duck Dodgers, Master Splinter in TMNT, the Ancient One in the What's New, Scooby-Doo? episode "Big Appetite in Little Tokyo", the Narrator in The Grim Adventures of Billy & Mandy episode "A Kick in the Asgard", Master Offay in the Super Robot Monkey Team Hyperforce Go! episode "Monster Battle Club Now!"), (d. 2006).
- December 12: Josy Eisenberg, French film producer (À Bible Ouverte), (d. 2017).
- December 15: Tim Conway, American actor and comedian (voice of Barnacle Boy in SpongeBob SquarePants, himself in The Simpsons episode "The Simpsons Spin-Off Showcase" and The New Scooby-Doo Movies episode "The Spirit Spooked Sports Show", Hermie in Hermie and Friends), (d. 2019).
- December 17: Fernando Laverde, Colombian animator and film director (La pobre viejecita, Cristóbal Colón, Martín Fierro), (d. 2022).
- December 26: Caroll Spinney, American puppeteer (Sesame Street), voice actor, comics artist and animator (Crazy Crayons), (d. 2019).
- December 29: Joseph Maher, Irish actor (voice of Emile Dorian in the Batman: The Animated Series episode "Tyger, Tyger"), (d. 1998).

== Deaths ==
=== February ===
- February 15: Pat Sullivan, Australian-American cartoonist, animator, and producer (Felix the Cat), dies at age 47.

=== April ===
- April 1: Joaquín Xaudaró, Spanish cartoonist, caricaturist, illustrator, and animator, (co-founder of the Sociedad Española de Dibujos Animados (SEDA), collaborated with K-Hito in the production on an animated film), dies at age 60.

=== September ===
- September 10: Louis Glackens, American illustrator and animator (Barré Studio, Bray Productions), dies at age 65 or 66.
