= 1929 in animation =

Events in 1929 in animation.

== Events ==
=== March ===
- March 17: Walt Disney gives the Mickey Mouse short Plane Crazy an official release, now as a sound cartoon. The short marks the debut of Clarabelle Cow.

=== June ===
- June 28: In the Mickey Mouse cartoon The Plowboy, produced by Walt Disney, Horace Horsecollar makes his debut.

=== July ===
- July 31: In the Mickey Mouse cartoon The Karnival Kid, Walt Disney voices Mickey for the first time.

=== August ===
- August 22: Walt Disney's The Skeleton Dance, the first Silly Symphony, is released.

=== Specific date unknown ===
- Harman and Ising produce Bosko, the Talk-Ink Kid for Warner Bros. Pictures, it's a pilot for a series that will be known as Looney Tunes.
- The first pornographic animated cartoon, Eveready Harton in Buried Treasure, is made as a collaboration between Raoul Barré, Max Fleischer and Paul Terry's studios.

== Films released ==
- 5 January – Cow Belles (United States)
- 6 January:
  - Snapping the Whip (United States)
  - Wooden Money (United States)
- 18 January – Hospitalities (United States)
- 21 January – Yanky Clippers (United States)
- 1 February – Reduced Weights (United States)
- 15 February – Flying Yeast (United States)
- 18 February – Sick Cylinders (United States)
- 1 March – Vanishing Screams (United States)
- 15 March:
  - A Joint Affair (United States)
  - The Barn Dance (United States)
- 17 March – Plane Crazy (United States)
- 19 March – Sheep Skinned (United States)
- 20 March – The Opry House (United States)
- 1 April – Alpine Antics (United States)
- 13 April – The Lone Shark (United States)
- 16 April – The Water Cure (United States)
- 27 April – Torrid Toreadors (United States)
- 30 April – When the Cat's Away (United States)
- May – Bosko, the Talk-Ink Kid (United States)
- 11 May – Golf Socks (United States)
- 12 May – The Faithful Pup (United States)
- 19 May – The Ball Park (United States)
- 25 May – Petting Larceny (United States)
- 26 May – Custard Pies (United States)
- 1 June – The Barnyard Battle (United States)
- 8 June – Hat Aches (United States)
- 22 June – Fur Peace (United States)
- 28 June – The Plowboy (United States)
- 6 July – Auto Suggestion (United States)
- 20 July – Sleepy Holler (United States)
- 21 July – House Cleaning Time (United States)
- 22 July:
  - Jungle Jingles (United States)
  - Weary Willies (United States)
- 31 July – The Karnival Kid (United States)
- 15 August – Ratskin (United States)
- 22 August – The Skeleton Dance (United States)
- 28 August – Mickey's Follies (United States)
- 2 September – Race Riot (United States)
- 12 September – Canned Music (United States)
- 15 September – Jungle Fool (United States)
- 16 September – Oil's Well (United States)
- 26 September – El Terrible Toreador (United States)
- 29 September – Permanent Wave (United States)
- 1 October – Mickey's Choo-Choo (United States)
- 10 October – Port Whines (United States)
- 11 October – Summertime (United States)
- 15 October – The Jazz Fool (United States)
- 18 October – Mill Pond (United States)
- 24 October – Springtime (United States)
- 30 October – Hell's Bells (United States)
- 1 November – Barnyard Melody (United States)
- 7 November:
  - Sole Mates (United States)
  - Tuning In (United States)
- 15 November – Jungle Rhythm (United States)
- 24 November – Hurdy Gurdy (United States)
- 2 December – The Haunted House (United States)
- 18 December – Wild Waves (United States)
- 19 December - The Merry Dwarfs (United States)
- 30 December – Farm Relief (United States)

== Births ==
=== January ===
- January 20:
  - Arte Johnson, American comic actor (voice of Tyrone in Baggy Pants and the Nitwits, Farquad and Skull Ghost in Scooby-Doo Meets the Boo Brothers, Devil Smurf in The Smurfs, Weerd in The 13 Ghosts of Scooby-Doo, Count Ray and Dr. Ludwig von Strangeduck in DuckTales, Newt in Animaniacs, Virman Vundabar in the Justice League Unlimited episode "The Ties That Bind"), (d. 2019).
  - Jean-Jacques Perrey, French electronic music performer, composer, producer and promoter (SpongeBob SquarePants, Fetch! with Ruff Ruffman, The Mighty B!, South Park, The Simpsons), (d. 2016).
- January 23: Carl Banas, Canadian radio personality and actor (voice of Head Elf and Misfit Elephant in Rudolph the Red-Nosed Reindeer, Scorpion in Spider-Man, Schaeffer in The Racoons), (d. 2020).
- January 26: Jules Feiffer, American cartoonist and author (Munro), (d. 2025).
- January 30: Morton Stevens, American film and television composer (Tiny Toon Adventures), (d. 1991).
- January 31: Jean Simmons, English actress (voice of Old Sophie in Howl's Moving Castle, Council Member #2 in Final Fantasy: The Spirits Within), (d. 2010).

=== February ===
- February 10: Jerry Goldsmith, American composer and conductor (The Secret of NIMH, Mulan, Looney Tunes: Back in Action), (d. 2004).
- February 16: Olga James, American singer and actress (voice of Mrs. Thomas in Sealab 2020), (d. 2025).
- February 17: Patricia Routledge, English actress (voice of Cousin Ribby in The World of Peter Rabbit and Friends), (d. 2025).
- February 22: James Hong, American actor (voice of Mr. Ping in the Kung Fu Panda franchise, Chi-Fu in Mulan, Daolon Wong in Jackie Chan Adventures, Mandarin in Super Robot Monkey Team Hyperforce Go!, Mr. Gao in Turning Red, Grandpa Wing in Gremlins: Secrets of the Mogwai, Professor Chang in the Teen Titans episode "X").
- February 23: Queta Lavat, Mexican actress (Latin American dub voice of Jane Jetson in The Jetsons), (d. 2023).
- February 28: Frank Gehry, Canadian–American architect and designer (voiced himself in The Simpsons episode "The Seven-Beer Snitch" and the Arthur episode "Castles in the Sky"), (d. 2025).

=== March ===
- March 1: Maurice Kanbar, American Producer (founder of Kanbar Entertainment for Hoodwinked! and Hoodwinked Too! Hood vs. Evil), (d. 2022).
- March 5: Paul Coker Jr., American illustrator (Mad), character designer and production designer (Rankin/Bass Productions, Whatever Happened to... Robot Jones?), (d. 2022).
- March 10: Alice Hirson, American actress (voice of Mrs. Johnson in Baby Blues, Peg Chapman in the Godzilla: The Series episode "Wedding Bells Blew", Mrs. Perry in the Trash Truck episode "Pranks"), (d. 2025).
- March 12: Billy Lee, American actor (voice of the boy in The Reluctant Dragon), (d. 1989).
- March 13: Peter Breck, American actor (voice of Farmer Brown in The New Batman Adventures episode "Critters"), (d. 2012).
- March 14: José Santa Cruz, Brazilian actor, comedian and voice actor (Brazilian dub voice of Smart Ass in Who Framed Roger Rabbit, Kim Jong-Il in Team America: World Police, Frederick in One Hundred and One Dalmatians, General Li Shang in Mulan, Professor Archimedes Q. Porter in Tarzan, Dr. Frankenstein in Alvin and the Chipmunks Meet Frankenstein, Uncle Max in The Lion King 1½, Scrooge McDuck in Mickey's Twice Upon a Christmas, Big Weld in Robots, August Gusteau in Ratatouille, J. Jonah Jameson in the Spider-Man franchise, Penguin in the Batman franchise, King Randor in He-Man and the Masters of the Universe, Megatron in the Transformers franchise, Magneto in the X-Men franchise, Tiamat in Dungeons & Dragons, Mechanicles in Aladdin, Roy Rooster in Garfield and Friends, Lawrence Limburger in Biker Mice from Mars, Sergeant Cosgrove in Freakazoid!, Big Daddy in The Fairly OddParents, Dr. Hibbert in The Simpsons, Señor Senior Senior in Kim Possible, Numbuh One in Codename: Kids Next Door, Ryu Granger in Beyblade, Watari in Death Note, Mad Mod in Teen Titans, Hiroshi Sato in The Legend of Korra, Lex Luthor in Super Friends), (d. 2024).
- March 31: Frank Braxton, American animator (Warner Bros. Cartoons, Jay Ward Productions, UPA, Peanuts), (d. 1969).

=== April ===
- April 1:
  - Barbara Bryne, British-American actress (voice of Urgl in The Neverending Story), (d. 2023).
  - Jonathan Haze, American actor (voice of Mann Servante in The Angry Beavers episode "The Day the World Got Really Screwed Up"), (d. 2024).
  - Payut Ngaokrachang, Thai animator and film director (The Adventure of Sudsakorn), (d. 2010).
- April 5: Nigel Hawthorne, English actor (voice of Captain Campion in Watership Down, Dr. Boycott in The Plague Dogs, Fflewddur Fflam in The Black Cauldron, Professor Porter in Tarzan), (d. 2001).
- April 8: Betty Paraskevas, American writer and lyricist (co-creator of The Kids from Room 402, Maggie and the Ferocious Beast and Marvin the Tap-Dancing Horse), (d. 2010).
- April 10:
  - Max von Sydow, Swedish actor (voice of Art Forger in The Simpsons episode "The Art of War", narrator in Moomins and the Comet Chase, Zeus in the Swedish dub of Hercules), (d. 2020).
  - Liz Sheridan, American actress and dancer (voice of Mrs. Stillman in Life with Louie, Mrs. Rothberg in the American Dad! episode "An Apocalypse to Remember"), (d. 2022).
- April 13: Ann Sullivan, American animator (Walt Disney Animation Studios), (d. 2020).
- April 14:
  - Gerry Anderson, English television and film producer, director, writer and occasional voice artist (Dick Spanner, P.I., Lavender Castle, New Captain Scarlet, Firestorm), (d. 2012).
  - Cliff Roberts, American photographer, cartoonist, animator and comic book artist (Hanna-Barbera, DePatie-Freleng Enterprises), (d. 1999).
- April 17: Michael Forrest, American actor (voice of Alex Rosewater in The Big O), (d. 2026).
- April 21:
  - Barry Blitzer, American television writer (Hanna-Barbera), (d. 2010).
  - Doug Goodwin, American pianist, author, songwriter and composer (DePatie–Freleng Enterprises), (d. 2023).
- April 26: Gordon Hunt, American writer, director (Hanna-Barbera), and actor (voice of Wally in Dilbert), (d. 2016).
- April 29: Phyllis Craig, American animator (Walt Disney Animation Studios, Hanna-Barbera) and ink and paint supervisor (Film Roman), (d. 1997).

=== May ===
- May 5: Ilene Woods, American actress and singer (voice of Cinderella in Cinderella), (d. 2010).
- May 6: Polly Lou Livingston, American actress (voice of Tree Trunks in Adventure Time and Adventure Time: Distant Lands, Slippy Napkins in Bravest Warriors), (d. 2021).
- May 10: George Coe, American actor (voiced of Arthur Woodhouse in Archer, Tee Watt Kaa in Star Wars: The Clone Wars, Toza in The Legend of Korra episode "A Leaf in the Wind", Albert Einstein in Celebrity Deathmatch, Miguel in Wrinkles), (d. 2015).
- May 11: Margaret Kerry, American actress (voice of Mermaid in Peter Pan), and inspiration and model for Tinker Bell in Peter Pan, (d. 2026).
- May 23:
  - Paul Wexler, American actor (voice of car mechanic in 101 Dalmatians), (d. 1979).
  - Corinne Conley, American actress (voice of Dolly for Sue and Mrs. Donner in Rudolph the Red-Nosed Reindeer, Dorothy Gale in Tales of the Wizard of Oz, Granny in Franklin).
- May 24: Art Leonardi, American animator (Warner Bros. Cartoons, DePatie-Freleng Enterprises, directed the animated scenes for Trail of the Pink Panther and Curse of the Pink Panther), storyboard artist (DePatie-Freleng Enterprises, Challenge of the GoBots, Pound Puppies, Tiny Toon Adventures, Shelley Duvall's Bedtime Stories), character designer (Super President, Here Comes the Grump, Hanna-Barbera, Tiny Toon Adventures: How I Spent My Vacation, Problem Child), prop designer (Problem Child), background artist (Jetsons: The Movie), writer (The Pink Panther Show), producer (Pink Panther and Sons, Shelley Duvall's Bedtime Stories, Problem Child) and director (DePatie-Freleng Enterprises, Pink Panther and Sons, Tiny Toon Adventures, Shelley Duvall's Bedtime Stories).
- May 28: Shane Rimmer, Canadian actor (voice of Louis Watterson in The Amazing World of Gumball), (d. 2019).

=== June ===
- June 3: Brian Lewis, British illustrator, comics artist and animator (Yellow Submarine), (d. 1978).
- June 4: Digby Wolfe, English actor (voice of Ziggy the vulture in The Jungle Book), (d. 2012).
- June 5: Normand Hudon, Canadian animator and comics artist (Au P'tit Café), (d. 1997).
- June 17: James Shigeta, Japanese-American actor (voice of General Li in Mulan, Old Wanderer in the Avatar: The Last Airbender episode "The Spirit World-Winter Solstice, Part 1"), (d. 2014).
- June 25: Eric Carle, American author, designer and illustrator (The Very Hungry Caterpillar and Other Stories), (d. 2021).
- June 26: Milton Glaser, American graphic designer (Mickey Mouse in Vietnam, Norman Normal), (d. 2020).
- June 27: Donyo Donev, Bulgarian cartoonist, caricaturist, animator and comics artist (The Three Fools, Trimata Glupaci, Chetirmata Glupaci, Umno Selo), (d. 2007).
- June 29: Michio Mamiya, Japanese composer (Grave of the Fireflies), (d. 2024).

=== July ===
- July 1: Hal Sutherland, American painter, film director and animator (Walt Disney Company, co-founder of Filmation), (d. 2014).
- July 3: Béatrice Picard, Canadian actress (French dub voice of Marge Simpson in The Simpsons, Baylene in Dinosaur, Coco in Coco), (d. 2025).
- July 5:
  - Katherine Helmond, American actress (voice of Lizzie in the Cars franchise, Connie Stromwell in the Batman: The Animated Series episode "It's Never Too Late", Dugong in The Wild Thornberrys episode "Reef Grief"), (d. 2019).
  - Chikao Ohtsuka, Japanese voice actor (voice of Goemon Ishikawa XIII in Lupin III), (d. 2015).
- July 10: Jef Cassiers, Belgian actor, comedian, animator and film director (directed Jan Zonder Vrees (John the Fearless)), (d. 1987).
- July 11: Sandy Frank, American television producer, distributor, and marketer (Battle of the Planets), (d 2026).
- July 13: René Laloux, French animator and film director (Les Escargots, La Planète Sauvage, Les Maîtres du temps), (d. 2004).
- July 17: Helene Stanley, American actress (model for Cinderella in Cinderella, Aurora in Sleeping Beauty, and Anita Radcliffe in One Hundred and One Dalmatians), (d. 1990).
- July 18:
  - Dick Button, American figure skater and analyst (voiced himself in the Animaniacs episode "All the Words in the English Language"), (d. 2025).
  - James H. Rosenfield, American executive (CBS), (d. 2026).
- July 23: Maya Buzinova, Russian animator (The Mitten, Gena the Crocodile, Cheburashka), (d. 2022).
- July 24: Don Iwerks, American studio executive (Disney), (d. 2026).
- July 30:
  - Sid Krofft, Canadian-American puppeteer (H.R. Pufnstuf, Land of the Lost) and screenwriter (H.R. Pufnstuf, Land of the Lost), (d. 2026).
  - Martin Strudler, American animator and background designer (Warner Bros. Animation, Muppet Babies, Dungeons & Dragons, Wizards), (d. 2020).

=== August ===
- August 13: Pat Harrington Jr., American actor (voice of Ray Palmer/Atom and Roy Harper/Speedy in The Superman/Aquaman Hour of Adventure, the title character and Deux-Deux in The Inspector shorts, Moe Howard in The New Scooby-Doo Movies, Jon's father in A Garfield Christmas), (d. 2016).
- August 21: Vance Gerry, American storyboard artist, concept artist, and character designer (Walt Disney Animation Studios), (d. 2005).

=== September ===
- September 2: Victor Spinetti, Welsh actor, author, poet and raconteur (voice of Dick Deadeye in Dick Deadeye, or Duty Done, Texas Pete in SuperTed, Glump in The Princess and the Goblin), (d. 2012).
- September 5: Bob Newhart, American actor and comedian (voice of Bernard in The Rescuers and The Rescuers Down Under, Leonard in Rudolph the Red-Nosed Reindeer: The Movie, himself in The Simpsons episode "Bart the Fink"), (d. 2024).
- September 21: Elsa Raven, American actress (voice of Hannele in American Pop), (d. 2020).
- September 25: Pepe Soriano, Argentine actor (voice of Dr. Crux in Cóndor Crux, la leyenda), (d. 2023).

=== October ===
- October 8: Manuel García Ferré, Argentine cartoonist and animator (Hijitus), (d. 2013).
- October 11: Michael Magee, Canadian actor, singer and author (voice of Cyril Sneer in The Racoons), (d. 2011).
- October 16: Edward Bleier, American television executive (Warner Bros. Animation), (d. 2023).
- October 25: Robin Parkinson, English actor (narrator in Button Moon), (d. 2022).
- October 27:
  - Glenn Schmitz, American animator and comics artist (Walt Disney Animation Studios, Hanna-Barbera, Ruby-Spears Enterprises), (d. 2000).
  - Maxine Markota, American animation checker (What's New, Mr. Magoo?, DePatie-Freleng Enterprises, Filmation, Daffy Duck's Quackbusters, The Simpsons), (d. 2012).
- October 28: Joan Plowright, English actress (voice of Baylene in Dinosaur, Victoria Plushbottom in Curious George), (d. 2025).

=== November ===
- November 1: Francisco Macián, Spanish animator, film director and producer (El mago de los sueños), (d. 1976).
- November 6: June Squibb, American actress (voice of Bertha in Ralph Breaks the Internet, Margaret in Toy Story 4, Gerel in Soul, Tullabett Grancie in The Fungies!, Gramsy in Little Ellen, Nostalgia in Inside Out 2).
- November 15: Ed Asner, American actor and president of the Screen Actors Guild (voice of Carl Fredricksen in Up, Sergeant Cosgrove in Freakazoid! and the Teen Titans Go! episode "Huggbees", Roland Daggett in Batman: The Animated Series, Hudson in Gargoyles, Granny Goodness in Superman: The Animated Series, Justice League Unlimited, and Superman/Batman: Apocalypse, J. Jonah Jameson in Spider-Man, Santa Claus in Elf: Buddy's Musical Christmas, Regular Show, Olive, the Other Reindeer, and The Story of Santa Claus, Mr. Leonard in Foodfight!, Kent Nelson in the Young Justice episode "Denial"), (d. 2021).
- November 17: Goro Naya, Japanese voice actor (voice of Inspector Zenigata in Lupin III), (d. 2013).
- November 21: Mike Reynolds, American television writer (Robotech, Captain Harlock and the Queen of a Thousand Years, Macron 1, Digimon: Digital Monsters) and voice actor (voice of Matthew McCreep in The Smurfs and the Magic Flute, Billy Bones in The Treasure Planet, Dolza, Senator Russo, Zentraedi and other various characters in Robotech, Old Bearcat in Peter-No-Tail in Americat, Nezu in Akira, Hometown Adult #1 and Ket's Grandmother in Kiki's Delivery Service, Professor Fortier in Journey to the Heart of the World, various characters in the Power Rangers franchise, Van in Cowboy Bebop, Gennai in Digimon: Digital Monsters, Railspike in Transformers: Robots in Disguise, King of Ministoria in Bastard!!, Colonel in Cowboy Bebop: The Movie, Poseidon and Professor Kazumi in Cyborg 009, Lord Orkham in Wolf's Rain, Nibu, Ministry of Justice Official and Commissioner-General in Ghost in the Shell: Stand Alone Complex), (d. 2022).
- November 23: Bruce Petty, Australian political cartoonist, sculptor and animated film director (Leisure, Global Haywire), (d. 2023).
- November 25: Pavao Štalter, Croatian animator, director, screenwriter, scenographer and artist, (d. 2021).
- November 29: Mike Kricfalusi, American voice actor and father of John Kricfalusi (voice of Mr. Höek and Staff Lobster in Ren & Stimpy "Adult Party Cartoon"), (d. 2020).
- November 30:
  - Joan Ganz Cooney, American television writer and producer (Sesame Street, Cro).
  - Sherman Labby, American storyboard artist and production illustrator (Filmation, Hanna-Barbera, Marvel), (d. 1998).
  - Dick Clark, American radio and television personality, television producer and actor (voice of Lefty Redbone in The Angry Beavers episode "The Posei-Dam Adventure", himself in the Fantastic Four episode "The Origin of the Fantastic Four", the Pinky and the Brain episodes "You'll Never Eat Food Pellets in This Town Again!" and "The Pinky and the Brain Reunion Special", the Recess episode "Yes, Mikey, Santa Does Shave", the Futurama episode "Space Pilot 3000", and The Simpsons episode "Treehouse of Horror X"), (d. 2012).

=== December ===
- December 1: David Doyle, American actor (voice of Sheriff Gomer Cleghorn in the TaleSpin episode "Citizen Khan", Professor Hubert in the Road Rovers episode "A Hair of the Dog That Bit You", Sam Delaney in the Mighty Ducks: The Animated Series episode "The Human Factor", first voice of Lou Pickles in Rugrats), (d. 1997).
- December 7: Boris Stepantsev, Russian film director, animator, and illustrator (Karlsson-on-the-Roof), (d. 1983).
- December 13: Christopher Plummer, Canadian actor (voice of Charles Muntz in Up, Henri le Pigeon in An American Tail, The Grand Duke of Owls in Rock-a-Doodle, narrator in Madeline), (d. 2021).
- December 21: Anita Gordon, American singer and actress (voice of the Harp in Fun and Fancy Free), (d. 2015).
- December 24: David H. DePatie, American film and television producer (last executive of Warner Bros Cartoons, co-founder of DePatie-Freleng Enterprises and executive producer at Marvel Productions), (d. 2021).

=== Specific date unknown ===
- Frank Andrina, American animator and timing director (Warner Bros. Animation, The Smurfs, Wacky Races, The Flintstones), (d. 2012).
- Esfandiar Ahmadieh, Iranian film director, (d. 2012).

== Deaths ==
=== April ===
- April 20: Charles Allan Gilbert, American animator, illustrator, and World War I-era camouflage artist, (pioneer of silhouette animation, worked for John R. Bray on the production of a series of moving shadow plays called Silhouette Fantasies. These Art Nouveau-styled films, which were made by combining filmed silhouettes with pen-and-ink components, were serious interpretations of Greek myths), dies at age 55.

=== May ===
- May 2: Segundo de Chomón, Spanish film director, cinematographer, and screenwriter, (pioneer in the production of trick films, his films relied extensively on animation, a field in which he was a pioneer; he used animation techniques which were seldom used by his main competitor, Georges Méliès. His stop-motion film Sculpteur moderne featured heaps of clay molding themselves into detailed sculptures that were capable of minor movements.) dies at age 57.
