= Chilly Con Carmen =

1930 animated film

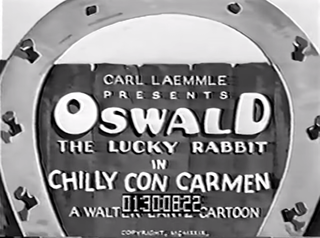
The title card of Chilly Con Carmen.

Chilly Con Carmen (also known as Chile Con Carmen) is a 1930 animated short film which was presented by Carl Laemmle and was produced by Walter Lantz, who would go on to produce Woody Woodpecker with his wife, Gracie Lantz. The film, which was animated by R. C. Hamilton, Tom Palmer and Bill Nolan, features Oswald the Lucky Rabbit, as he attempts to engage in a game of bullfighting in order to charm a Mexican girl over his other girlfriend, Miss Hippo.

The film was recorded on Western Electric apparatus, which was an early sound-on-film system. The same sound system was used in another Oswald film entitled Hurdy Gurdy, which includes Oswald being substituted as a dancer for a street performer, after the original one is swallowed up by bubblegum, which was from Oswald. That film was released in the year before this film.

Although the roman numeral year on the title card translates to 1929, the film was copyrighted on January 15, 1930, and was released on February 3 that same year. The film was also released by the film company Universal Pictures, and this film is part of the Universal series of Oswald short films.

== Plot ==
Oswald comically cutting up the bull like a potato.

Oswald sings phrases of nonsense playing a guitar. He is serenading to his hippo girlfriend, Miss Hippo, who is at her window. She dances to the music, but whilst she is dancing, she slips and falls out of the window. She comically lands on Oswald, the force of which drives his body underground and erupting back to the surface in another spot. After that, Miss Hippo and Oswald both passionately kiss, but soon a Mexican cat girl appears. Oswald, who finds the Mexican girl more attractive then Miss Hippo, rejects Miss Hippo in order to pursue the Mexican girl. The Mexican girl begins to dance to Bizet's Carmen Harbanera. Her dance ultimately ends with the girl kissing Oswald. Miss Hippo, in response to the Mexican girl's dance, begins to dance to the opening title theme of another Oswald film, entitled Hurdy Gurdy. What follows is a dance-off between the two women, both trying to appease Oswald. At the end of the dance-off, Oswald rejects Miss Hippo for the Mexican girl. After that, Tory is seen heading to a bull game, to the music of Toreador Song, where he will be fighting a bull. In response to his presence, both girls reject Oswald and attempt to charm Tory, by following him to his location. Once they get there, Tory begins to fight the bull in a boxing ring and also draws a target on the bull's stomach. However, Tory loses the fight, as he is comically kicked in the buttocks by the bull and is flung out of the arena. Oswald then spots Tory, steals his hat and goes into the arena. Oswald's appearance is met with applause, including the two girls who rejected him earlier. Oswald then picks up a rag, and then dances with it, to anger the bull. His dance ends with Oswald placing the rag onto the bull's head and also stabbing the bull in the buttocks. Oswald then tries to stab the bull again with the sword, and that ends with Oswald comically cutting the bull like a potato. This does nothing, as the bull reassembles itself. The bull then tries to pursue Oswald. Their chase ends with Oswald ending up on a pole. The Mexican cat girl, who was watching Oswald from a podium, kisses Oswald, which makes him falls off the podium. This makes the bull go up the pole in order to catch Oswald. Oswald then gets a pin and hits the bull in the buttocks. Oswald does this until he leaves the pin there, so that the bull can not get off the pole. Oswald ends up winning the fight and the film ends with Oswald and the Mexican girl passionately kissing each other.

== Characters ==
In this film, there are a variety of characters. One of them is Oswald, who fights the bull and wins the attraction of the Mexican girl at the end of the film. There is also the bull, who is unnamed. He wins the fight against Tory, but ends up losing the other fight against Oswald near the end of the film. There is also the two women, which includes Miss Hippo, and the Mexican girl. They both fight in order to attempt to charm Oswald.

== Reception ==
Chilly Con Carmen was reviewed by the cinema magazines The Motion Picture News. Reviewed as Chile Con Carmen, the magazine reviewed the film very positively, stating that the film "equaled any sound cartoon screened in recent weeks", and also said that the audience should Make Room for Oswald.
