= Buddy's Beer Garden =

1933 film by Earl Duvall

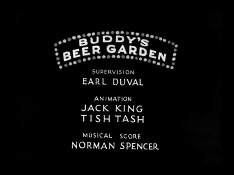
- Title card
- Directed by: Earl Duvall
- Produced by: Leon Schlesinger
- Starring: Bernard Brown; Jeane Cowan; The Singing Guardsman
- Music by: Norman Spencer
- Animation by: Jack King; Tish Tash
- Color process: Black-and-white
- Production company: Leon Schlesinger Productions
- Distributed by: Warner Bros. Pictures; The Vitaphone Corporation
- Release date: November 11, 1933
- Running time: 7 minutes
- Country: United States
- Language: English

Buddy's Beer Garden is a 1933 American animated comedy short film directed by Earl Duvall. It was released on November 11, 1933. It is the 40th film in the Looney Tunes series and the second cartoon to feature Buddy.

It was the first of five cartoons directed by Earl Duvall, here credited as "Duval", and one of only three Buddy shorts directed by him. Musical direction was by Norman Spencer. It was also the first short with involvement from Francis von Taschlein, who was credited under his pseudonym Tish Tash, which he adopted due to anti-German sentiment; he first used that pen name in the 1933 film Hook and Ladder Hokum, and would eventually adopt the better-known pseudonym Frank Tashlin.

== Plot ==
Buddy operates a beer garden, which attracts a crowd of patrons singing "Oh du lieber Augustin", while he happily serves beer with his dog. A band plays music while a bartender fills mugs with beer, pushed to Buddy by a trombone, who then fills them to the brim with foam. Cookie knits several pretzels, which then are salted by the dog. Tongue sandwiches sing and lap up mustard. An impatient patron demands his beer, which he instantly swallows while holding the mug and waiter upon its arrival.

Buddy makes an instrument out of his steins while Cookie offers cigars and cigarettes to the patrons. The patron from before attempts to flirt with Cookie before buying a cigar and lighting it with a flamethrower. Cookie performs an exotic dance for the entire beer garden, and is joined by the same patron, and a piano which comes to life. Buddy continues to serve beer and cheese sandwiches.

As a final treat for his customers, Buddy introduces a caricature of Mae West who performs for the crowd. The patron is mesmerized by lust and drunkenly stumbles over to her with the intention of receiving a kiss, only to be sent flying by the goat mascot of a beer brand. As the patron hits one of the beer garden's glass windows, the singer is revealed to be a cross-dressed Buddy wearing lingerie and a bird cage used replicate West's voluptuousness. Buddy walks away while the bird in the cage mocks him and does a Jimmy Durante impression.

== Critical analysis and reception ==
In his analysis of the cartoon, professor of film studies Ethan de Seife wrote in his book, Tashlinesque: The Hollywood Comedies of Frank Tashlin:

Buddy's Beer Garden' ... is another archetypal cartoon: it is a perfect example of the style of the early 1930s Merrie Melodies. The film is an especially plain attempt to cash in on Disney's highly successful 'Silly Symphonies' formula. This plotless film's characters lack personalities but are aggressively cute, and everyone sings and bobs in time to the constant light-swing score — a technique known as 'Mickey Mousing'. It is a workmanlike cartoon; the only hints of Tashlinian humor are the appearances of an impossibly voluptuous Mae West figure and a wisecracking parrot that morphs into Jimmy Durante. The film offers no major insight into Tashlin's style; it is more interesting as evidence of Warners early, carbon-copy strategy of coping with the Disney monolith.

Beck and Friedwald wrote that "Buddy is not only Warner's greatest pre-Bugs Bunny authority on cross-dressing, in this particular film he's the closest thing the '30s have to Pee-Wee Herman. The Motion Picture Herald said "this is a very interesting short; good music and lots of laughs."

== Home media ==
The cartoon is available on the Looney Tunes Golden Collection: Volume 6. Along with Buddy's Day Out and Buddy's Circus, it is one of only three Buddy shorts released on DVD.
