= Permanent wave (disambiguation) =

A permanent wave, also known as a perm, is a hairstyle produced by setting the hair in waves or curls and then treating it with chemicals so that it lasts.

Permanent wave or Permanent Wave may also refer to:

- Permanent Wave (album), a 1980 album by the American artist John Hartford with Douglas and Rodney Dillard
- Permanent Wave (film), a 1929 animated film
- "Permanent Wave" (Quantum Leap), a 1991 television episode
- Permanent Waves, a 1980 album by the Canadian rock band Rush
- Standing wave, a wave which oscillates in time but whose peak amplitude profile does not move in space
- Permanent wave, a microgenre tag used by Swedish music streaming platform Spotify
