= Race Riot (film) =

1929 animated film

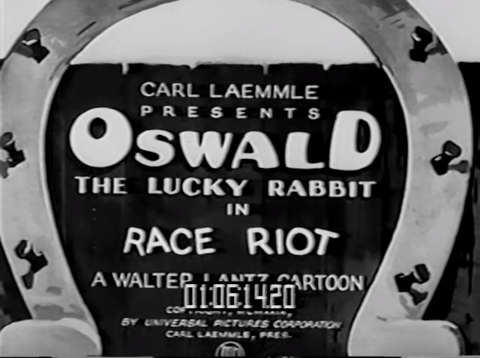
- Title card
- Directed by: Walter Lantz
- Story by: Walter Lantz; Bill Nolan
- Produced by: Walter Lantz
- Starring: Bill Nolan
- Music by: Bert Fiske
- Animation by: Walter Lantz; Bill Nolan; Tom Palmer
- Color process: Black and white
- Production company: Universal Cartoon Studios
- Distributed by: Universal Pictures
- Release date: September 2, 1929
- Running time: 6:29
- Language: English

Race Riot is a 1929 animated short film which is presented by Carl Laemmle and was produced by Walter Lantz, who would go on to produce and create the cartoon character Woody Woodpecker with his wife, Gracie Lantz. The film, for which Walter Lantz, Bill Nolan and Tom Palmer composed both the story and animation, shows Oswald the Lucky Rabbit, as he tries to win a horse race with his horse.

The film was recorded with Western Electric apparatus, which was an early sound-on-film system. This sound system was used in another Oswald short film entitled Hurdy Gurdy, which involves Oswald being substituted as a street performer's dancer after the original one was comically swallowed up by Oswald's chewing gum, or more specifically, bubble gum. That film was released in the same year as this one, albeit later.

Race Riot was released by the film company Universal Pictures, and is part of the Universal series of Oswald short films. It entered the public domain on January 1, 2025.

== Plot ==
The cartoon (with sound)

Oswald's horse is sleeping in a human bed. Oswald enters the room and wakes the horse with a scream, telling it the race is today. The horse, who does not want to participate in the race, feigns illness, with music from "Oh! How I Hate to Get Up in the Morning". Oswald attempts to give castor oil to the horse, but the horse dives through the wall and no longer pretends to be ill.

Oswald tries to weigh the horse with a scale, but he fails as the horse flattens it. Oswald whistles to a cigar-smoking, piano-playing dog to signal him to play a song. He plays while Oswald signals to the horse that he should do stretches, but the poor execution of the stretches angers Oswald, who storms off. The horse goes up to the pianist and whispers that he should play something different. The horse dances to the new song; Oswald comes back and seeing the horse dancing he punches it in the gut, stopping it dancing. Oswald comments on the horse dancing rather than stretching.

Oswald realises the race is starting when he hears applause. He mounts the horse and quickly explains what is going on. The race begins without them, but the crowd clap as they start the race. As they reach their first opponent, Oswald uses his ear to burst the hippo that a dog is using for racing. The dog runs in place of the hippo, who is now tiny, and Oswald jumps over them on the horse to reach third place. As they get to the second-place racer, an elephant and a mouse, Oswald uses a match to burn up the elephant ending its life. The mouse attempts to run the rest of the race, but Oswald and the horse jump over the mouse to become second in the race that theme became dark moving on. Oswald gets to his final opponent and tries to tie their horse's legs into a knot. They pass the other racer to become the front runner, but Oswald's horse tires out and the racer they just passed overtakes them. Angry, Oswald yells at his horse with his early wooden whistle voices and feeds it a piece of fence to get over boulders ahead, but the horse swallows one of them, turns into a boulder, and flattens the opponent ahead. Oswald goes into the lead and runs the rest of the race himself to victory.

While Oswald is bowing and tipping his ears to the audience, his horse — still a boulder acting like a bouncing ball — flattens him, and tiny Oswalds and horses run around in different directions.

== Reception ==
Race Riot was well received by the cinema magazines at that time. Variety said that the film was "silly stuff, as usual", and also said that the film would "make for a bright filler spot".

Motion Picture News said that film had "some highly amusing and clever cartoon work", and also said that the film contained "plenty of fun" and would "please anybody, anywhere, should he be man, beast or exhibitor".

The Film Daily said that the film contained Good Cartoonantics, and also said that the film is "excellent cartoon entertainment".
