= Those Were Wonderful Days =

1934 film by Bernard B. Brown

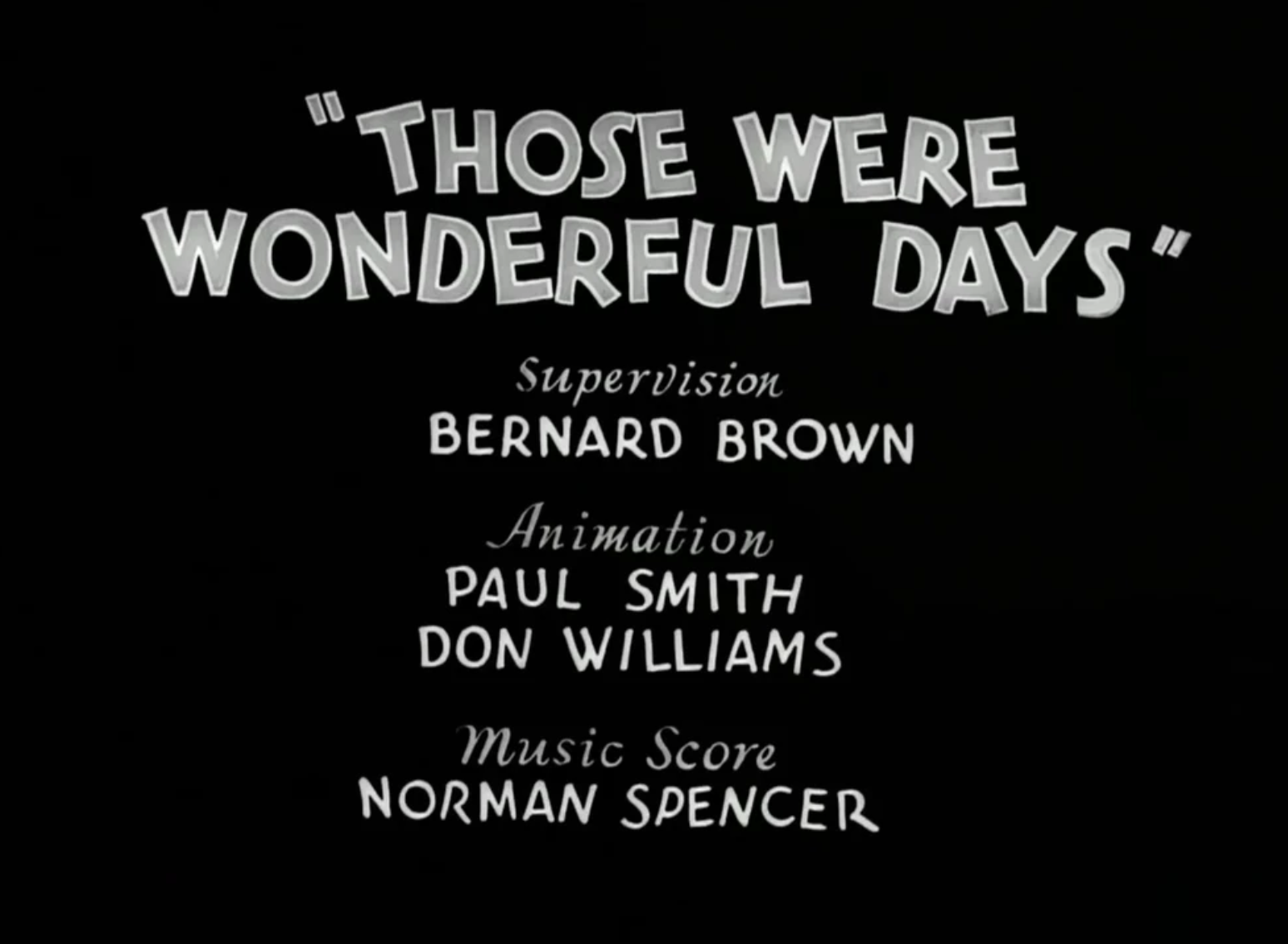
- Directed by: Bernard B. Brown
- Produced by: Leon Schlesinger
- Music by: Norman Spencer
- Animation by: Paul Smith; Don Williams
- Color process: Black and white
- Production company: Leon Schlesinger Productions
- Distributed by: Warner Bros. Pictures; The Vitaphone Corporation
- Release date: April 26, 1934
- Running time: 6 min
- Country: United States
- Language: English

Those Were Wonderful Days is a 1934 American animated comedy short film directed by Bernard B. Brown. It was originally released on April 26, 1934. It is the 33rd film in the Merrie Melodies series.

The original "So Long Folks" sequence was thought to have been lost due to a splice between an airing of Honeymoon Hotel which features that short's closing sequence. The original short, except for the titles, was found on a Nickelodeon Looney Tunes airing from 1990. However, a restored print with the correct closing sequence was first featured in a 2021 episode of MeTV's classic animation series Toon In with Me.

== Plot ==
Set in 1898, the cartoon offers a nostalgic look at the United States at the turn of the century. A barbershop quartet sing "Auld Lang Syne" while characters in pictures sing the titular song. Absurd gags such as a man acquiring a large free lunch and eating it on a voluptuous woman's hat ensue.

A gala picnic and celebration is held during annual Fourth of July celebration at the local fairground. Free beer is offered but is finished by three men, while a diving contest occurs. A villain notices a woman playing on a seesaw with her boyfriend and is attracted, sneaking with a tree and throwing dynamite to throw off the man long enough to abduct the woman. He escapes with the woman on a hot air balloon, while the man uses a conveniently placed cannon to propel himself into the air. He gets into a fight with the villain, who throws him off the balloon, but he is able to recover by using a flagpole. The villain cuts the hot air balloon, causing the woman to fall and use what remains of the hot air balloon as a parachute. As the fight continues, the man lights the balloon on fire and steals the villain's cape, using it to glide down and land safely. To his horror, the woman inexplicably falls for the villain after his hard landing.
