= Pettin' in the Park =

Pettin' in the Park may refer to:

- "Pettin' in the Park" (song), from the film Gold Diggers of 1933
- Pettin' in the Park (film), a 1934 animated short based on the song
