= Buddy's Day Out =

1933 film by Tom Palmer

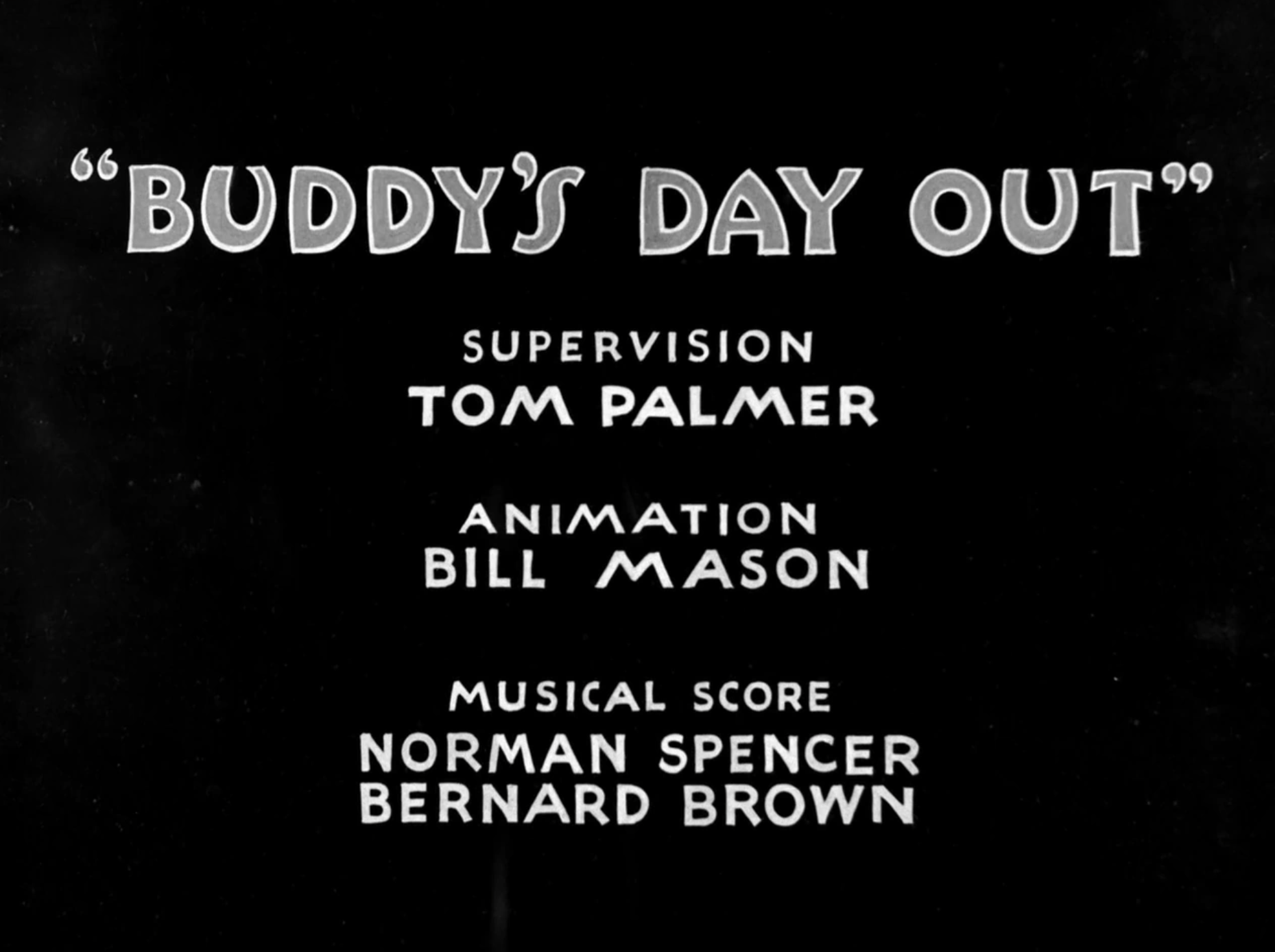
- Title card
- Directed by: Tom Palmer
- Produced by: Leon Schlesinger
- Starring: Bernard B. Brown
- Music by: Norman Spencer; Bernard Brown
- Animation by: Bill Mason
- Color process: Black-and-white
- Production company: Leon Schlesinger Productions
- Distributed by: Warner Bros. Pictures; The Vitaphone Corporation
- Release date: September 9, 1933
- Running time: 7 minutes
- Country: United States
- Language: English

Buddy's Day Out is a 1933 American animated comedy short film directed by Tom Palmer. The short was released in theaters on September 9, 1933, premiering with Goodbye Again. It is the 39th film in the Looney Tunes series and the first cartoon to feature Buddy, the second star of the series who was created by Palmer.

This short was the first cartoon in the series produced solely by Leon Schlesinger Productions, and the first not to feature Bosko, as well as the first without any involvement by Hugh Harman, Rudolf Ising and Frank Marsales. It is Palmer's only installment in the series as director, as he was fired during production.

== Plot ==
The film introduces the protagonist Buddy, his girlfriend Cookie, Cookie's baby brother Elmer and his dog Happy. Cookie gives Elmer a bath, while Buddy washes his car with a hose. Buddy's dog Happy plays with the hose, spraying the car with water, only to be tossed around by the water pressure.

Cookie puts on makeup to prepare for a romantic picnic, while Buddy starts his car with a crank starter, but when the car starts it runs off unattended through the neighborhood. It runs through a greenhouse, and stops at Cookie's house, draped with flowers from the greenhouse, which Cookie thinks is beautiful. Buddy loads a picnic basket in the car and drives off to the picnic with Cookie and Elmer. Happy runs behind and jumps in the car.

The car struggles to climb up a hill and comes to a stop at the picnic spot. Buddy unloads the car while Cookie plays guitar and sings. Various animals join in the song. Meanwhile Elmer and Happy eat some of the food from the picnic basket. Cookie scolds Elmer, who sadly climbs back in the car and accidentally starts it. The car, containing Elmer and Happy, rolls downhill out of control while Buddy and Cookie chase it, riding in Elmer's baby carriage.

The car crashes through various obstacles, including a rotary clothesline, which lands in the baby carriage, turning it into a helicopter. Buddy and Cookie, flying above the car, see it turn onto a railroad track facing an oncoming train. They land the baby carriage and use a ladder to divert the train off the track, saving Elmer.

== Production ==
The film was created in the wake of Hugh Harman and Rudolf Ising's fallout with Leon Schlesinger over budget concerns. Harman and Ising kept the rights to Bosko, who appeared as the star character of Looney Tunes for its first three years and took him with them. Additionally, the majority of animators were working exclusively for Harman and Ising, leaving Schlesinger without a studio to continue the series. Desperate to maintain his contract with Warner Bros. Pictures, Schlesinger set up his own studio, Leon Schlesinger Productions, and lured animators from Walt Disney Productions with higher salaries. Buddy was created to replace Bosko as the star of Looney Tunes, but proved not to be a successful character and was eventually replaced after two years.

The film was directed by Tom Palmer and was one of only two films completed by him for the Schlesinger studio. According to animation historian Michael Barrier, Palmer's approach in directing Buddy's Day Out was rather loose. In the story conferences which determined the contents of the film, Palmer would suggest adding "a funny piece of business", a visual gag. He failed to specify the use of anything particularly funny. According to later interviews with Bernard B. Brown and Bob Clampett, Palmer's original version of the film was virtually devoid of gags. The Warner Bros. studio rejected this version and the film had to be reworked extensively. Barrier considers the finished film, with gags added, to also have been "desperately unfunny". The gags were neither as well conceived, nor as well executed as those found in the animated short films of the competing Walt Disney Productions.

== Home media ==
Buddy's Day Out is available on the Looney Tunes Golden Collection: Volume 6. It is one of only three Buddy cartoons to be released on DVD, the others being Buddy's Beer Garden and Buddy's Circus.

== On PBS ==
A collection of cels from this short was the focus of one episode of the History Detectives series on PBS in 2010.

== Sources ==
- Barrier, Michael (2003), "Warner Bros., 1933-1940", Hollywood Cartoons: American Animation in Its Golden Age, Oxford University Press, ISBN 978-0199839223
