= Earl Duvall =

American artist and animator (1898–1950)

Owen Earl Duvall (/duːˈvɔːl/; June 7, 1898 – December 21, 1950) was an American artist and animator best known for his work on Disney comic strips in the early 1930s and for a handful of animated short films he directed at Warner Bros. Cartoons.

== Career ==
=== Disney Studio ===
Duvall started as a layout artist and later as a member of the story department at Walt Disney Productions. During this time, he also worked as a cartoonist on the Mickey Mouse daily strip and the Silly Symphony Sunday comic strip.

According to Jack Kinney, a director who worked at Disney for many decades, Duvall was a "charming story man" who dressed well and was "the spitting image of the Prince of Wales", but often "lived beyond his means". Duvall left Disney in rather unusual circumstances - pressed by Disney for several weeks to show his storyboards, Duvall simply gathered his belongings one day and left the company, "leaving Walt holding the bag".

=== Warner Bros ===
He was invited to Warner Bros. Cartoons in 1933 along with fellow Disney animator Tom Palmer to head up the studio in the wake of Hugh Harman and Rudolf Ising's departure. He was responsible for the creation of Buddy. In the event, Duvall was delayed working on other projects at Disney, and by the time he got to Warner Bros. Palmer, who directed the first Buddy cartoon, had already been fired and replaced by Friz Freleng.

Tom Palmer left the Schlesinger studio after completing only two animated short films. Duvall replaced him as the director of the next few films of the studio. Duvall had experience as a story man for both Disney and Harman and Ising. Norman McCabe, who worked as an inbetweener for the studio, recalled Duvall's resemblance to Prince Edward, the Prince of Wales. Animation historian Michael Barrier considers that Duvall's princely looks and "aura of sophistication" helped him get ahead. Wherever Duvall worked, people were at least giving him the benefit of the doubt.

During his time at the Schlesinger studio, Duvall directed a number of cartoons based around surprisingly adult themes, and was allowed to direct the studio's first color cartoon, Honeymoon Hotel in 1934. He only completed work on five animated short films. Three of them were part of the Looney Tunes, and two of them were part of the Merrie Melodies series. However, after a drunken argument with producer Leon Schlesinger, Duvall left the studio.

The departures of Palmer and Duvall left Schlesinger in need of new directors. Even composer Bernard B. Brown received credits for directing two Merrie Melodies shorts. By early 1934, Schlesinger appointed Friz Freleng as the main director of the Merrie Melodies series and Jack King as the main director of the Looney Tunes series.

== Death ==
Duvall died in 1950.

== Filmography ==
As Director/Supervisor.

- Buddy's Garage 1934 (short)
- Honeymoon Hotel 1934 (short)
- Sittin' on a Backyard Fence 1933 (short)
- Buddy's Show Boat 1933 (short)
- Buddy's Beer Garden 1933 (short)
