= I've Got to Sing a Torch Song =

1933 film by Tom Palmer

- Title card
- Directed by: Tom Palmer
- Produced by: Leon Schlesinger
- Starring: Bernard B. Brown; Selmer Jackson; Noreen Gamill; Bud Duncan; The Rhythmettes
- Music by: Bernard Brown; Norman Spencer
- Animation by: Jack King
- Production company: Leon Schlesinger Productions
- Distributed by: Warner Bros. Pictures; The Vitaphone Corporation
- Release date: September 23, 1933
- Running time: 6:42
- Country: United States
- Language: English

I've Got to Sing a Torch Song is a 1933 American animated comedy short film directed by Tom Palmer. It is the 28th film in the Merrie Melodies series. The short was released on September 23, 1933. It premiered with I Loved a Woman in theaters.

This short was the first cartoon in the series produced solely by Leon Schlesinger Productions, as well as the first without any involvement by Hugh Harman, Rudolf Ising and Frank Marsales. It is Palmer's only installment in the series as director, as he was fired during production. The cartoon features the song "I've Got To Sing A Torch Song", written by Harry Warren and Al Dubin. "I've Got To Sing A Torch Song" had been recorded by several artists, including Bing Crosby, Rudy Vallée, and Al Bowlly. Dick Powell sang the song in the film Gold Diggers of 1933.

It was later released in Looney Tunes Golden Collection: Volume 5.

== Plot ==
The cartoon is a medley of gags set to the song "I've Got to Sing a Torch Song" and radio broadcasts. Characters, including caricatures of 1930s celebrities like Benito Mussolini and Greta Garbo, are seen in various locations like China, Africa, and New York City. Scenes feature humorous depictions of ethnic stereotypes and celebrity impersonations, including Bing Crosby and James Cagney. The Statue of Liberty sings the title track, ending with a nod to Jimmy Durante. Ed Wynn's running gag with a cannon culminates in a misfire, sending him flying into his home where his family wears firemen hats.
