= Buddy's Show Boat =

1933 film by Earl Duvall

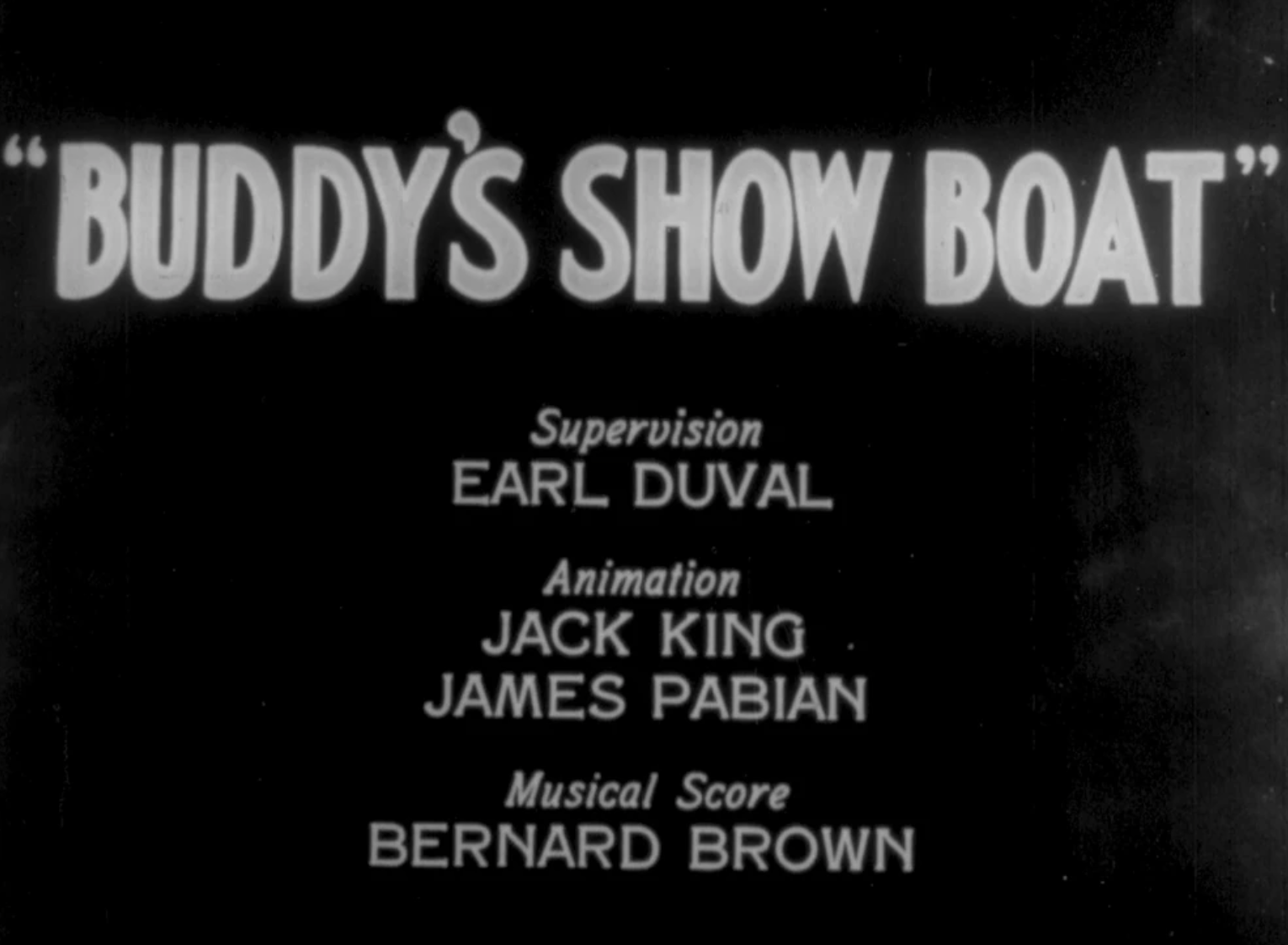
- Title card
- Directed by: Earl Duvall
- Produced by: Leon Schlesinger
- Starring: Bernard Brown; Shirley Reed; Charlie Lung; The Singing Guardsmen
- Music by: Bernard Brown; Norman Spencer
- Animation by: Jack King; James Pabian
- Color process: Black-and-white
- Production company: Leon Schlesinger Productions
- Distributed by: Warner Bros. Pictures; The Vitaphone Corporation
- Release date: December 9, 1933
- Running time: 7 minutes
- Country: United States
- Language: English

Buddy's Show Boat is a 1933 American animated comedy short film directed by Earl Duvall. The short was released on December 9, 1933. It is the 41st film in the Looney Tunes series and the third cartoon to feature Buddy.

== Plot ==
Buddy operates a show boat and fixes one of its horns. Four stereotypical black men shovel coal into the engine, while two sleepy men use sausages on fishing poles to manipulate two dogs to spin a wheel. Cookie peels potatoes for the crew. A brute peels dead skin on his foot and drops them into the water, only to be spat back at by an annoyed fish. A ferry boat passes, and Buddy's vessel drops anchor at a dock near which a parade heralds the boat's coming. Crowds enter the boat.

On board the ship, Cookie prepares herself for a performance and blows a kiss to a picture of Captain Buddy; in the next room, the brute perfumes himself and similarly blows a kiss, but to a picture of Cookie. Buddy calls her and they exchange kisses, which literally travel through the telephone. The brute spies him and does the same, only to be hit by the telephone. Buddy and Cookie perform a sing-and-dance routine, then introduce the performance of a stereotypical African named "Chief Saucer-lip", who impersonates Maurice Chevalier and sings with a kangaroo and her baby at the piano.

Cookie watches from behind the curtain, and the brute easily abducts her with a stage hook; dragging Cookie to the main deck, where Buddy arrives and orders him to unhand Cookie. The brute obliges, but punches Buddy that he flies backward into a device that spins him around and sends him flying into the brute, who then doubles back into an electrical device with catches his rear end and painfully shocks him. He is then knocked backwards with a wooden lifeboat into the cage of Wally the trained walrus, freeing him and causing him to bite, chase the brute and do tricks with him. The brute then fall into a hole and is retrieved with a crane by Buddy, moving him to a wheel which repeatedly hits his buttocks while he celebrates with Cookie and the walrus.

== Reception ==
Motion Picture Herald (February 10, 1934): "An amusing animated cartoon in which Buddy docks his showboat at a Mississippi town. He and Cookie entertain the natives until a rough deck hand captures the girl. Buddy goes into animated action, and hangs the villain over the paddle wheel, with diastrous results. Will fit any spot on the bill."
