= Honeymoon Hotel (1934 film) =

1934 film by Earl Duvall

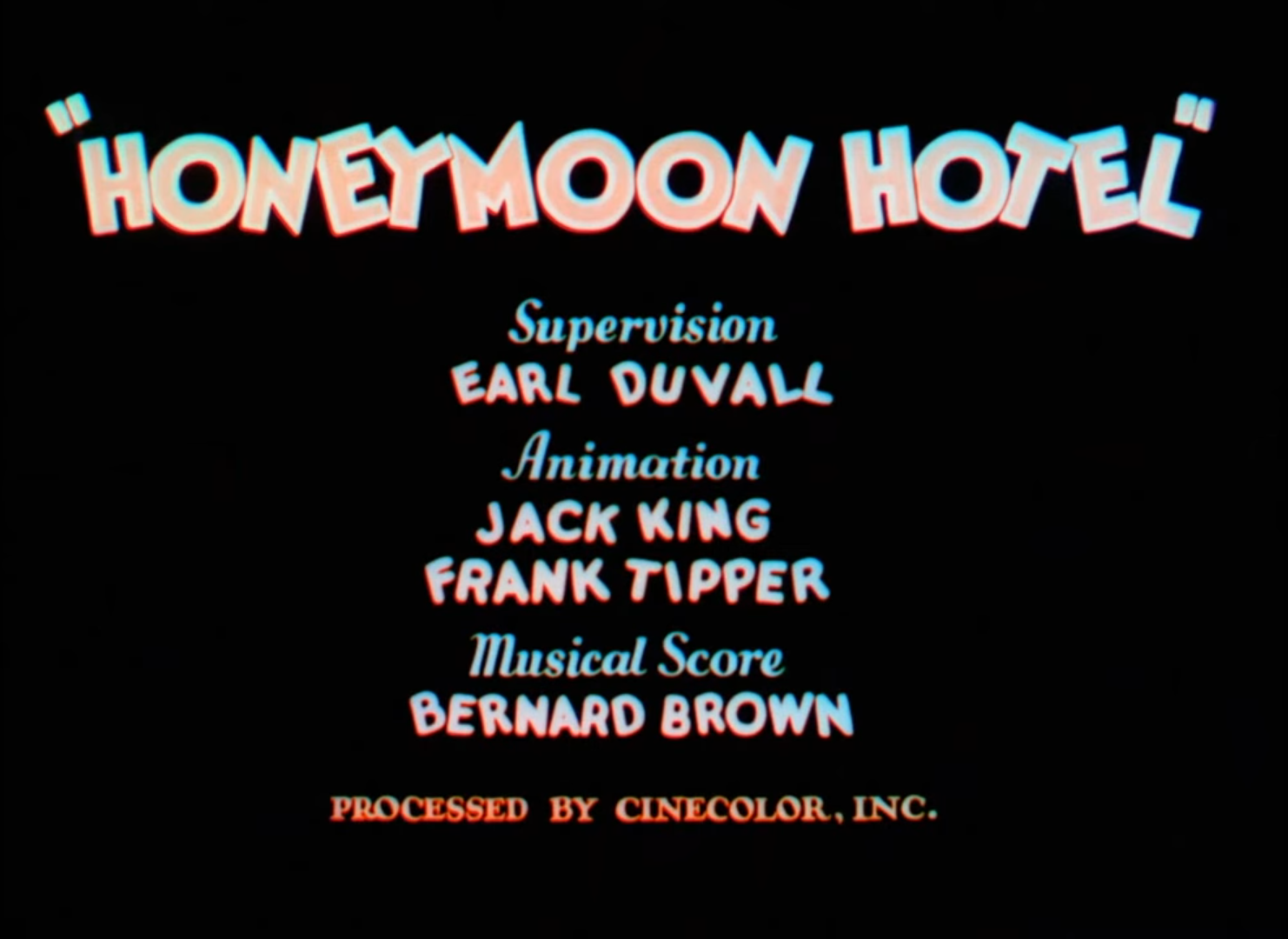
- Title card
- Directed by: Earl Duvall
- Produced by: Leon Schlesinger
- Music by: Bernard B. Brown
- Animation by: Jack King; Frank Tipper
- Color process: Cinecolor
- Production company: Leon Schlesinger Productions
- Distributed by: Warner Bros. Pictures; The Vitaphone Corporation
- Release date: February 17, 1934
- Running time: 7 minutes
- Country: United States
- Language: English

Honeymoon Hotel is a 1934 American animated comedy short film directed by Earl Duvall. The short was released on February 17, 1934. It is the 31st film in the Merrie Melodies series, featuring the titular song from the film Footlight Parade, the first to be released in color via Cinecolor, as well as the last to be directed by Duvall before his firing.

== Plot ==
A group of bugs sing and advertise Bugtown, a bustling town full of insects. A pair of male and female lovebugs row on the water; they later get married and go on their honeymoon at the titular hotel. A gangster bug attempts to peek through the keyhole, but the couple lift the lock out of view for him to his chagrin. He does the same to other rooms, but is spat on, insulted and knocked unconscious by the locks.

The other employees, except for a centipede that the male fly gave gratuity to, bring them free food and alcohol for the sole purpose of easing them into being eavesdropped. The moon constantly attempts to eavesdrop them to their chagrin, but they eventually give up and make out with the lights out.

A fire breaks out in the hotel, summoning the firefighters of Bugtown. The couple are locked in their rooms, but the retractable bed ends up hiding them long enough to allow their survival. As the fire is put out and the hotel is destroyed, the couple obliviously marks "do not disturb" on their door before retracting the bed and having sex.

== Color process ==
The film is notable for being the first Warner Bros. cartoon produced in color. It used Cinecolor since Walt Disney had exclusive rights to the Technicolor process. There was only one other Merrie Melodies cartoon produced in Cinecolor (Beauty and the Beast) before the series went briefly back to black-and-white. Later, the Merrie Melodies moved to Technicolor, though the Looney Tunes continued to be produced in black-and-white until 1943. Cinecolor would make a return in several late 1940s Looney Tunes and Merrie Melodies shorts.

== Home media ==
The film is available on the Looney Tunes Collector's Choice: Volume 3 Blu-ray.
