= Buddy's Circus =

1934 film directed by Jack King

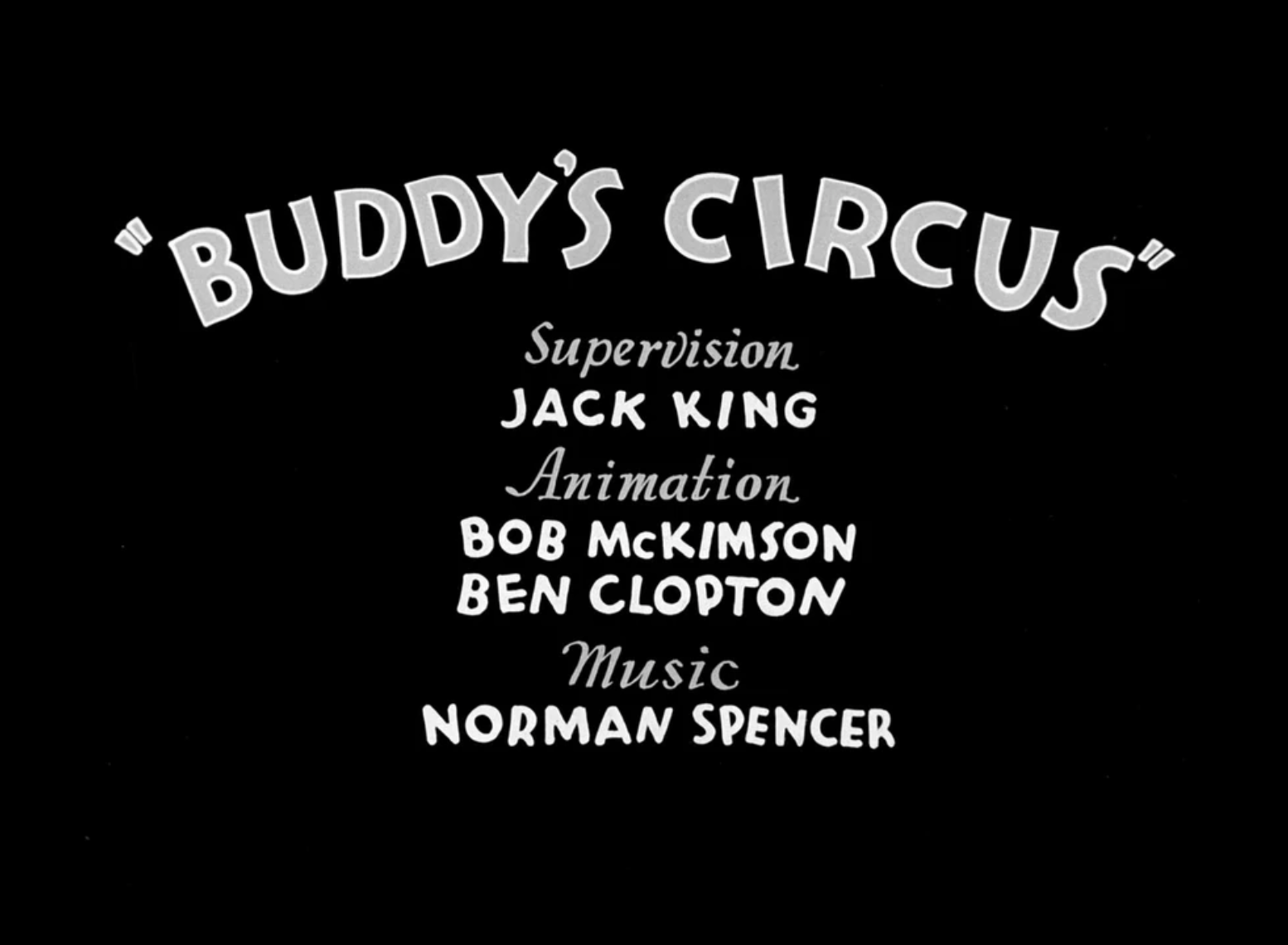
- Title card
- Directed by: Jack King
- Produced by: Leon Schlesinger
- Starring: Jackie Morrow; Jack Carr
- Music by: Norman Spencer
- Animation by: Bob McKimson; Ben Clopton
- Color process: Black and white
- Production company: Leon Schlesinger Productions
- Distributed by: Warner Bros. Productions; The Vitaphone Corporation
- Release date: November 8, 1934
- Running time: 7 minutes
- Country: United States
- Language: English

Buddy's Circus is a 1934 American animated comedy short film directed by Jack King. The short was released on November 8, 1934. It is the 50th film in the Looney Tunes series and the twelfth cartoon to feature Buddy. It was included in Looney Tunes Golden Collection: Volume 6.

== Plot ==
Buddy operates a circus. He flies a hot air balloon with his animals, noticing that it is 2 p.m., so he starts the show by dropping a giant octopus which hammers nails before being flattened by the circus tent. Crowds flock into the tent despite minimal advertising.

Buddy first plays the tusks and tails of his elephants like musical instruments. He then starts a freak show, which begins with three stereotypical Black people, the Ubangi twins, two performers who can play one another as musical instruments, as well as "Oscar the Ubangi-phone", who can play records with his mouth. He also shows off Elastiko the India-Rubber Man, a stereotypical Indian whose body can stretch to great lengths and whose skull can take great punishment, as well as Asbesto the Human Stove, who eats eggs and then, by X-ray, demonstrates his natural ability to cook them within his digestive tract.

Buddy then marches through the circus with animals. A reclining clown smokes while lions jump over smoke rings produced by bouncing on him. One performer is lifted by his teeth with a rope in order to demonstrate his jaw strength, only to struggle and fall, revealing that he wears dentures. An infant is the only patron who enjoys this performance, only to drop his box of Cracker Jack into the stands. To retrieve the box, the infant enters the underside of the seats and swings from patron's leg to patron's leg until he finds the ground, where he reaches for his found Cracker Jack box, all of whose spilled contents then are consumed by an elephant, which then takes the baby onto its trunk.

A trapeze artist performs with an advertisement on his buttocks, wowing people to the point one man is unaware his ice cream is being licked by the man next to him, who then realizes after his finger is licked. The infant clumsily joins in the elephants' dance routine, and is launched throughout the other performers' routines. His mother only realizes after he hangs for dear life on a trapeze artist and causes the trapeze artist below him to drop onto a drum, notifying Buddy. Buddy and the infant's mother then attempt to save him, unintentionally performing a trapeze routine while sabotaging the original routine while trying to save the infant. The infant is launched inside a hippo while Buddy and the infant's mother is thrown out in the process. The infant's mother believes her child to be dead until an attempt by Buddy to wipe her tears leads to the hippo emerging with the infant. The three then celebrate.

== Home media ==
Buddy's Circus is featured on disc three of the Looney Tunes Golden Collection: Volume 6. Along with Buddy's Day Out and Buddy's Beer Garden, it is one of only three Buddy cartoons released on DVD.
