= Edward Bleier =

American television executive (1929–2023)

- Born: October 16, 1929; New York City, U.S.
- Died: October 17, 2023 (aged 94); East Hampton, New York, U.S.
- Education: Syracuse University
- Occupation: Television executive
- Spouse: Magda Palacci (m. 1973)

Edward Bleier (October 16, 1929 – October 17, 2023) was an American television executive. As a president at Warner Bros. Television in the 1980s and 1990s, he played a role in the development of cable television and pay TV. He served on the board of directors of RealNetworks and Blockbuster LLC and as chairman of the board of CKX, Inc., owner of the American Idol and Elvis Presley franchises.

== Early career ==
Born in New York City on October 16, 1929, Bleier's career started in high school on WNEW radio's high school hour and working as a stringer for the Long Island Press and The New York Times. He was an ABC News copy boy during summers while attending Syracuse University. He also wrote for the Syracuse Herald Journal and several Syracuse radio stations. He was a friend of William Safire, and dropped out of college with him in 1949. Bleier began his television career by managing promotion for the DuMont Television Network and New York's Channel 5. He returned to school as an adult to receive his degree in 1994.

== American Broadcasting Company ==
In the early 1950s, he worked in advertising for ABC's New York Channel 7 and was promoted to ABC's Television Network. In the 1960s, Bleier was a senior executive of the American Broadcasting Company, working in daytime and children's programming and sales, general sales management, and marketing, public relations and strategic planning.

His 1967 research and strategic planning for ABC correctly presaged the growth of cable TV. Some other milestones during his time at ABC included the first integration of African-American characters in daytime dramas, helping make women's and children's programming profitable, and managing advertiser support for ABC Sports and ABC News.

Bleier left the network in 1968.

== Warner Bros. Entertainment ==
For Warner Bros. Television, Bleier was President of Domestic Pay TV, Cable & Network Features. As part of this appointment Warner Bros. acquired Bleier's production/ distribution company. He was put in charge of Network Programming and Sales in 1969. He became a Senior Advisor in 2002, and held this position until 2005.

During his 35 years at Warner Bros. he was responsible for annual record-breaking U.S. after-market sales of Warner's TV series and movies, vastly exceeding their theatrical income for the first time. He worked closely with Warner's cable systems, helping develop basic and pay-TV networks (such as MTV, Nickelodeon, and The Movie Channel), pay-per-view, and video-on-demand. He co-created the corporate plan for Warner Home Video and was a pioneer of new digital media markets, particularly to securely deliver content-on-demand via Internet or cable.

Bleier oversaw more than 100 variations of Looney Tunes programming on ten different cable and broadcast networks. He also oversaw combining old and new animation for five movies and 15 TV specials. Warner Animation collaborated with Steven Spielberg on three series: Tiny Toon Adventures, Animaniacs and Pinky and the Brain.

In the mid 1970s, Bleier developed a woman's daytime panel show featuring Julie Nixon Eisenhower, daughter of ex-President Nixon and granddaughter-in-law of Dwight D. Eisenhower. "Ask Julie" never aired.

Bleier helped pave the way for the 1990 Warner merger with Time Inc.

== Other accomplishments ==
Bleier held posts as chairman of the Center for Communication, president of the International Radio & Television Society, vice-chairman of the International Television Council, chairman of the Academy of the Arts of Guild Hall of East Hampton, board member of the Keystone Center for Science and Environment and the Martha Graham Dance Company, and participated in two United Nations World TV Forums. He guest-lectured at 15 different universities. Pro bono activities included serving as steering committee chairman for 13 "Communications Leaders' Conferences" of the Aspen Institute from 1970 to 1999.

In 2003, Bleier published a book titled The Thanksgiving Ceremony through Crown/Random House. The book describes his first-generation celebration of thanksgiving, including an original around-the-table "ceremony" for the Thanksgiving feast. The New York Times columnist William Safire wrote the book's foreword. The Thanksgiving Ceremony jacket received endorsements from Arlene and Alan Alda, Julie Nixon Eisenhower, the late Peter Jennings and his wife, Kayce Freed, Quincy Jones, and Steven Spielberg.

Recipient of the Steven J. Ross Humanitarian Award, he co-chaired the Entertainment/Media & Communications division of the UJA Federation for seven years and later served on the media council of the Paley Center for Media, as a member of the Council on Foreign Relations, and as a trustee of the Charles A. Dana Foundation.

In 2006, the Center for the Study of Popular Television at Syracuse University's S.I. Newhouse School of Public Communications was renamed the Bleier Center for Television and Popular Culture in his honor.

== Personal life and death ==
Bleier was married to French-language journalist, Magda Palacci Bleier, from 1973. A native of New York City, he resided there and in East Hampton, Long Island. He died at his home in East Hampton on October 17, 2023, the day after his 94th birthday.
