= José Santa Cruz (actor) =

Brazilian actor (1929–2024)

- Publicity Photo of José Santa Cruz
- Born: José Santa Cruz Costa; 14 March 1929; Picuí, Brazil
- Died: 26 April 2024 (aged 95); Rio de Janeiro, Brazil
- Occupations: Actor; comedian
- Years active: 1952–2022
- Spouse: Ivane Maria Mendes Santa Cruz (m. 1951)

José Santa Cruz (14 March 1929 – 26 April 2024) was a Brazilian actor and comedian who worked mostly on Zorra Total, a sketch comedy program on Rede Globo. Santa Cruz died on 26 April 2024, at the age of 95.

== Voice acting roles ==
- Danny DeVito
- Dinosaurs — Earl Sinclair, the father
- Harry Potter film series — Rubeus Hagrid (Robbie Coltrane)
- He-Man and the Masters of the Universe — King Randor
- The Transformers (TV series), Transformers: Armada and Transformers (film) — Megatron
- X-Men: Evolution — Magneto
- Toy Story 2 — Stinky Pete
- Ratatouille — Auguste Gusteau
- Troy — Nestor (John Shrapnel)
- The Closer — Clay Johnson (Barry Corbin)
