= Josy Eisenberg =

French television producer and rabbi

- Born: 12 December 1933; Strasbourg, France
- Died: 8 December 2017 (aged 83); Houlbec-Cocherel, Normandy, France
- Occupations: Rabbi, screenwriter
- Awards: Knight of the Legion of Honour, Officer of the National Order of Merit, Commandeur des Arts et des Lettres, Prix de l'Amitié judéo-chrétienne de France

Josy (Yossef) Eisenberg (12 December 1933 – 8 December 2017) was a French television producer and rabbi. A Hasidic Jew of Polish origin (his father Oscar (Ovadia) was a Polish-born rabbi), he produced an animated TV show, À bible ouverte, which has been running on France 2 since the early 1960s. He was also the co-screenwriter of the movie The Adventures of Rabbi Jacob. and wrote a number of different books including Seven Lights: On the Major Jewish Festivals with Adin Steinsaltz and Job ou Dieu dans la tempête with Elie Wiesel.

Rabbi Eisenberg died on 8 December 2017 at 83 years old.

== Biography ==
Josy Eisenberg was born in Strasbourg into a deeply religious family. His father Oskar (Ovadia), a sales representative, emigrated with his family from Kraków in 1895, at the age of four; his mother Gisèle (Gisa, Guitel) Lam also belonged to the strictly observant community.

Having taken refuge in Limoges with his family before the German invasion, Joseph Eisenberg, like most Jews from Strasbourg, was able to cross into Switzerland in 1943, without his parents, and live there until the end of the war.

Josy Eisenberg studied at the Aquiba school, whose director was his cousin Benno Gross, and then at the Fustel-de-Coulanges high school in Strasbourg. After completing his Bachelor degree, he entered the Séminaire Israélite de France (SIF) in Paris at the instigation of Chief Rabbi Henri Schilli and enrolled at the University of Paris Faculty of Humanities. He graduated with a degree in rabbinical studies, a bachelor's degree in history, and a master's degree in arts.

After completing his Military service, he became rabbi for ten years at the synagogue on Rue Sainte-Isaure in Paris, where he created the youth ministry.

He was private secretary to the Chief Rabbi of France, Jacob Kaplan, between 1961 and 1964. In 1962, with the arrival of Jews from Algeria, who often had no community ties in France, he suggested to Chief Rabbi Kaplan that he ask ORTF to create a Television program for Jews, similar to the Catholic and Protestant programs that already existed.
