= Sittin' on a Backyard Fence =

1933 film by Earl Duvall

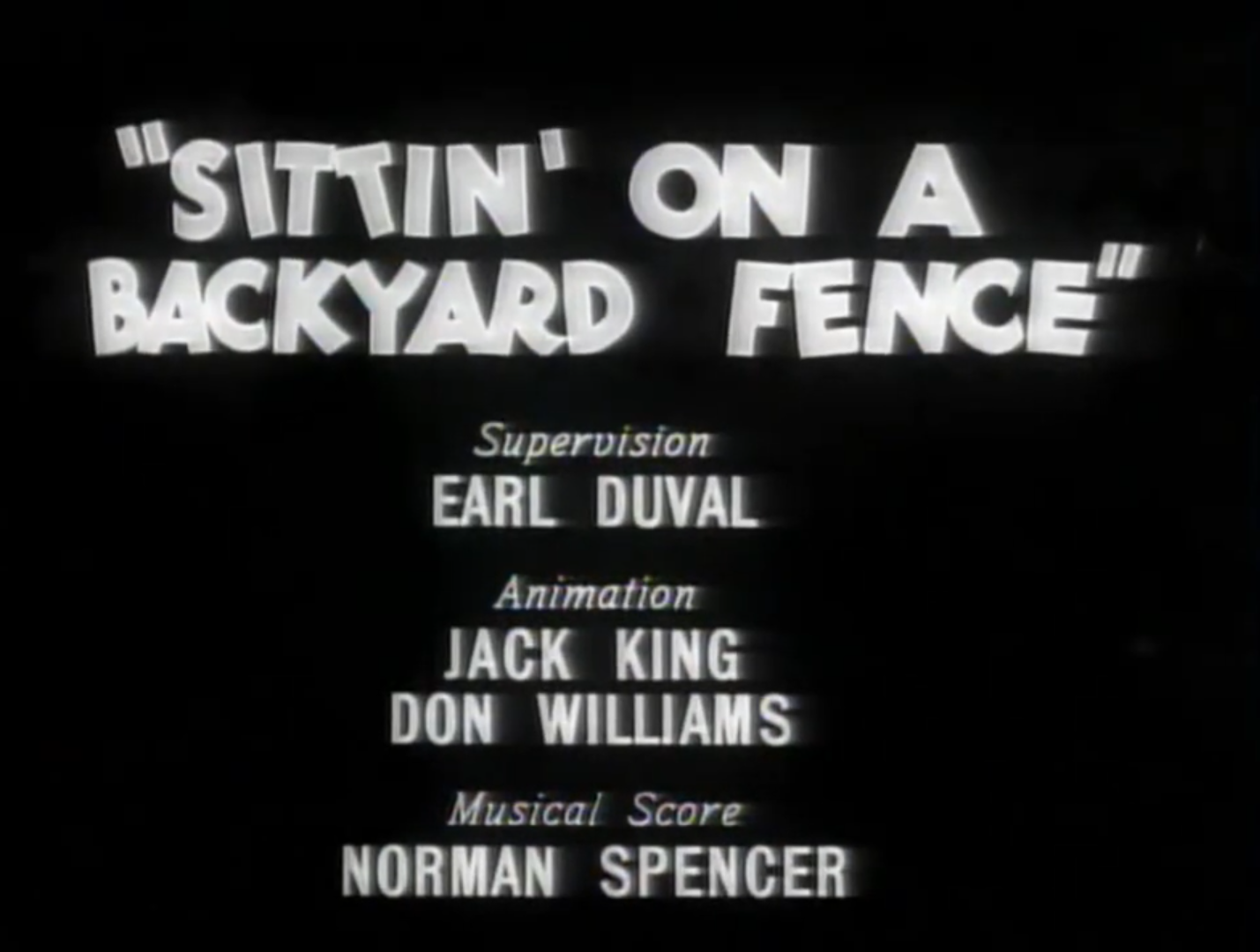
- Title card
- Directed by: Earl Duvall
- Produced by: Leon Schlesinger
- Music by: Norman Spencer
- Animation by: Jack King; Don Williams
- Color process: Black-and-white
- Production company: Leon Schlesinger Productions
- Distributed by: Warner Bros. Pictures; The Vitaphone Corporation
- Release date: December 16, 1933
- Running time: 7 minutes
- Country: United States
- Language: English

Sittin' on a Backyard Fence is a 1933 American animated comedy short film directed by Earl Duvall. It is the 29th film in the Merrie Melodies series, featuring the titular song from the film Footlight Parade. The short was released on December 16, 1933.

== Plot ==
In the middle of the night, a man and the objects in his house sleep while his black cat woos a female cat outside. His companions walk with them to sing the titular song and dance, while uninvolved cats and kittens perform gags. A drunk and half-blind cat then spots the duo and hijacks their routine by wooing the female cat with a record of the titular song. The black cat is angered and retaliates by preparing a brick and throwing it on the drunk cat.

The male cats chase each other until the black cat steps on the drunk cat's tail, after which they spar tails on power lines. A person throws a rolling pin at them, causing them to roll through the power lines and eventually land near a doghouse where they brawl and are chased by a bulldog. After they are knocked out by the bulldog, the female cat passes by with her apparent partner and children who are unaware of her activities, one of which notices them and blows a raspberry. Reaching a mutual understanding that they had been pursuing a gold digger the entire time, they shake hands and collapse out of exhaustion.

== Home media ==
The short was released as an unrestored extra on the Looney Tunes Golden Collection: Volume 6, Disc 3.

== See also ==
- Looney Tunes and Merrie Melodies filmography (1929–1939)
