= Wake Up the Gypsy in Me =

1933 film by Rudolf Ising

- Title card
- Directed by: Rudolf Ising
- Produced by: Hugh Harman; Rudolf Ising; Leon Schlesinger
- Music by: Frank Marsales
- Animation by: Isadore Freleng; Larry Martin
- Color process: Black-and-white
- Production companies: Harman-Ising Productions; Leon Schlesinger Productions
- Distributed by: Warner Bros. Pictures; The Vitaphone Corporation
- Release date: May 13, 1933
- Running time: 7 min
- Country: United States
- Language: English

Wake Up the Gypsy in Me is a 1933 American animated comedy short film directed by Rudolf Ising. It is the 23rd film in the Merrie Melodies series, featuring the title song written by Lew Lehr, Harry Miller and Lew Pollack. The short was released on May 13, 1933.

== Plot ==
Russian Gypsies in a village dance to the titular song, while the music is performed by a band led by a caricature of jazz bandleader Paul Whiteman. A balalaika player uses a live herring to play music for him. Four men gurgle beer to the tune of "The Song of the Volga Boatmen". Another four men try to tow a puppy who refuses to walk. Another four men sing while wearing ushankas which are simply live cats. A girl dances to the tune.

A dwarf disguises himself as a taller figure with three bombs and sneaks into the village, fooling a guard by disguising as a woman. Meanwhile, the mad monk Rice-Puddin' (a caricature of Grigori Rasputin) attempts to solve a jigsaw puzzle of a donkey, but could not find the piece consisting of its tail, so he cuts up a picture of Tsar Nicholas II and uses it instead. He spots the villagers dancing and notices the girl, ordering a guard to abduct her before disposing of him so he can force himself upon her. To his horror, all the villagers immediately revolt and rush to kill him. He rides a donkey to escape; unbeknownst to him, the dwarf placed a bomb in his pants. As he manipulates the donkey to fly like a helicopter and escape, he notices the bomb which explodes and leaving him naked.
