= Betty Boop's Big Boss =

1933 film

- Directed by: Dave Fleischer
- Produced by: Max Fleischer
- Starring: Little Ann Little
- Animation by: Bernard Wolf; David Tendlar
- Color process: Black-and-white
- Production company: Fleischer Studios
- Distributed by: Paramount Pictures
- Release date: June 2, 1933
- Running time: 7 minutes
- Country: United States
- Language: English

Betty Boop's Big Boss is a 1933 Fleischer Studios animated short film starring Betty Boop.

== Plot ==
An anthropomorphic pig puts an ad up for an employment ("Girl Wanted--Top Floor--Female Preferred"), and then walks off with the ladder strolling behind him. Betty walks by and responds to the ad along with an enormous group of fellow applicants. When the interviewing manager asks Betty what she can do, Betty replies in song that she can't type or take dictation, but that she can provide other benefits. The businessman sends the other applicants away via a trap door, and hires Betty.

Betty is happy with her new job, but the boss soon makes unwanted advances toward his employee. Scared, Betty calls for help. The police arrive on the scene, making several futile attempts to enter the building. They finally whittle down the skyscraper by firing machine guns into it. Betty and her boss appear in silhouette behind the window shade, but when the shade is raised, the two are locked in an embrace. Betty exclaims "Fresh!" and pulls the shade back down for some privacy.
