= Pettin' in the Park (film) =

1934 film by Bernard Brown

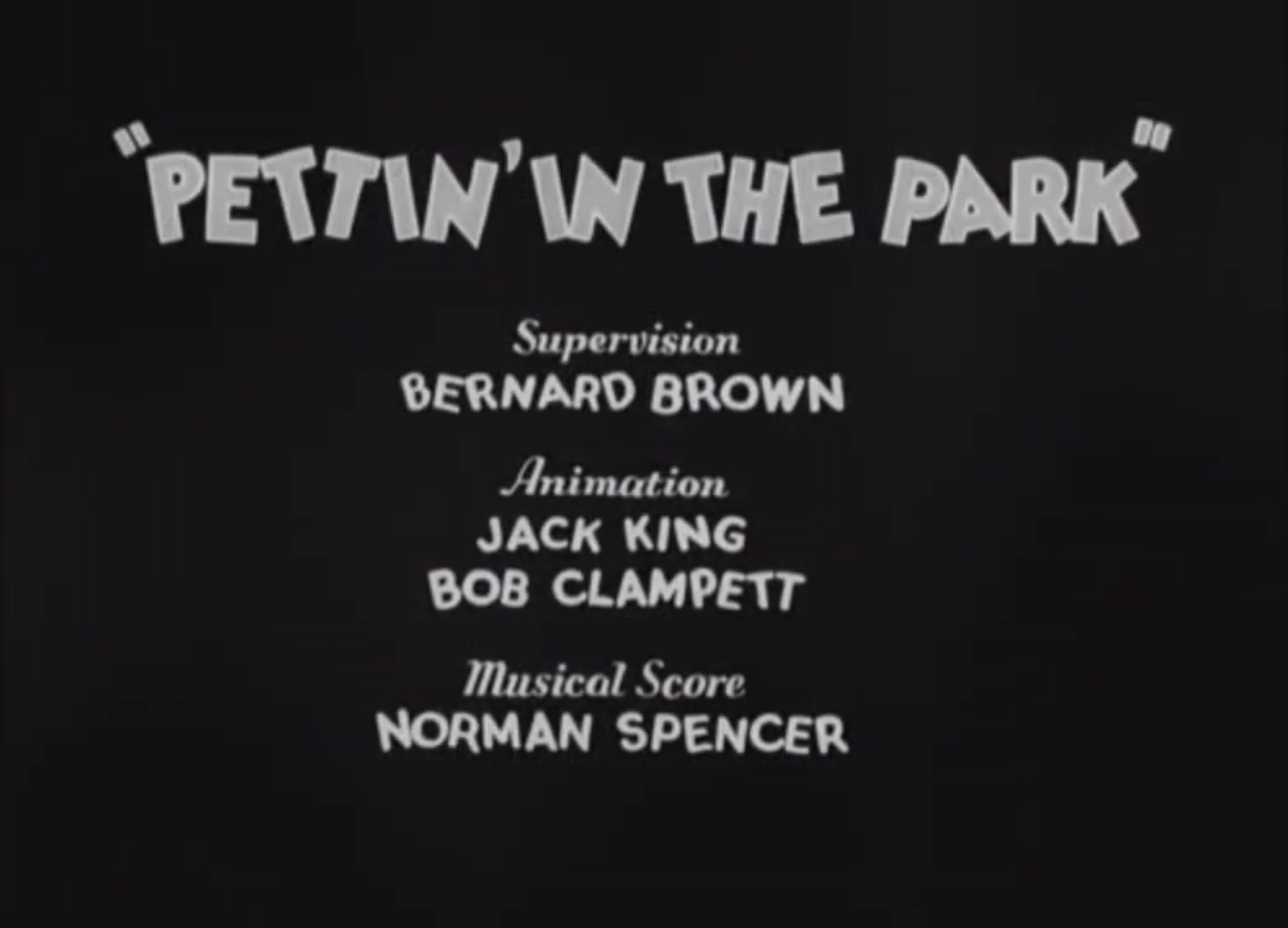
- Title card
- Directed by: Bernard Brown
- Produced by: Leon Schlesinger
- Starring: The Rhythmettes; The Varsity Three; Bernard Brown
- Music by: Norman Spencer
- Animation by: Jack King; Bob Clampett
- Color process: Black-and-white
- Production company: Leon Schlesinger Productions
- Distributed by: Warner Bros. Pictures; The Vitaphone Corporation
- Release date: January 27, 1934
- Running time: 7 minutes
- Country: United States
- Language: English

Pettin' in the Park is a 1934 American animated comedy short film directed by Bernard Brown. It is the 30th film in the Merrie Melodies series, featuring the titular song from the film Gold Diggers of 1933. The short was released on January 27, 1934. It is the first film to credit Bob Clampett as an animator.

== Plot ==
At a city park, various birds profess their love to their loved ones. A policeman flirts with a nanny, to the annoyance of the baby she is handling. A penguin chases a butterfly, only to inadvertently hit the nanny's buttocks, causing her to believe the policeman sexually assaulted her and leaves angrily, only to then flirt with another man in a car. The policeman chases her and is knocked out by the other man.

Meanwhile, the birds hold a swimming contest. They first dive and are ranked based on how graceful their dives are; a heron lands in a garbage can while an ostrich lands in a tar pit. The penguin helps kickstart the swimming race, where outside of a pelican, no one actually swims and takes shortcuts such as walking with long feet, biking in the water or rowing boats. The penguin and parrot find an abandoned bathtub and use it as well as a balloon pump to speed through the competition; the birds taking shortcuts are then punished by environmental obstacles. The penguin sprays three swans with mud to their chagrin, only escaping the chase by exploiting a turnstile to maul the feathers off the swans.
