= Going to Blazes =

1933 film

- Directed by: Walter Lantz; Bill Nolan
- Music by: James Dietrich
- Animation by: Ray Abrams; Fred Avery; Cecil Surry; Jack Carr; Don Williams
- Color process: Black and white
- Production company: Walter Lantz Productions
- Distributed by: Universal Pictures
- Release date: April 10, 1933
- Running time: 7:38
- Language: English

Going to Blazes is a 1933 short animated film and one of many starring Oswald the Lucky Rabbit. The film is the 70th Oswald short by Walter Lantz Productions and the 122nd in the entire series.

== Plot ==
The boy beagle is running on the street until he sees a firewoman dancing in front of the fire station. Believing the firewoman has mental issues, the boy beagle tries to assault her with an axe. The boy beagle misses and hits a firehose instead. Oswald, who is the firechief, learns of the problem and fixes the hose. Oswald then decides to discipline the boy beagle by giving slaps to the little dog's rear. Before the firechief could land a hand, they receive a distress call.

Oswald and the firewoman set off and bring along their fire apparatus, but the latter falls into a manhole along with the firewoman. Oswald, who is on the surface, then settles for a horse and handful of equipment. Meanwhile, the boy beagle follows their trail.

At the scene of the incident, a condominium is up in smoke. Oswald sprays water at the building but the flames appear immune. One of the condominium's inhabitants is a hefty hog who manages to escape. The other inhabitant is the girl beagle who finds it difficult to get out. Oswald moves on a clothesline to enter a window of the condo. Oswald is able to evade the flames and assists the girl beagle out of the building. Oswald and the girl beagle find themselves landing on a garment on the clothesline. Momentarily the pesky boy beagle shows up just to fiddle with the garment, causing it to fall. Luckily, the garment grabs another one which work like a parachute. Oswald and the girl beagle land safely on the ground where they celebrate with a kiss.
