= Yanky Clippers =

1929 film by Walter Lantz and Tom Palmer

- Title card
- Directed by: Walter Lantz; Tom Palmer
- Produced by: George Winkler
- Animation by: Walter Lantz; Tom Palmer
- Color process: Black and white
- Production company: Winkler Pictures
- Distributed by: Universal Pictures
- Release date: January 21, 1929
- Running time: 5 minutes
- Country: United States
- Language: English

Yanky Clippers is a 1929 American animated short film directed by Walter Lantz and Tom Palmer. It is the last silent film to star Oswald the Lucky Rabbit, as the success of series creator Walt Disney's Mickey Mouse series led to Winkler pivoting to sound cartoons. It is among the few Oswald shorts produced after Walt Disney's departure and before Universal Pictures founded their own studio known to still exist.

== Plot ==
Full short

Oswald is a hair stylist and runs a barber shop. His first customer is a shaggy terrier and Oswald goes to give it a haircut. Every time Oswald shaves some hair from the terrier's back, the hairs keep growing. In due course, Oswald finds out that the little dog is drinking a bottle of hair-growing liquid while he shaves. He then takes away the bottle and continues working. Though all he intended to is to give the terrier a little trimming, Oswald makes the dog almost completely hairless.

His second customer is a hippo who comes to have some chin shaving which Oswald provides easily. The next patron is an elephant who seems to need a trunk makeover. Oswald irons the elephant's trunk and curls it with some tongs. The elephant blows its trunk like a party horn and appears to be satisfied by it.

Oswald then comes to a bear named Pete who had arrived to have a manicure. To make himself more charming, Oswald puts on a skirt and some lipstick. He then smoothens Pete's sharp claws with an automatic nail-filing wheel. Because of the feminine outfit the rabbit is wearing, the bear thinks Oswald is a girl and falls in love with him. Oswald is asked by the love-stricken bear to have a ride in the latter's car but Oswald declines. To make the rabbit get in, Pete lures Oswald using a lollipop. The plan works and Oswald is in the vehicle sitting beside his client.

They set off in the car, leaving the barber shop and exiting the city. While they ride through an open field minutes later, Pete picks up Oswald with two hands and starts kissing the rabbit constantly much to Oswald's dismay. Oswald gets out of the bear's grasp and jumps off the car. Oswald goes on running with Pete in the car chasing.

The chase continues even when night falls. It ends when they reach a long fence. Having enough of the bear's affection, Oswald confesses he is actually a guy as he takes off his skirt and wipes off the lipstick. Pete is disgusted and drives away, while Oswald is finally left in peace.

== See also ==
- Oswald the Lucky Rabbit filmography
