= Oil's Well (film) =

1929 film

- Title card
- Directed by: Walter Lantz
- Story by: Walter Lantz; Bill Nolan
- Produced by: Walter Lantz
- Starring: Bill Nolan
- Music by: Bert Fiske
- Animation by: Walter Lantz; Bill Nolan; Tom Palmer
- Color process: Black and white
- Production company: Walter Lantz Productions
- Distributed by: Universal Pictures
- Release date: September 16, 1929
- Running time: 6:40
- Language: English

Oil's Well is a 1929 short animated film starring Oswald the Lucky Rabbit and produced by Walter Lantz Productions. It is the 2nd Lantz Oswald film and the 54th in the entire series.

== Plot ==
The short

Oswald and Sadie (here named Kitty) are canoeing in a river. While the rabbit rows, Kitty plays a guitar and dances. One day, their ride is roughen by rocks protruding from the water, causing Oswald to lose his oar, and Kitty to lose her guitar. They are, however, able to make it safely to shore. Oswald then converts their boat into a car where they begin moving by road.

After such a trip, Oswald takes Kitty home which is a tall condo building. Before Kitty goes inside, Oswald asks Kitty if they should be married to each other as well as having a dozen children. Kitty considers this a possibility and agrees with Oswald.

It then turns out that Kitty also has a romantic relationship with a bloodhound who comes out of the condo. The bloodhound angrily kicks Oswald away and takes Kitty inside, much to the rabbit's surprise.

Still willing to pursue his dreams with Kitty, Oswald elevates the carriage of his car above its chassis. He then moves the car to a condo window of a certain floor and attempts to serenade Kitty with a trombone. Oswald's musical play prevails as Kitty shows up from the window. Suddenly, Kitty is pulled back by the bloodhound who appears and attempts to punch him away. In response to this, Oswald pushes the grumpy dog back and picks up Kitty using the slide of his instrument. Oswald and the cat then make a getaway in the car.

Hating to lose Kitty, the bloodhound decides to use a passing stork who had come to deliver a newborn puppy, taking the place of the baby to use the stork for a ride. He carries a rifle and goes forth to chase and shoot Oswald.

Oswald and Kitty are still in their car with the carriage still elevated several feet above the ground. The bloodhound opens fire and Oswald tries to cover himself using the trombone. The bloodhound soon runs out of ammunition and instead uses the stork itself as an egg gun. He subsequently retrieves a large cannonball from his pocket and comically shoots the oversized projectile from his rifle. Oswald catches it with his trombone and shoots it back, hitting the bloodhound, with a large, balloon-like bump on his head resulting from the injury. In a last-ditch effort, the bloodhound shoves the stork into his gun and shoots, the stork swallows Oswald's car, causing Oswald and Kitty to fall to the ground as they attempt to ride the car-shaped stork. The bloodhound blows his nose to deflate the bump on his head, causing him to come down.

As Oswald attempts to escape on the stork, the bloodhound jumps down and prompts him to stop. The bloodhound then puts a tombstone, designated for Oswald, on the ground, and forces the rabbit to dig a grave. Oswald reluctantly picks up a shovel and digs. To their surprise, a fountain of oil started shooting upward from where Oswald was digging. In this, Oswald and the bloodhound gave up their rivalry and became good friends. They and the cat became rich and happy. Oswald, Kitty and the cat dance from side-to-side on the Universal text in the Universal logo as the cartoon ends.

== See also ==
- Oswald the Lucky Rabbit filmography
