= Maya Buzinova =

Russian animator (1929–2022)

Maya Nikolayevna Buzinova (Майя Николаевна Бузинова; 23 July 1929 – 30 January 2022) was a Russian animator.

She was born on 23 July 1929 in Oryol, but soon the family moved to Mtsensk. Having lost her father at the very beginning of World War II (died under a locomotive), the family until August 1943 had to live in the territory occupied by the Germans. Maya went to school in the village of Pakhomovo, near Oryol.

From 1947 to 1954, she studied in Moscow at the painting department of the M. I. Kalinin Art and Industrial School. After graduation, she was engaged in the design of exhibitions, and then, on the advice of friends, she came to Soyuzmultfilm, where the artist Vladimir Pekar was setting up courses in animation. As a result, since 1956, she worked at a film studio, first on cartoons, and a couple of years later, at the invitation of the director of the puppet association, Joseph Boyarsky, she switched to puppet animation.

In 1977, striving for their own vision of a puppet film, together with their husband Joseph Douksha, they moved to the Multtelefilm studio in TO Ekran, where in 1978 they made their debut as directors of the cartoon "The Postman's Tale". Until 1992, they continued to collaborate on puppet animation.

Buzinova died on 30 January 2022, at the age of 92.

== Awards ==
- 1978 — Second prize, 1st Moscow Festival of Young Cinematographers, for «Почтарская сказка» (“The Postman's Tale”)
- 1979 — First prize, International Festival of Animation Film (Международният Фестивал на Анимационния Филм) in Tampere, Finland, for «Дядюшка Ау» (“Uncle Au”)
- 2011 — Gratitude from the Ministry of Culture of the Russian Federation "for her great contribution to Russian animation, many years of fruitful work and in recognition of the 100th anniversary of animated cinema"

== Sources ==
- S. I. Yutkevich; Yu. S. Afanasyev; V. E. Baskakov; I. V. Weisfeld, eds. (1987). "Кино (Movie)". Энциклопедический словарь [Encyclopedic Dictionary] (in Russian). Moscow: Soviet Encyclopedia.
- Kapkov, S. V., ed. (2006). Энциклопедия отечественной мультипликации [Encyclopedia of Russian Animation] (in Russian). Moscow: Algorithm.
