= Jacqueline Cohen =

French dubbing actress (1933–2025)

- Born: Jacqueline Czernow; 4 November 1933; Paris, France
- Died: 3 November 2025 (aged 91)
- Education: McGill University (BFA)
- Occupation: Dubbing actress

Jacqueline Cohen (French: [ʒaklin kɔɛn]; née Czernow; 4 November 1933 – 3 November 2025) was a French dubbing actress.

Her father, Michel Czernow, was deported to Auschwitz as she fled to Montreal with her mother. After her studies at McGill University, she began to work in dubbing and translation, notably on many Woody Allen films.

Cohen died on 3 November 2025, one day short of her 92nd birthday.
