= James H. Rosenfield =

American television executive (1929–2026)

- Born: July 18, 1929; Boston, Massachusetts, U.S.
- Died: September 26, 2026 (aged 97); New York, U.S.
- Education: Dartmouth College
- Occupation: Television executive
- Spouse: Nancy Stenbuck (predeceased)
- Partner: Charlotte Rosenblatt

James H. Rosenfield (July 18, 1929 – September 26, 2026) was an American television executive.

== Early life and career ==
Rosenfield was born in Boston, Massachusetts, on July 18, 1929. He attended and graduated from Roxbury Latin School. After graduating, he attended Dartmouth College, earning his degree in 1952. During his college years, he was a DJ for his own radio program Rhodes Record Rack. He served in the armed forces.

He briefly worked for NBC, and then worked for CBS, where he oversaw sales relationship with Grey Advertising. During his time at CBS, he served as president of the television network, and was vice president of the network's broadcast group. As president, the network produced the television programs All in the Family, 60 Minutes and M*A*S*H.

== Personal life and death ==
Rosenfield was married to Nancy Stenbuck until her death, after whom he became the partner of Charlotte Rosenblatt. Their relationship lasted until his death in 2026.

Rosenfield died in New York on September 26, 2026, at the age of 97.
