= Tom Palmer (animator) =

American animator (1902–1972)

- Born: Antonio Giuseppe Alfonso Pipolo; June 30, 1902; New York City, U.S.
- Died: November 21, 1972 (aged 70)
- Occupation: Animator

Thomas Augustin Palmer (né Antonio Giuseppe Alfonso Pipolo; June 30, 1902 – November 21, 1972) was an Italian-American animator, cartoon director, and U.S. training film supervisor. He was active in the animation industry throughout the 1920s and 1930s and was best known for his animation work at Walt Disney Productions. He spent a good chunk of his later career directing training films for the United States Army.

== Career ==
=== Early career ===
Palmer was born in New York City with the surname of "Pipolo", but later changed his name to Palmer. One of his brothers, Frank Pipolo, was a decorated New York City police officer. Palmer first worked in marine insurance brokerage, but he later started his career in animation working on Mutt and Jeff cartoons for Bud Fisher. He subsequently worked at Winkler Pictures in 1928, where he directed and animated Oswald the Lucky Rabbit cartoons. When Walter Lantz took over the Oswald series in 1929, Palmer left Winkler to join his staff, credited on Lantz's first cartoons with animator Bill Nolan and composer Bert Fiske.

=== Walt Disney Productions ===
By late 1930, Palmer joined the staff Walt Disney Productions at a time when it was expanding operations rapidly, as one of the many ex-New York animators hired by Walt Disney around the departure of Ub Iwerks. He was one of the many key animators on the team, working on several Mickey Mouse and Silly Symphony cartoons from 1930 to 1933. Palmer was reportedly responsible for having influenced Disney to implement the pencil test for unfinished animation as a studio standard, a technique which used a moviola to film and project an animator's rough drawings.

=== Leon Schlesinger Studio ===
By June 1933, Palmer was lured by Leon Schlesinger to serve as the production manager and main director at his newly formed Leon Schlesinger Productions animation studio which made cartoons for Warner Bros. Pictures, along with other ex-Disney animators Jack King, hired as the head animator, Paul Fennell, and Bill Mason, after his former colleagues Hugh Harman and Rudolf Ising cut ties with Schlesinger. According to animation historian Michael Barrier, Schlesinger placed former Disney animators in charge of the studio in hopes of effectively competing with the Disney studio. Barrier credits Palmer with introducing Buddy to serve as the intended replacement to Bosko as the star of the Looney Tunes series. Palmer's only two credited Warner Bros. cartoons were 1933's Buddy's Day Out and I've Got to Sing a Torch Song.

Palmer's approach in directing Buddy's Day Out was reportedly rather loose. In the story conferences which determined the contents of the film, Palmer would suggest adding "a funny piece of business", a visual gag, but only in a broad manner. According to later interviews with Bernard B. Brown and Bob Clampett, Palmer's original version of the film was virtually devoid of gags. The Warner Bros. studio rejected this version and the film had to be reworked extensively. Palmer was fired by Schlesinger after Warner Bros. rejected the cartoons that he had produced. Friz Freleng was called in to rework Palmer's cartoons and ultimately replaced him as the studio's head director. Palmer's initial replacement as director, however, was Earl Duvall.

=== Later career ===
After leaving Warner Bros., Palmer continued directing cartoons at The Van Beuren Corporation along with close friend and ex-Disney director Burt Gillett. He stayed in this position until the studio folded in 1936, and briefly returned to Disney in 1937 where he worked in the animation and story department. Palmer moved to Miami in 1939 to work as an animation director for the feature film Gulliver's Travels (1939) at Fleischer Studios. There he supervised an animation unit with Vincent Fago, Abner Kneitel, Shane Miller, and ex-Disney animators Arnold Gillespie, Nelson Demorest, and Stan Quackenbush.

In 1942, Palmer was inducted into the U.S. Army to function as a project officer of training films. After the war, he co-founded Motion Picture Counsellors, Inc., a company which aimed to consult and serve as public relations for the production of television and motion pictures, along with John W. Butler and director and writer Paul Sloane in late 1945. In 1952, he recalled active duty, where he continued to supervise training films for the Signal Corps Pictorial Center in East Meadow, New York. In 1954, Palmer won first place in the Freedoms Foundation Armed Forces letter contest out of 7,000 written submissions on the topic "What America Means to Me".

== Selected filmography ==
- Ozzie of the Circus (short) (animator; 1929)
- Nutty Notes (short) (animator; 1929)
- Snow Use (short) (animator; 1929)
- Hurdy Gurdy (animator; 1929)
- Permanent Wave (animator; 1929)
- Oil's Well (animator; 1929)
- Alpine Antics (animator and director; 1929)
- Yanky Clippers (animator and director; 1929)
- Kounty Fair (animator; 1930)
- Chilly Con Carmen (animator; 1930)
- Playful Pan (animator; 1930))
- Pioneer Days (animator; 1930)
- The Picnic (animator; 1930)
- The Gorilla Mystery (animator; 1930)
- The Fire Fighters (animator; 1930)
- The Birthday Party (animator; 1931)
- Traffic Troubles (animator; 1931)
- Mother Goose Melodies (animator; 1931)
- The Beach Party (animator; 1931)
- Blue Rhythm (animator; 1931)
- The Klondike Kid (animator; 1932)
- Flowers and Trees (animator; 1932)
- The Whoopee Party (animator; 1932)
- Santa's Workshop (animator; 1932)
- The Mad Doctor (animator; 1933)
- Building a Building (animator; 1933)
- Buddy's Day Out (director; 1933)
- I've Got to Sing a Torch Song (director; 1933)
- A Picnic Panic (director; 1935)
- Felix the Cat and The Goose that Laid the Golden Egg (director; 1936)
- Neptune Nonsense (director; 1936)
- A Waif's Welcome (director; 1936)
- Mickey's Amateurs (animator; 1937)
- Mickey's Trailer (animator; 1938)
- Mickey's Parrot (animator; 1938)
- Gulliver's Travels (animator; 1939)

== Sources ==
- Barrier, Michael (2003), "Warner Bros., 1933-1940", Hollywood Cartoons: American Animation in Its Golden Age, Oxford University Press, ISBN 978-0199839223
