= Permanent Wave (film) =

1929 animated film

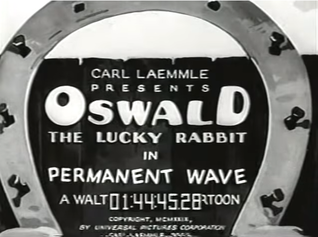
- Title card
- Directed by: Walter Lantz
- Story by: Walter Lantz; Bill Nolan
- Produced by: Walter Lantz
- Starring: Bill Nolan
- Music by: Bert Fiske
- Animation by: Walter Lantz; Bill Nolan; Tom Palmer
- Color process: Black and white
- Production company: Walter Lantz Productions
- Distributed by: Universal Pictures
- Release date: September 29, 1929
- Running time: 6:38
- Language: English

Permanent Wave is a 1929 animated short film which is presented by Carl Laemmle and is produced by Walter Lantz. The film, which was written and animated by Lantz, Bill Nolan and Tom Palmer, features Oswald the Lucky Rabbit rescuing a mermaid, whom he has fallen in love with, from his captain on the ship that Oswald is controlling during the film.

Copyrighted on July 26, 1929, and released on September 29 the same year, the film was released by Universal Pictures, and thus, is part of Universal series of the Oswald the Lucky Rabbit films.

== Plot ==
The short

The film opens with Oswald comically rowing on a whale pulling a boat. This boat has a captain inside, who Oswald is a servant to. The captain, whilst on the ship, begins to feel hungry and whistles a note to Oswald, who is originally sleeping, but is woken up by the music note comically dragging him back to the ship by his nose.

The captain then explains to Oswald that he is hungry, so Oswald agrees to go get him food. Oswald then attempts to bring the captain some soup, but a duck flies onto the plate, eats the soup and becomes obese, which means that the duck cannot fly away. The duck tries though, but nevertheless falls off the plate and onto the floor. Once Oswald realises that the duck ate the soup, he comically squeezes it back into the bowl from the duck. After that, the duck bits on Oswald's tail. This makes the bowl fly into the air and back down onto Oswald's head. The duck laughs and then flies off.

After that, Oswald hears some music coming from the island. Using a bridge made of musical notes, he descends onto the island. This is where he discovers the mermaid. However the captain discovers their presence on the island and attempts to pursue both of them. He manages to capture the mermaid, whom he locks in a room on the boat. Whilst not captured, Oswald manages to get onto the boat, by comically making a water path-way to get onto the boat. After that, a thunderstorm occurs, where the boat is flung around and in one instance, comically spanked by the waves. The storm destroys the boat, as the waves throws the boat away. Oswald and the mermaid find land on a pole, where they passionately kiss. The captain spots them and tries to grab them, but the waves drag him down and he drowns.

== Reception ==
Permanent Wave was well received by the cinema magazines at that time. The Motion Picture News said that the film was a "clever concoctions" and also said the film combined "gags galore" and "expert cartoon work" to "produce the laughs". Variety, in its September issue, said that the film was "worth a filler spot".
