= Hurdy Gurdy (film) =

1929 film by Walter Lantz

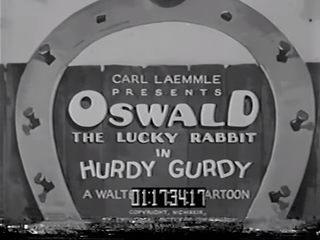
- Title card
- Directed by: Walter Lantz
- Produced by: Walter Lantz
- Animation by: Rollin Hamilton; Bill Nolan; Tom Palmer
- Color process: Black-and-white
- Production company: Universal Pictures
- Distributed by: Universal Pictures
- Release date: November 24, 1929
- Running time: 6 minutes
- Country: United States
- Language: English

Hurdy Gurdy is a 1929 animated short film directed by Walter Lantz. The film, which is animated by Rollin Hamilton, Bill Nolan and Tom Palmer, features Oswald the Lucky Rabbit, who is substituted for the organ grinder's dancer, after the original one is comically swallowed up by Oswald's bubblegum.

Copyrighted on January 3, 1930, but released on November 24 the year prior, the film was released by Universal Pictures. Thus, the film is part of the Universal series of Oswald The Lucky Rabbit films.

== Plot ==
The short

The film opens with Pete (who is the street performer) using a barrel organ (with a mouse and a piano inside of the box), and a monkey dancing to the music made by it. It was interrupted later by the inside as the mouse falls asleep. Pete woke the mouse up by yelling in his ear and the mouse shocked himself as he started playing it professionally. The music and the dancing continue until Oswald throws his bubblegum onto the floor and the monkey steps on it. In an attempt to free himself, the monkey comically gets himself swallowed up by the gum. Pete, who is angered by the events, grabs Oswald and drags him by the neck with a leach through whilst playing the barrel organ. He does this until he descends onto a street with Kitty who is seen using her clothes and her washing line comically like a swing. Kitty thinks positively about the music, who attempts to give money to them. The street performer notices this and asks Oswald to get the money, by using a mouse trap in order to get up to her house. However, when Oswald gets into the house, he and Kitty passionately kiss. Pete, then tries to pull Oswald back with the leach. Oswald frees himself by taking off his head and removing the leach. He places the leach onto one of the legs of a hippopotamus's bathtub. Oswald then blows a raspberry in order to gather the street performer's attention. This angers Pete, who pulls at the leach in order to retrieve Oswald. This sends the hippo's bathtub crashing through the window and hitting the street performer on the ground. This makes the hippo scream and run away with her legs in the bathtub. After that, Pete sees both Oswald and Kitty and scales up a pipe in order to reach them. However, once Pete is on top of the roof and tries to grab Oswald and Kitty, Oswald and Kitty both use a piece of clothing as a parachute, which catches Pete off-guard, and also makes the street performer fall off the building and slam into the ground. After falling, the street performer realizes that Oswald and Kitty are stealing his barrel organ. In response, Pete throws a brick at them both. The brick hits Oswald, who falls off the organ. Pete then throws another brick. Oswald then uses the organ to bat it away, like a baseball bat and does this until one of the bricks hits Pete on the head. This makes Pete hallucinate, with the buildings comically dancing in his hallucination. This goes on until he collapses. Oswald and Kitty both laugh at the events and the film ends with them both kissing.

== Reception ==
Hurdy Gurdy was reviewed by the cinema magazines at that time. The Motion Picture News said that the film includes Good Sound Cartoonantics, and also said that the film developed "some good cartoon stunts".
