= Bernard B. Brown =

American sound engineer and composer

- Born: July 24, 1898; La Farge, Wisconsin, U.S.
- Died: February 20, 1981 (aged 82); Glendale, California, U.S.
- Occupation: Sound engineer
- Years active: 1930-1958

Bernard B. Brown (July 24, 1898 – February 20, 1981) was an American sound engineer and composer, who wrote the scores for many early animated cartoons produced by Leon Schlesinger Productions for distribution by Warner Bros. Pictures. He won an Academy Award in the category Sound Recording and was nominated for seven more in the same category. He was also nominated three times in the category Best Visual Effects. He worked on more than 520 films between 1930 and 1958.

== Composer ==
In 1933, animation producer Leon Schlesinger set up his new animation studio: Leon Schlesinger Productions. The company would later be known as Warner Bros. Cartoons. Schlesinger had to hire new staff for his studio. According to animation historian Michael Barrier, Schlesinger "knew almost nothing about making cartoons" and took help wherever he could find it. Among his new employees was Bernard Brown, who was in charge of recording sound and scores for the studio's films. According to a later interview with Brown, he worked on animated short films in addition to his regular work. This "regular work" was recording film scores for the feature films of Warner Bros. Pictures. Brown would reportedly spend many hours working on the score of a big production, and then return to work on the score of a cartoon.

Barrier credits Brown with having the useful ability to approach people in power ("big shots") with the right mixture of deference and ease. This made these people more comfortable with turning to him for help, even beyond the scope of his nominal expertise. Studio associate Bob Clampett described Brown as having the ability to ooze in any hole that needed filling. Brown was supposedly responsible for Schlesinger hiring two of his friends, animator Tom Palmer and songwriter Norman Spencer.

Tom Palmer was briefly the main director of the studio, but left after completing only two films. His replacement Earl Duvall left after completing only five films. Schlesinger was in need of new directors, and even Brown received credits for directing two Merrie Melodies shorts. According to Barrier, Brown was "no artist" and had no previous experience directing or animating films. The films in question were Pettin' in the Park (1934) and Those Were Wonderful Days (1934).

Bernard Brown and Norman Spencer were responsible for the sound effects and the music of most animated films of the Schlesinger studio for a few years. Brown eventually left, in order to start a new job as head of the sound department at Universal Studios. He was replaced in his responsibilities as sound editor by Treg Brown.

== Selected filmography ==
Brown won an Academy Award and was nominated for seven more in the category Best Sound:

Won

- When Tomorrow Comes (1939)

Nominated (Best Sound)

- That Certain Age (1938)
- Spring Parade (1940)
- Appointment for Love (1941)
- Arabian Nights (1942)
- Phantom of the Opera (1943)
- His Butler's Sister (1943)
- Lady on a Train (1945)

Nominated (Best Visual Effects)

- The Boys from Syracuse (1940)
- The Invisible Man Returns (1940)
- Invisible Agent (1942)

== Sources ==
- Barrier, Michael (2003), "Warner Bros., 1933-1940", Hollywood Cartoons: American Animation in Its Golden Age, Oxford University Press, ISBN 978-0199839223
