= 1932 in film =

The following is an overview of 1932 in film, including significant events, a list of films released and notable births and deaths. In this year, the Puppetoons series of short animated films, Mitternacht, is produced by Hungarian animator George Pal.

== Events ==
- October 1 – Australia produces its first musical film, His Royal Highness
- December 9 – Henri Diamant-Berger's French-language version of Les trois mousquetaires is the first sound adaptation of Dumas's novel.

The Film Daily Yearbook for the United States listed the following as the ten leading headline events of the year.

- Sidney Kent leaves Paramount Pictures and joins Fox Film.
- Merlin H Aylesworth succeeds Hiram S Brown as president of RKO.
- Jesse L. Lasky leaves Paramount and becomes an independent producer for Fox.
- Sam Katz leaves Paramount.
- James R Grainger leaves Fox and is succeeded by John D Clark, formerly of Paramount.
- Publix and Fox decentralization of cinemas.
- New industry program, including standard exhibition contract along lines of 5-5-5, proposed by Motion Picture Theater Owners of America and Allied.
- Joe Brandt retires from Columbia Pictures, joins World-Wide, and later resigns again.
- Two Radio City theaters open, under direction of "Roxy", with coincident acquisition of the Rockefeller interests of 100,000 shares of RKO stock and 100,000 shares of RCA stock.
- Experimentation with exclusive runs.

Other notable events include:

- Disney releases Flowers and Trees, the first cartoon in three-strip Technicolor
- The term "Tollywood" is first used to describe the cinema of West Bengal, based at Tollygunge

== Academy Awards ==
The 5th Academy Awards were conducted by the Academy of Motion Picture Arts and Sciences on November 18, 1932, at a ceremony held at The Ambassador Hotel in Los Angeles, California. The ceremony was hosted by Conrad Nagel. Films screened in Los Angeles between August 1, 1931, and July 31, 1932, were eligible to receive awards.

Major awards:

- Best Picture: Grand Hotel – Metro-Goldwyn-Mayer
- Best Director: Frank Borzage – Bad Girl
- Best Actor: Fredric March – Dr. Jekyll and Mr. Hyde & Wallace Beery – The Champ
- Best Actress: Helen Hayes – The Sin of Madelon Claudet

Note: Prior to 1933 awards were not based on calendar years, which is how there are no Best Actor, Best Actress or Best Director awards for 1932 films. The 1931–32 awards went to 1931 films.

== Top-grossing films (U.S.) ==
The top ten 1932 released films by box office gross in North America are as follows:

Highest-grossing films of 1932
Rank	Title	Distributor	Domestic rentals
1	The Sign of the Cross	Paramount	$2,738,993
2	The Kid from Spain	United Artists	$2,621,000
3	Emma	MGM	$1,409,000
4	Hell Divers	MGM	$1,244,000
5	Grand Hotel	MGM	$1,235,000
6	Prosperity	MGM	$1,166,000
7	Tarzan the Ape Man	MGM	$1,112,000
8	One Hour with You	MGM	$1,100,000
9	Smilin' Through	MGM	$1,004,000
10	A Farewell to Arms	Paramount	$1,000,000

== Top Ten Money Making Stars ==
Exhibitors selected the following as the Top Ten Money Making Stars for 1931–1932 in Quigley Publishing Company's first annual poll.

Rank	Actor/Actress
1.	Marie Dressler
2.	Janet Gaynor
3.	Joan Crawford
4.	Charles Farrell
5.	Greta Garbo
6.	Norma Shearer
7.	Wallace Beery
8.	Clark Gable
9.	Will Rogers
10.	Joe E. Brown

== Notable films ==
United States unless stated

=== # ===
- 20,000 Years in Sing Sing, directed by Michael Curtiz, starring Spencer Tracy and Bette Davis

=== A ===
- The Age of Consent, directed by Gregory La Cava
- Air Mail, directed by John Ford, starring Ralph Bellamy, Gloria Stuart and Pat O'Brien
- American Madness, directed by Frank Capra, starring Walter Huston and Pat O'Brien
- The Animal Kingdom, directed by Edward H. Griffith, starring Ann Harding, Leslie Howard and Myrna Loy
- Anton Spelec, Sharp-Shooter (Anton Špelec, ostrostřelec), directed by Martin Frič – (Czechoslovakia)
- As You Desire Me, directed by George Fitzmaurice, starring Greta Garbo, Melvyn Douglas and Erich von Stroheim
- L'Atlantide, directed by G. W. Pabst, starring Brigitte Helm – (Germany/France)
- Attorney for the Defense, directed by Irving Cummings, starring Edmund Lowe and Evelyn Brent

=== B ===
- Back Street, directed by John M. Stahl, starring Irene Dunne and John Boles
- The Bartered Bride (Die verkaufte Braut), directed by Max Ophüls – (Germany)
- The Beast of the City, directed by Charles Brabin, starring Walter Huston, Jean Harlow and Wallace Ford
- The Big Broadcast, directed by Frank Tuttle, starring Bing Crosby and Leila Hyams
- Big City Blues, directed by Mervyn LeRoy, starring Joan Blondell and Eric Linden
- The Big Stampede, directed by Tenny Wright, starring John Wayne and Noah Beery
- A Bill of Divorcement, directed by George Cukor, starring John Barrymore, Katharine Hepburn and Billie Burke
- Bird of Paradise, directed by King Vidor, starring Dolores del Río and Joel McCrea
- Das blaue Licht (The Blue Light), starring and directed by Leni Riefenstahl – (Germany)
- A Blonde Dream (Ein blonder Traum), directed by Paul Martin, starring Lilian Harvey, Willy Fritsch and Willi Forst – (Germany)
- Blonde Venus, directed by Josef von Sternberg, starring Marlene Dietrich, Herbert Marshall and Cary Grant
- Blondie of the Follies, directed by Edmund Goulding, starring Marion Davies, Robert Montgomery, Billie Dove, and Jimmy Durante
- Boudu Saved from Drowning (Boudu sauvé des eaux), directed by Jean Renoir, starring Michel Simon – (France)
- Broken Lullaby, directed by Ernst Lubitsch, starring Lionel Barrymore
- Business and Pleasure, directed by David Butler, starring Will Rogers

=== C ===
- The Cabin in the Cotton, directed by Michael Curtiz, starring Richard Barthelmess and Bette Davis
- Call Her Savage, directed by John Francis Dillon, starring Clara Bow, Gilbert Roland and Thelma Todd
- Charlie Chan's Chance (lost), directed by John G. Blystone, starring Warner Oland
- Cruiser Emden (Kreuzer Emden), starring and directed by Louis Ralph – (Germany)

=== D ===
- Dance Pretty Lady, directed by Anthony Asquith – (GB)
- Dancers in the Dark, directed by David Burton, starring Miriam Hopkins and Jack Oakie
- The Dark Horse, directed by Alfred E. Green, starring Warren William and Bette Davis
- The Dentist, directed by Leslie Pearce, starring W. C. Fields
- Destry Rides Again, directed by Benjamin Stoloff, starring Tom Mix
- Devil and the Deep, directed by Marion Gering, starring Tallulah Bankhead, Gary Cooper, Charles Laughton and Cary Grant
- Downstairs, directed by Monta Bell, starring John Gilbert

=== E–F ===
- Emma, directed by Clarence Brown, starring Marie Dressler and Myrna Loy
- F.P.1 (F.P.1 antwortet nicht), directed by Karl Hartl – (Germany)
- Faithless, directed by Harry Beaumont, starring Tallulah Bankhead and Robert Montgomery
- Fanny, directed by Marc Allégret, starring Raimu – (France)
- A Farewell to Arms, directed by Frank Borzage, starring Helen Hayes, Gary Cooper and Adolphe Menjou
- Fast Life, directed by Harry A. Pollard, starring William Haines, Madge Evans and Conrad Nagel
- Flesh, directed by John Ford, starring Wallace Beery, Ricardo Cortez and Karen Morley
- Flowers and Trees, a Walt Disney animated short
- Forbidden, directed by Frank Capra, starring Barbara Stanwyck, Adolphe Menjou and Ralph Bellamy
- Freaks, directed by Tod Browning, starring Wallace Ford and Leila Hyams

=== G–H ===
- Goodnight, Vienna, directed by Herbert Wilcox, starring Jack Buchanan and Anna Neagle – (GB)
- Grand Hotel, directed by Edmund Goulding, starring Greta Garbo, John Barrymore, Joan Crawford, Wallace Beery, Lionel Barrymore and Lewis Stone
- Hell Divers, directed by George Hill, starring Wallace Beery, Clark Gable and Conrad Nagel
- Horse Feathers, directed by Norman Z. McLeod, starring the Marx Brothers and Thelma Todd
- Hotel Splendide, directed by Michael Powell – (GB)

=== I ===
- I Am a Fugitive from a Chain Gang, directed by Mervyn LeRoy, starring Paul Muni and Glenda Farrell
- I Was Born, But... (Otona no miru ehon – Umarete wa mita keredo), directed by Yasujirō Ozu – (Japan)
- If I Had a Million, starring Gary Cooper, George Raft, Charles Laughton, Jack Oakie and W. C. Fields
- The Impatient Maiden, directed by James Whale, starring Lew Ayres and Mae Clarke
- Island of Lost Souls, directed by Erle C. Kenton, starring Charles Laughton, Bela Lugosi, Richard Arlen and Leila Hyams, based on the 1896 novel The Island of Dr. Moreau by H. G. Wells
- Ivan – directed by Alexander Dovzhenko – (U.S.S.R.)

=== J–K ===
- Jack's the Boy directed by Walter Forde, starring Jack Hulbert – (GB)
- Jewel Robbery, directed by William Dieterle, starring William Powell and Kay Francis
- The Kid from Spain, directed by Leo McCarey, starring Eddie Cantor
- Kuhle Wampe, oder: Wem gehört die Welt? (Kuhle Wampe, or: Who Owns the World?), directed by Slatan Dudow – (Germany)

=== L ===
- The Last Mile, directed by Samuel Bischoff, starring Preston Foster
- The Last of the Mohicans, 12-part serial directed by Ford Beebe and B. Reeves Eason, starring Harry Carey
- Law and Order, directed by Edward L. Cahn, starring Walter Huston and Harry Carey
- Lord Camber's Ladies, directed by Benn Levy, starring Gerald du Maurier and Gertrude Lawrence – (GB)
- The Local Bad Man, directed by Otto Brower, starring Hoot Gibson
- Love Me Tonight, directed by Rouben Mamoulian, starring Maurice Chevalier, Jeanette MacDonald and Myrna Loy
- The Lucky Number, directed by Anthony Asquith, starring Gordon Harker – (GB)

=== M ===
- The Man Who Played God, directed by John G. Adolfi, starring George Arliss and Bette Davis
- Me and My Gal, directed by Raoul Walsh, starring Spencer Tracy and Joan Bennett
- Merrily We Go to Hell, directed by Dorothy Arzner, starring Sylvia Sidney and Fredric March
- The Midshipmaid, directed by Albert de Courville, starring Jessie Matthews – (GB)
- Million Dollar Legs, directed by Edward F. Cline, starring Jack Oakie and W. C. Fields
- The Missing Rembrandt (lost), directed by Leslie S. Hiscott, starring Arthur Wontner and Ian Fleming – (GB)
- The Most Dangerous Game, directed by Ernest B. Schoedsack and Irving Pichel, starring Joel McCrea, Fay Wray, Leslie Banks and Robert Armstrong
- The Mouthpiece, directed by James Flood and Elliott Nugent, starring Warren William
- Movie Crazy, directed by Clyde Bruckman, starring Harold Lloyd
- Mr. Robinson Crusoe, directed by A. Edward Sutherland, starring Douglas Fairbanks
- The Mummy, directed by Karl Freund, starring Boris Karloff
- Murders in the Rue Morgue, directed by Robert Florey, starring Bela Lugosi and Sidney Fox

=== N–O ===
- Night After Night, directed by Archie Mayo, starring George Raft and Mae West
- Night at the Crossroads (La Nuit du carrefour), directed by Jean Renoir – (France)
- No Man of Her Own, directed by Wesley Ruggles, starring Clark Gable and Carole Lombard
- Odds 777, directed by George Schnéevoigt – (Denmark)
- The Old Dark House, directed by James Whale, starring Boris Karloff, Melvyn Douglas, Gloria Stuart, Charles Laughton and Raymond Massey
- One Hour with You, directed by Ernst Lubitsch, starring Maurice Chevalier and Jeanette MacDonald
- One Way Passage, directed by Tay Garnett, starring William Powell and Kay Francis

=== P ===
- Pack Up Your Troubles, directed by George Marshall and Ray McCarey, starring Laurel and Hardy
- The Passionate Plumber, directed by Edward Sedgwick, starring Buster Keaton and Jimmy Durante
- Payment Deferred, directed by Lothar Mendes, starring Charles Laughton and Maureen O'Sullivan
- The Phantom President, directed by Norman Taurog, starring George M. Cohan, Claudette Colbert and Jimmy Durante
- Polly of the Circus, directed by Alfred Santell, starring Marion Davies and Clark Gable
- Prosperity, directed by Sam Wood, starring Marie Dressler, Polly Moran and Anita Page

=== R ===
- Rain, directed by Lewis Milestone, starring Joan Crawford and Walter Huston
- Rasputin and the Empress, directed by Richard Boleslawski, starring John Barrymore, Ethel Barrymore and Lionel Barrymore
- Rasputin, Demon with Women (Rasputin, Dämon der Frauen), directed by Adolf Trotz, starring Conrad Veidt – (Germany)
- Raid in St. Pauli (Razzia in St. Pauli), directed by Werner Hochbaum – (Germany)
- Red Dust, directed by Victor Fleming, starring Clark Gable, Jean Harlow, Mary Astor and Gene Raymond
- Red-Haired Alibi, directed by Christy Cabanne
- Red-Headed Woman, directed by Jack Conway, starring Jean Harlow, Chester Morris, Lewis Stone, Leila Hyams and Una Merkel
- Rome Express, directed by Walter Forde, starring Esther Ralston and Conrad Veidt – (GB)

=== S ===
- Santa, directed by Antonio Moreno, starring Lupita Tovar – (Mexico)
- Scarface, directed by Howard Hawks, starring Paul Muni, Ann Dvorak, George Raft and Boris Karloff
- Scarlet Dawn, directed by William Dieterle, starring Douglas Fairbanks Jr. and Nancy Carroll
- Shanghai Express, directed by Josef von Sternberg, starring Marlene Dietrich, Clive Brook, Anna May Wong and Warner Oland
- Sherlock Holmes, directed by William K. Howard, starring Clive Brook and Ernest Torrence
- The Sign of Four, directed by Graham Cutts, starring Arthur Wontner and Ian Hunter – (GB)
- The Sign of the Cross, directed by Cecil B. DeMille, starring Fredric March, Claudette Colbert and Charles Laughton
- Silver Dollar, directed by Alfred E. Green, starring Edward G. Robinson and Bebe Daniels
- A Simple Case (Prostoy sloochay), directed by Vsevolod Pudovkin and Mikhail Doller – (USSR)
- Smilin' Through, directed by Sidney Franklin, starring Norma Shearer, Fredric March and Leslie Howard
- Speak Easily, directed by Edward Sedgwick, starring Buster Keaton, Jimmy Durante and Thelma Todd
- Spring Shower (Tavaszi zápor), directed by Pál Fejős – (France/Hungary)
- Strange Interlude, directed by Robert Z. Leonard, starring Norma Shearer and Clark Gable

=== T ===
- Tarzan the Ape Man, directed by W. S. Van Dyke, starring Johnny Weissmuller, Maureen O'Sullivan and Neil Hamilton
- Taxi!, directed by Roy Del Ruth, starring James Cagney and Loretta Young
- They Just Had to Get Married, directed by Edward Ludwig, starring Slim Summerville and ZaSu Pitts
- Thirteen Women, directed by George Archainbaud, starring Irene Dunne, Ricardo Cortez and Myrna Loy
- Three Modern Women (Sāngè Módēng Nǚxìng) (lost), directed by Bu Wancang, starring Ruan Lingyu and Jin Yan – (China)
- Three on a Match, directed by Mervyn LeRoy, starring Joan Blondell, Warren William, Ann Dvorak and Bette Davis
- Tiger Shark, directed by Howard Hawks, starring Edward G. Robinson and Richard Arlen
- Trouble in Paradise, directed by Ernst Lubitsch, starring Miriam Hopkins, Kay Francis and Herbert Marshall
- Two Seconds, directed by Mervyn LeRoy, starring Edward G. Robinson

=== U–V ===
- The Undertaker (Funebrák), directed by Karel Lamač – (Czechoslovakia)
- Unheimliche Geschichten (Uncanny Stories), directed by Richard Oswald, starring Paul Wegener – (Germany)
- Union Depot, directed by Alfred E. Green, starring Douglas Fairbanks Jr. and Joan Blondell
- Vampyr, directed by Carl Theodor Dreyer – (Germany/France)
- Virtue, directed by Edward Buzzell, starring Carole Lombard and Pat O'Brien

=== W–Y ===
- Washington Merry-Go-Round, directed by James Cruze, starring Lee Tracy
- What Price Hollywood?, directed by George Cukor, starring Constance Bennett, Lowell Sherman and Neil Hamilton
- What Scoundrels Men Are! (Gli uomini, che mascalzoni!), directed by Mario Camerini, starring Vittorio De Sica – (Italy)
- White Zombie, directed by Victor Halperin, starring Bela Lugosi
- Wooden Crosses (Les Croix de Bois), directed by Raymond Bernard – (France)
- Young America, directed by Frank Borzage, starring Spencer Tracy and Ralph Bellamy

== 1932 film releases ==
United States unless stated

=== January–March ===
- January 1932
  - January 2
    - Emma
  - January 14
    - Union Depot
  - January 15
    - Forbidden
    - The Local Bad Man
  - January 16
    - Hell Divers
  - January 19
    - Broken Lullaby
  - January 22
    - Charlie Chan's Chance
  - January 23
    - Taxi!
- February 1932
  - February 6
    - The Passionate Plumber
  - February 12
    - Shanghai Express
  - February 13
    - The Beast of the City
  - February 18
    - Law and Order
  - February 20
    - Freaks
    - The Man Who Played God
  - February 21
    - Murders in the Rue Morgue
- March 1932
  - March 1
    - Impatient Maiden
  - March 6
    - Business and Pleasure
  - March 22
    - One Hour with You
    - Tarzan the Ape Man
  - March 24
    - Das blaue Licht (Germany)
  - March 30
    - Santa (Mexico)
    - No Man Of Her Own (1932 film not to be confused with the 1950 film of the same title)

=== April–June ===
- April 1932
  - April 9
    - Scarface
  - April 12
    - Grand Hotel
  - April 13
    - Studenter i Paris
  - April 17
    - Young America
  - April 18
    - Night After Night (France)
- May 1932
  - May 6
    - Vampyr
  - May 7
    - The Mouthpiece
  - May 12
    - The Sign of Four
  - May 14
    - Kuhle Wampe oder: Wem gehört die Welt? (Germany)
  - May 17
    - The Last of the Mohicans
  - May 20
    - Cruiser Emden
    - Raid in St. Pauli
  - May 21
    - Attorney for the Defense
  - May 28
    - As You Desire Me
    - Two Seconds
- June 1932
  - June 2
    - What Price Hollywood?
  - June 3
    - I Was Born, But... (Japan)
  - June 8
    - L'Atlantide (Germany/France)
    - The Dark Horse
  - June 17
    - Is My Face Red?
  - June 25
    - Red-Headed Woman

=== July–September ===
- July 1932
  - July 8
    - Million Dollar Legs
  - July 18
    - Hotel Splendide
  - July 28
    - White Zombie
- August 1932
  - August 4
    - American Madness
    - Back Street
  - August 6
    - Downstairs
  - August 12
    - Devil and the Deep
    - Movie Crazy
  - August 13
    - Jewel Robbery
    - Speak Easily
  - August 17
    - The Last Mile
  - August 18
    - The Bartered Bride (Germany)
    - Love Me Tonight
  - August 19
    - The Age of Consent
    - Horse Feathers
    - Mr. Robinson Crusoe
  - August 20
    - Crooner
- September 1932
  - September 10
    - Big City Blues
  - September 13
    - Bird of Paradise
  - September 16
    - Blonde Venus
    - The Most Dangerous Game
  - September 17
    - Pack Up Your Troubles
  - September 18
    - Off His Base
  - September 22
    - Tiger Shark
  - September 23
    - A Blonde Dream (Ein blonder Traum) (Germany)
    - The Phantom President
  - September 24
    - Smilin' Through
  - September 30
    - A Bill of Divorcement

=== October–December ===
- October 1932
  - October 8
    - The Big Stampede
  - October 12
    - Rain
  - October 14
    - The Big Broadcast
  - October 15
    - Cabin in the Cotton
    - Faithless
    - Thirteen Women
  - October 20
    - The Old Dark House
  - October 21
    - Trouble in Paradise
  - October 22
    - Red Dust
  - October 25
    - Virtue
  - October 28
    - Fanny (France)
    - Lord Camber's Ladies (GB)
  - October 29
    - Three on a Match
  - October 30
    - Night After Night
- November 1932
  - November 1
    - Prosperity
  - November 2
    - Scarlet Dawn
  - November 3
    - Air Mail
  - November 4
    - Odds 777
    - Spring Shower (Hungary/France)
  - November 7
    - Payment Deferred
  - November 8
    - Happy Ever After (UK/Germany)
  - November 10
    - I Am a Fugitive from a Chain Gang
  - November 11
    - Boudu Saved from Drowning
  - November 17
    - The Kid from Spain
  - November 24
    - Call Her Savage
- December 1932
  - December 1
    - Silver Dollar
  - December 2
    - If I Had a Million
  - December 3
    - A Simple Case
    - Me and My Gal
  - December 8
    - A Farewell to Arms
    - Flesh
  - December 16
    - Anton Spelec, Sharp-Shooter (Czechoslovakia)
    - Fast Life
  - December 22
    - The Mummy
    - They Just Had to Get Married
  - December 23
    - Rasputin and the Empress
  - December 24
    - 20,000 Years in Sing Sing
  - December 25
    - The Sign of the Cross
  - December 28
    - The Animal Kingdom
  - December 30
    - No Man of Her Own

== Serials ==
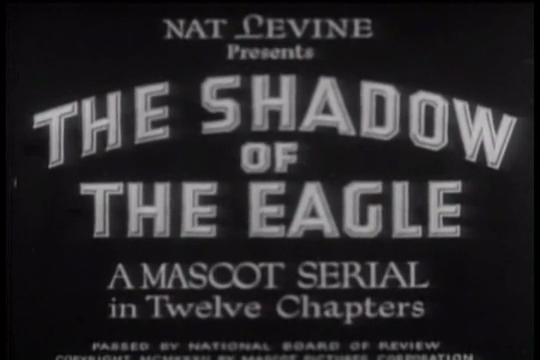
The Shadow of the Eagle poster.

Ordered by release date:

- January 4: Detective Lloyd, 12 chapters (216 min)
- February 1: The Shadow of the Eagle, 12 chapters (218 minutes)
- March 28: The Airmail Mystery, 12 chapters (225 min)
- May 17: The Last of the Mohicans, 12 chapters (231 minutes)
- June 20: Heroes of the West, 12 chapters (225 min)
- August 1: The Hurricane Express, 12 chapters (227 min)
- September 5: The Last Frontier, 12 chapters (213 minutes)
- September 12: Jungle Mystery, 12 chapters (240 min)
- November 1: The Devil Horse, 12 chapters (216 min)
- December 5: The Lost Special, 12 chapters (240 minutes)

== Short film series ==
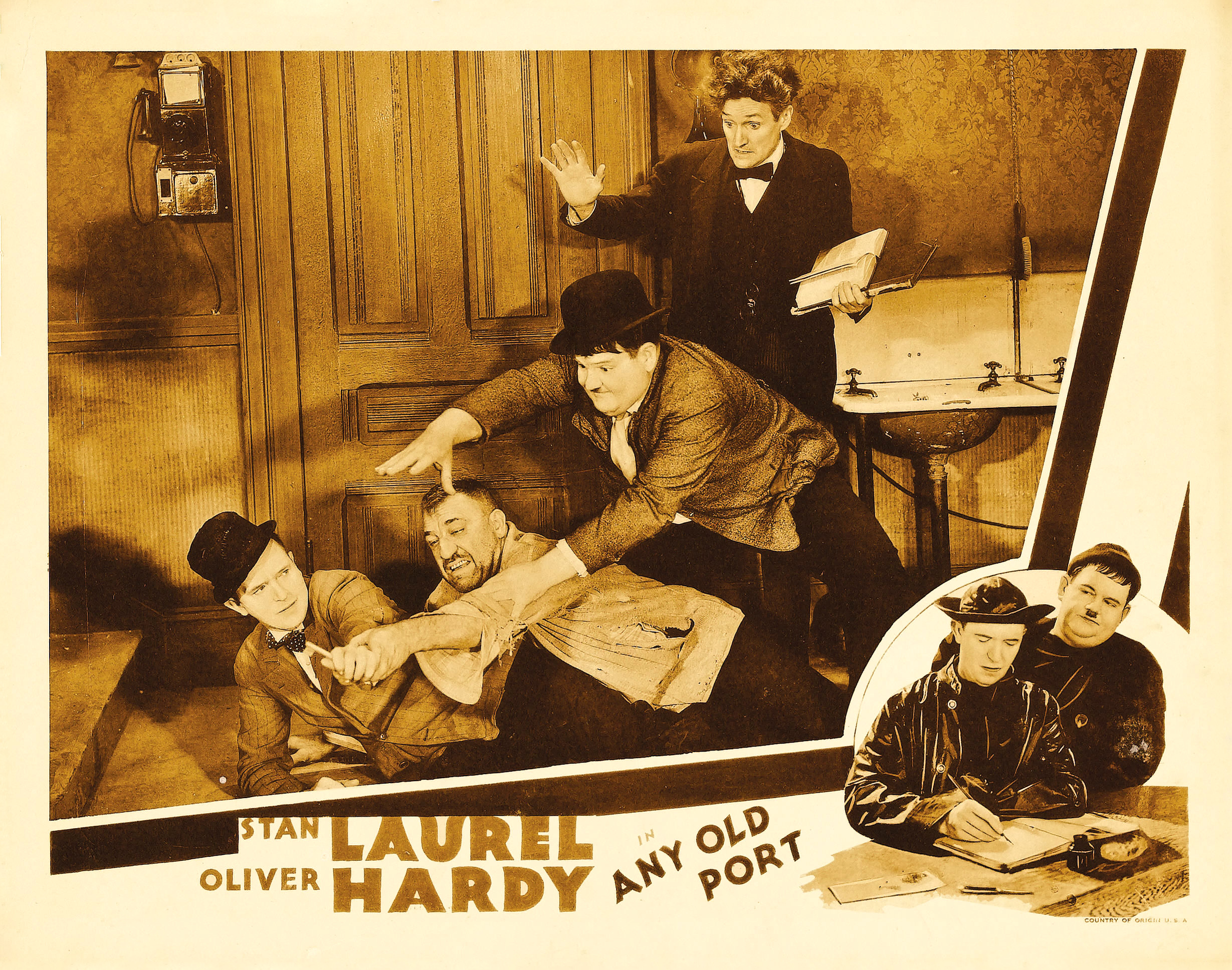
Lobby card for the 1932 Laurel and Hardy short film Any Old Port!.

Ordered by release date:

- Our Gang (1922–1944)
- Laurel and Hardy (1927–1935)
- Baby Burlesks (1932–1934)

== Animated short film series ==
Ordered by release date of the film series. This list only includes shorts released in 1932:

- Aesop's Film Fables (1921–1933)
- Krazy Kat (1925–1940)
- Oswald the Lucky Rabbit (1927–1938)
- Mickey Mouse (1928–1953)
- Silly Symphonies (1929–1939)
  - The Bird Store
  - The Bears and the Bees
  - Just Dogs
  - Flowers and Trees
  - King Neptune
  - Bugs in Love
  - Babes in the Woods
  - Santa's Workshop
- Screen Songs (1929–1938)
  - Sweet Jennie Lee (January 9)
  - Show Me the Way to Go Home (January 30)
  - When the Red, Red Robin Comes Bob, Bob, Bobbin' Along (February 19)
  - Wait Till the Sun Shines, Nellie (March 4)
  - Just One More Chance (April 1)
  - Oh! How I Hate to Get Up in the Morning (April 22)
  - Shine On Harvest Moon (May 6)
  - Let Me Call You Sweetheart (May 20)
  - I Ain't Got Nobody (June 17)
  - You Try Somebody Else (July 29)
  - Rudy Vallee Melodies (August 5)
  - Down Among the Sugar Cane (August 26)
  - Just a Gigolo (September 9)
  - School Days (September 30)
  - Romantic Melodies (October 21)
  - When It's Sleepy Time Down South (November 11)
  - Sing a Song (December 2)
  - Time on My Hands (December 23)
- Talkartoons (1929–1932)
  - Minnie the Moocher (featuring Betty Boop)
  - Sink or Swim S.O.S (featuring Betty Boop)
- Looney Tunes (1930–1969)
  - Bosko's Store
  - Bosko and Honey
  - Bosko the Lumberjack
  - Bosko and Bruno
  - Bosko's Party
- Flip the Frog (1930–1933)
- Terrytoons (1930–1964)
- Merrie Melodies (1931–1969)
- Scrappy (1931–1941)
- Tom and Jerry (Van Beuren) (1931–1933)
- Betty Boop (1932–1939)
  - Stopping the Show
  - Betty Boop's Bizzy Bee
  - Betty Boop, M.D.
  - Betty Boop's Bamboo Isle
  - Betty Boop's Ups and Down
  - Betty Boop for President
  - I'll Be Glad When You're Dead, You Rascal You
  - Betty Boop's Museum
- Pooch the Pup (1932–1933)
  - The Athlete (August 29)
  - The Butcher Boy (September 26)
  - The Crowd Snores (October 24)
  - The Under Dog (November 7)
  - Cats and Dogs (December 5)
- Flowers and Trees (1933)

== Births ==
- January 3 – Dabney Coleman, American actor (died 2024)
- January 4
  - Carlos Saura, Spanish director (died 2023)
  - Richard Stahl, American actor (died 2006)
- January 11 – Alfonso Arau, Mexican filmmaker, actor and singer
- January 13 – Jon Cypher, American actor (died 2026)
- January 19 – Richard Lester, American-born director working in England
- January 22 – Piper Laurie, American actress (died 2023)
- January 23 – James Rado, American actor, playwright, director and composer (died 2022)
- January 24 – Julie Bennett, American actress, realtor and talent agent (died 2020)
- February 3 – Peggy Ann Garner, American actress (died 1984)
- February 6 – François Truffaut, French director (died 1984)
- February 8 – John Williams, American film composer
- February 9 – Roderick Cook, English writer and actor (died 1990)
- February 13
  - Susan Oliver, American actress (died 1990)
  - Barbara Shelley, English actress, "The First Leading Lady of British Horror" (died 2021)
- February 14
  - Harriet Andersson, Swedish actress
  - Alexander Kluge, German director (died 2026)
- February 15 – Troy Kennedy Martin, British screenwriter (died 2009)
- February 18 – Miloš Forman, Czech-born director (died 2018)
- February 23
  - Majel Barrett, American actress (died 2008)
  - Floyd Levine, American actor (died 2025)
- February 24
  - Michel Legrand, French film composer (died 2019)
  - John Vernon, Canadian actor (died 2005)
- February 26 – Michael Goldie, British character actor (died 2013)
- February 27 – Elizabeth Taylor, English-American actress (died 2011)
- February 28 – Francisco Colmenero, Mexican voice actor and voice director
- March 14 – Hiroshi Ōtake, Japanese actor and voice actor (died 2022)
- March 27 – Robert Sacchi, Italian-American character actor (died 2021)
- March 31 – Nagisa Oshima, Japanese director (died 2013)
- April 1 – Debbie Reynolds, American singer, actress and dancer (died 2016)
- April 4
  - Anthony Perkins, American actor (died 1992)
  - Andrei Tarkovsky, Russian director (died 1986)
- April 9 – Jack Smethurst, English actor (died 2022)
- April 10
  - Delphine Seyrig, French actress (died 1990)
  - Omar Sharif, Egyptian actor (died 2015)
- April 11 – Joel Grey, American actor, singer, dancer and director
- April 21 – Elaine May, American comedian, director, screenwriter, playwright and actor
- April 25 – William Roache, English actor
- April 26 – Francis Lai, French film composer (died 2018)
- April 27
  - Anouk Aimée, French actress (died 2024)
  - Casey Kasem, American disc jockey, music historian, radio personality, actor and voice actor (died 2014)
- May 2 – Bruce Glover, American character actor (died 2025)
- May 3 – Robert Osborne, American actor, author, and film historian (died 2017)
- May 9 – Geraldine McEwan, English actress (died 2015)
- May 22 – Seth Sakai, American actor (died 2007)
- May 15 – John Glen, English director and editor
- May 27 – Steve Franken, American actor (died 2012)
- June 3 - Gordon Piper, Australian actor, screenwriter and comedian (died 2004)
- June 6
  - Anne Claire Poirier, Canadian director, producer and screenwriter (died 2026)
  - Billie Whitelaw, English actress (died 2014)
- June 10 – Branko Lustig, Croatian-born producer (died 2019)
- June 11 – Athol Fugard, South African playwright, actor and director (died 2025)
- June 12 – Mae Mercer, American singer and actress (died 2008)
- June 13 – Bob McGrath, American actor, singer and musician (died 2022)
- June 17 – Peter Lupus, American bodybuilder and actor
- June 18
  - David Herriot, Irish actor (died 2000)
  - Sérgio Ricardo, Brazilian director and composer (died 2020)
- June 19
  - Marisa Pavan, Italian actress (died 2023)
  - Anna Maria Pierangeli, Italian actress (died 1971)
- June 22
  - Amrish Puri, Indian actor (died 2005)
  - Prunella Scales, English actress (died 2025)
- June 29 – Soon-Tek Oh, Korean-American actor (died 2018)
- July 1 – Sonny Caldinez, Trinidadian actor, previously professional wrestler (died 2022)
- July 2 – Kenneth McMillan, American actor (died 1989)
- July 6 - Phyllida Law, Scottish actress (died 2026)
- July 10 – Neile Adams, Filipino-American actress, singer and dancer
- July 29 – Mike Hodges, English screenwriter and director (died 2022)
- July 30 – Edd Byrnes, American actor (died 2020)
- July 31 - Ted Cassidy, American actor (died 1979)
- August 1 – Norman Bowler, English actor
- August 2 – Peter O'Toole, Anglo-Irish actor (died 2013)
- August 5 – Ja'Net DuBois, American actress, singer and dancer (Good Times) (died 2020)
- August 7 – Edward Hardwicke, English actor (died 2011)
- August 9 – Denys Hawthorne, Irish actor (died 2009)
- August 10 – Murray Melvin, English actor (died 2023)
- August 15 – Bob Elkins, American character actor (died 2022)
- August 24 – W. Morgan Sheppard, English actor and voice actor (died 2019)
- August 25 – Nun Zairina, Indonesian dancer, actress, dance instructor, and model (died 2017)
- September 3 – Eileen Brennan, American actress (died 2013)
- September 4 – Edward de Souza, British character actor
- September 5 – Carol Lawrence, American actress
- September 12 – Kim Hamilton, American actress (died 2013)
- September 16 – George Chakiris, American actor
- September 21 – Mickey Kuhn, American actor (died 2022)
- September 25 – Brian Murphy, British actor and comedian (died 2025)
- September 26 – Richard Herd, American actor (died 2020)
- September 26 – Yash Chopra, Indian director and producer (died 2012)
- September 29
  - Mehmood Ali, Indian actor, director and producer (died 2004)
  - Robert Benton, American director and screenwriter (died 2025)
- October 4
  - Felicia Farr, American actress and model
  - Edward Judd, British actor (died 2009)
- October 6 – Anna Quayle, English actress (died 2019)
- October 9 - Judy Tyler, American actress (died 1957)
- October 13
  - Dušan Makavejev, Serbian director (died 2019)
  - Liliane Montevecchi, French-Italian actress and singer (died 2018)
- October 20 – William Christopher, American actor (died 2016)
- October 22 – Sheila Allen, English actress (died 2011)
- October 30 – Louis Malle, French director, screenwriter and producer (died 1995)
- November 1 – John Clark, English actor, director and producer (died 2023)
- November 2 – Terry Richards, British actor and stuntman (died 2014)
- November 8 – Nicholas Kepros, American actor (died 2023)
- November 10 – Roy Scheider, American actor (died 2008)
- November 12 – Jerry Douglas, American actor (died 2021)
- November 13
  - Al Mancini, American actor (died 2007)
  - Richard Mulligan, American actor (died 2000)
  - J. A. Preston, American actor
- November 15 – Petula Clark, English singer, actress and film composer
- November 20 – Richard Dawson, English-American actor, comedian and game-show host (died 2012)
- November 22 – Robert Vaughn, American actor (died 2016)
- November 25 – Takayo Fischer, American actress
- December 7 – Ellen Burstyn, American actress
- December 14
  - Henry Blair, American child actor
  - George Furth, American actor (died 2008)
  - Abbe Lane, American singer and actress (died 2026)
- December 19 – Wayne Tippit, American character actor (died 2009)
- December 25 – Mabel King, American actress and singer (died 1999)
- December 26 – Robert V. Barron, American director, producer, screenwriter and actor (died 2000)
- December 28 – Nichelle Nichols, American actress (died 2022)
- December 30 – Macon McCalman, American actor (died 2005)

== Deaths ==
- February 15 – Minnie Maddern Fiske, American stage star, also appeared in silent films (born 1865)
- June 30 – Bruno Kastner, German actor (born 1890)
- July 17 – Rasmus Rasmussen, Norwegian actor (born 1862)
- August 1 – James R. Quirk, American editor and publisher of Photoplay magazine (born 1884)
- August 10 – Rin Tin Tin, canine actor (born 1918)
- September 1 – Guy Oliver, American actor (born 1878)
- September 16 – Peg Entwistle, British-born American actress (born 1908)
- November 27 – Evelyn Preer, American actress, singer (born 1896)

== Film debuts ==
- Conchita Gentil Arcos – Una vida por otra
- Monica Bannister – Hypnotized
- Ingrid Bergman – International Match
- Henry Brandon – The Sign of the Cross
- Peter Brocco – Roar of the Dragon
- Sheila Darcy – Jewel Robbery
- James Ellison – Play Girl
- Anita Farra – Palio
- Betty Furness – Renegades of the West
- Joly Garbi – Social Decay
- Cary Grant – This Is the Night
- Bonita Granville – Westward Passage
- Trude Haefelin – The Bartered Bride
- William Hartnell – Say It with Music
- Grace Hayle – Back Street
- Louis Hayward – Self Made Lady
- Paul Henreid – Baroud
- Katharine Hepburn – A Bill of Divorcement
- Hallene Hill – If I Had a Million
- Rut Holm – The Southsiders
- Isabel Jewell – Blessed Event
- Alan Ladd – Tom Brown of Culver
- Marc Lawrence – If I Had a Million
- Anna Lee – Ebb Tide
- Ruth Lee – The Rich Are Always with Us
- Margaret Lindsay – Okay, America!
- Signe Lundberg-Settergren – International Match
- Eliot Makeham – Rome Express
- Hattie McDaniel – Impatient Maiden
- Iris Meredith – Hat Check Girl
- Inge Meysel – Großstadtnacht
- John Mills – The Midshipmaid
- Anne Nagel – Hypnotized
- David Niven – There Goes the Bride
- George O'Hanlon – The Death Kiss
- Anne O'Neal – Society Girl
- Henry Oscar – After Dark
- Andrea Palma – Girl of the Río
- Germana Paolieri – La Wally
- Jean Parker – Divorce in the Family
- Gail Patrick – If I Had a Million
- Edward Pawley – Thirteen Women
- Dick Powell – Blessed Event
- Tyrone Power – Tom Brown of Culver
- Edith Schultze-Westrum – Kiki
- Mildred Shay – The Age of Consent
- Gloria Stuart – Street of Women
- Lyle Talbot – Miss Pinkerton
- Jessica Tandy – The Indiscretions of Eve
- Shirley Temple – The Red-Haired Alibi
- Sheila Terry – Week-End Marriage
- Helene Thimig – Man Without a Name
- Franchot Tone – The Wiser Sex
- Alice Treff – Peter Voss, Thief of Millions
- Rosa Turich – Beyond the Rockies
- Blanca Vischer – Jewel Robbery
- Irene Ware – Society Girl
- George Wallace – His Royal Highness
- Naunton Wayne – The First Mrs. Fraser
- Jane Withers – Handle with Care
- Jane Wyman – The Kid from Spain

== Bibliography ==
- Finler, Joel Waldo (2003). The Hollywood Story. Wallflower Press. ISBN 978-1-903364-66-6.
