= Diamond Lil (disambiguation) =

Diamond Lil, or "Diamond Tooth Lil", was an early 20th century American popular icon of wealth and libertine burlesque.

Diamond Lil may also refer to:

- Diamond Lil (play), a 1928 Mae West play
- Diamond Lil (Marvel Comics), a fictional mutant in Marvel Comics' Alpha Flight series
- Diamond Lil (GoComics), a comic strip published by GoComics and created by Brett Koth
- Katie Glass, a little person professional wrestler who used the ring name Diamond Lil
- Diamond Lil', the name of a Consolidated B-24 Liberator bomber of World War II
- "Diamond Lil", a song by American guitarist and songwriter David Bromberg
