= Sunny Side Up (1929 film) =

1929 film by David Butler

- Swedish theatrical release poster
- Directed by: David Butler
- Written by: B. G. DeSylva; Lew Brown; Ray Henderson
- Produced by: William Fox
- Starring: Janet Gaynor; Charles Farrell
- Cinematography: Ernest PalmerFox Film CorporationJohn Schmitz
- Edited by: Irene Morra
- Music by: B. G. DeSylva; Lew Brown; Ray Henderson
- Distributed by: Fox Film Corporation
- Release dates: October 3, 1929 (New York City, premiere); December 29, 1929 (US)
- Running time: 121 minutes
- Country: United States
- Language: English
- Box office: $2.19 million (U.S. and Canada rentals)

Sunny Side Up (stylized on-screen as Sunnyside Up) is a 1929 American sound (All-Talking) pre-Code Fox Movietone film starring Janet Gaynor and Charles Farrell, with original songs, story, and dialogue by B. G. DeSylva, Lew Brown and Ray Henderson. The film features a color sequences in the Multicolor process. The romantic comedy/musical premiered on October 3, 1929, at the Gaiety Theatre in New York City. The film was directed by David Butler and has a running time of 121 minutes.

== Plot ==
Sunny Side Up (1929)

The film centres around a Will-they won't-they romance. Wealthy Jack Cromwell from Long Island runs off to New York City on account of his fiancee's relentless flirting. He attends an Independence Day block party where Molly Carr, from Yorkville, Manhattan, falls in love with him. Comic relief is provided by grocer Eric Swenson, above whose shop Molly and her flatmate, Bea Nichols, live. Gaynor performs a singing and dancing version of the song "(Keep Your) Sunny Side Up" for a crowd of her neighbors, complete with top hat and cane.

The film was produced before Hays Code censorship. A dance sequence for the song "Turn on the Heat", including scantily clad and gyrating island women enticing bananas on trees to abruptly grow and stiffen, occurs without Gaynor's participation.

== Cast ==
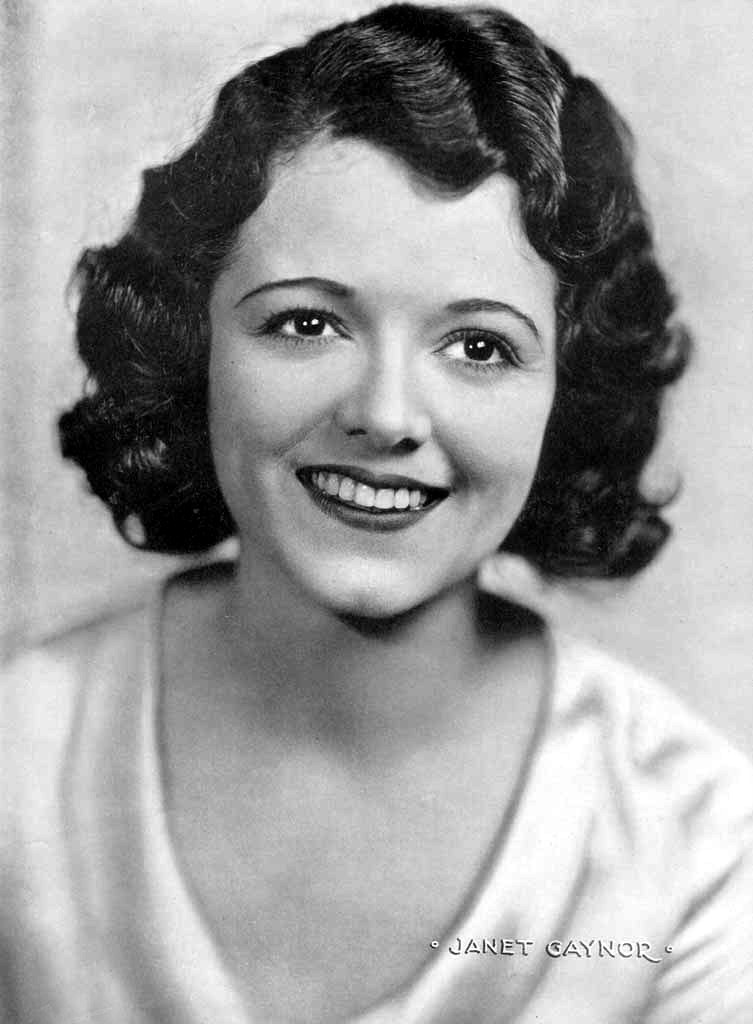
Janet Gaynor

- Janet Gaynor as Molly Carr
- Charles Farrell as Jack Cromwell
- Marjorie White as Bea Nichols
- El Brendel as Eric Swenson
- Frank Richardson as Eddie Rafferty
- Mary Forbes as Mrs. Cromwell
- Peter Gawthorne as Lake
- Sharon Lynn as Jane Worth

== Reception ==
The Times and The New York Times both express the opinion that the film, and the singing voices of Gaynor and Farrell, are all tolerable if not exactly worthy of praise. Despite the sugary sentimentality, the film is engaging, while the cinematography and special effects are impressive.

Footage from Sunny Side Up was included in the comedy film It Came from Hollywood, which parodied B movies.

The film is recognized by American Film Institute in these lists:

- 2006: AFI's Greatest Movie Musicals – Nominated

== Music ==
=== "I'm a Dreamer, Aren't We All?" ===
Written by Buddy DeSylva & Lew Brown (words) and Ray Henderson (music), several times throughout the film Gaynor sings the tune "I'm a Dreamer, Aren't We All?" and, on one occasion, sings it impressively, according to the New York Times.

The song was punned by the Marx Brothers in the film Animal Crackers (1930). Groucho asks his brother to "play the song about Montreal". Chico asks, "Montreal?, and Groucho replies, "I'm a dreamer, Montreal." The pun has been much-recycled not least in Stewart Parker's award-winning play I’m a Dreamer, Montreal.

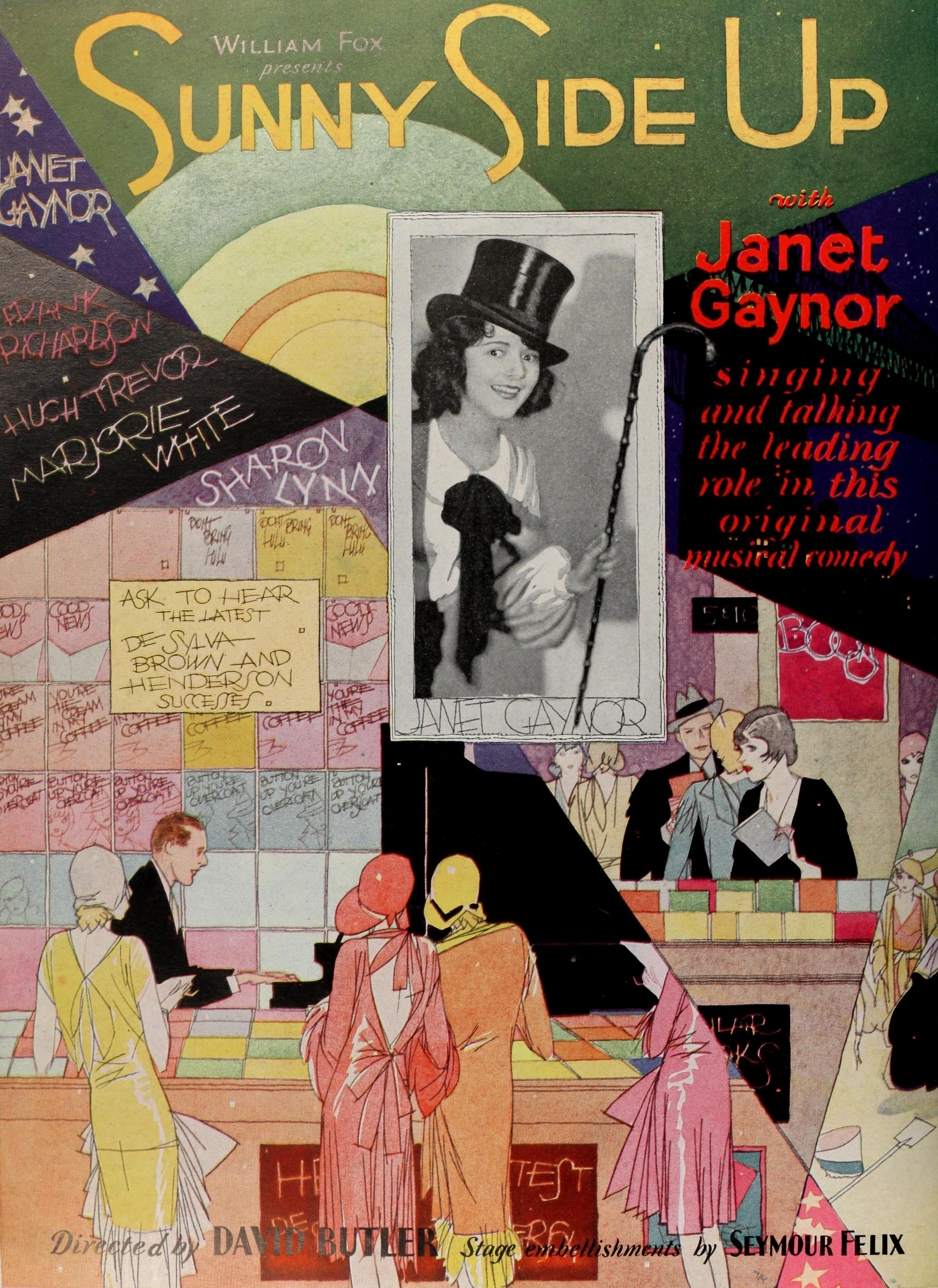
Sunny Side Up ad in The Film Daily, 1929

An early popular recording was by Paul Whiteman and His Orchestra on October 16, 1929 with a vocal group including Bing Crosby and this reached the charts in 1929. The tune was also recorded by John Coltrane in 1958 and included on his album Bahia (1964).

=== "Turn on the Heat" ===
In addition to appearing in the Sunny Side Up, "Turn on the Heat" was recorded as a solo stride piano piece by Fats Waller in 1929, and this recording has been reissued numerous times. The song was also used in the 1933 Pooch the Pup cartoon Hot and Cold.

=== "(Keep Your) Sunny Side Up" ===
Another song in the film that would later be used as the theme song to the 1988 British sitcom Clarence.

In the 1950s, the song was used as the theme song for Sunnyside Up, a variety program produced by HSV-7 (a television station in Melbourne, Australia). The song's melody was later adapted by the Essendon Football Club for its club song, "See the Bombers Fly Up", written by Kevin Andrews in 1959.

A 1929 recording of the song by Johnny Hamp's Kentucky Serenaders plays during the closing credits of the 1973 film Paper Moon.

== See also ==
- List of early color feature films
- List of early sound feature films (1926–1929)
