= The Butcher Boy =

The Butcher Boy may refer to:

- The Butcher Boy (novel), 1992 novel by Patrick McCabe
  - The Butcher Boy (1997 film), film adaptation of the 1992 novel
    - The Butcher Boy (soundtrack), composed by Elliot Goldenthal
- The Butcher Boy (1917 film), debut film of Buster Keaton
- The Butcher Boy (1932 film), second of the thirteen Pooch the Pup cartoons
- Butcher Boy (band), an indie pop band from Glasgow, Scotland
- "The Butcher Boy", a song by Lambchop from the album Nixon
- The Butcher Boy (folk song), an American folk song derived from English balladry
- A character in the novel The BFG
- "The Butcher Boys", a sculpture by artist South African Jane Alexander
