= 1932 in the Soviet Union =

- Decades: 1920s; 1930s; 1940s; 1950s
- See also: History of the Soviet Union; List of years in the Soviet Union

The following lists events that happened during 1932 in the Union of Soviet Socialist Republics.

== Incumbents ==
- General Secretary of the Communist Party of the Soviet Union – Joseph Stalin
- Chairman of the Central Executive Committee of the Congress of Soviets – Mikhail Kalinin
- Chairman of the Council of People's Commissars of the Soviet Union – Vyacheslav Molotov

== Events ==
- Soviet famine of 1932–33

=== January ===
- 21 January – The Soviet–Finnish Non-Aggression Pact is signed.

=== July ===
- 25 July – The Soviet–Polish Non-Aggression Pact is signed.

=== August ===
- 7 August – The Law of Spikelets is enacted.

=== September ===
- 23 September – Ryutin Affair: Martemyan Ryutin and others in the Union of Marxists-Leninists are arrested.

== Births ==
- 3 January – Valentina Gaganova, textile worker and politician (died 2010).
- 4 January – Roman Personov, scientist (died 2002)
- 10 January – Iskra Babich, film director
- 25 January – Nikolay Anikin, skier
- 27 January
  - Rimma Kazakova, poet
  - Boris Shakhlin, Olympic gymnast
- 22 February – Victor Cherkashin, KGB counter-intelligence officer
- 4 April – Andrei Tarkovsky, film director (died 1986)
- 3 May – Maria Itkina, Olympic sprinter (died 2020)
- 15 May – Arkady Volsky, politician
- 6 June – Tamara Novikova, female cyclist
- 13 June – Boris Katalimov, Chess International Master
- 16 June – Alla Osipenko, ballerina (died 2025)
- 20 June – Robert Rozhdestvensky, poet (died 1994)
- 2 August – Vladimir Struzhanov, swimmer
- 20 August – Vasily Aksyonov, novelist
- 18 September – Nikolay Rukavishnikov, cosmonaut
- 16 December – Rodion Shchedrin, composer (died 2025)

== Deaths ==
- 18 January – Dmitry Shcherbachev, general (born 1857)
- 9 November – Nadezhda Alliluyeva, second wife of Joseph Stalin (born 1901)

== See also ==
- 1932 in fine arts of the Soviet Union
- List of Soviet films of 1932
