= Diamond Tooth Lil =

Early 20th century American cultural icon of wealth and libertine burlesque

Diamond Tooth Lil was an American cultural figure popular in the early 20th century as an icon of wealth and libertine burlesque. Several individuals called themselves "Diamond Lil" or "Diamond Tooth", creating an amalgamated legacy clouded by myth. These individuals include a vaudeville entertainer in the Yukon during the 1890s Klondike Gold Rush, a madam in the American West during the early 1900s, and the titular character of Mae West's Diamond Lil, who embodied these traits and popularized the name in the 1920s.

== Overview ==
Multiple women of the American West have used the name "Diamond Tooth" and "Diamond Lil". In the case of the two most prominent, historians have often confused the lives of Honora Ornstein and Evelyn Hildegard, who both went by the name Diamond Lil around the turn of the 20th century, both emigrants from Austria, with similar ages, careers in entertainment, and diamond-inset teeth. They did differ, however, in where they lived: Ornstein in the Klondike and Seattle, and Hildegard in California and Nevada. Lil became known as enigmatic figure, and has been variously attributed as a "dance hall girl, gambler, prostitute, or madam who smoked cigars and carried a gun"—a legacy clouded with myth. By the 1920s, Diamond Tooth Lil was a household name.

== Klondike Lil ==
The first Diamond Tooth Lil was a woman named Honora Ornstein, born in 1882. Details about her early years are unclear and sometimes contradictory. The Master File of the Social Security Death Index gives her birthplace as Austria (then Austria-Hungary). The 1920 United States census gives her birthplace as France. Information about her family's emigration to the United States is also unclear. A 1936 article in The Washington Post stated that she was the daughter of a Jewish family and had formerly been known as Lillian Orinstein. Newspapers in the 1960s reported that she was the daughter of wealthy cattle ranchers from Montana.

Ornstein arrived in the Yukon town of Dawson in 1898 or 1899. She became famous during the Klondike Gold Rush in the Yukon before the turn of the century on the Pantages vaudeville circuit, where she was a star entertainer for the region's spendthrift "sourdough" gold seekers. A nearby gambling house owner said that Lil spent three or four years there. Her stage name, Diamond Tooth Lil, is based on her several diamond-inset dental fillings, including ones in her front and canine teeth. She also collected and wore other diamond-studded jewelry, including a white gold snake bracelet studded with 125 real diamonds that scaled the length of her arm. Around 1908, she had moved to Seattle and was remembered for ostentatiously spending money during a Klondikers' parade. She married Robert Ernst Snelgrove in 1918. It is unclear if they divorced or he died, or when this occurred; she is reported as having married George Miller "later". Shortly before she divorced her last husband around 1928, she lived in an apartment she had purchased in Seattle and inherited $150,000 from her mother, equivalent to $2.81 million in 2025.

Lil made newspaper headlines in 1936 when she was committed to Western State Hospital, a psychiatric hospital in Washington, and reported as near-death. By this time, she had sold the diamonds from her teeth but was thought to still have considerable wealth—only she was unable to speak and her relatives were not in contact. Her reputation limited the market for her jewelry collection, which she struggled to sell in the 1950s. Lil's lawyer reported that her assets had been exhausted by 1961. After spending the remainder of her life in state institutions, Lil died in a Yakima, Washington, nursing home on June 18, 1975. She was buried in a simple grave and had no known relatives. The New York Times remembered Lil as a "dance hall queen" and "the toast of the North".

== Sierra Nevada Lil ==
1943 photo of Evelyn Fialla, the second Diamond Tooth Lil, with an undated photograph of her from her performing days on the right.

Evelyn Fialla was also born in Austria-Hungary, in approximately 1877. (Note: Based on her reported age of 89 at her death in 1967.) Her family emigrated to the United States and settled in Youngstown, Ohio. She met Percy Hildegard when she was fourteen and eloped with him to Chicago, where she became a saloon singer. She divorced him on an unspecified date, and went on to marry several more times over the course of her life. Sources such as Ripley's Believe It Or Not! reported thirteen marriages. Hildegard herself put the number at eight.

As a traveling dancer, she worked her way from Ohio across the West to San Francisco, California. After the 1906 San Francisco earthquake left the city in ruins, Hildegard moved to Goldfield, Nevada, a boomtown of the California Gold Rush. Hildegard was paid handsomely for her exceptionally popular act at the town's Northern Saloon. Though she ultimately spent less than a year in Goldfield, she quickly opened her own dance hall and had a relationship with prospector Diamondfield Jack. Hildegard was said to have won her title of Diamond Tooth Lil in a successful bet with a Reno dentist, who set a diamond in her front tooth.

Lil was said to have entertained and managed multiple profitable brothels across the West, including Death Valley, California, Denver, Colorado, and Boise, Idaho, where her "Star Rooms" in Boise had amenities including steam heating and both hot and cold water. She had reached Boise by the early 1940s. In 1944, she announced that her famous front tooth diamond would be willed to the Idaho Children's Home orphanage upon her death. By 1966, she had sold her jewelry and was penniless in California. She died at the Claremont Sanitarium of Pomona in 1967.

== Mae West ==
Diamond Lil, the successful Broadway play written and acted by Mae West in 1928, is assumed but not confirmed to be based on the Lils' lives. The show was later adapted into the 1933 film She Done Him Wrong. West said that her inspiration for the name likely came from her father's nickname for her mother, "Til", short for "Matilda", and sometimes with her drink of choice, "Champagne Til". West based the character on herself and viewed Lil as an alter ego. "The femme fatale of the Bowery", declared The New York Times of West's Lil in the play's 1949 revival, "bowling her leading men over one by one with her classical impersonation of a storybook strumpet", dressed in "some of the gaudiest finery of the century" with a "snaky walk, torso wriggle, stealthy eyes, frozen smile, flat, condescending voice, [and] queenly gestures"—in all, "a triumph of nostalgic vulgarity". West won a lawsuit in 1966 against a Los Angeles performer for infringement of the name "Diamond Lil".
