= 1932 in fine arts of the Soviet Union =

The year 1932 was marked by many events that left an imprint on the history of Soviet and Russian Fine Arts.

== Events ==
- April 23 — The Central committee of the Communist party of USSR adopted a resolution "On the Restructuring of Literary and Artistic Organizations", which provided for the dissolution of the existing literature and art groups and the formation of unified creative unions.
- June 25 — The Moscow Union of Soviet Artists was founded. The Board included Sergei Gerasimov, Alexander Deyneka, Konstantin Yuon, David Shterenberg, Pavel Kuznetsov, and other important Soviet artists.
- August 2 — The Leningrad Union of Soviet Artists was founded. The first Chairman of the Board to be elected was artist Kuzma Petrov-Vodkin.
- Alexander Samokhvalov created his famous painting "Girl in a T-shirt." In 1937 on the International Art Exhibition in Paris, the painting was awarded a gold medal.

== Births ==
- April 28 — Igor Suvorov (Russian: Суворов Игорь Владимирович), Russian Soviet painter.
- May 14 — Yuri Khukhrov (Russian: Хухров Юрий Дмитриевич), Russian Soviet painter (died 2003).
- August 23 — Valentina Monakhova (Russian: Монахова Валентина Васильевна), Russian Soviet painter, graphic artist, and art teacher.

== See also ==
- List of Russian artists
- List of painters of Leningrad Union of Artists
- Saint Petersburg Union of Artists
- Russian culture
- 1932 in the Soviet Union

== Sources ==
- Художники РСФСР за 15 лет. Каталог юбилейной выставки живописи, графики, скульптуры. Л., ГРМ, 1932.
- Выставка ленинградских художников. «Красная газета» (вечерний выпуск), Ленинград, 1932, № 108, С. 3.
- Artists of Peoples of the USSR. Biobibliography Dictionary. Vol. 1. Moscow, Iskusstvo, 1970.
- Artists of Peoples of the USSR. Biobibliography Dictionary. Vol. 2. Moscow, Iskusstvo, 1972.
- Directory of Members of Union of Artists of USSR. Volume 1,2. Moscow, Soviet Artist Edition, 1979.
- Directory of Members of the Leningrad branch of the Union of Artists of Russian Federation. Leningrad, Khudozhnik RSFSR, 1980.
- Artists of Peoples of the USSR. Biobibliography Dictionary. Vol. 4 Book 1. Moscow, Iskusstvo, 1983.
- Directory of Members of the Leningrad branch of the Union of Artists of Russian Federation. - Leningrad: Khudozhnik RSFSR, 1987.
- Персональные и групповые выставки советских художников. 1917-1947 гг. М., Советский художник, 1989.
- Artists of peoples of the USSR. Biobibliography Dictionary. Vol. 4 Book 2. - Saint Petersburg: Academic project humanitarian agency, 1995.
- Link of Times: 1932 - 1997. Artists - Members of Saint Petersburg Union of Artists of Russia. Exhibition catalogue. - Saint Petersburg: Manezh Central Exhibition Hall, 1997.
- Matthew C. Bown. Dictionary of 20th Century Russian and Soviet Painters 1900-1980s. - London: Izomar, 1998.
- Vern G. Swanson. Soviet Impressionism. - Woodbridge, England: Antique Collectors' Club, 2001.
- Sergei V. Ivanov. Unknown Socialist Realism. The Leningrad School. - Saint-Petersburg: NP-Print Edition, 2007. - ISBN 5901724216, ISBN 9785901724217.
- Anniversary Directory graduates of Saint Petersburg State Academic Institute of Painting, Sculpture, and Architecture named after Ilya Repin, Russian Academy of Arts. 1915 - 2005. - Saint Petersburg: Pervotsvet Publishing House, 2007.
