= List of Soviet films of 1932 =

A list of films produced in the Soviet Union in 1932 (see 1932 in film).

== 1932 ==
Title	Russian title	Director	Cast	Genre	Notes
1932
Counterplan	Встречный	Sergei Yutkevich, Fridrikh Ermler	Vladimir Gardin	Drama	
Horizon	Горизонт	Lev Kuleshov	Nikolai Batalov	Drama	
The House of the Dead	Мёртвый дом	Vasili Fyodorov	Nikolay Khmelyov	Drama	
Ivan	Иван	Aleksandr Dovzhenko	Petro Masokha, Stepan Shagaida	Drama	
The Return of Nathan Becker	Возвращение Нейтана Беккера	Boris Shpis, Rashel Milman	Solomon Mikhoels	Drama	
A Simple Case	Простой случай	Vsevolod Pudovkin, Mikhail Doller	Aleksandr Baturin	Drama	
¡Que viva México!	Да здравствует Мексика!	Sergei Eisenstein	Félix Balderas, Sara García, Martín Hernández	Drama	

== See also ==
- 1932 in the Soviet Union
