= The Lumber Champ =

- Pooch sees the girl coonhound for the sixth time
- Directed by: Walter Lantz
- Story by: Walter Lantz
- Produced by: Walter Lantz
- Starring: Tex Avery
- Music by: James Dietrich
- Animation by: Manuel Moreno; Lester Kline; Fred Kopietz; Charles Hastings
- Color process: Black and white
- Production company: Walter Lantz Productions
- Distributed by: Universal Pictures
- Release date: March 13, 1933
- Running time: 8:02
- Country: United States
- Language: English

The Lumber Champ is an animated short film distributed by Universal Pictures. It is the eighth of the thirteen Pooch the Pup cartoons.

== Plot ==
Pooch (now having black ears) is a wood cutter who chops trees for the logging business. His boss is a tall husky cracks a whip at slow-moving works. While looking for trees to cut, Pooch spots his girlfriend, a coonhound, painting some pictures of the scenery. Delighted to see her, Pooch greets his sweetheart. They then sing the song "The Cute Little Things You Do" and walk around together. Looking from a distance, the husky sees them and develops an affinity for the female coonhound. The husky snatches her with his whip and shoots Pooch from a cannon in order to get away with the girl. Eventually, the husky attempts to run over the coonhound with a locomotive, but his attempt is foiled when Pooch redirects the railroad tracks. At the film's conclusion, Pooch's girlfriend kisses him.

== Notes ==
- Pooch still looks much like his original design, although his white ears have been replaced by long black ones.
- The animated trees in the cartoon bear some resemblance to Groucho and Harpo of the Marx brothers.
