= Hot and Cold (film) =

1933 film

- Directed by: Walter Lantz
- Music by: James Dietrich
- Animation by: Manuel Moreno; Les Kline; Fred Kopietz; Charles Hastings
- Color process: Black and white
- Production company: Walter Lantz Productions
- Distributed by: Universal Pictures
- Release date: August 14, 1933
- Running time: 6:53
- Country: United States
- Language: English

Hot and Cold is a short animated film by Walter Lantz Productions and is the eleventh of the thirteen Pooch the Pup cartoons.

== Plot ==
Pooch is walking in the Arctic carrying a stick with a sack attached to it. He then comes across his sweetheart, the girl coonhound, who wears a thick fur coat, and is playing fetch with her pet great dane. The great dane, after doing a few catches, accidentally falls into a hole in the ice. The great dane is pulled out of the hole but is trapped in an ice block. Pooch, using a payphone in the vicinity, then calls a king. The king he called lives in a local shack with switches that control the weather. Upon hearing Pooch's request for warm weather, the king turns off the cold wind, and activates the sun. Some of the snow in the area starts to melt as a result, and the great dane is defrosted. A lot of the other animals around seem to enjoy the suddenly warm climate.

Not everybody is pleased with the weather change. A disturbed polar bear, who's not accustomed to warm temperature, enters the king's shack. The polar bear tangles the king in a net, and moves some of the switches, thus replacing the sun with a blizzard. Pooch comes to the scene moments later. Pooch attempts to approach the switches, only to be thrown outside by the polar bear.

The polar bear chases Pooch across the terrain but Pooch receives help as a group of pelicans and sea lions pelt the polar bear with snow balls. Finally, a penguin tosses ice spikes to encase the white bruin.

Following his encounter with the polar bear, Pooch returns to the shack. The king, now unrestrained (possibly by the girl coonhound), restores the sun back to the area as well as including warm wind. As the warmness goes on uninterrupted, the Arctic landscape is changed to a place similar to those in the South Pacific islands.

== Notes ==
- In the preceding cartoon Pin Feathers, Pooch has black and white fur, a design he would wear in his penultimate, and final cartoons. Here he is temporarily reverted to an earlier incarnation.
- Prior to its release, the film had a working title of S.O.S. Icicle, a parody of the 1933 Universal film S.O.S. Iceberg.
- The film uses the song Turn on the Heat which was used previously in the 1929 film Sunny Side Up.
