= She Done Him Right (1933 film) =

- Directed by: Walter Lantz
- Story by: Walter Lantz
- Produced by: Walter Lantz
- Starring: Jeane Cowan; Tex Avery
- Music by: James Dietrich
- Animation by: Manuel Moreno; Lester Kline; Fred Kopietz; George Grandpre; Ernest Smyth
- Color process: Black and white
- Production company: Walter Lantz Productions
- Distributed by: Universal Pictures
- Release date: October 9, 1933
- Running time: 7:57
- Country: United States
- Language: English

She Done Him Right is a 1933 short animated cartoon by Walter Lantz Productions. It is the 13th and final short of the Pooch the Pup series.

== Plot ==
Based on the same plot as the 1933 film She Done Him Wrong, this seven-minute short features the main characters as canines. A popular singer named Poodles is coming to town, and everybody is excited. Pooch too is excited but has romantic feelings for the performer as well. Upon seeing his love interest come by in a stage coach, Pooch, on his bicycle, comes up from behind to greet her.

At the show which is held at a night club, Poodles sings the jazz song "Minnie the Moocher's Wedding Day" (by Harold Arlen and Ted Koehler). Still madly in love with her, Pooch tries to approach the singer even on stage. This continued until he is pulled and kicked out of the club. Minutes later, Poodles' desperate former lover comes by to take her away. The singer refuses to go but the former lover carries her away in the stage coach. Pooch, who is outside, hears her cries for help, and rides to her rescue.

On his bike, Pooch chases the stage coach into a tunnel where a scuffle occurs. When they finally come out, the ex-lover ends up pulling the coach like a horse. Inside the carriage, Pooch is happy to be with his love interest at last. He and Poodles kiss each other.

== Notes ==
- The short is available on The Woody Woodpecker and Friends Classic Cartoon Collection: Volume 2 DVD box set.
- The short is a parody of the film She Done Him Wrong.
