= Pin Feathers =

- Directed by: Walter Lantz
- Story by: Walter Lantz
- Produced by: Walter Lantz
- Starring: Purv Pullen
- Music by: James Dietrich
- Animation by: Manuel Moreno; Lester Kline; Fred Kopietz; Charles Hasting; Ernest Smyth
- Color process: Black and white
- Production company: Walter Lantz Productions
- Distributed by: Universal Pictures
- Release date: July 3, 1933
- Running time: 9 minutes
- Country: United States
- Language: English

Pin Feathers is a 1933 short animated film produced by Walter Lantz Productions and released by Universal Pictures. It is the 10th Pooch the Pup cartoon.

== Overview ==
Pooch's fur is changed from white to almost entirely black. Also his trousers with a single suspender has been replaced with regular trousers and a sweater. His previous incarnation, however, will have one more go in the next cartoon.

== Plot summary ==
Pooch is walking around in the forest. Though he whistles sometimes, he does not have any lines in this film. On his way, he encounters a young featherless bird that is trying to get a worm. The worm suddenly reverses direction and swallows the bird. Pooch, who is sympathetic for the little fowl, extracts the bird from within the worm.

It appears that the young bird is taking lessons from an older bird that is teaching him bird things. The older bird is teaching the young one how to fly by flapping wings. The young bird takes off from a branch, only to drop after only a few seconds. Pooch then helps out by taking feathers from a turkey, and offers them to the young bird. The young bird is able to fly properly as a result.

The older bird then tells the young bird about learning to chirp before directing the student to another teacher. After attending a brief class from the other teacher, the young bird tries to chirp but to no avail. Pooch tries to help with some demonstration but the little fowl still has difficulty. Because of this, Pooch places a whistle in the young bird's esophagus. The little bird can now make some music.

Meanwhile, a wild cat slowly comes to the scene. The wild cat lures the young bird using its tail disguised as a worm. The wild cat captures and runs away with its prey while Franz Liszt's Hungarian Rhapsody No. 2 plays. Pooch, however, sees the deed, and sends other birds to intervene. Despite receiving disruptive acts from the birds, the wild cat is able to enter a caged compound with the young bird. The caged compound turns out to be a pound occupied by stray dogs which attack the wild cat. The little bird manages to escape.

The end scene shows Pooch walking and whistling the tune of Kingdom Coming which is the opening music of some of his cartoons. The young bird joins him but coughs out the whistle Pooch gave. Pooch simply places it back.
