= Pooch the Pup =

1930s cartoon dog

- Pooch the Pup (art by Walter Lantz Studios). This picture is used as the title card in Guild/Firelight reissues.
- First appearance: The Athlete (1932)
- Last appearance: She Done Him Right (1933)
- Created by: Walter Lantz
- Voiced by: Joe Twerp (King Klunk; commentary voice)

In-universe information
- Species: Dog
- Gender: Male

Pooch the Pup is a cartoon animal character, an anthropomorphic dog, appearing in Walter Lantz cartoons during the studio's black-and-white era. The character appeared in 13 shorts made in 1932 and 1933.

== Biography ==
In 1931, Walter Lantz was encountering slight financial troubles. One way to cope with the problems was to conceive a new series featuring a new character, thus leading to the appearance of Pooch the Pup. While Lantz went on to direct the Pooch the Pup shorts, his colleague Bill Nolan would focus on the long-running Oswald the Lucky Rabbit cartoons.

When surprised about something, Pooch would say "Heh!" in a squeaky fashion. When his girlfriend is in trouble, he pounds his chest and makes a Tarzan-esque shout before moving.

Pooch made his debut in The Athlete. Here, he was a white-furred bloodhound with long black ears. In Pin Feathers, he had black fur, making him appear very similar to Oswald, except for his long, hairless tail.

Pooch's last short was in She Done Him Right, a parody of the film called She Done Him Wrong. Following his retirement from the screen, Oswald was seen in two cartoons wearing a jacket similar to Pooch's. It was suggested that the two Oswald shorts were initially designed to feature Pooch.

== Filmography ==
A later version of Pooch the Pup (center) as seen in King Klunk. His girlfriend (right) is identical to Oswald's from 1933 with the only differences being the garments.

- The Athlete (August 29, 1932)
- The Butcher Boy (September 26, 1932)
- The Crowd Snores (October 24, 1932)
- The Under Dog (November 7, 1932)
- Cats and Dogs (December 5, 1932)
- Merry Dog (January 2, 1933)
- The Terrible Troubadour (January 30, 1933)
- The Lumber Champ (March 13, 1933)
- Nature's Workshop (June 5, 1933)
- Pin Feathers (July 3, 1933)
- Hot and Cold (August 14, 1933)
- King Klunk (September 4, 1933)
- She Done Him Right (October 9, 1933)

Note: One source listed S.O.S. Icicle (May 8, 1933) as a separate cartoon, while another claimed it was a working title for Hot & Cold.

== See also ==
- Walter Lantz Productions
- List of Walter Lantz cartoon characters
