= The Athlete (1932 film) =

1932 film

- Directed by: Walter Lantz; William Nolan
- Music by: James Dietrich
- Animation by: Manuel Moreno; Lester Kline; George Cannata; Bill Weber; Tex Avery
- Color process: Black and white
- Production company: Walter Lantz Productions
- Distributed by: Universal Pictures
- Release date: August 29, 1932
- Running time: 7:52
- Country: United States
- Language: English

The Athlete is a 1932 short animated film by Walter Lantz Productions and distributed by Universal Pictures. The film is the first of a film series featuring Pooch the Pup, the first star character created by Walter Lantz.

== Plot ==
Pooch is a participant in a number of track and field events. Throughout these, a cameraman is following Pooch around, filming him.

His first event is a sprinting competition involving hurdles. Pooch reaches the finish line but fails to come across as the tape slings him back to the starting line. The signal man restarts the race, which is a simple dash this time, and Pooch again reaches the finish line but again gets slung back by the tape. His second flight also causes him to push back the other runners.

The second event involves long jumps. A kangaroo begins, and upon landing, a joey jumps from the kangaroo's pouch. The cartoon shows the joey having a pouch upon landing, from which Pooch springs and lands over a line marked "finish line". The cameraman is waiting and Pooch poses for the camera.

Next, Pooch enters the pole vault event. Pooch gets stuck on a nail attached to the bar. Beside him is a pair of underwear, from which the cameraman emerges to film Pooch. After failing to go over the bar twice, an official lowers it but Pooch still fails a third attempt. The official lowers the bar again, nearly to the ground. Pooch finally makes it over but goes too far and lands on a tree, knocking a bird's nest and its contents down. When he falls to the ground, the nest lands on his head save for one egg; the cameraman hatches from it to film him.

The fourth event is the hammer throw, depicted as a claw hammer attached to a rope. After the first competitor fails, Pooch takes over, but instead of the hammer being thrown, it throws him. Pooch lands in a trash bin ten miles away. The cameraman emerges from the fire hydrant next to him. Pooch rides a taxi to return to the competition.

The final event is a diving competition. The initial competitor is bounced from the plank, and Pooch takes their place, but is bounced to the highest diving board. The cameraman approaches him from behind and begins to film. Pooch throws him over the tower before attempting to dive off, smacking his face on the board as he does. The cameraman films alongside Pooch as he dives. The target is a bathtub, and someone inside it picks it up and carries it off when they see Pooch headed toward them. An official uses their hat as a tube that sends Pooch back to the high diving platform, but it rolls itself up and Pooch falls back down. Everyone below moves away. Pooch plummets into the ground, creating a deep hole as a result. A Chinese man from the hole picks Pooch up and places him back on the surface, lecturing him before reentering the hole.

Pooch is surrounded by the audience at the end of the competition. The cameraman comes to film him, and he poses as he did after the long jump. An official presents him first booby prize, which Pooch opens to find a tureen. A cameraman is inside the tureen, and pops out to take a still photo with too much powder loaded into the flash. It kills everyone but Pooch. He looks up to see everyone with halos and angel wings, floating towards the sky.

== Production ==
Animation and dialogue were credited to Walter Lantz and William Nolan, with the pair as co-directors. Tex Avery worked as an animator on the project, specifically credited with the starting pistol scene. Animation was also credited to George Cannata, Lester Kline, Manuel Moreno, and Bill Weber, with James Dietrich composing the music.

The film's story satirized the 1932 Summer Olympics.

== Release ==
The Athlete was released on August 29, 1932. It was also included in rentals alongside the films Evergreen and Born for Glory in 1936.

== Sources ==
- "16mm Sound-on-Film Motion Pictures". Films Incorporated Catalogue. New York. 1936 – via Internet Archive.
- Adamson, Joe (1990). Bugs Bunny: Fifty Years and One Grey Hare. New York: Henry Holt and Company. ISBN 0-8050-1190-0. LCCN 90-4074. OCLC 24817595 – via Internet Archive.
- Fitzgerald, Michael G. (1977). Universal Pictures: A Panoramic History in Words, Pictures, and Filmographies. New Rochelle: Arlington House Publishers. ISBN 0-87000-366-6. LCCN 76-451777. OCLC 2493610 – via Internet Archive.
- Lenburg, Jeff (2009). The Encyclopedia of Cartoons (3rd ed.). New York: Facts on File. ISBN 978-0-8160-6599-8. LCCN 2007025676. OCLC 145396632 – via Internet Archive.
- Lenburg, Jeff (1993). The Great Cartoon Directors. New York: Da Capo Press. ISBN 9780306805219. OCLC 1035310767 – via Internet Archive.
- McCall, Douglas L. (1998). Film Cartoons: A Guide to 20th Century American Animated Features and Shorts. Jefferson, North Carolina: McFarland & Company. ISBN 0-7864-2450-8. LCCN 98-26404. OCLC 921143357 – via Internet Archive.
- Webb, Graham (2000). The Animated Film Encyclopedia: A Complete Guide to American Shorts, Features, and Sequences, 1900-1979. Jefferson, North Carolina: McFarland & Company. ISBN 0-7864-0728-X. OCLC 44554330 – via Internet Archive.
