= Diamond Lil (play) =

Play by Mae West

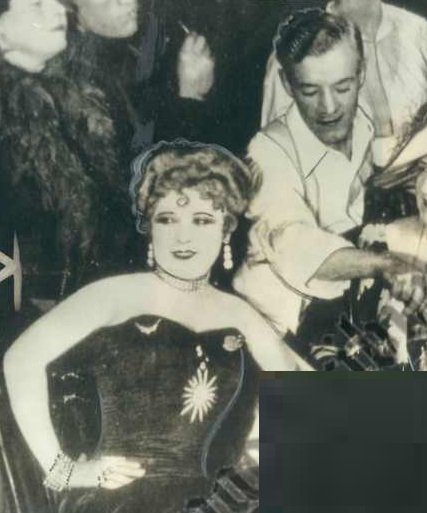
Mae West and her husband Frank Wallace in Diamond Lil in 1929

Diamond Lil is a 1928 play by American actress and playwright Mae West. Prior to Diamond Lil, she had written a number of plays that were closed down due to either poor ticket sales or censorship issues with the establishments of the time, despite the fact that many high-ranking officials attended these plays. Diamond Lil, about a racy woman in the 1890s, was her first major Broadway success, and was the basis for her character Lady Lou in her 1933 film She Done Him Wrong.

Both West and the play were the final performers at the Nixon Theater in Pittsburgh, Pennsylvania before the theater was closed for a skyscraper development on April 29, 1950.

== See also ==
- Diamond Tooth Lil
