= The Crowd Snores =

1932 film

- Directed by: Walter Lantz
- Music by: James Dietrich
- Animation by: Manuel Moreno; Lester Kline; George Cannata; Bill Weber
- Color process: Black and white
- Production company: Walter Lantz Productions
- Distributed by: Universal Pictures
- Release date: October 24, 1932
- Running time: 7:12
- Language: English

The Crowd Snores is a short animated film produced by Walter Lantz Productions. It is the third film to feature Pooch the Pup. The film is also a parody of the Warner Bros. feature film The Crowd Roars.

== Plot ==
Pooch is a race car driver competing in an auto racing event. Although his vehicle breaks down while the other drivers set off, Pooch is able to do some repairs on time and move.

In the race, Pooch catches up as he elevates his car over every vehicle in his path. A bubble gum trick applied by a bystander does only little to slow him down. When another driver punches him, Pooch goes into a fistfight until that driver falls off the edge of a mountainside road.

Halfway in the race, Pooch stops at a refueling station. Little does he know that the fuel provided at the station is very low grade. Pooch's car starts to act bizarrely a little but still manages to carry on in the event.

Back into the race, another driver loses two rear tires. Pooch, coming from behind, shows the gesture of a gentleman as he stops by and helps that driver run again. That other driver exhibits ingratitude by just leaving and blowing smoke at Pooch. As they continue running, the other driver scatters nails which destroy all of Pooch's tires. Pooch then resorts to using rats as replacements for his tires. The rats make good carriers until his vehicle gets knocked off the track after colliding a tree. After going airborne, Pooch's car lands on a cow which carries him back into the race. Despite the other driver's clever wheel tactics, Pooch's cow-carried car reaches the finish line and wins.
