= Cats and Dogs (1932 film) =

1932 film

- Directed by: Walter Lantz
- Story by: Walter Lantz
- Produced by: Walter Lantz
- Starring: Tex Avery
- Music by: James Dietrich
- Animation by: Manuel Moreno; Lester Kline; George Cannata; Bill Weber
- Color process: Black and white
- Production company: Walter Lantz Productions
- Distributed by: Universal Pictures
- Release date: December 5, 1932
- Running time: 7:06
- Country: United States
- Language: English

Cats and Dogs is a 1932 short animated film and the fifth Pooch the Pup cartoon.

== Plot ==
Pooch is a football player who leads the Hot Dogs, an all-dog team. They take on the Wild Cats, a team which is composed entirely of cats.

Just before the start of the game, Pooch is spending time with his girlfriend, Poodles Hound (now wearing a beret with a cottonball of top) as she sits in the stands. A Wild Cats player comes by, pushes Pooch aside, and tries to impress Poodles with his large chest. Pooch tries to answer back by placing an overinflated football in his shirt, but the cat pops the ball with a pin. Despite Pooch's failed stunt, Poodles still has affection for him. She even kisses Pooch and encourages him to perform well.

The game begins and Pooch is first to take the ball. After some exchanges, the Hot Dogs score a touchdown, thanks to a stretchy dachshund player. As the game resumes, more trades with the ball ensue until this time the feline team scores a touchdown, thus evening the score.

When the match still goes on, only a minute left remains. Pooch's teammates, however, morph into a steamroller which flattens most of the feline team. The flatten players are carried away on stretchers. Although one of the cats, who has the ball, gets close to the feline team's touchdown area, that player is stopped on time by the morphed dogs. Pooch manages to take the ball and ends the game in his favor with a field goal.

Following the win, Pooch and Poodles spend the rest of the day romancing, with the sky behind them fading from day to night as they sit and snuggle.
