= The Under Dog (film) =

1932 film

- Directed by: Walter Lantz
- Music by: James Dietrich
- Animation by: Manuel Moreno; Lester Kline; George Cannata; Bill Weber
- Color process: Black and white
- Production company: Walter Lantz Productions
- Distributed by: Universal Pictures
- Release date: November 7, 1932
- Running time: 7:56
- Country: United States
- Language: English

The Under Dog is a 1932 short animated film produced by Walter Lantz Productions and distributed by Universal Pictures. It is the fourth film featuring Pooch the Pup.

== Plot ==
Pooch (now wearing shoes and a hat) is a penniless vagabond wandering the countryside, and carrying a bindle. On his way, he comes across his sweetheart the girl coonhound (now having lighter fur) who is milking a cow. After they greet each other, Pooch sings the song A Great Big Bunch of You. Moments later, an old dog, who is the girl coonhound's employer, shows up and is not happy to see him. The old dog hurls Pooch past the fences bordering the farmlands where he lands next to a sign saying "No tramps allowed".

Still wanting to fit in, Pooch reenters the farmlands and comes to an outdoor dining table where a pack of farmers are eating. Pooch asks for some food but the farmers refuse to offer a piece. One of those who are dining is the old dog who shoos him away.

While standing around back outside the fences, Pooch spots an anthropomorphic tornado coming. Pooch returns to the farmlands to warn everybody about the approaching storm. The farmers flee in various directions. Pooch, the girl coonhound, and the old dog take shelter in a shed which is a storage for explosives. The tornado knows about this before picking up and setting the shed ablaze. Pooch helps the girl coonhound and the old dog leave the small house first. As Pooch stays in the shed for a few more moments, he picks up a windmill's turbine which he uses as a propeller to redirect the shed to the tornado. He then notices the farmers showing up to rescue him as they hold a life net. With this, Pooch finally jumps to his safety. The tornado tries to avoid the shed but to no avail. When the shed, at last, detonates, the tornado is completely neutralized.

Back on the ground, the old dog is impressed with the heroic act of Pooch whom he now welcomes to the society. Pooch then continues to spend time with the girl coonhound. Pooch and the girl coonhound get themselves a house, a picket fence, and a stroller full of puppies looking identical to the boy beagle from the Oswald cartoons.

== Song ==
Featured in the film is the song A Great Big Bunch of You which is composed by Harry Warren and Mort Dixon. The song was popularized by artists such as Al Bowlly, Eddie Lane, Cliff Edwards, Syd Lipton, Joe Moss, Harriot Lee, Jack Hylton, Carroll Gibbons, and the String of Pearls. It is also featured in a Merrie Melodies short which shares the song's title, A Great Big Bunch of You.
