= She Done Him Wrong =

1933 American crime/comedy film by Lowell Sherman

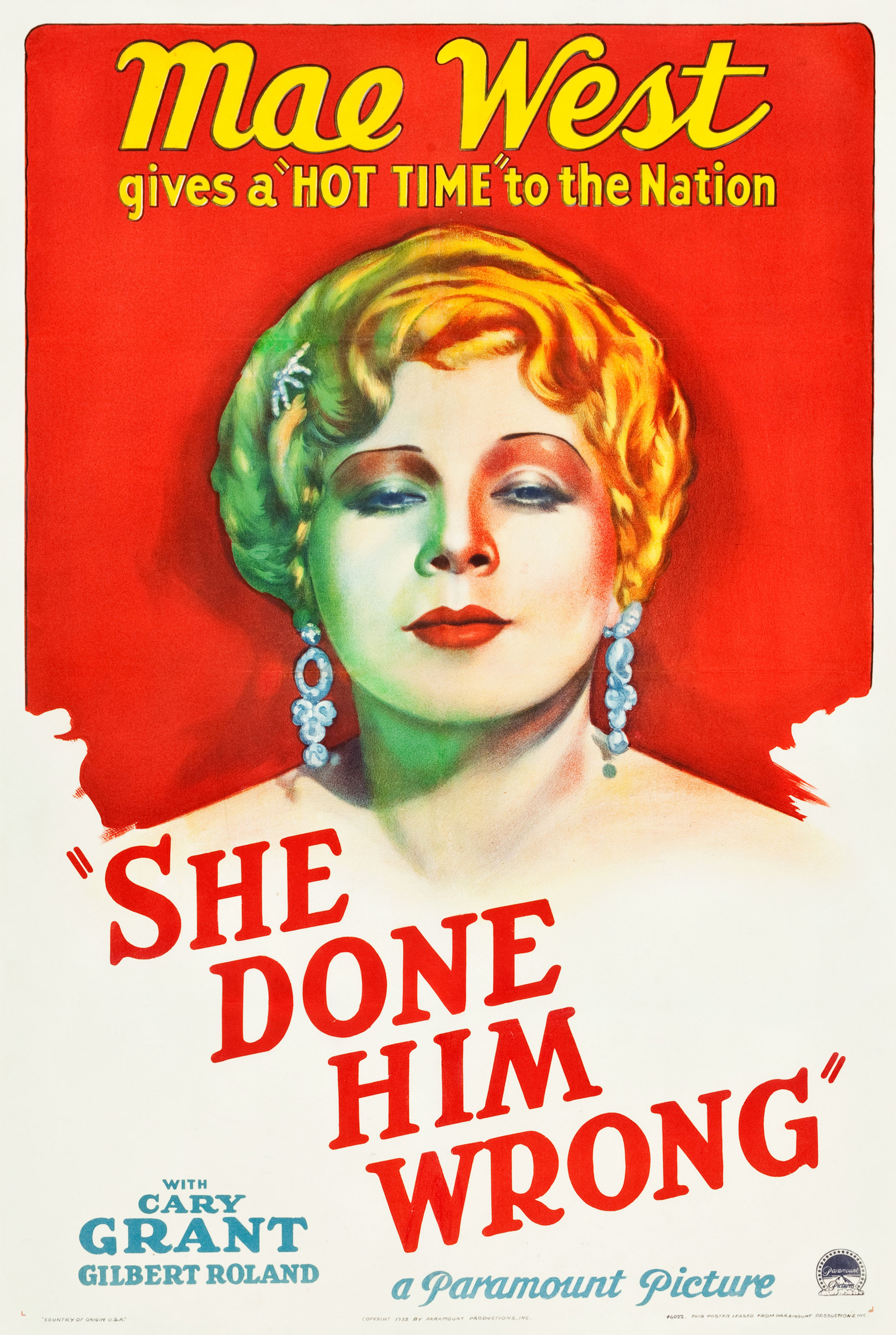
- Theatrical release poster
- Directed by: Lowell Sherman
- Screenplay by: Harvey F. Thew; John Bright
- Based on: Diamond Lil; 1928 play by Mae West
- Produced by: William LeBaron
- Starring: Mae West; Cary Grant; Gilbert Roland
- Cinematography: Charles Lang
- Edited by: Alexander Hall
- Music by: John Leipold (uncredited)
- Production company: Paramount Pictures
- Distributed by: Paramount Pictures
- Release date: January 27, 1933
- Running time: 66 minutes
- Country: United States
- Language: English
- Budget: $200,000
- Box office: $2.2 million

She Done Him Wrong is a 1933 pre-Code American crime/comedy film starring Mae West and Cary Grant, directed by Lowell Sherman. The plot includes melodramatic and musical elements, with a supporting cast featuring Owen Moore, Gilbert Roland, Noah Beery Sr., Rochelle Hudson, and Louise Beavers. The film was adapted from the successful 1928 Broadway play Diamond Lil by Mae West. The film is famous for West's many double entendres and quips, including her best-known "Why don't you come up sometime and see me?". She Done Him Wrong was a box-office success and the film was nominated for the Academy Award for Best Picture.

In 1996, She Done Him Wrong was selected for preservation in the United States National Film Registry by the Library of Congress as being "culturally, historically, or aesthetically significant".

== Plot ==
The story is set in New York City in the 1890s. A bawdy singer, Lady Lou, works in the Bowery barroom saloon of her boss and benefactor, Gus Jordan, who has given her many diamonds. But Lou is a lady with more men friends than anyone might imagine.

What she does not know is that Gus traffics in prostitution and runs a counterfeiting ring to help finance her expensive diamonds. He also sends young women to San Francisco to be pickpockets. Gus works with two other crooked entertainer-assistants, Russian Rita and Rita's lover, the suave Sergei Stanieff. One of Gus's rivals and former "friend" of Lou's, named Dan Flynn, spends most of the movie dropping hints to Lou that Gus is up to no good, promising to look after her once Gus is in jail. Lou leads him on, hinting at times that she will return to him, but eventually he loses patience and implies he'll see her jailed if she doesn't submit to him.

A city mission is located next door to the bar. Its young director, Captain Cummings, is in reality an undercover federal agent working to infiltrate and expose the illegal activities in the bar. Gus suspects nothing; he worries only that Cummings will reform his bar and scare away his customers.

Lou's former boyfriend, Chick Clark, is a vicious criminal who was convicted of robbery and sent to prison for trying to steal diamonds for her. In his absence, she becomes attracted to the handsome young psalm-singing reformer.

Warned that Chick thinks she's betrayed him, she goes to the prison to try to reassure him. All the inmates greet her warmly and familiarly as she walks down the cellblock. Chick becomes angry and threatens to kill her if she double-crosses or two-times him before he gets out. She lies and claims she has been true to him. Gus gives counterfeit money to Rita and Sergei to spend. Chick escapes from jail, and police search for him in the bar. He comes into Lou's room and starts to strangle her, breaking off only because he still loves her and cannot harm her. Lou calms him down by promising that she will go with him when she finishes her next number.

After Sergei gives Lou a diamond pin belonging to Rita, Rita starts a fight with Lou, who accidentally stabs her to death. Lou calmly combs the dead woman's long hair to hide the fact Rita is dead while the police search the room for Chick Clark. She has her bodyguard Spider, who "would do anything for you, Lou" dispose of Rita's body. She then tells Spider to bring Chick, who's hiding in an alley, back to her room upstairs. Then, while she sings "Frankie and Johnny", she silently signals to Dan Flynn that he should go to her room to wait for her, even though she knows Chick is in there with a gun. Chick shoots Dan dead and the gunfire draws a police raid. Cummings shows his badge and reveals himself as "The Hawk", a well-known Federal agent, as he arrests Gus and Sergei. Chick, still lurking in Lou's room, is about to kill Lou for double-crossing him, when Cummings also apprehends him.

Cummings then takes Lou away in an open horse-drawn carriage instead of the paddywagon into which all the other criminals have been loaded. He tells her she doesn't belong in jail and removes all her other rings and slips a diamond engagement ring onto her left ring finger.

== Cast ==
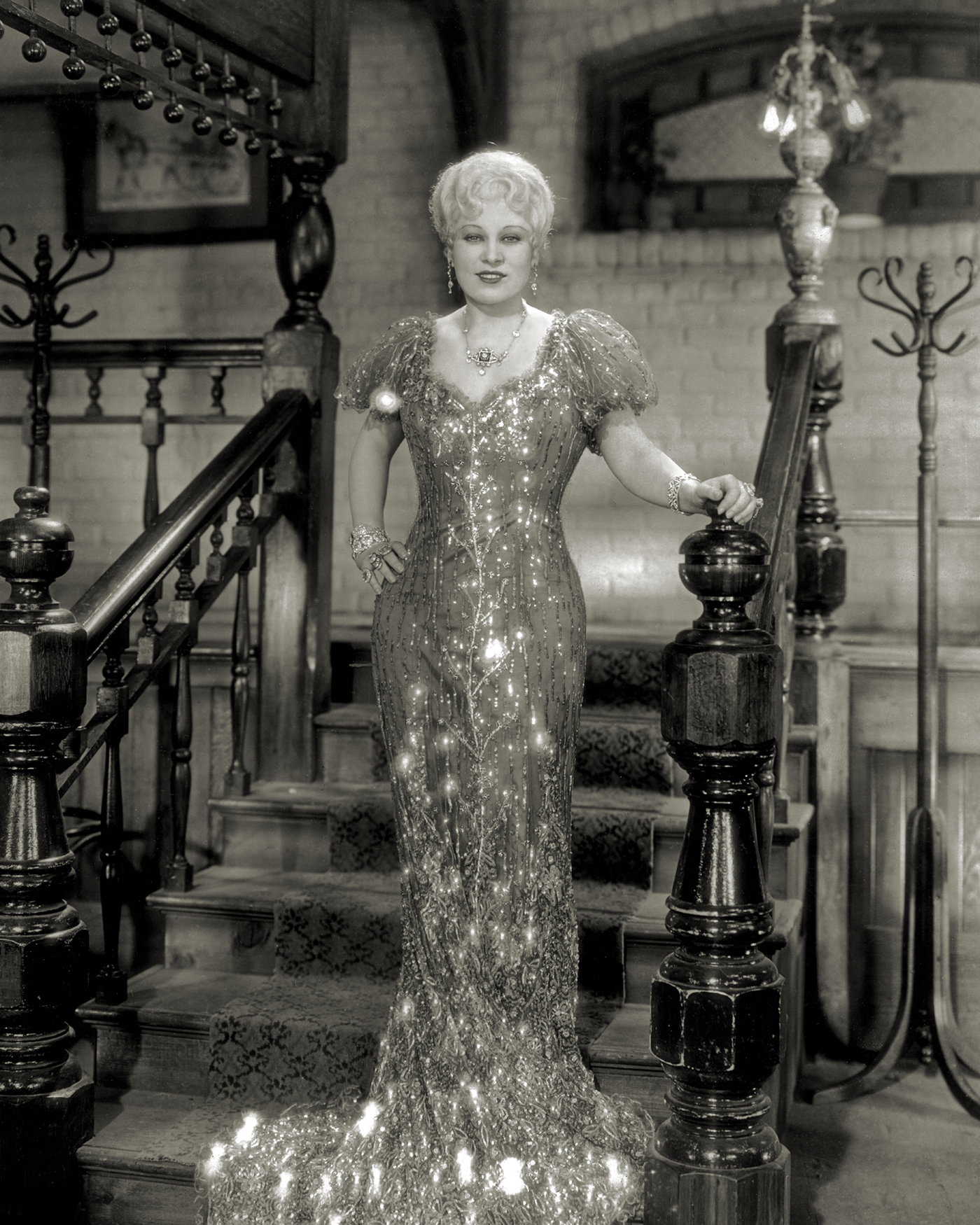
Mae West in the film

- Mae West as Lady Lou
- Cary Grant as Capt. Cummings
- Owen Moore as Chick Clark
- Gilbert Roland as Sergei Stanieff
- Noah Beery Sr. as Gus Jordan
- David Landau as Dan Flynn
- Rafaela Ottiano as Russian Rita
- Dewey Robinson as Spider Kane
- Rochelle Hudson as Sally
- Tammany Young as Chuck Connors
- Fuzzy Knight as Ragtime Kelly
- Grace La Rue as Frances Kelly
- Robert Homans as Doheney
- Louise Beavers as Pearl (Lou's maid)

== Production ==
The film was directed by Lowell Sherman and produced by William LeBaron. The script was adapted by Harvey F. Thew and John Bright. Original music was composed by Ralph Rainger, John Leipold and Stephan Pasternacki. Charles Lang was responsible for the cinematography, and the costumes were designed by Edith Head.

Blonde Venus (with Marlene Dietrich) and Madame Butterfly (with Sylvia Sidney), both predate She Done Him Wrong but West always claimed to have discovered Grant for her film, claiming that until then Grant had only made "some tests with starlets".

The Hays Code declared the play Diamond Lil banned from the screen and repeatedly demanded changes to remove associations with or elements from the play, including suggested titles with the word "diamond". The adaption was finally allowed under the condition that the play not be referred to in publicity or advertising. Joseph Breen, who oversaw the more effectual enforcement of the Code beginning in 1934, blocked She Done Him Wrong from being rereleased in 1935 and again in 1949.

Rafaela Ottiano, who portrayed Russian Rita in the Broadway version, was cast on West's recommendation in the same role, which led to work with West throughout her career.

Louise Beavers was the only African-American actress to be brought onto the film by West personally. She wanted a black woman to appear with her. When she did stage and screen work, West made it a point to act with black American actors and actresses, helping to break racial discrimination in entertainment. West's stage shows resulted in her arrest for saucy material and her having black actors on stage was extremely controversial. With this film, she and her Paramount bosses called the shots: Black stars appeared in a few of her films after this one.

== Reception ==
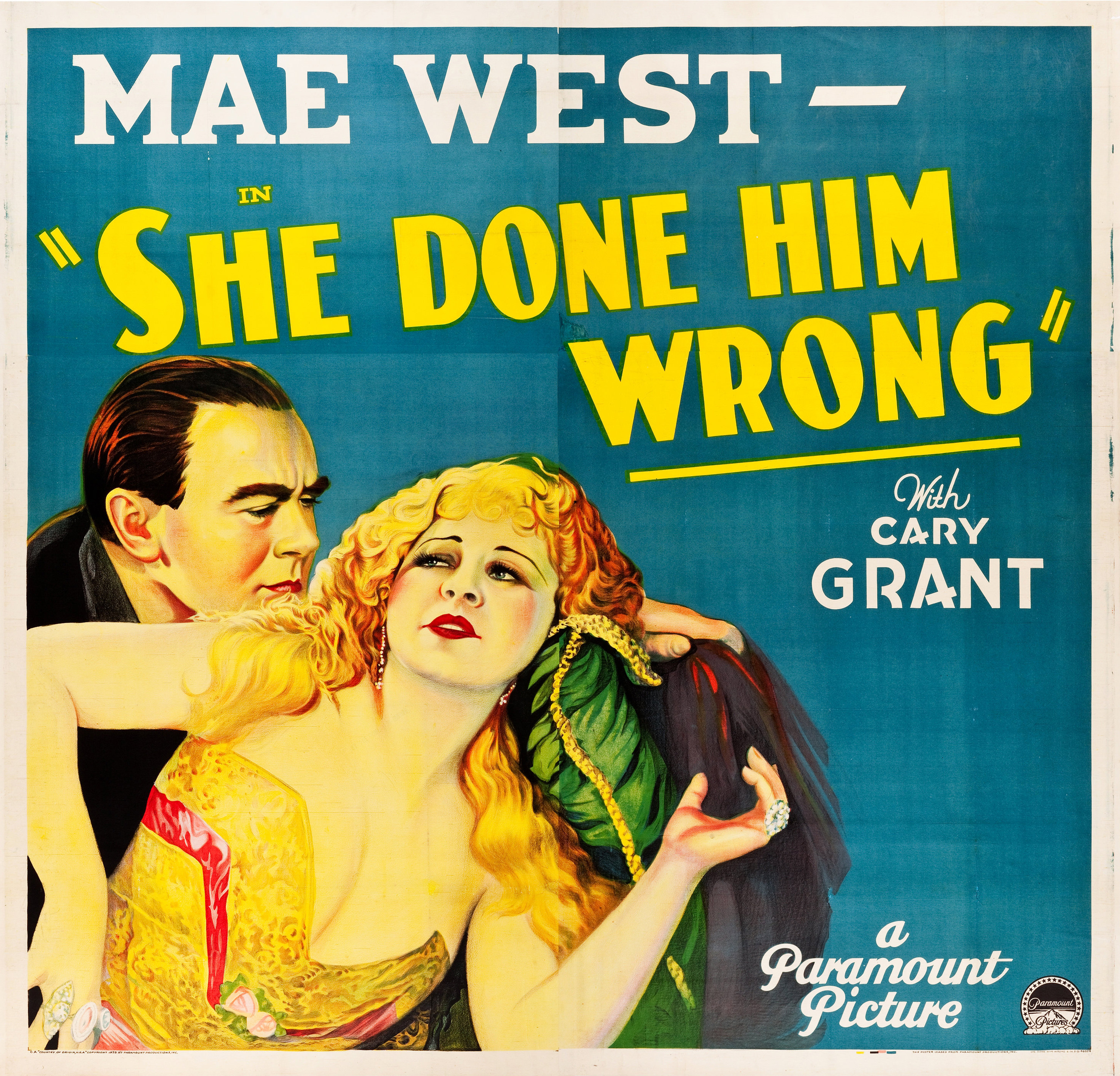
Alternate theatrical release poster with Owen Moore pictured

The film was a box-office success, grossing $2,000,000 domestically with a budget of $200,000. Variety's "Bige" gave She Done Him Wrong a negative review, stating that Paramount was attempting to rush Mae West to stardom by giving her her own film and top billing, and that the film was not very good without known actors and an entertaining story, despite the presence of extremely well-known actors Noah Beery Sr. and Owen Moore, not to mention up-and-comer Cary Grant.

Pauline Kael wrote: "Mae West, the great shady lady of the screen, wiggles and sings "Easy Rider" and seduces virtuous young Cary Grant. A classic comedy and a classic seduction." Film critic Leonard Maltin in his Movie Guide gave it four of four stars: "West repeats her stage role of Diamond Lil ... in her best film." Leslie Halliwell gave it three of four stars: "As near undiluted Mae West as Hollywood ever came: fast, funny, melodramatic and pretty sexy; also a very atmospheric and well-made movie."

She Done Him Wrong was nominated for the Academy Award for Outstanding Production, now known as Best Picture. At 66 minutes, it is the shortest film to be so honored.

The film is recognized by American Film Institute in these lists:

- 1998: AFI's 100 Years...100 Movies – Nominated
- 2000: AFI's 100 Years...100 Laughs – #75
- 2004: AFI's 100 Years...100 Songs:
  - "Frankie and Johnny" – Nominated
- 2005: AFI's 100 Years...100 Movie Quotes:
  - Lady Lou: "Why don't you come up sometime and see me?" – #26
- 2007: AFI's 100 Years...100 Movies (10th Anniversary Edition) – Nominated

== Note ==
West's famous line to Cary Grant is "Why don't you come up some time and see me?" in She Done Him Wrong. She changed it to "Come up and see me sometime" in her next movie I'm No Angel, released the same year and co-starring Grant.

She Done Him Wrong bears some resemblances to The Bowery, a film released later the same year by United Artists starring Noah Beery's brother Wallace. The two films each include a saloon owner named Chuck Conners as a main character (played by Wallace Beery) in The Bowery and a smaller role (played by Tammany Young) in She Done Him Wrong.

The animated cartoon short She Done Him Right followed in 1933 as a parody spinoff of She Done Him Wrong.

Universal Pictures, through its EMKA division, currently handles distribution of the film.
