= The Butcher Boy (1932 film) =

1932 film

- Pooch reaches his sweetheart's house
- Directed by: Walter Lantz
- Story by: Walter Lantz
- Produced by: Walter Lantz
- Music by: James Dietrich
- Animation by: Manuel Moreno; Lester Kline; George Cannata; Bill Weber
- Color process: Black and white
- Distributed by: Universal Pictures
- Release date: September 26, 1932
- Running time: 7:05
- Country: United States
- Language: English

The Butcher Boy is an animated cartoon by Walter Lantz Productions and is the second of the thirteen Pooch the Pup cartoons.

== Plot ==
Pooch operates a meat store in the city. One day, he receives an order by phone from his sweetheart, the girl coonhound, who calls for a stout chicken. Pooch then selects the right meat for the order and sets off in his horse-drawn carriage.

Pooch arrives at the house of his recipient. As he comes to the door carrying a basket with the order, a mischievous pet Burmese cat takes a peek. The cat, for some reason, takes the chicken from the container and runs off, prompting Pooch and the girl coonhound to go after.

At the front yard of the house, Pooch grabs hold of the chicken but the cat refuses to let go. To help her boyfriend, the girl coonhound also pulls from behind. This tug-of-war lead to the dogs taking the skeleton, and the cat taking the skin, therefore ruining the order. It also results in Pooch trampling on the girl coonhound, knocking her unconscious. Trying to revive her, the worried Pooch pours two buckets of water on his sweetheart but to no avail. Meanwhile, the cat plans to create more mischief by attaching one end of a long rope to an automatic wringer and goes inside the house carrying the other end.

Pooch is still in the front yard, not knowing what to do as the girl coonhound is still in coma. Just then, the cat comes to them, pretending to regret what happened as well as encouraging Pooch to kick it in the rear. Obliged, Pooch delivers a kick, but the sneaky feline quickly puts the other end of the rope around his leg. The cat then activates the automatic wringer, and Pooch is pulled away.

As he is dragged by the long string, the helpless Pooch goes around beds, stair handrails, and rooftops. While he is able to remove the rope from his leg at some point, it comes back somehow. Along the way, he catches a hefty chicken.

When Pooch is getting closer to the wringer, the cat, standing next to the machine, begins celebrating. This enjoyment is soon cut short as the feline is nabbed by Pooch's new chicken, resulting all three of them to be wrung.

The girl coonhound, who already regained consciousness, comes by and notices the wringer being turned on. Exiting the machine first is the cat which walks away in a flat dimension. Finally, a daze Pooch pops his head out. He also shows the chicken he caught which is now featherless. Amazed by the sight, the girl coonhound embraces and kisses him.

== Availability ==
The cartoon is available in a Guild/Firelight reissue.
