= The Shipwreck =

1931 film

Shipwreck
- Directed by: Walter Lantz; Bill Nolan
- Starring: Fred Avery
- Music by: James Dietrich
- Animation by: Clyde Geronimi; Manuel Moreno; Ray Abrams; Fred Avery; Lester Kline; Pinto Colvig
- Color process: Black and white
- Production company: Walter Lantz Productions
- Distributed by: Universal Pictures
- Release date: February 9, 1931
- Running time: 6:09
- Language: English

Shipwreck, also known by its reissue title of The Shipwreck, is a 1931 short animated film starring Oswald the Lucky Rabbit. The film is the 37th Oswald cartoon by Walter Lantz Productions and the 89th overall.

== Plot ==
Oswald (wearing gloves for the first time), and a parrot are on a log boat, riding on a rough sea. The sea becomes calm moments later. They then notice they are hungry and decided to fish. Oswald casts a line and the parrot goes down with the hook to find a suitable fish. The parrot places the line on a fish and signals Oswald to reel in, but the fish the parrot selected is too big and therefore drags Oswald below the sea.

The fish has Oswald in his grasp before putting the rabbit in his mouth. The fish, however, finds out he isn't hungry and that he removes Oswald. He tells he'll be hungry again and will look for them after an hour. Oswald and the parrot figure they need to get away far and quickly as possible.

Oswald and the parrot go on to wonder the floor of the sea, but instead of continuing, they come across an old organ which catches their curiosity (and also distracts them from their getaway). As Oswald plays the organ, he and the parrot sing the song It Ain't Gonna Rain No Mo'. Other sea creatures join their singing.

The hour has passed, and the fish comes for the two friends. Oswald and the parrot, who are still at the organ, frantically make their move upon seeing their pursuer. While they try to keep distance, the fish manages to get his teeth on the parrot's tail. Oswald refuses to let go of the bird. A tug-of-war ensues until the fish ends up having his skeleton extracted. Oswald and the parrot are relieved of their worries, knowing the now boneless fish can longer go after them.
