= Not So Quiet =

1930 film

- Full short
- Directed by: Walter Lantz
- Story by: Walter Lantz; Bill Nolan
- Produced by: Walter Lantz
- Music by: James Dietrich
- Animation by: Ray Abrams; Manuel Moreno; Clyde Geronimi; Pinto Colvig
- Color process: Black and white
- Production company: Walter Lantz Productions
- Distributed by: Universal Pictures
- Release date: June 30, 1930
- Running time: 6:35
- Language: English

Not So Quiet is a 1930 animated short film produced by Walter Lantz and stars Oswald the Lucky Rabbit. The title is a parody of All Quiet on the Western Front, an Academy Award-winning Universal film released in the same year.

== Plot ==
Oswald is a private and is sent into the battlefield. It is dawn and he dozes inside a tent. The general calls out to assemble the privates. Oswald anxiously comes out late, with his pants down and gives salute. (He pulls them back up after leaving the tent). The general then gives the privates an exercise where they line up, carry a gun and march back and forth. In the drill, Oswald keeps toppling on the other privates, much to their annoyance, but all that is because the general carelessly gave him a gun that is too big and cumbersome.

While he is disappointed and wonders what penalty he'll receive, Oswald sees a girl cat singing him a serenade from the other side of a river. Oswald is fascinated and decides to meet her. But before he can cross the river, Oswald is approached by the general who orders him to deliver a note to the enemy general.

The rabbit agrees and goes on to carry the message. Untouchable, Oswald evades every single bullet that comes his way and hides behind things (such as tree stumps) for cover. At last, Oswald reaches the enemy general and hands the message. To his horror, Oswald realizes he was betrayed by his own general when the note tells the enemy leader to shoot him when the sun comes up. Oswald runs for his safety and has to pass through more obstacles. The two battling forces resort to larger ammunition, making escape very difficult.

The two forces finally agree to a cease-fire after several moments. Oswald is relieved of his worries. The girl cat from beyond the river comes to him and gives Oswald a kiss.

== See also ==
- Oswald the Lucky Rabbit filmography
