= Mars (1930 film) =

1930 film

- Title card
- Directed by: Walter Lantz; Bill Nolan
- Produced by: Walter Lantz
- Starring: Pinto Colvig
- Music by: James Dietrich
- Animation by: Clyde Geronimi; Manuel Moreno; Ray Abrams; Fred Avery; Lester Kline; Pinto Colvig
- Color process: Black and white
- Production company: Walter Lantz Productions
- Distributed by: Universal Pictures
- Release date: December 29, 1930
- Running time: 5:50
- Language: English

Mars is a 1930 short animated film in the Oswald the Lucky Rabbit series.

== Plot ==
Full short

Oswald and a big badger are sitting on a bench in a park. Momentarily a pretty female cat walks around and sings the song A Bench in the Park (this song was used earlier in King of Jazz). When she drops a handkerchief, Oswald and the badger rush to pick it up. Upon picking, they pull the handkerchief until it is ripped apart. When the cat passes by again, Oswald snags part of the badger's clothing onto a nail on the bench. The badger rushes again and ends up wearing just his undergarments. Oswald then approaches the cat as the badger runs away in embarrassment. Before he could spend a long time with her, the badger returns in a wine barrel before kicking Oswald in the rear. The kick is so strong that Oswald is sent into space.

Following a long trip after being booted, Oswald finds himself landing on the planet Mars. He encounters a lot of bizarre animals before meeting their king. When the Martian king asks for his identity, Oswald introduces himself by singing his theme song. The king likes his song and so do the bizarre animals. After everybody parties around for several moments, a giant spider-like creature comes to the scene. All the other animals run away, including Oswald. Oswald continues to run until he reaches an edge. Without any other place to go, the rabbit is forced to jump. Oswald falls and finds himself moving in space again. On the way, he finds a meteoroid which he rides on.

Back on Earth, the badger and the cat are recently married as they walk around in their wedding outfits in the park. The cat, however, does not seem to enjoy her newfound relationship. Suddenly, Oswald's meteoroid drops by, striking and knocking the badger unconscious, later knocked Oswald for a second. The cat appears to be overjoyed by the sight as the badger got knocked out, laying down on the sidewalk, and the cat and Oswald walks towards the badger's stomach and gives Oswald a kiss. Later, the cat goes on to date Oswald.
