= Henpecked =

1930 film

- Directed by: Walter Lantz; Bill Nolan
- Story by: Walter Lantz; Bill Nolan
- Produced by: Walter Lantz
- Starring: Pinto Colvig; Walter Lantz
- Music by: James Dietrich
- Animation by: Bill Nolan; Ray Abrams; Manuel Moreno; Clyde Geronimi; Pinto Colvig
- Color process: Black and white
- Production company: Walter Lantz Productions
- Distributed by: Universal Pictures
- Release date: August 11, 1930
- Running time: 6:34
- Language: English

Henpecked is a 1930 animated short produced by Walter Lantz that features Oswald the Lucky Rabbit.

== Plot ==
Full short

Oswald is playing piano in his apartment room, singing a swing song. Peg Leg Pete is annoyed and confronts him. When the bear opens the door, he sternly drags Oswald off the piano, choking him while his fingers are stuck on keys, and tells Oswald to quit playing and ensure silence. Oswald hesitantly agrees to the demands. A moment later, a frog from a glass bowl jumps out and lands on some piano keys before leaping out of the scene. In this, the bear picks up the piano and tosses it out of the window. Before the bruin leaves, he gives Oswald a reminder.

Hours later, Oswald receives a phone call. Speaking to him is a stray kitten who is a friend of his. The kitten is looking to visit Oswald and to bring in a pack of other stray kittens. Oswald rejects the offer because of the deal he made with his grumpy neighbor. Nevertheless, the stray kittens march and jump with joy (with several animation errors) on sidewalks and roads as one of the kittens with Lantz's voice told the other strays to follow him.

To Oswald's dismay, they jump with joy and march inside the apartment and begin rough-housing. They jump on beds shouting "whoopie" (later breaking the bed forcing a huge bed bug evacuation with sped-up gibberish voices), perform acrobatics on chandeliers, catapult Oswald around with a blanket, and even one of the kittens opened Oswald's mouth by using his ears and another one shoves an umbrella inside his mouth, which sends him floating like a balloon in the hallway. The umbrella was later hooked, and drags Oswald down to the ground making the umbrella come out of his mouth. As they are having their wild fun, one of them decides to play a prank on the bear by putting a clothes iron in the latter's trousers. Oswald tries to intervene but to no avail. The bear twitches in pain and frantically runs around before sitting in a bucket filled with water.

Minutes afterward, one of the stray kittens plays a trombone. As the tiny cat performs, the slide of his instrument starts striking the ceiling, and its impact is felt by the bear who is bathing straight upstairs. Eventually, the floor of the bathroom crumbles and collapses. The bruin plummets to the floor below and figures that this is the last straw.

Learning that they are in hot water, Oswald and the stray kittens lock themselves in an apartment room. Immediately, the bear comes up with a successful method of sucking them all under the door using a vacuum cleaner—including a mouse waiter who is holding some food with a cover on a plate, and Oswald (acting like Oswald's tongue goes through his body). The bear removes the vacuum bag and dumps it outside, where somehow it opens automatically. Although they are excluded, the stray kittens have had a good time and Oswald cannot believe it. When the stray cats see Oswald feeling dazed (moving his head all around in a circle), the stray cats sing Oswald's short theme to Oswald.

== Cast ==
- Pinto Colvig as Oswald the Lucky Rabbit / Peg Leg Pete
- Walter Lantz as the stray kittens

== Publicity flaws ==
The second edition of Jeff Lenburg's Encyclopedia of Animated Cartoons mistakenly mentions Hen Fruit as the working title for this short. Hen Fruit is in fact a 1929 Oswald cartoon. As a result, references to Henpecked were removed in the third edition.

== See also ==
- Oswald the Lucky Rabbit filmography
