= The Hunter (1931 film) =

1931 film

- Theatrical poster Note: Despite its illustration, a lion isn't used in the film.
- Directed by: Walter Lantz; Bill Nolan
- Story by: Walter Lantz; Bill Nolan
- Produced by: Walter Lantz
- Starring: Shirley Reed; Pinto Colvig
- Music by: James Dietrich
- Animation by: Clyde Geronimi; Manuel Moreno; Ray Abrams; Fred Avery; Lester Kline; Vet Anderson; Pinto Colvig
- Color process: Black and white
- Distributed by: Universal Pictures
- Release date: October 12, 1931
- Running time: 6:30
- Language: English

The Hunter is a 1931 short animated film by Walter Lantz Productions and stars Oswald the Lucky Rabbit. It is the 48th Oswald short of the Lantz era and the 100th in the entire series.

== Plot ==
Oswald is on a horse, riding through the outdoors and blowing his trumpet. Here, he is seen wearing a shirt for the first time. Also joining him in his adventure is a brown slender dog, running along.

At a site not too faraway, a live girl teddy bear is keeping herself in shape by having her waist shuffled by a moving towel. The towel's ends are attached to the back of a shaky automobile. Meanwhile, her little brother hops on the car's front seat for a moment and jumps off, but accidentally moves a switch. As a result, the automobile was shaken too much for her liking, and she calls for help. Oswald picks up the distress call and comes to her aid. For some reason, Oswald fires his gun at the vehicle, stopping it completely. The teddy bear was relieved of her trouble and was most thankful.

Oswald and the teddy bear befriended each other. As the rabbit greets her goodbye to carry on in his journey, the beautiful bruin asks him where he is heading. Oswald then tells he is on a hunting trip. Finding his activity interesting, the teddy bear requests him to get her a fox skin. Oswald agrees to her wish.

Oswald and his dog set off in their horse to hunt for a fox. The fox in the area knows of their purpose, and therefore thinks of ways to keep them at bay. Minutes later, they were standing side-by-side, looking for their targeted animal. Without the two knowing, the fox comes up behind them and ties the dog's tail around Oswald's leg. The fox then kicks Oswald in the rear, prompting the rabbit to send the dog into a chase. In this, Oswald was pulled several yards away. His ride on the dog's tail would end as they ran into a residential gate.

Just to toy with its pursuers, the fox steps on mud then walks on the ground, leaving a trail of its footprints. Oswald and the dog follow the tracks which lead to a tree, and Oswald goes for a climb. The rabbit reaches the top but finds nothing. It appears that the fox was actually on the ground as it ties the dog's tail around a wooden spike and goes on to shake the tree. Oswald then drops to ground, and the fox flees the scene.

Oswald chases the fox into a house. As he enters, the fox leaps out from a window and closes the door. Thinking the rabbit has lost track, the fox stands and laughs just beside the entrance. All of a sudden, however, Oswald comes back out. Thus the fox ends up smashed by the door and pressed against the house's front wall. Just then, the teddy bear comes to Oswald, asking him if he got the fox skin she requested. Oswald then peels the flattened fox off the house and puts it on her like a scarf. Oswald and the teddy bear consider going on a date together.

== See also ==
- Oswald the Lucky Rabbit filmography
