= Radio Rhythm =

1931 film

- Directed by: Walter Lantz; Bill Nolan
- Produced by: Walter Lantz
- Starring: Pinto Colvig; Tex Avery; Shirley Reed
- Music by: James Dietrich
- Animation by: Clyde Geronimi; Manuel Moreno; Ray Abrams; Fred Avery; Lester Kline; Chet Karrberg; Pinto Colvig
- Color process: Black and white
- Production company: Walter Lantz Productions
- Distributed by: Universal Pictures
- Release date: July 27, 1931
- Running time: 5:56
- Language: English

Radio Rhythm is a 1931 short animated film featuring Oswald the Lucky Rabbit. It is among the vast majority of Oswald cartoons produced by Walter Lantz Productions. It is the 45th Lantz Oswald cartoon and the 97th cartoon in total.

== Plot ==
Oswald is a radio personality who runs a radio station R-A-Z-Z. Individuals with musical talents are selected before they perform there. The first performers consists of a rat, a horse, and a ram who sing the song And If You See Our Darling Nellie. Their act is well received by the live spectators.

The next to perform is a porcupine with a cello, but because the porcupine's performance is drab, an animated microphone decides to help out by taking and playing the instrument in a more upbeat fashion. When he gets back the cello and continues to play poorly, the porcupine gets removed from the picture.

Oswald then turns to a jazz band which performs the song One More Time. The rabbit even plays along as he takes and plays a piano. Some musicians and listeners sing to it.

As Oswald plays another tune on his piano, a male donkey decides to take a female cow for a date. When the couple enter a saloon, the donkey gets hurled out of the place by a bull who wants to take the female cow. The thrown donkey lands on and smashes Oswald's piano. Oswald then declares an end to his station's broadcast, but the audience then made a raspberry at Oswald as the cartoon ends.

== See also ==
- One More Time, a Merrie Melodies cartoon which also uses the song One More Time.
