= Mexico (film) =

1930 film

- Title card
- Directed by: Walter Lantz; Bill Nolan
- Produced by: Walter Lantz
- Starring: Pinto Colvig
- Music by: James Dietrich
- Animation by: Clyde Geronimi; Manuel Moreno; Ray Abrams; Fred Avery; Lester Kline; Pinto Colvig
- Color process: Black and white
- Production company: Walter Lantz Productions
- Distributed by: Universal Pictures
- Release date: November 17, 1930
- Running time: 5:42
- Language: English

Mexico is a 1930 short animated film by Walter Lantz Productions and stars Oswald the Lucky Rabbit. The soundtrack of the cartoon was missing for many years, until the discovery of a sound print in 2013. Then in 2014 the soundtrack version of the cartoon was uploaded to YouTube, but was deleted due to the YouTube account being terminated. In 2015 and 2016 two other youtubers uploaded the soundtrack version of the cartoon.

== Plot ==
Full short (Guild/Firelight reissue)

Oswald and a big bear are competing each other in a cockfight. While the bear's rooster is larger and stronger, Oswald's is more agile. After his cock gets knocked down by a hard impact, Oswald feeds it some special seeds. The seeds benefit the rabbit's chicken significantly until the bear's is taken down for good.

Following his victory at the cockfighting event, Oswald is being paraded in a limousine. On the way, he spots a female cat whom he finds very attractive. Oswald jumps out of the car and comes to her. After a brief conversation, the rabbit and the cat become friends and start dancing around.

Back at the cockfighting arena, the bear is depressed by his defeat and doesn't know what to do next. He tries to get his rooster back on its feet, only to see it fall again. The disgruntled bear then walks out and decides to take his frustration on Oswald.

The film scene returns to Oswald who is still dancing around with the cat. Just then, the bear rushes in and confronts him. The bear tries to attack with a kick but Oswald cleverly catches the assailant's leg. The rabbit then takes off the bear's boot and tickles its foot, therefore incapacitating the bear who laughs uncontrollably. The bear attempts another assault, only to be tickled off by Oswald in the abdomen. In no time, Oswald's rooster comes in and tickles the bear out of the picture. Oswald then resumes his date with the cat and make out.
