= The Bandmaster (1931 film) =

1931 film

- Title card
- Directed by: Walter Lantz; Bill Nolan
- Produced by: Walter Lantz
- Music by: James Dietrich
- Animation by: Clyde Geronimi; Manuel Moreno; Ray Abrams; Tex Avery; Lester Kline; Chet Karrberg; Pinto Colvig
- Color process: Black and white
- Production company: Walter Lantz Productions
- Distributed by: Universal Pictures
- Release date: May 18, 1931
- Running time: 6:04
- Language: English

The Bandmaster is a 1931 short film by Walter Lantz Productions, starring Oswald the Lucky Rabbit. As with a few films from the series, the cartoon is in the public domain. A similarly titled short, also produced by Lantz in 1947, is still under copyright however.

== Plot ==
The short film.

On the street, Oswald leads a handful of musicians whose devotedness towards him varies. Although the performance of the band showed some flaws, it mattered little to Oswald who simply carries on. Suddenly, the musicians decided to have a break inside the tavern, much to the rabbit's surprise. Oswald tries to follow them to that adult place, only to be pushed back out.

Without a group to lead, the lonely Oswald wonders further on the street. He then notices a flock of birds on some powerlines, chirping and making various sounds. In no time the rabbit was elated, knowing he found something he could conduct as he starts swinging his hands. But the beautiful sight did not last long when a disturbed squirrel comes out of a post and pulls up a switch that electrocutes the birds.

Somewhere within the area, a nurse tells her son to stay put in the stroller just before leaving. The boy isn't accustomed to being left alone, even for a few minutes, and therefore starts bawling. Oswald came by and decides to cheer up the child. The rabbit then picks up a discarded water pipe and plays it like a wind instrument. Various objects came to life and went dancing to Oswald's music, but the infant was less impressed. The nurse returns to the scene after several minutes. The naive nurse thought Oswald is disturbing the child with the sound and therefore pounds the rabbit in the noggin. While Oswald remains dazed on the pavement, the boy, however, has become a delighted character and begins to giggle.
