= The Fireman (1931 film) =

1931 film

- Directed by: Walter Lantz; Bill Nolan
- Produced by: Walter Lantz
- Starring: Pinto Colvig; Shirley Reed
- Music by: James Dietrich
- Animation by: Clyde Geronimi; Manuel Moreno; Ray Abrams; Fred Avery; Lester Kline; Chet Karrberg; Charles Hastings; Pinto Colvig
- Color process: Black and white
- Production company: Walter Lantz Productions
- Distributed by: Universal Pictures
- Release date: April 6, 1931
- Running time: 6:43
- Language: English

The Fireman is a short, animated film distributed by Universal Pictures and stars Oswald the Lucky Rabbit. It is the 39th Oswald film by Walter Lantz Productions and the 95th in the entire series.

== Plot ==
Oswald and his girlfriend Sadie (known as Kitty in this short) are stowing away on a fire truck. As the fire truck runs a slightly rough ride, Oswald and Sadie fall off the vehicle. after a chase for the truck an orphan kitten comes to the scene, desperately wanting to be with them. Oswald is not a big fan of this cat but decides to play with the little kitten for a moment. Oswald and the cat go on to play hide and seek where in Oswald will hide, and the kitten will try to find them. Oswald takes Sadie and Trys to run as far they could while the kitten is counting but as soon as Oswald thinks he's safe the kitten is randomly behind a tree. Oswald tries to chase the kitten, but it is too fast.

Oswald and Sadie continue walking where they find the firemen are having a beer party being held at some fairgrounds. After drinking the beer, the hippo from Amateur Nite starts singing three blind mice. of course, the three blind mice appear soon after. The three mice come to them to ask for spare change. Oswald is kind to give each rat a nickel. the orphan kitten, however, is quite rude as the kitten steals the rodents' coins.

The mice, who are very annoyed, start chasing the kitten. The kitten tries to hide in a log but only half of him goes in. The rodents begin striking the kitten in the rear with their polo mallets, and Oswald and Sadie laughs. To get back at the mice, the kitten uses a knife to slice off their tails. The mice, however, are able to fuse back their tails. To get back at Oswald, the kitten moves a giant mouse trap behind the rabbit. The mouse trap snaps on Oswald's bottom not once but two times. the kitten laughs as the short ends.
