= The Stone Age (film) =

1931 film

- Directed by: Walter Lantz; Bill Nolan
- Produced by: Walter Lantz
- Starring: Fred Avery
- Music by: James Dietrich
- Animation by: Clyde Geronimi; Manuel Moreno; Ray Abrams; Fred Avery; Lester Kline; Chet Karrberg; Pinto Colvig
- Color process: Black and white
- Production company: Walter Lantz Productions
- Distributed by: Universal Pictures
- Release date: July 13, 1931
- Running time: 5:57
- Language: English

The Stone Age is a 1931 short animated film by Walter Lantz Productions and one of many featuring Oswald the Lucky Rabbit.

== Plot ==
Everybody is a caveman, but while they wear animal hide, they also wear shoes that are rather modern day in style.

Oswald is riding outdoors on a wooden scooter, looking for a girl to date with. He then comes to a house with an escalator resembling a dinosaur with fins. Coming down to him is a girl kitty in high heeled pumps. While they walk together for a few seconds, a big bear sneaks from beside, and pounds the girl kitty in the head with a club. Instead of lying unconscious, the kitty falls in love with the bear who takes her away and Oswald is quite surprised.

Oswald learns that a girl would adore a guy who bashes her in the head. He then goes around some more to find another date. When Oswald attempts to pound someone, another guy tricks him not to do so, and therefore uses the trick to pound and win that girl. In another attempt, Oswald manages to pound a lady to adoring him, only to find her unattractive. Oswald then heads to some fair grounds where a high striker is being featured.

Oswald comes to the machine to test his strength. After two failed tries, he sees the bear and the kitty come by. When the bear decides to play the machine, Oswald ties a string between the rock on the game's lever and the bear's foot. As the bear strikes the other end of the lever, that mustelid ends up hitting the bell head first before going fainted. Oswald then pounds the girl kitty in the head with the game's mallet. The kitty reverts to her affection for Oswald.
