= Africa (1930 film) =

African American 1930 film

- Title card
- Directed by: Walter Lantz
- Story by: Walter Lantz; Bill Nolan
- Produced by: Walter Lantz
- Starring: Pinto Colvig
- Music by: James Dietrich
- Animation by: Clyde Geronimi; Manuel Moreno; Ray Abrams; Tex Avery; Lester Kline
- Color process: Black and white
- Production company: Universal Cartoon Studios
- Distributed by: Universal Pictures
- Release date: December 1, 1930
- Running time: 5:40
- Language: English

Africa is a 1930 Walter Lantz cartoon short featuring Oswald the Lucky Rabbit.

== Plot ==
Full short

Oswald is riding through the Egyptian desert on his camel. The camel, though looking real on the exterior, is actually mechanical because of the two ball-shaped pistons inside which Oswald manipulates with his feet like bike pedals. One day, a lion was running toward them. To defend himself, Oswald brought out a rifle but it malfunctioned. As a final resort, Oswald fires the ball pistons from the camel like a cannon and aims into the lion's mouth. Terrified by its lumpy back, the lion runs away in panic.

Nearby where he is, Oswald sees an oasis and a palace. Upon seeing the apes dance and play instruments, the curious rabbit decides to join the fun. As he enters the palace, Oswald is greeted by the queen. The queen asks him who he is, and Oswald introduces himself in a song as well as giving advice for a possibly better lifestyle. Pleased by his visit, the queen asks Oswald if he would like to be her king. Oswald is at first uncertain, knowing he never met a queen, but immediately accepts. It turns out momentarily that the queen still has a king who shows up, then kicks Oswald out of the palace and into a pond full of crocodiles. Luckily, Oswald escapes unscathed and runs off into the desert.

== Notes ==
Oswald's theme song is featured for the first time in this film. The song was briefly shown again at the beginning of Alaska, the following cartoon, as well as in Mars which was released in the same year.

== Reused footage ==
Some of the scenes in Africa were taken from the 1930 musical film King of Jazz.

== See also ==
- Oswald the Lucky Rabbit filmography
