= Bandmaster (disambiguation) =

A bandmaster is the leader and conductor of a band, usually a military or marching band.

Bandmaster may also refer to:

== Films ==
- The Band Master (1917 film), a silent film
- The Bandmaster (1930 film), a Krazy Kat short
- The Bandmaster (1931 film), an Oswald the Lucky Rabbit cartoon
- Band Master, a 1993 Tamil-language film

== Equipment ==
- Fender Bandmaster, an amplifier made by Fender
- Fender Bandmaster Reverb, an amplifier made by Fender
