= Country School =

1931 film

- Directed by: Walter Lantz; Bill Nolan
- Produced by: Walter Lantz
- Music by: James Dietrich
- Animation by: Clyde Geronimi; Manuel Moreno; Ray Abrams; Tex Avery; Lester Kline; Chet Karrberg; Pinto Colvig
- Color process: Black and white
- Production company: Walter Lantz Productions
- Distributed by: Universal Pictures
- Release date: May 5, 1931
- Language: English

Country School is a 1931 animated short film by Walter Lantz Productions and stars Oswald the Lucky Rabbit.

== Plot ==
Oswald and his girlfriend Kitty are going to school, but are late. The teacher later plays a song for all of the students, but a hippo blows a raspberry at the teacher and puts a balloon in Oswald's shorts, so the teacher smacks Oswald, at which the balloon burst. The teacher announces that school is dismissed, then finally everyone runs back home.
