= Country School (disambiguation) =

Country School is a 1931 short film.

Country School may also refer to:

- Country School, a K–3 elementary school in Weston, Massachusetts
- New Canaan Country School, a Preschool–9 private school in New Canaan, Connecticut

== See also ==
- One-room school
