= Clyde Geronimi =

American animator and film director (1901–1989)

- Born: Clito Enrico Geronimi; June 12, 1901; Chiavenna, Italy
- Died: April 24, 1989 (aged 87); Newport Beach, California, U.S.
- Other name: Gerry Geronimi
- Occupation: Animation director
- Employer(s): J.R. Bray Studios (1924–1928); Universal Cartoon Studios (1928–1931); Walt Disney Productions (1931–1959); UPA (1959–1967); Grantray-Lawrence Animation (1967–68)
- Awards: Disney Legend

Clito "Clyde" Geronimi (June 12, 1901 – April 24, 1989), known as Gerry, was an Italian-American animation director. He is best known for his work at Walt Disney Productions.

== Biography ==
Geronimi was born in Chiavenna, Italy, immigrating to the United States as a young child. Geronimi's earliest work in the animation field was for the J.R. Bray Studios, where he worked with Walter Lantz.

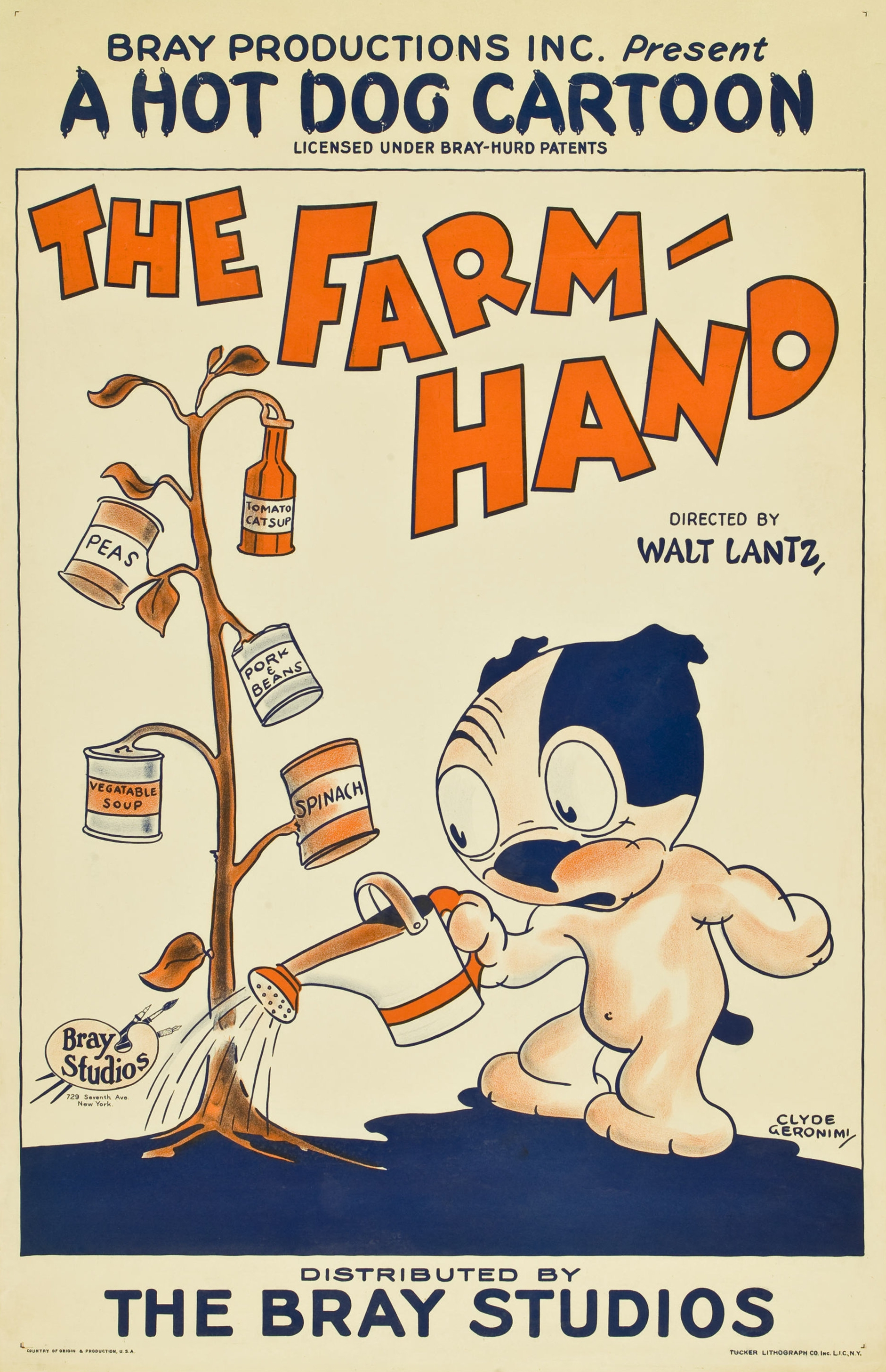
Poster for a cartoon that Geronimi animated in 1927

Upon the dissolution of the Bray Studio in 1928, Geronimi followed Lantz to his own studio, Walter Lantz Productions, producing cartoons for Universal Pictures. Geronimi left Lantz in 1931 to join Walt Disney Productions, where he remained until 1959. Geronimi started off in the shorts department as an animator, eventually becoming a director. His 1941 short, Lend a Paw, won the Academy Award for Best Animated Short Film. During World War II, he directed several propaganda films, like Education for Death (1943) and the feature film Victory Through Air Power (1943).

Geronimi moved into directing feature-length animated films after the end of World War II, mainly working for Walt Disney Productions. He was one of the directors on Bambi, Cinderella, Alice in Wonderland, Peter Pan, Lady and the Tramp, Sleeping Beauty, and One Hundred and One Dalmatians.

After Geronimi left Disney in 1959, he worked in television for a number of years (mostly at UPA), including directing many episodes of the 1967 animated Spider-Man series. He retired from animation sometime in the late 1960s, and provided illustrations for children's books.

Geronimi received the 1978 Winsor McCay Award from the International Animated Film Society, ASIFA-Hollywood, for his lifetime of contributions to the animation field. The award was presented by his long-time friend and colleague Walter Lantz. Geronimi was also posthumously inducted as a Disney Legend on July 14, 2017.

Geronimi died on April 24, 1989, at his home in Newport Beach, California, aged 87.

== Filmography ==
=== Shorts ===
==== Walter Lantz Productions period ====
- The Pied Piper (Short) (assistant animator) (1924)
- The Giant Killer (Short) (assistant animator) (1924)
- The Magic Lamp (Short) (assistant animator) (1924)
- Dinky Doodle in a Restaurant (Short) (assistant animator) (1925)
- Dinky Doodle in the Circus (Short) (assistant animator) (1925)
- How the Camel Got His Hump (Short) (assistant animator) (1925)
- Dinky Doodle in the Hunt (Short) (assistant animator) (1925)
- How the Bear Got His Short Tail (Short) (assistant animator) (1925)
- Dinky Doodle and the Bad Man (Short) (assistant animator) (1925)
- How the Elephant Got His Trunk (Short) (assistant animator) (1925)
- Just Spooks (Short) (assistant animator) (1925)
- The Babes in the Woods (Short) (assistant animator) (1925)
- Three Bears (Short) (assistant animator) (1925)
- Robinson Crusoe (Short) (assistant animator) (1925)
- Magic Carpet (Short) (assistant animator) (1925)
- Peter Pan Handled (Short) (assistant animator) (1925)
- The House That Dinky Built (Short) (assistant animator) (1925)
- Cinderella (Short) (assistant animator) (1925)
- Little Red Riding Hood (Short) (assistant animator) (1925)
- The Cat's Nine Lives (Short) (animator) (1926)
- The Pig's Curly Tail (Short) (animator and writer) (1926)
- Dinky Doodle in the Army (Short) (assistant animator) (1926)
- Dog Gone It (Short) (assistant director) (1926)
- The Magician (Short) (assistant animator) (1926)
- Dinky Doodle's Little Orphan (Short) (assistant animator) (1926)
- Dinky Doodle's Bed Time Story (Short) (assistant animator) (1926)
- Wild-West (Short) (assistant animator) (1926)
- The Ostrich's Plumes (Short) (assistant animator) (1926)
- Dinky Doodle in Egypt (Short) (assistant animator) (1926)
- The King of Beasts (Short) (assistant animator) (1926)
- The Arctic (Short) (assistant animator) (1926)
- Dinky Doodle in Lost and Found (Short) (assistant animator) (1926)
- Dinky Doodle in Uncle Tom's Cabin (Short) (assistant animator) (1926)
- How the Giraffe Got His Long Neck (Short) (assistant animator) (1926)
- The Goat's Whiskers (Short) (assistant animator) (1926)
- Hyena's Laugh (animator) (1926)
- For the Love O' Pete (assistant director) (1926)
- Pete's Haunted House (assistant director) (1926)
- Pete's Party (assistant director) (1926)
- Lunch Hound (animator) (1927)
- Mars (Short) (animator) (1930)
- Alaska (Short) (animator) (1930)
- Africa (Short) (animator) (1930)
- Mexico (Short) (animator) (1930)
- The Navy (Short) (animator) (1930)
- The Fowl Ball (Short) (animator) (1930)
- The Detective (Short) (animator) (1930)
- The Singing Sap (Short) (animator) (1930)
- Cold Feet (Short) (animator and writer) (1930)
- Snappy Salesman (Short) (animator and writer) (1930)
- Henpecked (Short) (animator and writer) (1930)
- Spooks (Short) (animator and writer) (1930)
- Not So Quiet (Short) (animator and writer) (1930)
- My Pal Paul (Short) (animator and writer) (1930)
- Hells Heels (Short) (animator and writer) (1930)
- Hot for Hollywood (Short) (animator and writer) (1930)
- The Prison Panic (Short) (animator and writer) (1930)
- The Hunter (Short) (animator) (1931)
- Kentucky Belles (Short) (animator) (1931)
- Radio Rhythm (Short) (animator) (1931)
- The Stone Age (Short) (animator and artist) (1931)
- Northwoods (Short) (animator) (1931)
- The Bandmaster (Short) (animator) (1931)
- Country School (Short) (animator) (1931)
- Sunny South (Short) (artist) (1931)
- The Fireman (Short) (animator) (1931)
- The Farmer (Short) (animator) (1931)
- What a Doctor! (Short) (animator – uncredited) (1931)
- Shipwreck (Short) (animator) (1931)
- College (Short) (animator) (1931)
- China (Short) (animator) (1931)

==== Disney period ====
- The Ugly Duckling (animator – uncredited) (1931)
- Mickey's Orphans (Short) (animator – uncredited) (1931)
- Mickey Cuts Up (Short) (animator – uncredited) (1931)
- The Beach Party (Short) (animator – uncredited) (1931)
- Mickey's Good Deed (Short) (animator – uncredited) (1932)
- Santa's Workshop (animator – uncredited) (1932)
- The Klondike Kid (Short) (animator – uncredited) (1932)
- Trader Mickey (Short) (animator – uncredited) (1932)
- Flowers and Trees (Short) (animator – uncredited) (1932)
- Just Dogs (animator – uncredited) (1932)
- Mickey in Arabia (Short) (animator – uncredited) (1932)
- Mickey's Revue (Short) (animator – uncredited) (1932)
- The Duck Hunt (Short) (animator – uncredited) (1932)
- Giantland (animator – uncredited) (1933)
- The Steeple Chase (Short) (animator – uncredited) (1933)
- Old king Cole (Short) (animator – uncredited) (1933)
- Mickey's Mechanical Man (Short) (animator – uncredited) (1933)
- Father Noah's Ark (Short) (animator – uncredited) (1933)
- Mickey's Mellerdrammer (Short) (animator – uncredited) (1933)
- Birds in the Spring (Short) (animator – uncredited) (1933)
- Building a Building (Short) (animator – uncredited) (1933)
- The Dognapper (Short) (animator – uncredited) (1934)
- The Goddess of Spring (animator – uncredited) (1934)
- Peculiar Penguins (Short) (animator – uncredited) (1934)
- The Wise Little Hen (Short) (animator – uncredited) (1934)
- The Big Bad Wolf (Short) (animator – uncredited) (1934)
- Shanghaied (Short) (animator – uncredited) (1934)
- Cock o' the Walk (Short) (animator) (1935)
- Music Land (Short) (animator – uncredited) (1935)
- Pluto's Judgement Day (Short) (animator) (1935)
- Who Killed Cock Robin? (Short) (animator – uncredited) (1935)
- Mickey's Kangaroo (Short) (animator – uncredited) (1935)
- The Band Concert (Short) (animator – uncredited)
- Mickey's Man Friday (Short) (animator – uncredited) (1934)
- Mother Pluto (Short) (animator – uncredited) (1936)
- Three Blind Mouseketeers (animator – uncredited) (1936)
- Mickey's Rival (animator – uncredited) (1936)
- Lonesome Ghosts (Short) (animator – uncredited) (1937)
- Moose Hunters (Short) (animator – uncredited) (1937)
- The Fox Hunt (Short) (animator – uncredited) (1938)
- Mickey's Trailer (animator – uncredited) (1938)
- Boat Builders (animator – uncredited) (1938)
- Society Dog Show (animator – uncredited) (1939)
- Mickey's Parrot (director) (1938)
- The Ugly Duckling (director) (1939)
- Beach Picnic (director) (1939)
- Officer Duck (director) (1939)
- The Pointer (director) (1939)
- Mr. Mouse Takes a Trip (director) (1940)
- Pantry Pirate (director) (1940)
- Billposters (director) (1940)
- Tugboat Mickey (director) (1940)
- Pluto's Dream House (director) (1940)
- Lend a Paw (director) (1941)
- Canine Caddy (director) (1941)
- A Gentleman's Gentleman (director) (1941)
- Pluto Junior (director) (1942)
- The Army Mascot (director) (1942)
- T-Bone for Two (director) (1942)
- Pluto at the Zoo (director) (1942)
- The Sleep Walker (director) (1942)
- Private Pluto (director) (1943)
- Education for Death (director) (1943)
- Chicken Little (director) (1943)
- Victory Through Air Power (Deputy director) (1943)
- Pluto and the Armadillo (director) (1943)
- The Big Wash (director) (1948)
- Susie the Little Blue Coupe (director) (1952)
- The Story of Anyburg U.S.A. (director) (1956)

=== Feature films ===
- Dumbo (assistant director – uncredited) (1941)
- Bambi (assistant director – uncredited) (1942)
- The Three Caballeros (director) (1944)
- Make Mine Music (Peter and the Wolf, The Whale Who Wanted to Sing at the Met segments) (director) (1946)
- Melody Time (Little Toot, Blame It on the Samba, Pecos Bill segments) (director) (1948)
- The Adventures of Ichabod and Mr. Toad (The Legend of Sleepy Hollow segment) (director) (1949)
- Cinderella (director) (1950)
- Alice in Wonderland (director) (1951)
- Peter Pan (director) (1953)
- Lady and the Tramp (director) (1955)
- Sleeping Beauty (1959)
- One Hundred and One Dalmatians (1961)

=== TV ===
- Mister Magoo (TV series) (direction) (1960)
- The Dick Tracy Show (TV series) (direction) (1961)
  - The Big Seal Steal
  - The Bird Brain Pickers
  - The Onion Ring
  - The Parrot Caper
  - The Platterpuss Plot
  - The Retouchables
  - Rocket 'n' Roll
  - The Skyscraper Caper
  - Trick or Treat
- Spider-Man (TV series) (direction) (1967)
- Disneyland (TV series) (sequence director – 1 episode)
  - How the West Was Lost (1967) (sequence director)
- Funny Is Funny (Short) (animation director) (1966)
- Linus the Lionhearted (TV Series) (animation director) (1964)
  - Water Skiing (The Company)
  - Macy's Thanksgiving Day Balloon (The Company)
  - Hide and Seek (The Company)
  - Musical Chairs (The Company)
  - Swami Bird (Linus, King of Beasts)
  - Rocky Road to Riches (Linus, King of Beasts)
  - Birds Gotta Swim (Linus, King of Beasts)
  - Bye, Bye, Bad Bird (Rory Raccoon)
  - Make Someone Happy (Rory Raccoon)
  - Vincent Van Crow (Rory Raccoon)
  - So-Hi and the Bamboo Stalk (So-Hi)
  - The Night Before Christmas (So-Hi)
  - The Bear Who Danced Too Well (So-Hi)
  - So-Hi and the Knight (So-Hi)
  - The Princely Toad (So-Hi)
  - Little Red So-Hihood (So-Hi)
  - The Giant With Two Glass Jaws (So-Hi)
  - The Business-Like Witch (So-Hi)
  - The Wolf Who Changed His Spots (So-Hi)
  - CinderSo-Hi (So-Hi)
  - E.R. Jack Rumplestiltskin (So-Hi)
  - The Poet Bandit (So-Hi)
  - The Walrus and the Carpenter (So-Hi)
  - The Cat Who Looked At A Queen (So-Hi)
  - Truly Chewy (Lovable Truly)
  - Truly Scarey (Lovable Truly)
  - Be Kind To Dogs (Lovable Truly)
  - Puncture Time (Lovable Truly)
  - Flop Flop (Lovable Truly)
