= Aloha Hooey =

1942 film by Fred Avery

- Title card
- Directed by: Fred Avery (uncredited)
- Story by: Michael Maltese
- Produced by: Leon Schlesinger
- Starring: Mel Blanc; Pinto Colvig
- Music by: Carl W. Stalling
- Animation by: Virgil Ross
- Color process: Technicolor
- Production company: Leon Schlesinger Productions
- Distributed by: Warner Bros. Pictures
- Release date: January 30, 1942
- Running time: 7 min
- Country: United States
- Language: English

Aloha Hooey is a 1942 American animated comedy short film directed by Fred Avery. The cartoon was released on January 30, 1942. It is part of the Merrie Melodies series. It was the final cartoon to be directed by Avery for the studio, one in numerous Avery-directed shorts with post-production finished by Bob Clampett after his departure, as well as one in numerous non-Disney shorts to feature Pinto Colvig imitating Goofy.

== Plot ==
Sammy Seagull, a Popeye-like seagull, and Cecil Crow, a crow from Oakville, Iowa, stow away on the same lifeboat. Cecil desires to see a hula dancer, which is his sole motivation for stowing away in the first place. The cruise ship the lifeboat is on sails past a tropical island where they spot a hula dancer.

Sammy and Cecil then compete for her affections by bringing her pearls and flying with a cigar to create symbols. Cecil fails spectacularly but saves Sammy from drowning in an attempt to save Cecil from drowning. Cecil accidentally lands in a shark during a diving contest then into a sea turtle. A starfish then latches on Cecil and beats him up.

A gorilla named "I'm the Villain As You Didn't Know" abducts the hula dancer, prompting Cecil to beat him effortlessly behind a bush. Cecil and the hula dancer fall in love and leave the island and Sammy behind after having children.
