= The Pointer =

1939 Mickey Mouse cartoon

- Theatrical release poster
- Directed by: Clyde Geronimi
- Produced by: Walt Disney
- Starring: Walt Disney; Pinto Colvig
- Color process: Technicolor
- Production company: Walt Disney Productions
- Distributed by: RKO Radio Pictures
- Release date: July 21, 1939
- Running time: 9 minutes
- Country: United States
- Language: English

The Pointer is an American animated short film produced by Walt Disney Productions and released by RKO Radio Pictures on July 21, 1939, shown in theaters with Way Down South. The short was directed by Clyde Geronimi and animated by Fred Moore, Frank Thomas, Lynn Karp, Seamus Culhane, Ollie Johnston, Preston Blair, Lester Norvi, John Lounsbery, Claude Smitha, Art Palmer, and Josh Meador. The film was nominated for an Academy Award for Best Short Subject (Cartoon) in 1940. It was the 106th short in the Mickey Mouse film series to be released, and the third for that year.

The cartoon follows Mickey Mouse as he tries to teach his dog Pluto to be a pointer dog during a quail hunt. It was directed by Clyde Geronimi and features the voices of Walt Disney as Mickey and Lee Millar as Pluto.

Although often cited as the animated debut of Mickey's modern character design, this actually occurred six months earlier in The Standard Parade of 1939. Nevertheless, The Pointer is still considered a milestone Mickey Mouse film for its background art and Mickey's acting which was personally staged by Walt Disney. The film was nominated for the Academy Award for Best Animated Short Film at the 12th Academy Awards in 1940, but ultimately lost to Disney's own The Ugly Duckling, the final installment of the Silly Symphony series.

== Plot ==
Mickey Mouse and Pluto are camping in the woods about to set out hunting. Mickey reads to Pluto from an instructional book how to point at game and not move. Mickey promises that if they are successful they will have "quail on toast, and maybe a nice big juicy bear steak" that night. After Mickey tosses aside a can of beans in favor of their target meal, they set out into the forest, Mickey carrying a shotgun.

The first time they see quail, Pluto gets too excited, knocks Mickey over, and scares the birds away. Mickey scolds Pluto, but later softens, realizing that Pluto is a mutt and won't be able to learn. They set off again, but become separated. Pluto again hears some quail, and points at them. He is careful this time not to move at all, even to the point of letting the quail jump up on him and pull his fur. Mickey however is unaware that Pluto is not right behind him. He jumps down from a rock and unwittingly wakes a sleeping bear who starts to follow him. Only when Mickey doubles around and comes across Pluto, still in his pointer position, does he realize that there is a bear behind him.

The bear appears to be belligerent, but rather than running away, Mickey first tries to talk to the bear, explaining that he and Pluto were only hunting quail. Mickey even introduces himself to the bear, saying "I hope you've heard of me".

The bear instead chases after Mickey and Pluto, who tear a path across the landscape back to their camp. That night they happily eat a supper of canned beans.

== Use in other media ==
Animation of Mickey whistling and walking through the woods was reused in the Disneyland episode "Tricks of Our Trade" in 1957. For this appearance, Pluto was omitted, and Mickey was redrawn having different clothes and carrying a fishing pole instead of a shotgun.

== Voice cast ==
- Mickey Mouse: Walt Disney
- Pluto: Pinto Colvig (archive sound)

== Releases ==
- 1939 - theatrical release
- 1954 - Disneyland, episode #1.1: "The Disneyland Story" (TV)
- 1961 - Walt Disney's Wonderful World of Color, episode #8.5: "The Hunting Instinct" (TV)
- c. 1983 - Good Morning, Mickey!, episode #9 (TV)
- 1997 - The Ink and Paint Club, episode #1.2: "Mickey's Landmarks" (TV)

== Home media ==
The short was released on May 18, 2004, on Walt Disney Treasures: Mickey Mouse in Living Color, Volume Two: 1939-Today.

Additional releases include:

- 1983 - "Cartoon Classics: Pluto" (VHS)
- 2006 - "Funny Factory with Mickey Mouse" (DVD)
- 2011 - iTunes (digital download)

== See also ==
- Mickey Mouse (film series)
