= Moose Hunters =

1937 Mickey Mouse cartoon

- Title screen
- Directed by: Ben Sharpsteen
- Produced by: Walt Disney
- Starring: Pinto Colvig; Walt Disney; Clarence Nash
- Music by: Paul J. Smith
- Animation by: Art Babbitt; Frenchy De Tremaudan; Norman Ferguson; Clyde Geronimi; Jack Kinney
- Color process: Technicolor
- Production company: Walt Disney Productions
- Distributed by: United Artists
- Release date: February 20, 1937
- Running time: 8:40
- Country: United States
- Language: English

Moose Hunters is a 1937 American animated short film produced by Walt Disney Productions and released by United Artists. It was the 93rd short in the Mickey Mouse film series, and the fourth for that year. The cartoon stars Mickey Mouse, Donald Duck, and Goofy on a moose hunting expedition. It was directed by Ben Sharpsteen and features music by Paul J. Smith. The voice cast includes Walt Disney as Mickey, Clarence Nash as Donald, and Pinto Colvig as Goofy.

== Plot ==
Mickey, Donald, and Goofy go hunting for moose. Mickey instructs Donald and Goofy to distract a moose so he can shoot it, and they disguise themselves in a female moose costume to lure one.

They attract an Alaskan moose bull by spraying perfume on the costume and leading it toward Mickey. Meanwhile, Mickey encounters a Canadian moose bull. The Canadian moose becomes distracted by the disguised pair, but the Alaskan moose arrives and challenges it.

The two bulls begin to fight, forcing Donald and Goofy to flee. The moose soon realize the deception and chase them, with Mickey joining the escape. The trio ultimately flee by boat, ending the cartoon.

== Voice cast ==
- Mickey Mouse: Walt Disney
- Donald Duck: Clarence Nash
- Goofy, Moose: Pinto Colvig

== Home media ==
The short was released on December 4, 2001, on Walt Disney Treasures: Mickey Mouse in Living Color.

== In other media ==
Moose Hunters served as the basis, as well as title, for the third stage in the video game, Mickey Mania, which was released for the Super NES, Genesis, Sega CD and PlayStation (under the title Mickey's Wild Adventure).

== See also ==
- Mickey Mouse (film series)
