= Snowman's Land =

1939 film by Charles Jones

- Title card
- Directed by: Chuck Jones
- Story by: Dave Monahan
- Produced by: Leon Schlesinger
- Starring: Mel Blanc; Pinto Colvig
- Music by: Carl W. Stalling
- Animation by: Ken Harris
- Color process: Technicolor
- Production company: Leon Schlesinger Productions
- Distributed by: Warner Bros. Pictures
- Release date: July 29, 1939
- Running time: 7 min
- Country: United States
- Language: English

Snowman's Land is a 1939 American animated comedy short film directed by Charles Jones. The short was released on July 29, 1939. It is part of the Merrie Melodies series and as one in numerous non-Disney shorts to feature Pinto Colvig imitating Goofy.

== Plot ==
The Northeast Dismounted Police (a parody of the North-West Mounted Police) holds a meeting to strategize the capture of an outlaw named Dirty Pierre, only for the commander to incorrectly show a mugshot of himself before switching to his actual mugshot. None of the policemen are willing to engage the task and flee, except for a Goofy-like policeman who is too stupid to realize the situation's brevity.

The policeman drives a dog-powered sled and finds Pierre cutting his nails without realizing it is him. Pierre exploits the policeman's stupidity and pounds him into the snow before making his way to his cabin. The policeman recovers and charges into the cabin, destroying it except for the door. Pierre anticipates the policeman's timing and opens the door in order to avoid the hit, only for the policeman to roll into a snowball and knock him out too. They land on the headquarters and destroy it, where the commander is also scared of Pierre.
