= No Smoking (1951 film) =

1951 animated Goofy short by Jack Kinney

- Directed by: Jack Kinney
- Produced by: Walt Disney
- Starring: Pinto Colvig; Bob Jackman; John Sibley; Lance Nolley
- Narrated by: Jack Rourke
- Music by: Paul Smith
- Color process: Technicolor
- Production company: Walt Disney Productions
- Distributed by: RKO Radio Pictures
- Release date: November 23, 1951
- Running time: 6 minutes (one reel)
- Country: United States
- Language: English

No Smoking is a cartoon made by Walt Disney Productions in 1951, featuring Goofy. This cartoon is another short of the "Goofy the Everyman" series of the 1950s. This cartoon begins by tracing the brief history of smoking, including how Christopher Columbus brought tobacco to Europe from the Native Americans, and then moves on to Goofy, as "George Geef" in this cartoon, trying unsuccessfully to drop the smoking habit.

This cartoon, because of its content, including depictions of a firing squad, was kept off of TV broadcasts. It was eventually included as one of the cartoons featured in A Salute to Father (later renamed Goofy's Salute to Father), a 1961 episode of the Walt Disney anthology series, but the ending was changed to include an extra announcement with Goofy announcing that he quits smoking for good.

== Plot ==
In this cartoon, we start with flashbacks feature a "Goofy"-like version of Christopher Columbus, who is given a cigar by a Native American. His three ships bring it back to their country, with smoke floating from them. A man in Europe rolls a cigar with a leaf and a midget lights it with a small torch, and the impact of the popularity of smoking is shown.

Goofy, in the role of George Geef, who is an extreme nicotine addict, smokes various cigarettes, cigars and pipes during the evening and as he goes to bed (as a huge cloud of smoke covers his head), when he wakes up in the morning, he shaves, drinks coffee and goes at work. Soon his throat tickles and his eyes get irritated and he cannot blow out his matches, so he throws away all of his smoking products and decides to quit. It works fine at first, and feels he can do it.

Then the boss congratulates George for being able to quit smoking, and as he lights up a cigarette, he says "It ain't easy. If it was, I'd quit!" Another employee, who is now a father, nearly offers George a cigar in honor of the occasion, but then remembers that he quit smoking. Almost everyone at the office still smokes, and George admits that he loves smoking, and he babbles like crazy and runs out of the office like a madman, leading into the following montage.

=== George's search for a smoke ===
Throughout the rest of the cartoon, George is searching for a smoke, all the while yelling, "Smoke! Smoke! Smoke! Smoke! Smoke!" Here is where he finds them, only to be unsuccessful in smoking it in some way or another:

- He tries to go into a tobacco store, but it is now closed for lunch. He then swipes a cigar from the wooden Indian statue near the door. He is about to light it, but a voice (presumably the statue) calls out "Ugh!" and a well-thrown tomahawk splits the cigar in half.
- He finds some tobacco from a man filling his pipe and a small piece of paper. He catches the tobacco in the paper and tries to roll it, but fails and gets it everywhere.
- He tries to pick up a discarded cigar, but a foot steps on it, flattening it and gets his hand in the process, leaving an imprint on his hand that reads, "Pussyfoot". George yells in pain.
- He picks up another cigar near an elevator doorway, but a voice calls out "Goin' up!" and the door closes on the cigar and as the elevator rises, so does the cigar.
- He goes into a smoking room, but is kicked out because it is for women only.
- He tries to get a discarded cigarette, but a hobo has grabbed it at the same time. The hobo punches him in the nose.
- He tries to grab a cigar rolling down the street, and successfully grabs it, but it is now in a drainage grate ("I got it! I got it! Uh... I think I got it..."). His fingers accidentally let go of the cigar and it falls into the sewer.
- He grabs what he thinks is a cigar from a man with a bunch of them in his pockets, but, as he bites down on it, he realizes it is actually a fountain pen that is now leaking with ink.
- He picks up a white pipe-like object, but it gets blasted to bits as it is actually a target in an amusement park shooting gallery. A barker then says, "And the little man wins a big cigar!"
- He looks up to see a janitor on The Empire State Building drop a cigarette. He eagerly holds out his hand to get it, and even tries to use a ladder to get it when it briefly lands on the building's mid-section, but when he does, the cigarette bursts until nothing but ashes are left of it.
- Finally, he begs an elderly banker for any tobacco products he has on himself ("Hey mister, you got a cig, a fag, a pipe, nail, weed, rope or chaw or... cigar, or snuff, or anything?! Just anything!"); he gives him an exploding cigar, which George still smokes, while the narrator says, "Give a smoker enough rope, and... he'll hang on to his habit."

== Historical and cultural references ==
- One of the Goofys in this short is smoking a cigarette from "Phyllis Morrison", which is a parody of Phillip Morris. A subsequent Goofy skywrites an ad telling viewers to "Smoke LOOKYs", which parodies the advertising message, "Smoke LUCKYs" (Lucky Strike brand).
- Pinto Colvig had been a longtime smoker and was suffering with lung disease at the time this short was made. He was a pioneer in the effort to require warning labels on cigarette packages. Pinto died of lung cancer in 1967, almost a year after Walt Disney died from the same cause.

== Voice cast ==
- Goofy: Pinto Colvig

== Home media ==
The short was released on December 2, 2002 on Walt Disney Treasures: The Complete Goofy, with its original ending.
