= Mickey's Good Deed =

1932 film by Burt Gillett

- Theatrical release poster
- Directed by: Burt Gillett
- Produced by: Walt Disney
- Starring: Pinto Colvig; Walt Disney; Marcellite Garner
- Music by: Bert Lewis
- Color process: Black-and-white
- Production company: Walt Disney Productions
- Distributed by: United Artists
- Release date: December 17, 1932
- Running time: 8 min
- Country: United States
- Language: English

Mickey's Good Deed (also called Mickey's Lucky Break and Mickey Plays Santa in certain home media releases) is a 1932 American animated short film directed by Burt Gillett. It is the 50th film of the Mickey Mouse series and the first to use RCA Photophone sound, as Disney stopped using Cinephone due to it being a pirated version of Vitaphone used by Pat Powers, who Disney cut ties with years ago.

== Plot ==
A destitute Mickey Mouse appears as a street performer playing "O Come, All Ye Faithful" on a cello while Pluto howls along. Several people appear to throw coins in Mickey's collection cup and Mickey wishes them a merry Christmas. But when Mickey goes to buy food, he discovers to his dismay that his cup is full of nails, nuts, and bolts.

Eventually, Mickey comes to the home of a rich pig family and begins to play his cello outside. Inside the home, a spoiled pig boy named Adelbert keeps refusing different toys that his father and butler show him. Adelbert then throws a tantrum after seeing Pluto outside, demanding that he wants him. On the father's orders, the butler goes outside and persistently offers Mickey money for Pluto, but Mickey refuses. While running away, Mickey drops his cello and a horse-drawn sleigh runs it over destroying it. The apparently oblivious party in the sleigh call out a cheerful "Merry Christmas!" to Mickey and Pluto.

Mickey and Pluto later come across the home of a poor cat family. A mother sits at the table crying and Mickey and Pluto see from a picture that the father is in jail and she has no money for food or toys. Emotionally moved by the scene, Mickey returns to the rich home and reluctantly sells Pluto on the condition that he gets treated well. However, the family has no intention to do so as Adelbert starts abusing the dog to amuse himself while his father and butler victoriously shake hands. With the money, Mickey buys toys and food for the cat family and their mother, who is now snoring as he makes it back to their house and he delivers the goods dressed as Santa Claus. He barely manages to keep it quiet until he has snuck out of the house, just in time to see the children wake up to find all the toys he left. Mickey leaves satisfied that he helped the cat family in having a happy Christmas, though he feels depressed of selling away Pluto.

Meanwhile, Adelbert continues amusing himself by throwing objects at a panicking Pluto, causing the house to get messy and his father and butler to get hurt. The final straw is when Adelbert uses the Christmas tree as a slingshot to send Pluto flying in the air, causing the father to be struck in the butt by the star. Finally fed up with the messiness and chaos, the father orders the butler to throw Pluto out before proceeding to punish Adelbert by spanking him. Freed from Adelbert's abuse, Pluto happily follows Mickey's tracks to where he finds the lonely mouse sitting in front of a fire along with a snow sculpture of Pluto. Pluto burrows through the snow and pops his head out the top of the sculpture, surprising Mickey. The two friends happily share the pig family's roasted chicken for a Christmas dinner upon reuniting.

== Voice cast ==
- Mickey Mouse, Adelbert: Walt Disney
- Pluto, Adelbert's father, toy effects: Pinto Colvig
- Weeping mother, kittens: Marcellite Garner
- Butler: Lee Millar

== Home media ==
The short was released on December 7, 2004, on Walt Disney Treasures: Mickey Mouse in Black and White, Volume Two: 1929-1935.

Additional releases include:

- 1974 - Theatrical re-release by Buena Vista
- 1986 - "Jiminy Cricket's Christmas" (VHS)
- 2005 - "Holiday Celebration with Mickey & Pals" (colorized, DVD)

== See also ==
- Mickey Mouse (film series)
- List of Christmas films
