= Mickey's Revue =

1932 film by Wilfred Jackson

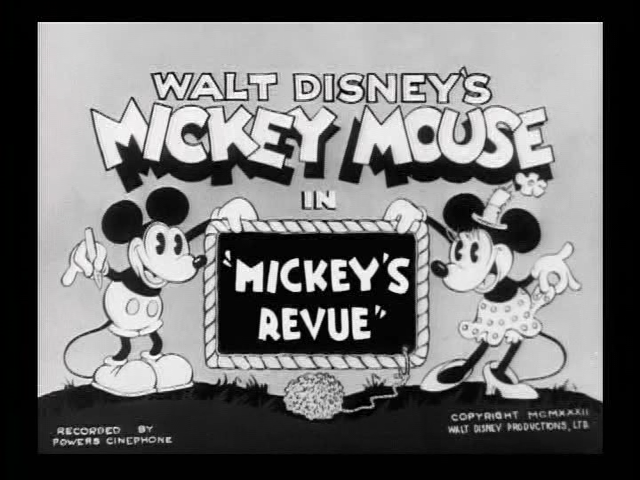
- Title card
- Directed by: Wilfred Jackson
- Produced by: Walt Disney
- Starring: Pinto Colvig; Lee Millar
- Color process: Black and White
- Production company: Walt Disney Productions
- Distributed by: Columbia Pictures
- Release date: May 27, 1932
- Running time: 7 min
- Country: United States
- Language: English

Mickey's Revue is a 1932 American animated short film directed by Wilfred Jackson. It is the 41st film of the Mickey Mouse series. It is the first appearance of a yokel character voiced by Pinto Colvig, soon to be known as Dippy Dawg and later Goofy.

== Plot ==
In a barnyard concert hall, Mickey Mouse is the conductor for a band of pigs and horses. In a ballet sequence, Minnie Mouse is a flying fairy, held aloft by Horace Horsecollar. Several dancing cows also feature in the performance, and Pluto makes an occasional appearance. In the audience, a witless yokel character annoys the audience by crunching a bag of peanuts and laughing loudly. A pair of tap dancing hounds perform. The yokel laughs again, and other audience members knock him out with a mallet. Mickey and Minnie round out the performance with a duet for piano and horns, assisted by a mischievous litter of kittens.

== Voice cast ==
- Pluto: Lee Millar
- Dippy Dawg, Goats: Pinto Colvig

== Home media ==
The short was released on December 2, 2002, on Walt Disney Treasures: Mickey Mouse in Black and White.

== See also ==
- Mickey Mouse (film series)
