= Fender Bandmaster Reverb =

The Fender Bandmaster Reverb was a tube amplifier made by Fender. It was primarily a Silverface Bandmaster piggyback 'head' with the addition of reverb and vibrato and a modified circuit that shared more similarities with other Fender amplifiers. It was introduced in 1968 and was discontinued in 1980. The Bandmaster Reverb was produced in both a 40 watt and 70 watt tube variant, before being reissued as a vintage modified amplifier.

== History ==
The first version of the Fender Bandmaster Reverb was introduced in 1968 as a Silverface Bandmaster that offered reverb on the vibrato channel. Fender introduced the amplifier with a 5U4GB rectifier tube rather than the diode rectifier found in the previous Blackface Bandmaster. This resulted in the Bandmaster Reverb having reduced power over the standard model and increased sag and power amp break up. The revised circuit also places the gain stage within the reverb recovery circuit which causes the amp to break up earlier. These series amps offer the designations AA768, AA568, AA1069 and TFL5005.

A revised model was introduced in 1977 that increased power output to 70 watts. The output transformer was connected as ultra linear to the power tubes and larger filter caps were used. These changes increased the headroom of the amp and brought it more inline with the non-reverb versions. This was complemented by the added functionality of a master volume and a push/pull boost. Some later Bandmaster Reverbs also added a 3-band EQ on the Normal channel and a bright switch but this was uncommon across all models.

Master volume models with "pull boost" tone circuit, a Mid control knob for the Normal channel and a tailless amp decal were introduced in 1976. Power was increased from 40 to 70 watts/RMS; Line Out jack, hum balance pot and an ultra linear output transformer were added in 1977.

The amp was reissued in 2009 as the Band-Master VM (Vintage Modified series), and features many of the characteristics of the original. It is however largely a different amp as it models the blackface variants of the Bandmaster and adds reverb. On top of this it deviates from the traditional Bandmaster reverb formula in its use of a hybrid preamp section which utilises 12ax7 tube power alongside a DSP section.

== Circuit ==
There are several versions of the Bandmaster Reverb circuit:

Bandmaster Reverb Valve / Tube Compliments
Circuit Designation	Pre-amp valves	Power-amp valves	Rectifier
AA270	3x 7025, 2x 12AT7, 1x 12AX7	2x 6L6GC	5U4GB
AA768	3x 7025, 2x 12AT7, 1x 12AX7	2x 6L6GC	GZ34
AA1069	3x 7025, 2x 12AT7, 1x 12AX7	2x 6L6GC	5U4GB

The first two 7025 valves are used for the first stage pre-amps (one 'normal' channel and one 'vibrato'), the second 7025 being used for the reverb recovery and mixing stages. The single 12AT7 was used for the reverb driver while the 12AX7 was used for the vibrato circuit.

Note that the 'vibrato' circuit is actually a 'tremolo' effect in that it modulates amplitude not pitch of the signal.

== See also ==
- Bandmaster
