= Pinto Colvig =

American voice actor and animator (1892–1967)

- Colvig recording his voice for Goofy
- Born: Vance DeBar Colvig; September 11, 1892; Jacksonville, Oregon, U.S.
- Died: October 3, 1967 (aged 75); Los Angeles, California, U.S.
- Resting place: Holy Cross Cemetery, Ladera Heights, California, U.S.
- Occupations: Actor; cartoonist; circus performer
- Years active: 1913–1967
- Spouses: Margaret Bourke Slavin (m. 1916; died 1950) Peggy Bernice Allaire (m. 1952)
- Children: 5, including Vance DeBar Colvig Jr.

Vance DeBar Colvig Sr. (September 11, 1892 – October 3, 1967), known professionally as Pinto Colvig, was an American actor, animator, cartoonist, and circus and vaudeville performer. He was best known for being the original performer of the Disney characters Goofy and Pluto, as well as Bozo the Clown and Bluto in Popeye. In 1993, he was posthumously made a Disney Legend for his contributions to Walt Disney Films, including Snow White and the Seven Dwarfs and Fun and Fancy Free. His schtick was playing the clarinet off-key while mugging.

== Early life ==
Vance DeBar Colvig was born on September 11, 1892, in Jacksonville, Oregon. His father was William Mason "Judge" Colvig (1845–1936) and his mother was Adelaide (née Birdseye) Colvig (1856–1912). He was the youngest of their seven children.

William Colvig was a pioneer, an attorney and a distinguished Oregonian; he was never actually a judge. Pinto attended but did not graduate from Medford High School. Pinto was accepted and attended, sporadically from 1910 to 1913, Oregon State University, in Corvallis, where he took art classes and played clarinet in the band. He drew cartoons for the Oregon Agricultural College Barometer newspaper, and the yearbook.

I was born in Jacksonville and named Vance DeBar Colvig. At age 7 (because of too many freckles, and goony antics) I was nicknamed 'Pinto the Village Clown' (which I have used professionally during my circus and other show business activities, besides occasional jobs as a newspaper cartoonist.
— "'Pinto' Colvig Writes About Names, History of Clowning", Medford Mail Tribune, July 12, 1961.

== Career ==
In 1913, Colvig worked the Pantages Theatre Circuit, briefly, before leaving for clarinetist in the Al G. Barnes Circus band for part of a season. In 1914 he was a newspaper cartoonist in Reno, Nevada and then in Carson City, then again clarinetist in the Al G. Barnes Circus band for part of the 1915 season.

I didn't know when I was going to school whether I wanted to be a clown, draw cartoons, write, hobo, or be a musician. So I wrapped it all up and made stew out of it.
— Pinto Colvig

Colvig performed chalk talks in vaudeville.

In 1916, Colvig worked at the Animated Film Corporation in San Francisco where he made Creation, reported to be the world's first feature-length cartoon. Only five 35 mm frames survive, housed at the Southern Oregon Historical Society. Animated Film Corporation in San Francisco, ended with the entry of the U.S. into World War I (April 1917).

In 1919, Pinto produced "Pinto's Prizma Comedy Review," the first color cartoon. It is now considered a lost film. He also published in the San Francisco Bulletin (May 1919—February 1920) the "Bulletin Boob" column and photographs.

In 1922, Colvig created a newspaper cartoon panel titled "Life on the Radio Wave" for the San Francisco Chronicle. The feature ran three or four times per week on the newspaper's radio page, was syndicated nationally, and lasted six months. In 1922, Colvig and his family moved to Hollywood, working as an animator, title writer and comedian in silent comedies and on sound cartoons, working first for Mack Sennett.

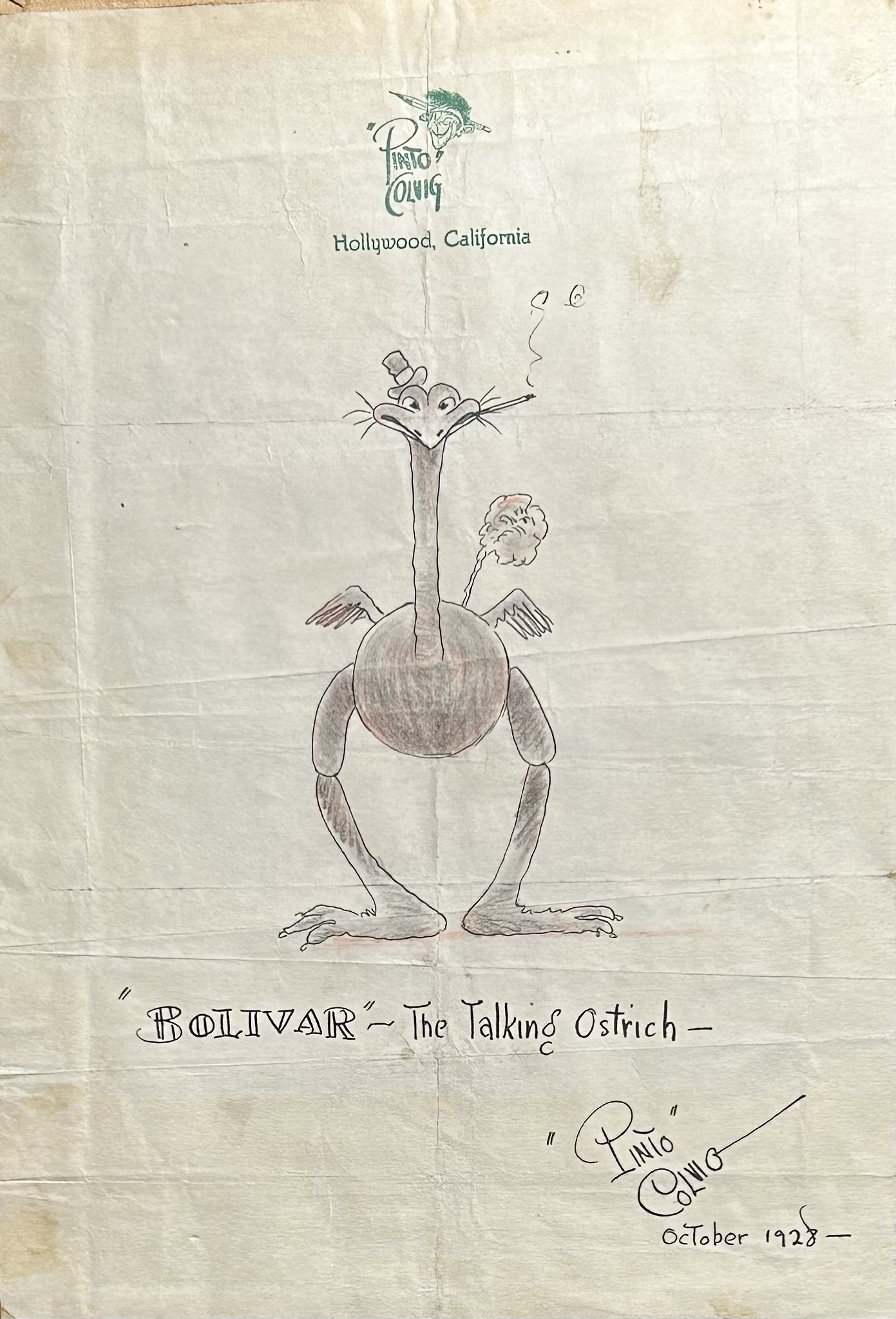
Bolivar The Talking Ostrich

By the late 1920s, Colvig became associated with Walter Lantz, with whom he attempted to establish a cartoon studio, creating a character called "Bolivar, the Talking Ostrich", which would have appeared in sound shorts. When Lantz became producer of Universal Pictures's Oswald the Lucky Rabbit cartoons in 1929, Colvig was hired as an animator, also working as a storyman and voice artist, briefly voicing Oswald.

In 1930, Colvig signed an eight-year contract with Walt Disney Productions as a writer. He also provided sound effects, including the barks for Pluto the Pup. The following year he began voicing Goofy, originally known as Dippy Dawg. Other notable characters he voiced include Practical Pig, the pig that built the "house of bricks" in the Disney short "Three Little Pigs", and both Grumpy and Sleepy in Snow White and the Seven Dwarfs. He directed (along with Erdman Penner and Walt Pfeiffer) the 1937 Mickey Mouse short Mickey's Amateurs. Colvig was associated with Disney for most of his career.

After a falling out with Walt Disney, Colvig did not work for the Disney studio between 1939 and 1943. He was offered a job with Fleischer Studios, then planning to produce a competing feature-length animated film in the wake of Disney's success with Snow White and the Seven Dwarfs. He moved to Miami, then Fleischer's location, in early 1938.

For Fleischer, Colvig worked on 1939's Gulliver's Travels, for which he voiced town crier Gabby, who was spun off into his own short-lived series. He also voiced Bluto for the studio's Popeye the Sailor cartoons, replacing Gus Wickie, who elected to remain in New York rather than move to Miami when the studio relocated. Colvig's departure from Disney meant that the increasingly popular Goofy went voiceless for several years. A select few shorts during the interim period of leave featured a soundalike voice for Goofy provided by Jack Bailey.

Colvig began working in radio, providing voices and sound effects, including the sounds of Jack Benny's Maxwell car for The Jack Benny Program, later performed by Mel Blanc.

In 1939, Colvig returned to California, and began to devote himself to acting and doing voices in several cartoons for Leon Schlesinger Productions and for MGM, where he voiced a Munchkin in the 1939 film The Wizard of Oz.

In 1946, Colvig was cast as Bozo the Clown for Capitol Records. He played the role for a decade, which also included portraying the character on television. During this period, Colvig also recorded the "Filbert the Frog" song, which featured Colvig's virtuoso use of the glottal stop as a musical instrument in itself.

In 1967, Colvig's last known performance, as Goofy, was for the Telephone Pavilion at Expo 67. Colvig's dialogue for this exhibit was recorded six months before his death.

== Personal life ==
Colvig married Margaret Bourke Slavin (1892–1950) in 1916, and settled with her in San Francisco, where four of their five boys were born. Later, their last son was born in Los Angeles. After Margaret died in 1950, Colvig married his second wife Peggy Bernice Allaire in January 1952, they remained married until Colvig's death in 1967.

Colvig was the father of the character and voice actor Vance Colvig, who also later portrayed Bozo the Clown on a live TV program.

A lifelong smoker, Colvig was one of the pioneers in advocating warning labels about cancer risk on cigarette packages in the United States.

== Death ==
Colvig died of lung cancer on October 3, 1967, at Motion Picture Country Hospital in Woodland Hills, Los Angeles, California, at age 75. He was buried at Holy Cross Cemetery in Culver City. His grave remained unmarked for years until Colvig's descendants, his great-granddaughter and Arthur Dark, designed his marker and placed his headstone respectively in 2020.

== Filmography ==
Year	Title	Role	Notes
1916	Creation	Animator	Director, writer, producer
1919	Pinto's Prizma Comedy Revue		Director, writer, producer
1925	Hey Fever Time		Uncredited voice
1925	After a Reputation		Uncredited voice
1925	Buster be Good		Uncredited voice
1925	Oh! Buster!	The Butler	Uncredited voice
1925	Buster's Nightmare		Uncredited voice
1926	A Prodigal Bridegroom		Animator
1928	The Cockeyed Family	Orange farmer	Uncredited voice
1928	All Alike		Writer
1928	Standing Pat		Writer
1928	Blue Notes	Bolivar	Director, writer, voice
1930	Hells Heels	Singing skull, walrus	Uncredited voice
1930	My Pal Paul	Oswald the Lucky Rabbit (one line)	Animator and uncredited voice
1930	Not So Quiet		Writer and uncredited animator
1930	Spooks	Hippo	Writer, animator and uncredited voice
1930	Henpecked	Oswald the Lucky Rabbit, Pete	Writer, animator and uncredited voice
1930	Cold Feet		Writer and animator
1930	Snappy Salesman		Writer and animator
1930	The Singing Sap	Hippo, Hiccups	Animator
1930	The Detective		Animator
1930	The Fowl Ball	Oswald the Lucky Rabbit	Animator
1930	The Navy		Animator
1930	Mexico	Pete (laughing)	Animator
1930	Africa	Oswald the Lucky Rabbit	Animator and uncredited voice
1930	Alaska	Oswald the Lucky Rabbit, Pete, deadpan singer, walrus	Animator and uncredited voice
1930	Mars	Pete, Martian creature	Animator
1931	College		Uncredited animator
1931	Shipwreck		Animator
1931	China		Uncredited animator
1931	The Farmer	Dance caller	Animator
1931	The Fireman		Animator
1931	Sunny South		Animator
1931	Country School		Animator
1931	The Bandmaster	Baby hippo (some laughs)	Animator
1931	The Stone Age		Animator
1931	Radio Rhythm	Horse, radio tube	Animator
1931	The Hunter	Dog, fox	Animator
1931	Kentucky Belles		Writer
1932	Barnyard Olympics	Laughing in audience	Uncredited voice
1932	Mickey's Revue	Dippy Dog, goats	Uncredited voice
1932	Trader Mickey	Pluto, hippo, chief, native	Uncredited voice
1932	The Whoopee Party	Goofy, Horace Horsecollar	Uncredited voice
1932	Touchdown Mickey	Goofy	Uncredited voice
1932	The Wayward Canary	Pluto	Uncredited voice
1932	The Klondike Kid	Goofy	Uncredited voice
1932	Santa's Workshop	Santa's secretary	Uncredited voice
1932	Mickey's Good Deed	Pluto	Uncredited voice
1933	Building a Building	Whistler	Uncredited voice
1933	The Mad Doctor	Pluto	Uncredited voice
1933	Mickey's Pal Pluto	Pluto's angel	Uncredited voice
1933	Mickey's Mellerdrammer	Goofy, dogs	Uncredited voice
1933	Ye Olden Days	Goofy	Uncredited voice
1933	Three Little Pigs	Practical Pig, Big Bad Wolf (sheep voice)	Writer and voice
1933	The Steeple Chase	Colonel Rolf Rolfe, stable boy #1, stable boy #2	Uncredited voice
1934	The China Shop	Hiccups	Uncredited voice
1934	The Grasshopper and the Ants	Hop the Grasshopper	Uncredited voice
1934	The Big Bad Wolf	Practical Pig	Voice
1934	Orphan's Benefit	Goofy	Uncredited voice
1934	Servants' Entrance	Mustard pot	Uncredited voice
1934	Mickey Plays Papa	Pluto	Uncredited voice
1934	The Dog Napper	Dogs	Uncredited voice
1935	The Tortoise and the Hare	Starter	Uncredited voice
1935	Mickey's Man Friday	Mickey Mouse (mask screams)	Uncredited voice
1935	Mickey's Service Station	Goofy	Uncredited voice
1935	Mickey's Kangaroo	Pluto (some whines)	Uncredited voice
1935	The Cookie Carnival	Gingerbread man	Writer and uncredited voice
1935	Mickey's Garden	Pluto	Uncredited voice
1935	Mickey's Fire Brigade	Goofy	Uncredited voice
1935	Music Land		Writer, Uncredited
1935	Pluto's Judgement Day	Second victim	Uncredited voice
1935	On Ice	Goofy, Pluto	Uncredited voice
1935	Cock O' the Walk	Rooster call	Uncredited voice
1935	Broken Toys		Uncredited writer
1936	Mickey's Polo Team	Goofy	Uncredited voice
1936	Elmer Elephant	Joe Giraffe, whistler	Uncredited voice
1936	Three Little Wolves	Practical Pig	Voice
1936	Thru the Mirror	Radio, nutcracker sounds	Voice
1936	Moving Day	Goofy	Uncredited voice
1936	Alpine Climbers	Pluto	Uncredited voice
1936	Three Blind Mouseketeers	Tall thin Mouseketeer	Uncredited voice
1937	The Worm Turns	Lab noises	Uncredited voice
1937	Magician Mickey	Goofy	Uncredited voice
1937	Moose Hunters	Goofy	Uncredited voice
1937	Mickey's Amateurs	Goofy, Pegleg Pete	Writer, director and uncredited voice
1937	Hawaiian Holiday	Goofy, Pluto	Uncredited voice
1937	Clock Cleaners	Goofy	Uncredited voice
1937	Pluto's Quin-puplets	Pluto, Fifi	Uncredited voice
1937	Snow White and the Seven Dwarfs	Grumpy, Sleepy, Dopey (various noises)	Uncredited voice
1937	Lonesome Ghosts	Goofy	Uncredited voice
1938	Boat Builders	Goofy	Uncredited voice
1938	Blue Monday	Vocal effects	Uncredited voice
1938	Poultry Pirates	Rooster	Uncredited voice
1938	The Captain's Pup	Dog	Uncredited voice
1938	Mickey's Trailer	Goofy	Uncredited voice
1938	Polar Trappers	Goofy	Uncredited voice
1938	Poor Little Butterfly	Grasshopper	Uncredited voice
1938	Poor Elmer	Monkey	Uncredited voice
1938	The Frog Pond	Frogs	Uncredited voice
1938	The Pygmy Hunt	Laughing hyena	Uncredited voice
1938	The Whalers	Goofy	Uncredited voice
1938	Old Smokey	Smokey, fire engine	Uncredited voice
1938	The Honduras Hurricane	Rooster, vocal effects	Uncredited voice
1938	Merbabies	Octopus	Writer
1939	Mickey's Surprise Party	Fifi	Uncredited voice
1939	The Lone Stranger and Porky	Villain's horse	Uncredited voice
1939	Soup to Mutts	Dogs	Uncredited voice
1939	Dog Gone Modern	Two Curious Puppies	Uncredited voice
1939	The House That Jack Built	Jack the Beaver, Joe Ostrich	Uncredited voice
1939	Porky and Teabiscuit	Teabiscuit, horses, Grandpa	Voice
1939	Musical Mountaineers	Hillbillies	Uncredited voice
1939	Wotta Nitemare	Bluto	Uncredited voice
1939	Hobo Gadget Band	Lead hobo, hobo with soda fizz	Uncredited voice
1939	The Pointer	Pluto	Uncredited voice, archive sound
1939	Snowman's Land	Little Mountie	Uncredited voice
1939	It's the Natural Thing to Do	Bluto	Uncredited voice
1939	The Wizard of Oz	Munchkins	Uncredited voice
1939	Gulliver's Travels	Gabby, Snitch, Gulliver (water gurgling sounds)	Uncredited voice
1940	Shakespearian Spinach	Bluto	Uncredited voice
1940	Females Is Fickle	Jellyfish	Uncredited voice
1940	Me Feelins Is Hurt	Bluto	Uncredited voice
1940	Onion Pacific	Bluto	Uncredited voice
1940	Nurse-Mates	Bluto	Uncredited voice
1940	A Case of Spring Fever	Coily	Uncredited voice
1940	Wedding Belts	Henry Jive	Uncredited voice
1940	Fightin Pals	Bluto	Uncredited voice
1940	Snubbed by a Snob	Bull	Uncredited voice
1940	Way Back When Women Had Their Weigh	Buff Caveman	Uncredited voice
1940	You Can't Shoe a Horse Fly	Horsefly	Uncredited voice
1940	Popeye Meets William Tell	High Governor	Uncredited voice
1940	King for a Day	Gabby	Uncredited voice
1940	The Constable	Gabby	Uncredited voice
1940	Poopdeck Pappy	Bruiser	Uncredited voice
1940	Popeye Presents Eugene, the Jeep	Delivery man	Uncredited voice
1940	Bring Himself Back Alive	Lion	Uncredited voice
1941	All's Well	Gabby	Uncredited voice
1941	Two for the Zoo	Gabby	Writer and uncredited voice
1941	Swing Cleaning	Gabby	Uncredited voice
1941	Raggedy Ann and Raggedy Andy	Camel	Uncredited voice
1941	Canine Caddy	Pluto	Uncredited voice
1941	Fire Cheese	Gabby	Uncredited voice
1941	Gabby Goes Fishing	Gabby	Uncredited voice
1941	It's a Hap-Hap-Happy Day	Gabby	Uncredited voice
1941	Lend a Paw	Pluto	Uncredited voice
1941	Man's Best Friend	Hunter, Snoozer	Uncredited voice
1941	The Flying Bear	Barney Bear	Uncredited voice
1941	The Thrifty Pig	Practical Pig	Uncredited voice
1941	Mr. Bug Goes to Town	Mr. Creeper	Uncredited voice
1941	7 Wise Dwarfs	Doc	Uncredited voice
1941	The Tangled Angler	Pete Pelican	Uncredited voice
1942	The Raven	The Wolf, Scotty	Writer and uncredited voice
1942	Aloha Hooey	Cecil Crow	Uncredited voice
1942	Mickey's Birthday Party	Goofy	Uncredited voice
1942	Pluto Junior	Pluto	Uncredited voice
1942	Conrad the Sailor	Conrad the Cat	Uncredited voice
1942	Symphony Hour	Goofy	Uncredited voice
1942	The Army Mascot	Pluto	Uncredited voice
1942	The Sleep Walker	Pluto	Uncredited voice
1942	Bats in the Belfry	Bats	Uncredited voice
1942	Out of the Frying Pan Into the Firing Line	Pluto	Uncredited voice
1942	T-Bone for Two	Pluto	Uncredited voice
1942	Blitz Wolf	Sergeant Pork, the third pig	Uncredited voice
1942	Saludos Amigos	Goofy	Uncredited voice
1942	Pluto at the Zoo	Pluto	Uncredited voice
1942	Ding Dog Daddy	Goofy Dog	Uncredited voice
1943	Pluto and the Armadillo	Pluto	Uncredited voice
1943	Hop and Go	Claude Hopper	Uncredited voice
1943	Private Pluto	Pluto	Uncredited voice
1943	Red Hot Riding Hood	Wolf (howling)	Uncredited voice
1943	Victory Vehicles	Goofy	Uncredited voice
1943	One Ham's Family	Father Pig	Uncredited voice
1943	Pass the Biscuits Mirandy!	Foy and Barton Boys	Uncredited voice
1943	The Stork's Holiday	Stork	Uncredited voice
1944	The Three Caballeros	Aracuan	Uncredited voice
1944	How to Be a Sailor	Goofy	Uncredited voice
1944	Innertube Antics	Ol' Doc Donkey	Uncredited voice
1944	How to Play Golf	Goofy	Uncredited voice
1944	Batty Baseball	Pitcher	Uncredited voice
1944	The Tree Surgeon	Ol' Doc Donkey	Uncredited voice
1944	Springtime for Pluto	Pluto	Uncredited voice
1944	How to Play Football	Goofy	Uncredited voice
1944	First Aiders	Pluto	Uncredited voice
1945	Tiger Trouble	Goofy	Uncredited voice
1945	The Screwy Truant	Meathead, Screwy Squirrel laughing	Uncredited voice
1945	Dog Watch	Pluto	Uncredited voice
1945	The Eyes Have It	Pluto	Uncredited voice
1945	African Diary	Goofy	Uncredited voice
1945	Californy er Bust	Goofy	Uncredited voice
1945	Canine Casanova	Pluto	Uncredited voice
1945	The Legend of Coyote Rock	Pluto	Uncredited voice
1945	No Sail	Goofy	Uncredited voice
1945	Hockey Homicide	Goofy	Uncredited voice
1945	Canine Patrol	Pluto	Uncredited voice
1946	A Knight for a Day	Goofy	Uncredited voice
1946	Pluto's Kid Brother	Pluto	Uncredited voice
1946	Make Mine Music	Vocal effects	Uncredited voice
1946	In Dutch	Pluto	Uncredited voice
1946	Squatter's Rights	Pluto	Uncredited voice
1946	The Purloined Pup	Pluto	Uncredited voice
1946	A Feather in His Collar	Pluto	Uncredited voice
1946	Frank Duck Brings 'em Back Alive	Goofy	Uncredited voice
1946	Double Dribble	Goofy	Uncredited voice
1947	Variety Girl	Special voice impersonation	Uncredited voice
1947	Pluto's Housewarming	Pluto	Uncredited voice
1947	Rescue Dog	Pluto	Uncredited voice
1947	Clown of the Jungle	Aracuan Bird	Uncredited voice
1947	Crazy with the Heat	Goofy	Uncredited voice
1947	Fun and Fancy Free	Goofy, Bongo the Bear	Uncredited voice
1947	Mickey's Delayed Date	Pluto	Uncredited voice
1947	Foul Hunting	Goofy	Uncredited voice
1947	Mail Dog	Pluto	Uncredited voice
1947	King-Size Canary	Cat	Uncredited voice
1947	Pluto's Blue Note	Pluto	Uncredited voice
1948	Bill and Coo	Singer	Uncredited voice
1948	Melody Time (segment: 'Blame it on the Samba')	Aracuan Bird	Uncredited voice
1948	They're Off	Goofy	Uncredited voice
1948	The Big Wash	Goofy	Uncredited voice
1948	Mickey Down Under	Pluto	Uncredited voice
1948	Bone Bandit	Pluto	Uncredited voice
1948	Pluto's Purchase	Pluto	Uncredited voice
1948	Cat Nap Pluto	Pluto	Uncredited voice
1948	Pluto's Fledgling	Pluto	Uncredited voice
1948	The Cat That Hated People	Lips	Uncredited voice
1948	Mickey and the Seal	Pluto	Uncredited voice
1948	Tea for Two Hundred	Ants	Uncredited voice
1948	Wild and Woody!	Sheriff, Wild Bill Hiccup, Devil	Uncredited voice
1949	Pueblo Pluto	Pluto	Uncredited voice
1949	Pluto's Surprise Package	Pluto	Uncredited voice
1949	Pluto's Sweater	Pluto	Uncredited voice
1949	Bubble Bee	Pluto	Uncredited voice
1949	Tennis Racquet	Goofy	Uncredited voice
1949	Little Rural Riding Hood	Country Wolf	Uncredited voice
1949	Goofy Gymnastics	Goofy	Uncredited voice
1949	The Adventures of Ichabod and Mr. Toad	Ichabod Crane (screaming), Daredevil	Uncredited voice
1949	Sheep Dog	Pluto	Uncredited voice
1950	Pluto's Heart Throb	Pluto	Uncredited voice
1950	Pluto and the Gopher	Pluto	Uncredited voice
1950	How to Ride a Horse	Goofy	Uncredited voice
1950	Wonder Dog	Pluto	Uncredited voice
1950	How to Ride a Horse	Goofy	Uncredited voice
1950	Primitive Pluto	Pluto	Uncredited voice
1950	Puss Cafe	Pluto	Uncredited voice
1950	Pests of the West	Pluto	Uncredited voice
1950	Food for Feudin	Pluto	Uncredited voice
1950	Camp Dog	Pluto	Uncredited voice
1950	Hold That Pose	Goofy	Uncredited voice
1951	Alice in Wonderland	Flamingo	Uncredited voice
1951	Hello Aloha	Goofy	Uncredited voice
1951	Man's Best Friend	Goofy	Uncredited voice
1951	Two Gun Goofy	Goofy	Uncredited voice
1951	Teachers Are People	Goofy	Uncredited voice
1951	Pluto's Party	Pluto	Uncredited voice
1951	No Smoking	Goofy	Uncredited voice
1951	Cold Turkey	Pluto	Uncredited voice
1951	Get Rich Quick	Goofy	Uncredited voice
1951	R'coon Dawg	Pluto	Uncredited voice
1951	Lion Down	Goofy	Uncredited voice
1951	Cold Storage	Pluto	Uncredited voice
1951	Plutopia	Pluto	Uncredited voice
1952	Fresh Laid Plans	Farmer	Uncredited voice
1952	Pluto's Christmas Tree	Pluto, Goofy	Uncredited voice
1952	How to Be a Detective	Goofy	Uncredited voice
1952	Uncle Donald's Ants	Ants	Uncredited voice
1952	Father's Day Off	Goofy	Uncredited voice
1952	Two Weeks Vacation	Goofy	Uncredited voice
1952	Tomorrow We Diet!	Goofy	Uncredited voice
1952	Cold War	Goofy	Uncredited voice
1952	Home Made Home	Pluto, Goofy	Uncredited voice
1952	Little Runaway	Baby seal, Tom Cat (seal noises)	Uncredited voice
1953	Father's Day Off	Goofy	Uncredited voice
1953	The Simple Things	Pluto	Uncredited voice
1953	For Whom the Bulls Toil	Goofy	Uncredited voice
1953	Father's Week-end	Goofy	Uncredited voice
1953	How to Dance	Goofy	Uncredited voice
1953	How to Sleep	Goofy	Uncredited voice
1954	Spare the Rod	Pygmy cannibals	Uncredited voice
1954	The Flying Squirrel	The Flying Squirrel (giant peanut barking sounds)	Uncredited voice
1959	Sleeping Beauty	Maleficent's goon	Uncredited voice
1961	Aquamania	Goofy	Uncredited voice
1965	Freewayphobia	Goofy	Uncredited voice
1965	Goofy's Freeway Troubles	Goofy	Uncredited voice
1965	Donald Duck Goes West	Goofy	Voice (final film role)

== Discography ==
- Bozo At The Circus (Capitol, 1946) as Bozo the Clown
- Mickey and the Beanstalk (Capitol, 1947) as Goofy
- Here Comes...Colonna's Trolley (Capitol, 1947) as Voice Characterizations
- Bozo and his Rocket Ship (Capitol, 1948) as Bozo the Clown
- Bozo Under The Sea (Capitol, 1948) as Bozo the Clown
- Bozo and the Birds (Capitol, 1949) as Bozo the Clown
- The Grasshopper And The Ants (Capitol, 1949) as The Grasshopper
- Bozo on The Farm (Capitol, 1950) as Bozo the Clown
- Bozo Has A Party (Capitol, 1952) as Bozo the Clown
- Mickey Mouse's Candy Mine (RCA Victor, 1952) as Goofy
- Bozo At The Dog Show (Capitol, 1954) as Bozo the Clown
- Bozo's Merry-Go-Round Music (Capitol, 1954) as Bozo the ClownI
- Mickey Mouse's Birthday Party (Capitol, 1954) as Goofy, Pluto, Grumpy, Practical Pig, Cleo
- Walt Disney's Song Parade from Disneyland (Golden, 1956) as Goofy
- Mickey and the Beanstalk (Disneyland, 1963) as Goofy
- Goofy's TV Spectacular (Disneyland, 1964) as Goofy
- Children's Riddles and Game Songs (Disneyland, 1964) as Goofy (speaking voice only)

Preceded by none	Voice of Goofy; 1932–1967	Succeeded by Hal Smith
Preceded by none	Voice of Pluto; 1932–1937	Succeeded by Jimmy MacDonald
