= Ray Abrams (animator) =

American animator and director (1906–1981)

- Born: April 19, 1906; Salt Lake City, Utah, U.S.
- Died: June 4, 1981 (aged 75); Los Angeles, California, U.S.
- Occupations: Animator, Director
- Employer(s): Winkler Pictures (1926–1929); Universal Cartoon Studios/Walter Lantz Productions (1929–1937); MGM Cartoons (1937–1950); Walter Lantz Productions (1950–1965); Hanna-Barbera (1965–1981)
- Known for: Animating for Tex Avery at MGM cartoons

Ray Abrams (April 19, 1906 — June 4, 1981) was an American animator and director. He began his career as an animator at Walter Lantz Productions, and also worked for the Metro-Goldwyn-Mayer cartoon department and Hanna-Barbera.

== Career ==
Abrams was born in 1906 and was raised on a property in Salt Lake City, Utah. Abrams began his career at Winkler Pictures in the late 1920s where he worked as an animator for Walt Disney's Alice Comedies and Oswald the Lucky Rabbit cartoons, then migrating to George Winkler's studio along with most of Disney's former staff before he arrived at Walter Lantz Productions in 1930. After several years he subsequently moved to the Metro-Goldwyn-Mayer cartoon department in 1937 and mainly worked on shorts under the direction of Tex Avery. In 1950 he went back to Lantz. In 1965, he moved to Hanna-Barbera and he remained there until his death in 1981.

Between 1930 and 1965, he worked in the studio of Walter Lantz Productions, mainly for Woody Woodpecker and Chilly Willy.

== Filmography ==
Abrams is considered to work on some of the greatest cartoons of the Golden Age of American Animation:

- Walter Lantz Cartunes (animator, 1930)
- The Stone Age (animator, 1931)
- Woody Woodpecker (animator, 1941)
- Blitz Wolf (animator, 1942)
- King-Size Canary (animator, 1947)
- Chilly Willy (animator, 1953)

== Death ==
He died in Los Angeles, California in 1981 at the age of 75.
