= Bill Nolan (animator) =

American cartoonist and animator (1894–1954)

- Born: William Charles Nolan; June 10, 1894; Connecticut, U.S.
- Died: December 6, 1954 (aged 60); Madison, Wisconsin, U.S.
- Occupations: Animator, director, cartoon writer, artist
- Years active: 1913–1954
- Spouse: Viola Golden
- Children: 2

William Charles Nolan (June 10, 1894 – December 6, 1954) was an American animated cartoon writer, animator, director, and artist. He is best known for creating and perfecting the rubber hose style of animation and for streamlining Felix the Cat.

== Early life and education ==
Nolan attended La Salle Academy and Classical High School in Providence, Rhode Island.

== Career ==
Nolan first began his career in 1913 as a newspaper cartoonist, then worked for Raoul Barre and King Features Syndicate until 1918.

He joined the United States Navy in June 1917 at the Navy Recruiting Station at Fort Lafayette, New York. He served at Headquarters, 3rd Naval District in New York and the Brooklyn Naval Hospital, New York. He was discharged in June 1921 as a Chief Yeoman.

From 1924 to 1926, he animated and designed Felix the Cat at Pat Sullivan's studio. He then sought a license from King Features to produce new Krazy Kat cartoons, finding a distributor in Margaret J. Winkler. Nolan directed the series for Winkler Pictures until 1925 to 1927, when a new team led by Ben Harrison and Manny Gould took over. Nolan formed an alliance with Winkler employee Walter Lantz, moving with him and a majority of Winkler's staff to Universal Pictures' animation studio from 1929 until 1935, where he served as director and producer, even briefly voicing Oswald the Lucky Rabbit. Nolan would later leave Lantz to start out Mayfair Productions to produce Skippy cartoons, but only one "The Dog Catcher" was released for United Artists.

Nolan also worked at MGM on The Captain and the Kids series based on the comic strip The Katzenjammer Kids. He then worked with Fleischer Studios where he worked on Popeye and Gulliver's Travels. During World War II, Nolan was in the Navy drawing technical manuals with Timm Aircraft. In 1949, after the war, he formed Willam-Nicholas Productions with Nick Nicholas. He moved his company in 1954 in Madison, Wisconsin, where he died in December.
