= Oswald the Lucky Rabbit =

Cartoon character

- Oswald the Lucky Rabbit/Mickey Mouse & Friends/Woody Woodpecker character
- Oswald, as he appears in an ad for The Film Daily, colorized
- First appearance: Trolley Troubles (1927)
- Created by: Walt Disney; Ub Iwerks
- Designed by: Walt Disney & Ub Iwerks (original design); Manuel Moreno (1930s redesign)
- Voiced by: Bill Nolan (1929); Pinto Colvig (1930); Mickey Rooney (1930–1931); Shirley Reed (1931, 1934); Tex Avery (1932–1935); The Rhythmettes (1934–1935); Margaret McKay (1938); Bernice Hansen (1938); June Foray (1943, 1947); Dick Beals (1952); Mel Blanc (1957); Gloria Wood (1957); Frank Welker (2009–2018); David Errigo Jr. (2023–present)
- Developed by: Walter Lantz; Bill Nolan; Tex Avery; Manuel Moreno

In-universe information
- Species: Rabbit
- Gender: Male
- Significant others: Sadie/Fanny/Kitty/Ortensia the Cat (girlfriend; wife in some depictions); Francine Fanny Cottontail (first girlfriend; then rejected)
- Children: The Bunny Children; Floyd and Lloyd (adopted sons, comics only)
- Nationality: American

Oswald the Lucky Rabbit, also known as Oswald the Rabbit, Oswald Rabbit, and Ozzie, is an animated cartoon character created in 1927 by Walt Disney and Ub Iwerks for Universal Pictures. He starred in the titular series of short films released to theaters from 1927 to 1938. Twenty-seven animated Oswald shorts were animated at the Walt Disney Studio and produced by Winkler Pictures, while the rest were produced by Walter Lantz Productions. After Universal took control of Oswald's character in 1928, Disney created Mickey Mouse as a replacement to Oswald, surpassing Lantz's Oswald in popularity as the series was eventually made redundant in favor of other Universal series. The films established both Walt Disney and Walter Lantz as major players in the American animation industry in the golden age of American animation.

In 2003, Buena Vista Games pitched a concept for an Oswald-themed video game to then-Disney President and future-CEO Bob Iger, who became committed to acquiring the rights to Oswald. In 2006, The Walt Disney Company acquired the trademark of Oswald and the rights to the Disney-era films (with NBCUniversal effectively trading Oswald for the services of Al Michaels as play-by-play announcer on NBC Sunday Night Football).

After his fade into obscurity, Oswald has since had a modern resurgence in popularity, and is considered a cult character, particularly in the Disney theme parks. Oswald returned in Disney's 2010 video game, Epic Mickey. The game's metafiction plot parallels Oswald's real-world history, dealing with the character's feelings of abandonment by Disney and envy toward Mickey Mouse. He has since appeared in Disney theme parks, comic books, and video games. Oswald made his first appearance in an animated production in 85 years through his cameo appearance in the 2013 animated short Get a Horse!. Oswald films produced before 1931, including the original twenty-seven Disney-era produced films (those that survived.), are in the public domain.

== Characteristics ==
Cinema leaflet for children from c. 1928

While under Disney's creative control, Oswald was one of the first cartoon characters that had personality. As outlined by Walt himself: "Hereafter we will aim to [make] Oswald a younger character, peppy, alert, saucy, and venturesome, keeping him also neat and trim". With Oswald, Disney began to explore the concept of "personality animation", in which cartoon characters were defined as individuals through their movements, mannerisms, and acting, instead of simply through their design. Around this period, Disney had expressed: "I want the characters to be somebody. I don't want them just to be a drawing". Not only were gags used, but his humor differed in terms of what he used to make people laugh. He presented physical humor, used situations to his advantage and presented situational humor in general and frustration comedy best shown in the cartoon The Mechanical Cow. He would use animal limbs to solve problems and even use his own limbs as props and gags. He could be squished as if he was made of rubber and could turn anything into a tool. His distinct personality was inspired by Douglas Fairbanks for his courageous and adventurous attitude as seen in the cartoon short Oh, What a Knight.

In regard to Oswald's personality, Disney historian David Gerstein describes the difference between Mickey and Oswald: "Imagine Mickey if he were a little more egotistical or fallible, or imagine Bugs Bunny if he talked the talk but wasn't as good at walking the walk".

In order to make his Oswald cartoons look "real", Disney turned away from the styles of Felix the Cat, Koko the Clown, Winkler's own abridged version of Krazy Kat, and his own creation Julius the Cat; he began emulating the camera angles, effects, and editing of live-action films. To learn how to base gags on personality and how to build comic routines, rather than heaping one gag after another, he studied Laurel and Hardy, Harold Lloyd, Charlie Chaplin, and Buster Keaton. In order to stir emotion in an audience, Disney studied and scrutinized the shadow effects, cross-cutting, and staging of action in films featuring Douglas Fairbanks and Lon Chaney.

Over several cartoons, Disney and his animators would develop Oswald's persona: an "emotive, fast-moving wise guy, alternately ebullient and grouchy".

Walt Disney did not want for Oswald to simply be "a rabbit character animated and shown in the same light as the commonly known cat characters", as well as merely just a peg for gags. Instead, his stated intention was "to make Oswald peculiarly and typically OSWALD".

== History ==
=== Creation ===
In 1927, because of cost and technical restrictions, Disney and his chief animator Ub Iwerks ended their work on the Alice Comedies series, which remained with Film Booking Offices of America as Winkler cut ties with the company. Around the same time, Charles Mintz got word that Universal Pictures wanted to get into the cartoon business, so he told Disney to create a new rabbit character that he could sell to Universal, because there were too many cat characters that were affiliated with Winkler at the time. After Oswald was created, Winkler signed a contract with Universal on March 4 the same year, which would guarantee 26 Oswald the Lucky Rabbit cartoons. Work on both the character and series began soon after Disney moved his studio to Hyperion Avenue. As with the Alice Comedies series, Disney operated the studio while Winkler produced the films.

Oswald's first appearance in Trolley Troubles (1927)

Universal executives rejected the first Oswald cartoon, Poor Papa, for its poor production quality and the sloppiness and age of Oswald. Disney, together with Iwerks, created a second cartoon titled Trolley Troubles featuring a much younger, neater Oswald. The short, released on September 5, 1927, officially launched the series and proved to be Universal's greatest success to date. Poor Papa was later released in 1928 and the storyline was reused in a Mickey Mouse short five years later, in Mickey's Nightmare. Oswald the Lucky Rabbit became Universal's first major hit in 1927, rivaling other popular cartoon characters, such as former Winkler series Felix the Cat and Koko the Clown.

The success of the Oswald series allowed Disney's studio to grow to a staff of nearly twenty. Walt's weekly salary from the series was $100 while Roy Disney's was $65. The Disney brothers earned $500 per Oswald short and split the year-end profits, with Walt receiving 60% ($5,361), and Roy receiving 40% ($3,574). With income gained from the Oswald series, Walt and Roy purchased ten acres of land in the desert. They also invested in an oil-drilling venture. Iwerks also invested his income in several stone mills to crush paint pigment he used to make paint formulas that were utilized by animators for decades.

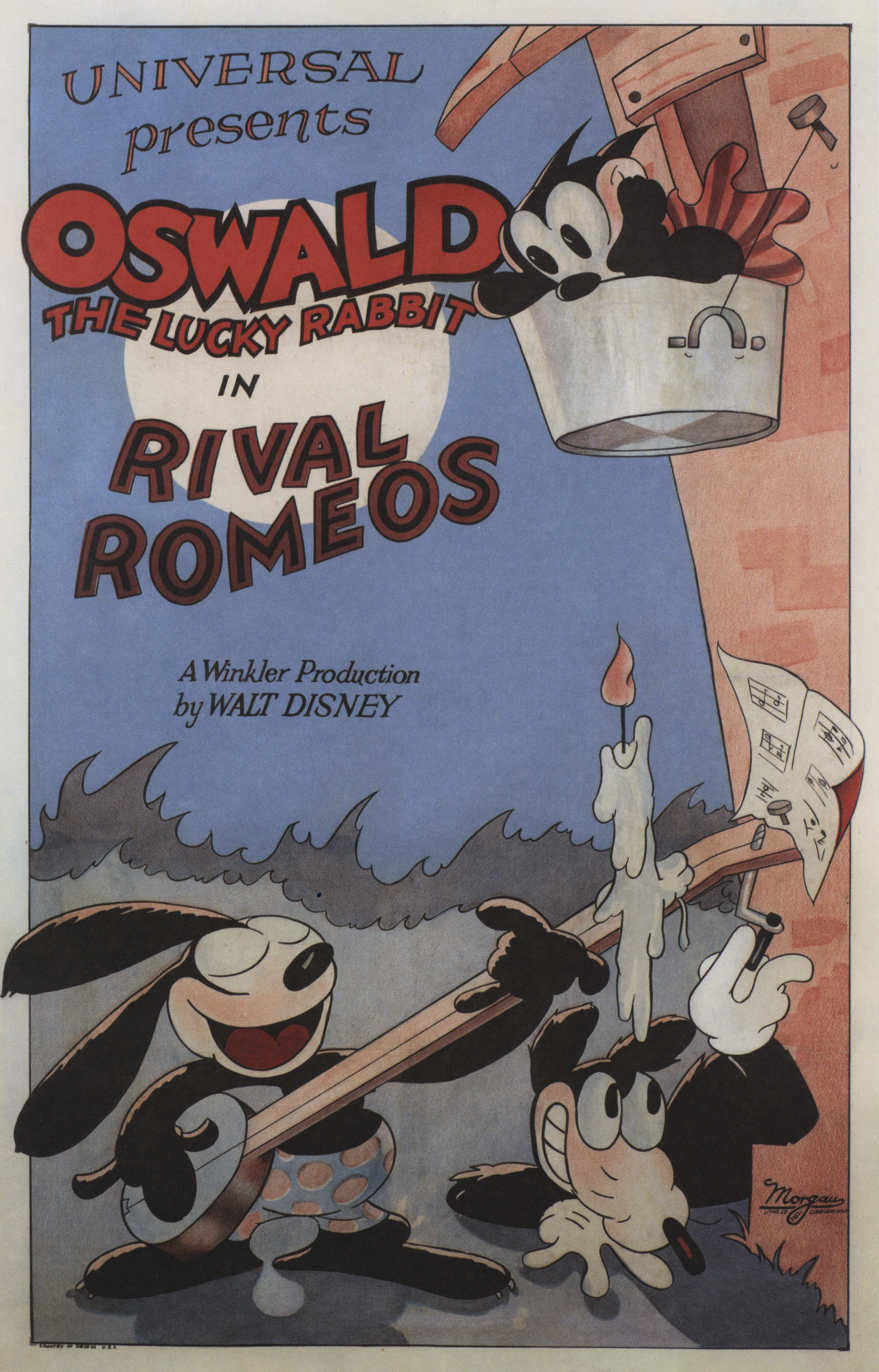
A 1928 poster of short film Rival Romeos

Oswald's success also resulted in Universal and Winkler signing another contract in February 1928, guaranteeing three more years of Oswald cartoons.

As time passed, Disney feared that Mintz would forgo renewal of the contract, partly due to Iwerks informing Disney that George Winkler, at the behest of Mintz, had been going behind Disney's back during pick-up runs for Oswald reels and hiring away his animators. Eventually, Disney traveled with his wife Lilly to New York to find other potential distributors for his studio's cartoons, including Fox and MGM, prior to meetings with Mintz. As Walt later recalled, he placed two Oswald prints under one arm and—feeling "like a hick"—marched "one half-block north" on Broadway to MGM to visit Fred Quimby. During this period, Walt and Lillian attended the premier of the Oswald short Rival Romeos, which debuted at the Colony on 53rd and Broadway.

In February 1928, Disney traveled to New York City in hopes of negotiating a more profitable contract with his producer Charles Mintz. As economic problems were apparent at the time, Mintz figured Disney should settle for a 20% cut, although large turnarounds were promised if the studio's finances showed considerable growth. While most of his fellow animators left for Mintz's studio, Disney quit working on the Oswald cartoons. On his long train ride home, he came up with an idea to create another character, and retain the rights to it. He and Iwerks would go on to develop a new cartoon in secret, starring a new character which would soon become the most successful cartoon character in film history, and later became the foundation of a global entertainment empire. The first Mickey Mouse cartoon to be filmed was Plane Crazy in the summer of 1928, but it was produced as a silent and held back from release. The first Mickey Mouse film with a synchronized soundtrack, Steamboat Willie, reached the screen that fall and became a major hit, eclipsing Oswald. Plane Crazy was later given its own synchronized soundtrack and released on March 17, 1929.

=== Walter Lantz takes control ===
An ad for The Merry Old Soul featuring a version of Oswald redesigned by Manuel Moreno

Mintz, meanwhile, opened his own studio (later known as Screen Gems) consisting primarily of former Disney employees, where he continued to produce Oswald cartoons, among them the first Oswald with sound, Hen Fruit (1929). Coincidentally, Disney and Mintz each produced nine cartoons the first year and 17 the next, before others took over Oswald. Animators Hugh Harman and Rudolf Ising, unhappy with Mintz, asked Universal head Carl Laemmle to remove Mintz, suggesting they would be the ones to continue the Oswald series. Laemmle terminated Mintz's contract but, instead of hiring Harman and Ising, he opted to have the Oswald cartoons produced right on the Universal lot. Laemmle selected Walter Lantz and Bill Nolan to produce the new series of Oswald shorts (the first of which was 1929's Race Riot). The Universal-produced Oswalds had a decidedly different tone and aesthetic than the Disney shorts, with more slapstick and surreal visual gags, some contributed by Nolan unit animator Tex Avery. Avery and Lantz unit animator Manuel Moreno were handed shorts to co-direct as their creative control gradually increased. Over the next decade, Lantz produced 142 Oswald cartoons, for a total of 194 films featuring the character, spanning the work of all three producers. Walt Disney reacted positively to Lantz's takeover of the series, holding Lantz's work in high regard and forming a friendly rivalry that lasted until his death.

First color appearance of Oswald as a brief cameo in King of Jazz (1930)

As Walt Disney popularized sound cartoons with Mickey Mouse, Lantz's cartoons began to feature actual dialogue for Oswald, although most of the cartoons were still silent to begin with. Animator Bill Nolan performed the voice of Oswald in Cold Turkey (1930), the first Lantz cartoon with dialogue, and the following year Pinto Colvig, who was working as an animator and gag man at the studio, started voicing Oswald. When Colvig left the studio in 1931, child actor Mickey Rooney took over the voicing of Oswald until early in the following year. Starting in 1932, Lantz ceased to use a regular voice actor for Oswald, and many studio staff members (including Lantz himself) would take turns in voicing the character over the years. June Foray provided Oswald's voice in The Egg Cracker Suite (1943), which was the final theatrical short to feature him. She later voiced him again for an unaired radio pilot, Sally in Hollywoodland (1947). Oswald made a silent cameo appearance in the first animated sequence with both sound and color (two-strip Technicolor), a 2½-minute animated sequence of the live action movie The King of Jazz (1930), produced by Laemmle for Universal. It was not until 1934 that Oswald got his own color sound cartoons in two-strip Technicolor, Toyland Premiere (1934) and Springtime Serenade (1935).

Manuel Moreno redesigned Oswald to have white gloves on his hands, shoes on his feet, a shirt, a "cuter" face with larger eyes, a bigger head, and shorter ears. Nolan and his animators Avery, Virgil Ross, Sid Sutherland and Cecil Surry left in 1935. As Lantz gained control of the entire studio, Moreno redesigned the character as a realistic white rabbit wearing suspenders in a similar to Mickey Mouse, losing most of his unique characteristics. Moreno recalled that Lantz said to make Oswald cute and to get rid of the black on him, because Disney updated his characters' designs. The cartoons containing the new, white-furred Oswald became more child-friendly and softer due to the absence of Nolan's animators. With Happy Scouts (1938), the second-to-last Oswald film produced, the rabbit's fur went from being all-white to a combination of white and gray. Walter Lantz Productions went independent in 1935, taking Oswald's rights with it, though Universal remained the distributor of his films. At this time, Oswald lost most of his popularity and was being phased out of cartoons as the studio developed new characters.

The Oswald cartoons then returned to black-and-white, except for the last one, The Egg Cracker Suite (1943), released as a part of the Swing Symphonies series. Egg Cracker was also the only Oswald cartoon to use three-strip Technicolor. Oswald's last cartoon appearance was a cameo in The Woody Woodpecker Polka (1951), also in Technicolor, which by then had become the norm in the cartoon industry. He also appeared in a 1952 theatrical commercial for the Electric Autolite Company, with his voice being provided by Dick Beals.

=== Comic books ===
Oswald and his surrogate sons

Oswald's first appearance in comics was in a series of comic strips titled Oswald the Rabbit, which ran from February 1935 to January 1936. They were drawn by Al Stahl and published by National Allied Publications. The comics were serialized on one page of every issue of New Fun and the first issue of More Fun.

Oswald's second run in comics began in Dell Comics' New Funnies, which ran from 1942 to 1962. Following the typical development seen in most new comics, the New Funnies stories slowly morphed the character in their own direction.

At the start of the New Funnies feature, Oswald existed in a milieu reminiscent of Winnie-the-Pooh: he was portrayed as a live stuffed animal, living in a forest together with other anthropomorphized toys. These included Toby Bear, Maggie Lou the wooden doll, Hi-Yah Wahoo the turtle-faced Indian, and Woody Woodpecker—depicted as a mechanical doll filled with nuts and bolts (hence his "nutty" behavior). In 1944, with the addition of writer John Stanley, the stuffed animal motif was dropped, as were Maggie Lou, Woody, and Wahoo. Oswald and Toby became flesh and blood characters living as roommates in "Lantzville". Initially drawn by Dan Gormley, the series was later drawn by the likes of Dan Noonan and Lloyd White.

In 1948, Floyd and Lloyd were introduced as Oswald's adoptive children; Toby was relegated to the sidelines, disappearing for good in 1953. Later stories focused on Oswald adventuring with his sons, seeking odd jobs, or simply protecting the boys from the likes of rabbit-eating Reddy Fox and (from 1961) con man Gabby Gator—a character adapted from contemporary Woody Woodpecker cartoon shorts. This era of Oswald comics typically featured the art of Jack Bradbury, known also for his Mickey Mouse work.

After the assassination of John F. Kennedy by Lee Harvey Oswald, the name "Oswald" came to have negative connotations.

He made brief appearances in the Woody Woodpecker comics series until it ended in the 1970s. Through the end of the 20th century, the comics produced outside the U.S. carried on the look and story style of the Dell Oswald stories.

In 2010, Oswald starred in the digi-comic series Epic Mickey: Tales of the Wasteland, a prequel to the Epic Mickey video game, sharing what the Wasteland was like before Mickey arrived there.

In 2011, Oswald starred in the Norwegian Disney comic story "En magisk jul!", written by David Gerstein and drawn by Mark Kausler. It is based on and takes place in the times of the classic Oswald shorts from 1927 to 1928. The story was later reprinted as "Just Like Magic" in the American Disney comic Walt Disney's and Stories #726 (2015).

=== Disney re-acquires Oswald rights and trademarks ===
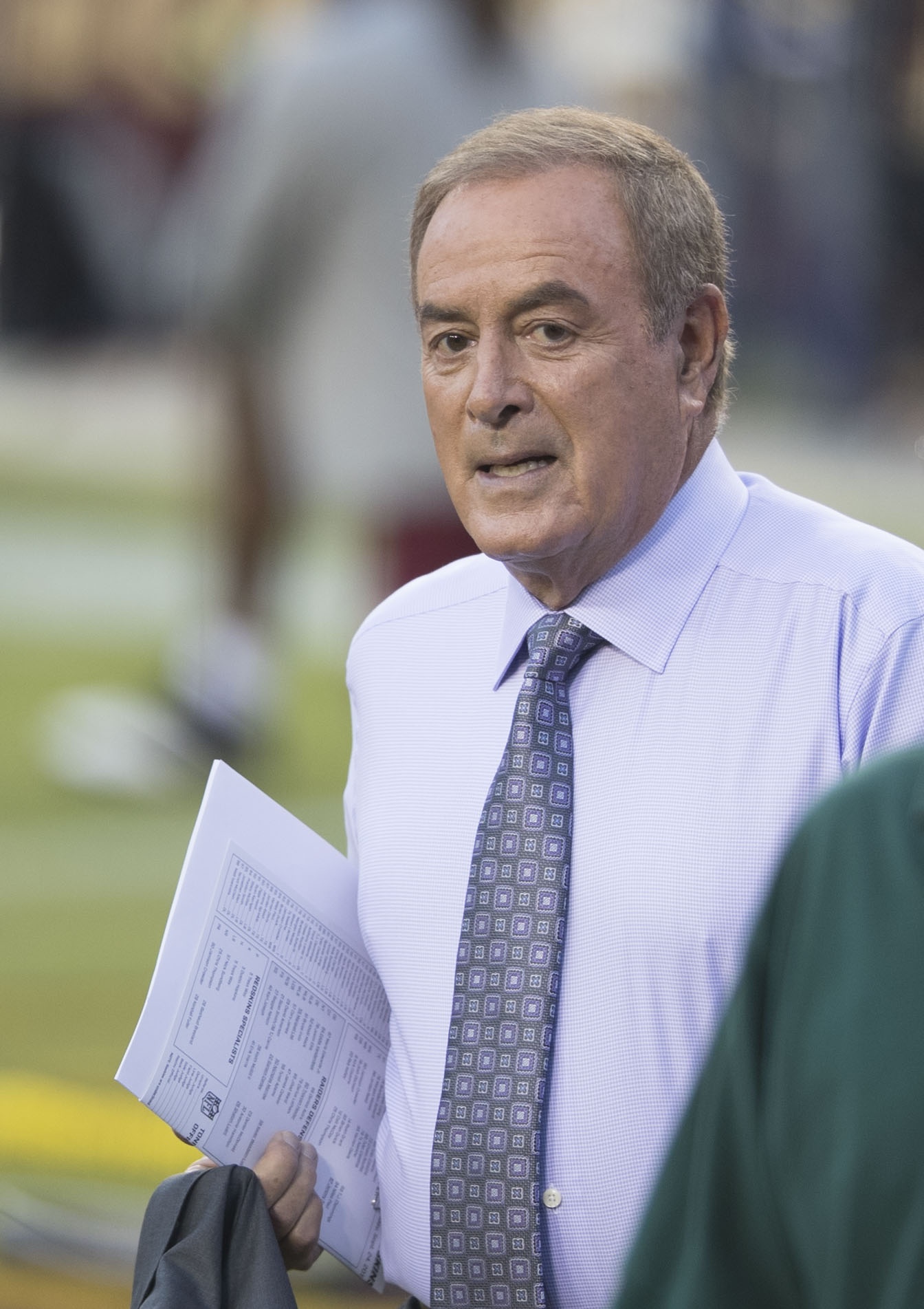
Al Michaels acknowledged that his contract negotiations had effectively traded him for Oswald, and spoke favorably of the deal.

Walter Lantz Productions owned Oswald's rights and trademarks until its closure; Lantz sold his assets to Universal Pictures in 1985 after his retirement, effectively returning the character to the studio.

In February 2006, Disney CEO Bob Iger initiated a trade with NBCUniversal in which a number of minor assets, including the rights to Oswald and the 27 shorts that Walt Disney had worked on, were acquired by The Walt Disney Company in exchange for sending sportscaster Al Michaels from Disney's ABC and ESPN to NBC Sports. At the time, ABC had lost its contract for NFL broadcast rights, and despite recently signing a long-term contract with ESPN, Michaels was interested in rejoining broadcast partner John Madden at NBC for the Sunday night package. Universal transferred the trademark of the character to Disney, and in exchange, Disney released Michaels from his employment contract, allowing him to sign with NBC.

The deal included the trademark rights to the character and the 27 Disney-produced Oswald shorts along with the handover of any physical Disney-directed Oswald material Universal still had in their possession. Iger had been interested in the property because of an internal design document for a video game, which became Epic Mickey. Walt Disney's daughter, Diane Disney Miller, issued the following statement after the deal was announced:

When Bob [Iger] was named CEO, he told me he wanted to bring Oswald back to Disney, and I appreciate that he is a man of his word. Having Oswald around again is going to be a lot of fun.

Around the same time, the Kansas City Chiefs and New York Jets made a similar deal, the Chiefs giving the Jets a draft pick as compensation for releasing coach Herm Edwards from his contract. Referring to this trade, Michaels said:

Oswald is definitely worth more than a fourth-round draft choice. I'm going to be a trivia answer someday.

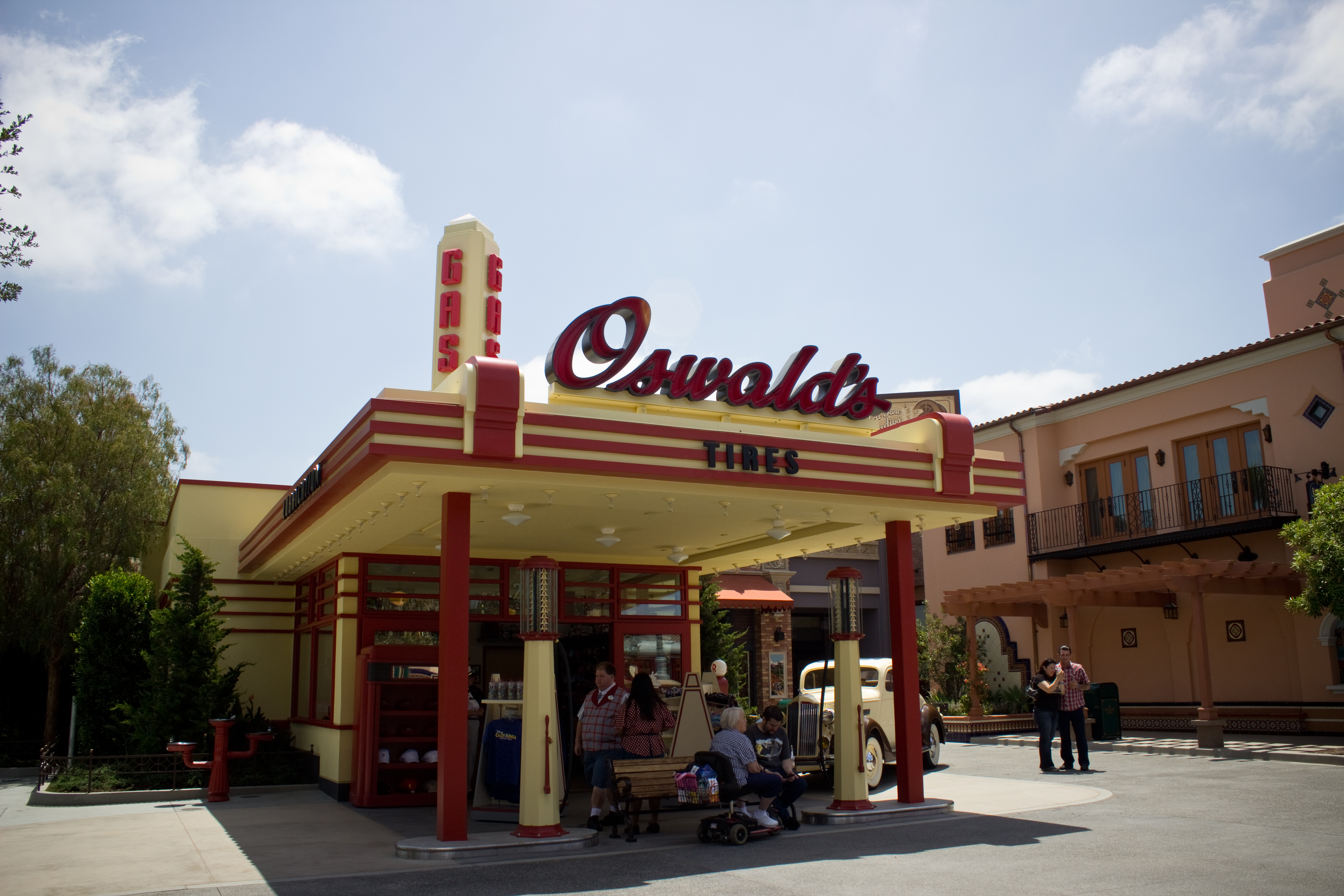
Oswald's Service Station on the Buena Vista Street at Disney California Adventure

In January 2007, a T-shirt line from Comme des Garçons seems to have constituted the first new Disney Oswald merchandise. Following in December was a two-disc DVD set, The Adventures of Oswald the Lucky Rabbit, included in Wave Seven of the Walt Disney Treasures DVD series. Several Oswald collectors' figurines and a limited edition grayscale plush toy appeared shortly after the DVD set's release. The Disney Store also began to introduce Oswald into its merchandise lines, starting with a canvas print and Christmas ornament that became available in Fall 2007. A standard-issue color plush toy matching Oswald's appearance in Epic Mickey appeared in late 2010. This was followed by an ongoing roll-out of clothing and other products at the Disney Store, various chain stores, and the Disney California Adventure theme park.

In 2012, the newly redesigned Buena Vista Street at Disney California Adventure included Oswald's Filling Station, an Oswald merchandise stand themed as a 1920s gas station. The shop exclusively sells "Oswald the Lucky Rabbit" merchandise such as "Oswald Ears" hats (a similar style to the popular Mickey Mouse Club black mouse-eared caps), as well as shirts, t-shirts, plush toys, pins, mugs, and other special Oswald items. In 2014, Oswald began making appearances in the area near the shop.

=== Video games ===
In 1995, Oswald briefly appeared in Férias Frustradas do Pica-Pau, a Woody Woodpecker video game released for the Master System and the Mega Drive in Brazil only.

In 2006, Oswald made a cameo in the intro of a Panchiko machine game called Woody Woodpecker CR 2.

Oswald is one of the main characters in the 2010 video game Epic Mickey and its 2024 remake, Epic Mickey: Rebrushed. The world of Epic Mickey takes place in "Wasteland", a setting that mirrors elements of Disneyland but as a home for "forgotten" Disney characters, including Oswald, who rules over the environment. Oswald fashioned Wasteland after Disneyland, although it is darker and distorted. He implements his likeness into areas Mickey Mouse normally appears, such as the iconic Partners statue with Walt Disney and other imagery throughout the town. Oswald was the first cartoon character to be "forgotten" and eventually lose his relevance, now inhabiting Wasteland. Oswald also dislikes Mickey for stealing his popularity that he felt he deserved. Despite his resentment, Oswald tries to maintain peace and make Wasteland a better place for forgotten characters, especially his "bunny children" and his wife Ortensia the Cat.

Epic Mickey 2: The Power of Two is a video game that was released on November 18, 2012. Unlike the previous game, Epic Mickey 2 features full voiced cut-scenes with Frank Welker (Welker had also provided Oswald's vocal effects in the previous game) as Oswald's first voice actor in an Oswald the Lucky Rabbit production from Disney. Bill Nolan was Oswald's first voice actor in 1929, when Walter Lantz produced the Oswald cartoons.

Tetsuya Nomura, creator and lead producer of the Kingdom Hearts franchise, had requested for Oswald's use in Kingdom Hearts III, but the response from Disney was that the character would be "too difficult" to use, with no further clarification or details from Disney. Nomura cites Oswald as one of his favorite Disney characters.

On November 30, 2023, Oswald was added as a playable racer in Disney Speedstorm during its fifth season alongside Ortensia, while he appears in Disney Dreamlight Valley as part of its "Eternity Isle" expansion. He is voiced by David Errigo Jr. in both appearances.

=== Disney projects ===
In 2012, sketch animation from a lost 1928 cartoon, Harem Scarem, was compiled by archivists at Disney and released to help celebrate Oswald's 85th Anniversary. He made an appearance in a 2013 throwback-style Mickey Mouse cartoon, Get a Horse!, as well as in the 2023 live-action animated short Once Upon a Studio, created to mark Disney's centenary.

While only 19 of 26 cartoons were previously known to have survived, a couple of Oswald's lost cartoons were found in the 2010s. In 2015, the British Film Institute's National Archives were found to hold his Sleigh Bells (1928) footage. The BFI and Walt Disney Animation Studios worked to restore the short. Long-term Disney animator David Bossert wrote a book, Oswald the Lucky Rabbit: The Search for the Lost Disney Cartoons which was released in 2017. A Japanese man, Yasushi Watanabe, read the book and discovered that he had a missing 1928 Oswald cartoon, Neck & Neck, since he was a teenager.

A series centered on Oswald was in development with the project announced in 2019 for a potential release on Disney+. Disney Television Animation veteran Matt Danner revealed that a series was in development as a follow-up for the team behind Legend of the Three Caballeros, but that they "got broken up and scattered to the wind". He expressed hope that the series could still be revived in the future and further hinted that another team would develop it, because Disney was still heavily invested in wanting to revive the character.

On December 1, 2022, an online hand-drawn animated Oswald short by Walt Disney Animation Studios was released. The short was directed by Eric Goldberg, scored by Dean McClure, and produced by Dorothy McKim, with Mark Henn and Randy Haycock working on the animation alongside Goldberg. It marked Oswald's first short produced by Disney, as well as his first short ever since Feed the Kitty (1938). A few weeks later, a hand-drawn animation piece by Disney Animation featuring Oswald was released, meant to promote a line of products developed by Disney and Givenchy. Restored public domain versions of the shorts Trolley Troubles and All Wet (both 1927) were released on Disney+ in September 2023.

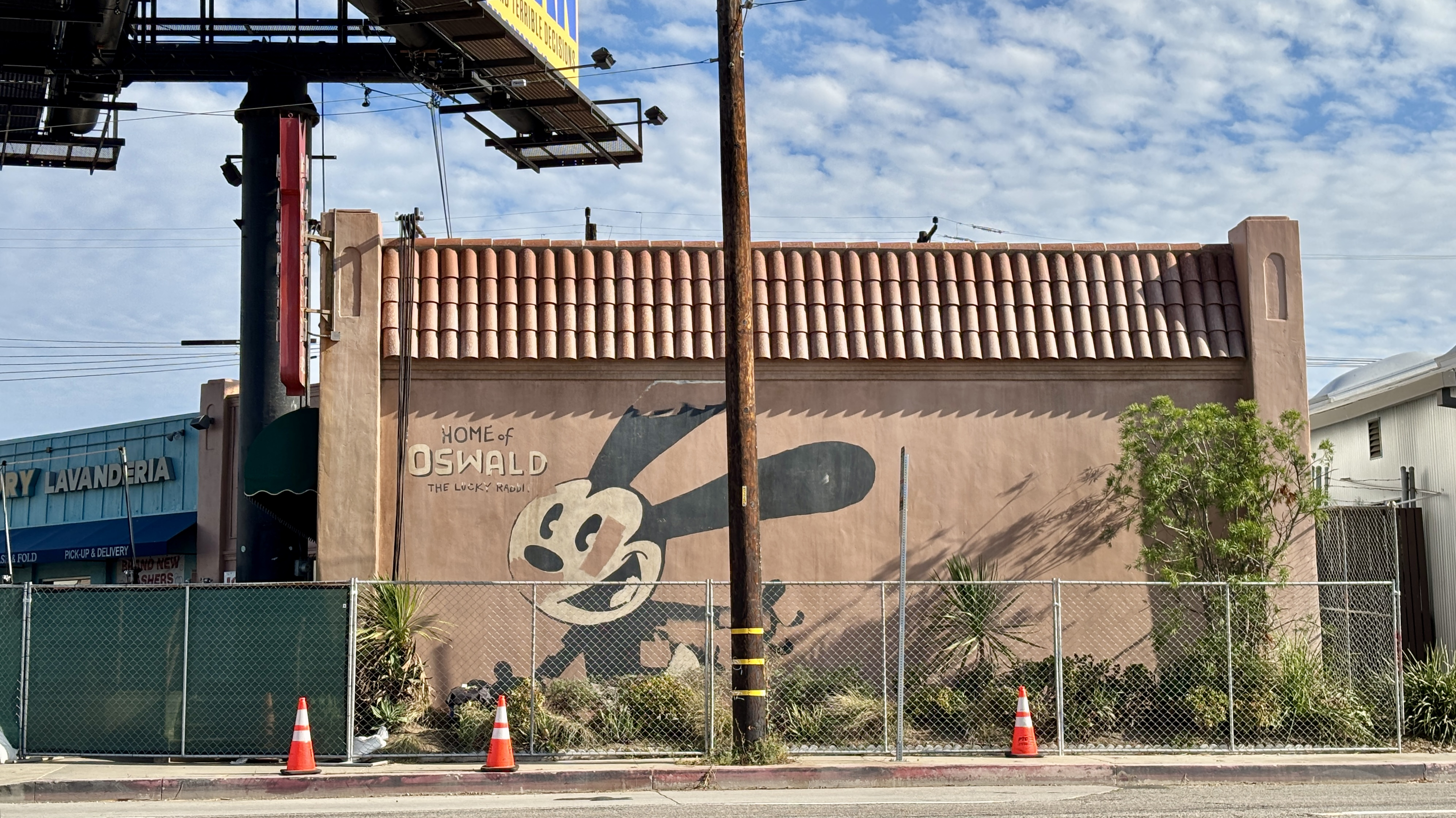
Oswald the Lucky Rabbit mural on an outdoor set for the upcoming TV series

In March 2025, it was reported that Jon Favreau was developing a live-action animation hybrid series based on the character for Disney+ from Walt Disney Studios. In June 2025, it was announced Ravi Cabot-Conyers, Mykal-Michelle Harris and Ryder Allen were cast in leading roles. It was later announced that Amy Sedaris was cast as main character Allen's mother. Filming started at Disneyland in late July with Kathryn Hahn joining the cast of the series. In August 2025, Steve Martin and Al Madrigal joined the cast. The series is set for a February 2027 release.

== Merchandise ==
Shortly after the rabbit starred in his black-and-white animated silent shorts between 1927 and 1928, he sold merchandise for Universal: a chocolate-covered marshmallow candy bar, a stencil set, and a pin-backed button. In 2004 and 2005, Oswald products became popular in Japan and were primarily made available as prizes in UFO catchers and as official merchandise in Universal Studios Japan, manufactured by Taito and/or Medicom, these products included puppets, inflatable dolls, keyrings, and watches. Oswald made his first Disneyland appearance at Tokyo Disneyland on March 31, 2010, as an Easter float. As of October 2017, Oswald has a Service Station at Disney's California Adventure (near the entrance) that only sells exclusive "Oswald The Lucky Rabbit" merchandise including Oswald ears, hats (baseball caps), shirts, T-shirts, plates, coats, cups, mugs, plush toys, key-chains, and much more.

== Theme park appearances ==
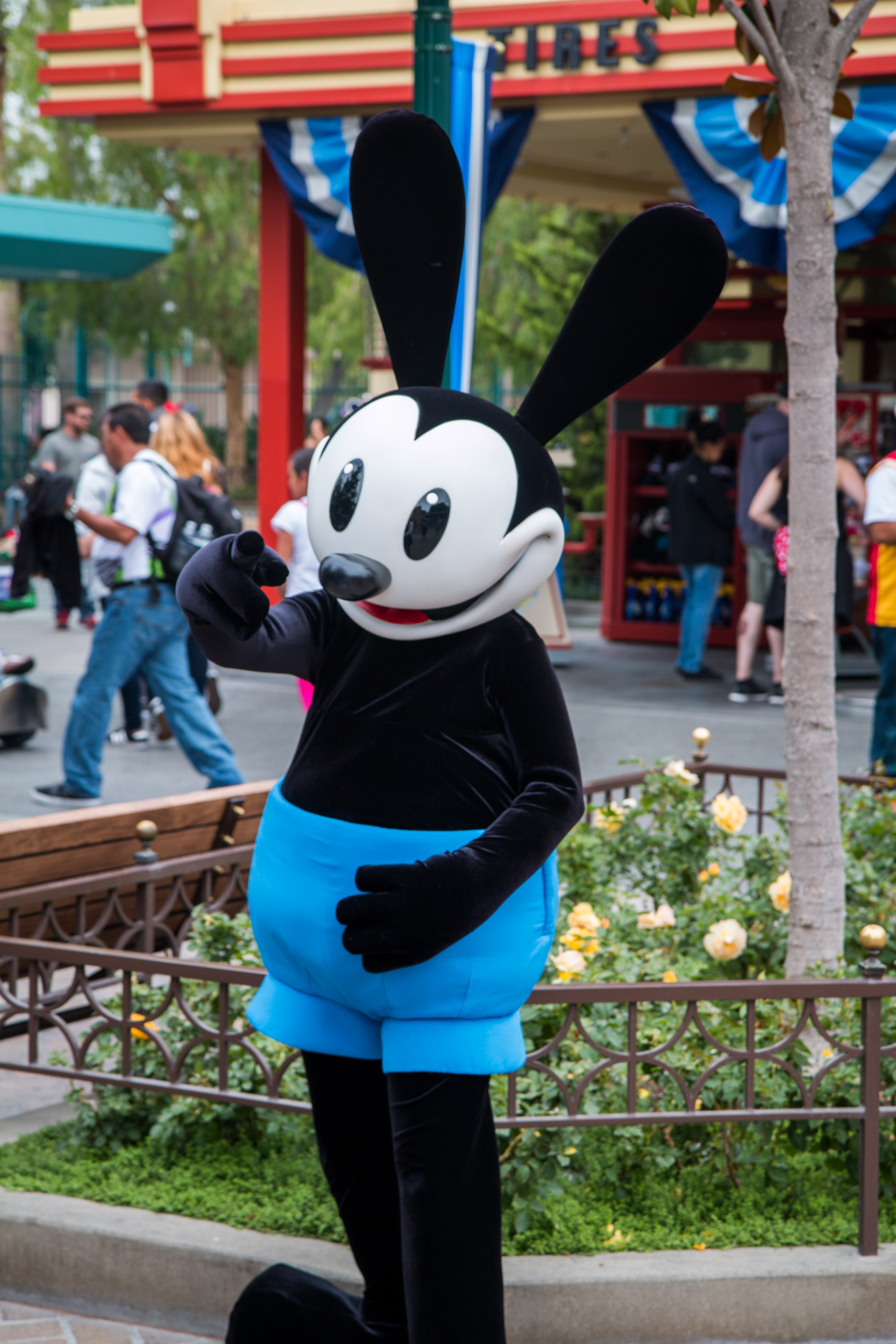
Oswald on Buena Vista Street in Disney California Adventure Park

The Oswald character showed up at the parks in Florida and California on the day Disney reacquired Oswald and made further appearances at the time.

In 2010, Tokyo Disneyland produced a float featuring Oswald for their first Easter holiday event.

In 2011, Oswald appeared with other vintage Disney characters on the construction walls for Disney California Adventure Park's new entrance. Oswald also appeared on a poster as a magician's rabbit in Town Square Theater in Magic Kingdom park. Oswald appeared on various items of clothing available for purchase at Disneyland Paris in the shops on Main Street USA.

In 2012, Disney California Adventure park at the Disneyland Resort reopened with a new entry area called Buena Vista Street, themed to 1920s Los Angeles. Oswald's Service Station is a 1920s gas station (housing a gift shop) located at the north end of the street and features Oswald prominently in its logo. Oswald has been spotted making appearances near his station. In the same year, Oswald ear hats appeared at the Emporium at Walt Disney World in Florida.

As of May 2014, Oswald can be spotted on the exit of The Seven Dwarves ride at Magic Kingdom, Orlando. He is carved into a tree near the exit door. During the same year a new Oswald costumed character began meet-and-greets at Tokyo DisneySea on April 1; on September 14 of the same year, Oswald began making appearances on Buena Vista Street at Disney California Adventure.

On June 2, 2018, at the FanDaze event Oswald's spouse, Ortensia accompanied him as a VIP guest in Disneyland Paris. They also performed in the show, "Oh My, Ortensia".

Oswald was featured on the medal of the Walt Disney World Marathon Weekend 10K. The event took place on January 7, 2022, as part of runDisney's WDW Marathon Weekend.

Oswald made a debut in Hong Kong Disneyland in January 2023 as part of the celebration for the 100th anniversary of The Walt Disney Company.

From January 20 to February 15, 2023, at Disney California Adventure, Oswald and his wife Ortensia appeared to celebrate Chinese New Year, which marks Ortensia's debut in an American theme park.

== Home media ==
- In the 1940s and 1950s, Oswald titles could still be found in 16mm and 8mm film catalogs.
- Some earlier Oswald shorts, including all Disney era shorts, are in the public domain. Thus, these have been available for some years in various lower-quality video and DVD compilations. Some are lost due to Universal's incomplete archive of the films.
- An attempted restoration of the then-surviving Disney Oswald shorts, under the title The Adventures of Oswald the Lucky Rabbit, appeared as a two-disc volume in Walt Disney Treasures: Wave Seven, released on December 11, 2007. The cartoons included Ozzie of the Mounted, Tall Timber, and a much-extended version of Bright Lights, all newly rediscovered at the time.
- Six Walter Lantz Oswald cartoons, including Hells Heels and Toyland Premiere, have been included in The Woody Woodpecker and Friends Classic Cartoon Collection DVD.
- Five additional Lantz Oswald shorts, including Wax Works and Springtime Serenade, are included in The Woody Woodpecker and Friends Classic Cartoon Collection: Volume 2 DVD.
- The full version of Oh, What a Knight is included as an unlockable cartoon in Epic Mickey by collecting various film reels in the game.
- The restored version of Hungry Hobos is included as part of the bonus features in the release of the Walt Disney Signature Collection edition of Snow White and the Seven Dwarfs on Blu-ray. Although the short is not included on the disc itself, a digital code is included with the Blu-ray that "unlocks" the short for viewing.
- The shorts My Pal Paul and Africa are fully restored and included as extras in the Criterion release of King of Jazz.
- The short Poor Papa was restored and included as an extra in the Walt Disney Signature Collection edition of Pinocchio.

== Reception ==
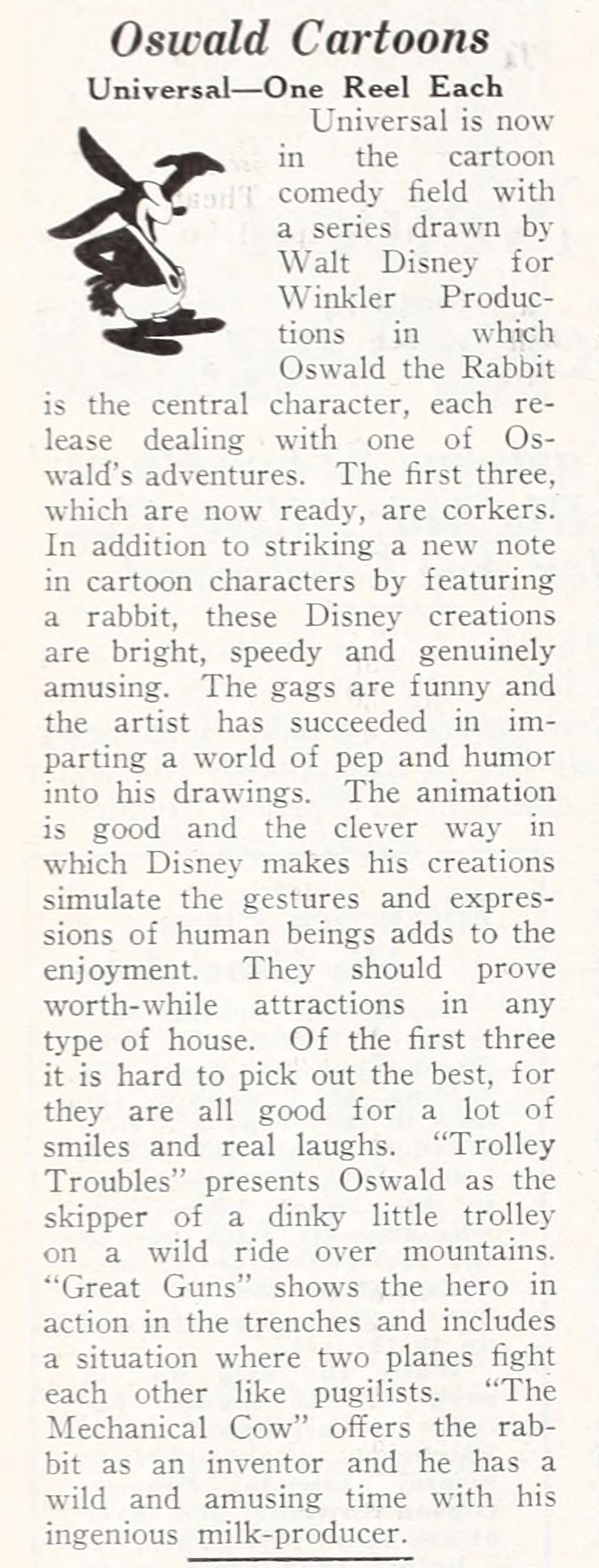
Review of Oswald Cartoons, The Moving Picture World, August 1927

During the 1920s, the Oswald shorts, as well as Oswald himself, were extremely popular and had received substantial critical acclaim. The Film Daily noted that the series was "one of the best sellers of the 'U[niversal]' short subject program". According to The Moving Picture World, Oswald had "accomplished the astounding feat of jumping into the first-run favor overnight".

With the release of Trolley Troubles, The Film Daily wrote: "As conductor on a 'Toonerville' trolley, Oswald is a riot. This ... you can book on pure faith, and our solemn word that they have the goods".

The Moving Picture World noted that Oswald was "good for a lot of smiles and real laughs. Trolley Troubles presents Oswald as the skipper of a dinky little trolley on a wild ride over mountains".

According to The Moving Picture World:

If the first of these new cartoon comedies for Universal release is an indication of what is to come, then this series is destined to win much popular favor. They are cleverly drawn, well executed, brimful of action, and fairly abounding in humorous situations. Oswald the Lucky Rabbit is all of that. Some of his experiences are hilarious and breathtaking.

With the release of Oh, Teacher, Moving Picture World wrote that it "lives up to the promise of the first ... as a clever, peppy, and amusing series of cartoons that should prove popular in any type of house. This one deals with Oswald as a school kid and introduces a cat as his rival. It contains some of the best gags we have seen in cartoons".

With the release of The Mechanical Cow, Moving Picture World wrote that Oswald "has a wild and amusing time with his ingenuous milk producer".

With the release of Great Guns, Moving Picture World wrote that Oswald is a "hero in action in the trenches and [in] a situation where two planes fight each other like pugilists". They found that Great Guns was "chock full of humor" and wrote that "this series is bound to be popular in all types of houses if the present standard is maintained".

Moving Picture World also wrote of the series:

In addition to striking a new note in cartoon characters by featuring a rabbit, these Disney creations are bright, speedy and genuinely amusing ... The animation is good and the clever way in which Disney makes his creations simulate the gestures and expressions of human beings adds to the enjoyment. They should provide worthwhile attractions in any type of house.

In addition:

Oswald looks like a real contender. Walt Disney is doing this new series. Funny how the cartoon artists never hit on a rabbit before. Oswald with his long ears has a chance for a lot of new comedy gags and makes the most of them. Universal has been looking for a good animated subject for the last year. They've found it.

In the modern era, animation historian David Gerstein notes:

Disney has done some new projects with Oswald since recovering him. He's co-starred with Mickey in a video game series [...] called Epic Mickey. Kids who have discovered those games have discovered the Oswald films, and it's fascinating to see that Oswald is a genuinely popular character with kids today. If you ask a high schooler if they know Oswald the Lucky Rabbit, a surprising number will say yes. [There] is just something vital about these characters that, when presented the right way, [connects] with all ages.

Oswald won Best New Character in both Readers' Choice and Editors' Choice in Nintendo Power's Best of 2010 awards.

Tetsuya Nomura, creator and lead producer of the Kingdom Hearts franchise, lists Oswald as one of his favorite Disney characters.

== See also ==
- Animation in the United States during the silent era
- Golden age of American animation
