= List of Betty Boop films and appearances =

Betty Boop filmography
- Short films: 89
- Television movies: 2

The following is a list of all theatrical appearances of the Fleischer Studios cartoon character Betty Boop. She was featured in 127 theatrical cartoons between 1930 and 1939; eighty-nine in her own series and thirty-eight in the Talkartoons, Screen Songs and Color Classics series. This does not include content made by external artists or studios following the characters entry in the public domain in 2026.

Starting in 2013, Olive Films released the non-public domain cartoons on Blu-ray and DVD in four "Essential Collection" volumes, although they were restored from the original television internegatives that carried the altered opening and closing credits. Volume 1 was released on August 20, 2013, and Volume 2 on September 24, 2013. Volume 3 was released on April 29, 2014, and Volume 4 on September 30, 2014.

In May 2022, animator and archivist Steve Stanchfield released a Blu-ray collection titled "The Other Betty Boop Cartoons, Volume 1" through his label Thunderbean Animation, which features public domain cartoons that were not on the Olive Films sets. It includes the long-lost, recently discovered cartoon Honest Love and True. The original incarnation of Betty Boop that debuted in 1930 went into the public domain in the United States on January 1, 2026.

On May 26, 2026, Thad Komorowski's label Cartoon Logic (distributed by ClassicFlix) released a Blu-ray collection called "Fleischer Cartoons: Greatest Hits, Volume 1". This Blu-ray features public domain Talkartoons and Betty Boop cartoons that were previously released in bad condition, restored in 4K, largely from the original studio negatives.

== Appearances in Talkartoons, Screen Songs and Color Classics series ==
Note: see the Talkartoons, Screen Songs and Color Classics filmographies for additional respective entries in all three series.

=== 1930 ===
No.	Film	Animated By	Original release date	Series	Availability	Notes
1	Dizzy Dishes	Grim Natwick, Ted Sears	August 9	Talkartoons	Betty Boop Essential Collection (BBEC) Volume 2^{1}	First appearance; Copyright renewed; entered the public domain on January 1, 2026
2	Barnacle Bill	Rudy Zamora, Seymour Kneitel	August 25	Talkartoons	Fleischer Cartoons: Greatest Hits Volume 1	Copyright renewed; entered the public domain on January 1, 2026
3	Accordion Joe	Ted Sears, Grim Natwick	December 13	Talkartoons	no modern physical media	Copyright renewed; entered the public domain on January 1, 2026
4	Mysterious Mose	Willard Bowsky, Ted Sears, Grim Natwick (uncredited)	December 29	Talkartoons	Fleischer Cartoons: Greatest Hits Volume 1	Copyright renewed; entered the public domain on January 1, 2026
=== 1931 ===
5	Teacher's Pest	Grim Natwick, Seymour Kneitel	February 7	Talkartoons	no modern physical media	Brief cameo; Copyright renewed; will enter the public domain on January 1, 2027
6	The Bum Bandit	Willard Bowsky, Al Eugster, Grim Natwick (uncredited)	April 6	Talkartoons	BBDC VHS Volume 1	Betty is named "Dangerous Nan McGrew"; First time Betty Boop is seen in her slender physique; Copyright renewed; will enter the public domain on January 1, 2027
7	Silly Scandals	Grim Natwick	May 23	Talkartoons	BBDC VHS Volume 1	First time Betty is named, although only as "Betty" (no surname is given); Copyright renewed; will enter the public domain on January 1, 2027
8	Bimbo's Initiation	Grim Natwick (uncredited)	July 27	Talkartoons	BBEC Volume 2^{1}	Placed at #37 in the book The 50 Greatest Cartoons; Copyright renewed; will enter the public domain on January 1, 2027
9	Bimbo's Express	Unknown	August 22	Talkartoons	BBDC VHS Volume 1	Copyright renewed; will enter the public domain on January 1, 2027
10	Minding the Baby	James Culhane, Bernard Wolf	September 28	Talkartoons	BBDC VHS Volume 1	First time Betty's full name appears on the titles, stylized as "Betty-Boop"; Copyright renewed; will enter the public domain on January 1, 2027
11	In the Shade of the Old Apple Sauce	Unknown	October 16	Talkartoons	no modern physical media	Lost film.; Copyright renewed; will enter the public domain on January 1, 2027
12	Kitty from Kansas City (music by Rudy Vallée)	Unknown	October 31	Screen Songs	BBDC VHS Volume 2	Named "Kitty"; Copyright renewed; will enter the public domain on January 1, 2027
13	Mask-A-Raid	Al Eugster, James Culhane	November 9	Talkartoons	BBDC VHS Volume 1	First time Betty Boop is depicted as a human as opposed to a dog- with dog ears replaced by earrings.; Copyright renewed; will enter the public domain on January 1, 2027
14	By the Light of the Silvery Moon	Seymour Kneitel, Myron Waldman	November 14	Screen Songs	no modern physical media	Betty Boop appears briefly topless in a bathtub.; Copyright renewed; will enter the public domain on January 1, 2027
15	Jack and the Beanstalk	Unknown	November 22	Talkartoons	BBDC VHS Volume 4	Final time Betty Boop is depicted as a dog.; Copyright renewed; will enter the public domain on January 1, 2027
16	Dizzy Red Riding Hood	Grim Natwick	December 12	Talkartoons	BBDC VHS Volume 4	Copyright renewed; will enter the public domain on January 1, 2027
=== 1932 ===
17	Any Rags?	Willard Bowsky, Thomas Bonfiglio	January 5	Talkartoons	BBDC VHS Volume 6	Surviving master negative has original opening title card intact; Copyright renewed; will enter the public domain on January 1, 2028
18	Boop-Oop-a-Doop	Unknown	January 16	Talkartoons	BBEC Volume 2	First use of the song "Sweet Betty" which would become the theme song for the Betty Boop series.; Copyright renewed; will enter the public domain on January 1, 2028
19	The Robot	Unknown	February 8	Talkartoons	BBDC VHS Volume 3	A Bimbo cartoon, seemingly held over from earlier in production- Bimbo appears in a primitive design.; Bimbo's girlfriend is largely a generic one-off, but is drawn to resemble Betty in a few close-ups that were likely inserted later.; Copyright renewed; will enter the public domain on January 1, 2028
20	Wait 'Till the Sun Shines, Nellie (music by The Round Towners Quartet)	Unknown	March 4	Screen Songs	no modern physical media	Copyright renewed; will enter the public domain on January 1, 2028
21	Minnie the Moocher (music by Cab Calloway)	Willard Bowsky, Ralph Somerville	March 11	Talkartoons	BBEC Volume 3	Named #20 in the book The 50 Greatest Cartoons; Copyright renewed; will enter the public domain on January 1, 2028
22	Swim or Sink	James Culhane, David Tendlar	March 13	Talkartoons	BBDC VHS Volume 2	Copyright renewed; will enter the public domain on January 1, 2028
23	Crazy Town	James Culhane, David Tendlar	March 25	Talkartoons	BBDC VHS Volume 3	Copyright renewed; will enter the public domain on January 1, 2028
24	Just One More Chance	Unknown	April 1	Screen Songs	no modern physical media	Copyright renewed; will enter the public domain on January 1, 2028
25	The Dancing Fool	Seymour Kneitel, Benard Wolf	April 6	Talkartoons	BBDC VHS Volume 3	Copyright renewed; will enter the public domain on January 1, 2028
26	Chess-Nuts	James Culhane, William Henning	April 18	Talkartoons	BBEC Volume 1	Copyright renewed; will enter the public domain on January 1, 2028
27	Oh! How I Hate to Get Up in the Morning	Unknown	April 22	Screen Songs	BBDC VHS Volume 3	Copyright renewed; will enter the public domain on January 1, 2028
28	A-Hunting We Will Go	Al Eugster, Rudolph Eggeman	May 3	Talkartoons	BBDC VHS Volume 2	Copyright renewed; will enter the public domain on January 1, 2028
29	Let Me Call You Sweetheart (Music by Ethel Merman)	Unknown	May 20	Screen Songs	BBDC VHS Volume 3	Copyright renewed; will enter the public domain on January 1, 2028
30	Admission Free	Thomas Johnson, Rudolph Eggeman	June 12	Talkartoons	BBDC VHS Volume 3	Copyright renewed; will enter the public domain on January 1, 2028
31	The Betty Boop Limited	Willard Bowsky, Thomas Bonfiglio	July 18	Talkartoons	BBEC Volume 2	Final entry in the Talkartoons series.; Copyright renewed; will enter the public domain on January 1, 2028
32	You Try Somebody Else (Music by Ethel Merman)	Unknown	July 29	Screen Songs	BBDC VHS Volume 2	Brief Cameo; Copyright renewed; will enter the public domain on January 1, 2028
33	Rudy Vallee Melodies (Music by Rudy Vallée)	Unknown	August 5	Screen Songs	BBDC VHS Volume 2	Copyright renewed; will enter the public domain on January 1, 2028
34	Just a Gigolo (Music by Irene Bordoni)	Unknown	September 9	Screen Songs	BBDC VHS Volume 3	Copyright renewed; will enter the public domain on January 1, 2028
35	Romantic Melodies (Music by Arthur Tracy)	Unknown	October 21	Screen Songs	BBDC VHS Volume 3	Copyright renewed; will enter the public domain on January 1, 2028
36	Time on My Hands (Music by Ethel Merman)	Unknown	December 23	Screen Songs	no modern physical media	Betty Boop appears as a mermaid.; Copyright renewed; will enter the public domain on January 1, 2028
=== 1933 ===
37	Popular Melodies (Music by Arthur Jarrett)	Unknown	April 7	Screen Songs	BBDC VHS Volume 3	Final appearance in the Screen Songs series.; Copyright renewed; will enter the public domain on January 1, 2029
=== 1934 ===
38	Poor Cinderella	Seymour Kneitel, Roland Crandall, William Henning	August 3	Color Classics	BBEC Volume 4	Only appearance in the Color Classics series.; Betty Boop's only appearance in color.; Copyright not renewed; entered the public domain in 1962

== Betty Boop series ==
=== 1932 ===
No.	Film	Animated by	Original release date	Availability	Notes
1	Stopping the Show (with Fanny Brice and Maurice Chevalier)	Roland Crandall, Rudolph Eggeman	12 August	BBEC Volume 4^{1}	Copyright renewed; will enter the public domain on January 1, 2028
2	Betty Boop's Bizzy Bee	Seymour Kneitel, Bernard Wolf	19 August	BBEC Volume 2^{2}	Copyright renewed; will enter the public domain on January 1, 2028
3	Betty Boop, M.D.	Willard Bowsky, Thomas Goodson	2 September	BBEC Volume 1^{3}	Copyright renewed; will enter the public domain on January 1, 2028
4	Betty Boop's Bamboo Isle (music by Royal Samoans and Miri)	Seymour Kneitel, Bernard Wolf	23 September	BBEC Volume 1	Copyright renewed; will enter the public domain on January 1, 2028
5	Betty Boop's Ups and Downs	Willard Bowsky, Ugo D'Orsi	14 October	BBEC Volume 2	Copyright renewed; will enter the public domain on January 1, 2028
6	Betty Boop for President	Seymour Kneitel, Roland Crandall	4 November	BBEC Volume 1	Copyright renewed; will enter the public domain on January 1, 2028
7	I'll Be Glad When You're Dead You Rascal You (music by Louis Armstrong)	Willard Bowsky, Ralph Somerville	25 November	BBEC Volume 3^{4}	Copyright renewed; will enter the public domain on January 1, 2028
8	Betty Boop's Museum	William Henning, Reuben Timinsky	16 December	BBEC Volume 2	Copyright renewed; will enter the public domain on January 1, 2028
=== 1933 ===
No.	Film	Animated by	Original release date	Availability	Notes
9	Betty Boop's Ker-Choo	Seymour Kneitel, Bernard Wolf	6 January	TOBBC Volume 1 (Public Domain)	Copyright not renewed; entered the public domain in 1962
10	Betty Boop's Crazy Inventions	Willard Bowsky, Ugo D'Orsi	27 January	Fleischer Cartoons: Greatest Hits, Volume 1 (Public Domain)	Copyright not renewed; entered the public domain in 1962
11	Is My Palm Read	David Tendlar, William Henning	17 February	TOBBC Volume 1 (Public Domain)	Copyright not renewed; entered the public domain in 1962
12	Betty Boop's Penthouse	Willard Bowsky	10 March	BBEC Volume 1	Copyright renewed; will enter the public domain on January 1, 2029
13	Snow-White (music by Cab Calloway)	Roland Crandall	31 March	BBEC Volume 4	Copyright renewed; will enter the public domain on January 1, 2029
14	Betty Boop's Birthday Party	Seymour Kneitel, Myron Waldman	21 April	BBEC Volume 1	Copyright renewed; will enter the public domain on January 1, 2029
15	Betty Boop's May Party	David Tendlar, William Henning	12 May	BBEC Volume 1	Copyright renewed; will enter the public domain on January 1, 2029
16	Betty Boop's Big Boss	Bernard Wolf, David Tendlar	2 June	BBEC Volume 2	Copyright renewed; will enter the public domain on January 1, 2029
17	Mother Goose Land	Roland Crandall, Seymour Kneitel	23 June	BBEC Volume 3	Copyright renewed; will enter the public domain on January 1, 2029
18	Popeye the Sailor	Seymour Kneitel, Roland Crandall	14 July	PTS Volume 1^{5}	Theatrical debut of Popeye; Copyright renewed; will enter the public domain on January 1, 2029
19	The Old Man of the Mountain (music by Cab Calloway)	Bernard Wolf, Thomas Johnson	4 August	BBEC Volume 3	Copyright renewed; will enter the public domain on January 1, 2029
20	I Heard (music by Don Redman)	Willard Bowsky, Myron Waldman	1 September	BBEC Volume 3	Copyright renewed; will enter the public domain on January 1, 2029
21	Morning, Noon and Night (music by Rubinoff)	David Tendlar, Thomas Johnson	6 October	BBEC Volume 2	Copyright renewed; will enter the public domain on January 1, 2029
22	Betty Boop's Hallowe'en Party	Willard Bowsky, Myron Waldman	3 November	BBEC Volume 1	Copyright renewed; will enter the public domain on January 1, 2029
23	Parade of the Wooden Soldiers (music by Rubinoff)	William Henning, Seymour Kneitel	1 December	BBEC Volume 4	Copyright renewed; will enter the public domain on January 1, 2029
=== 1934 ===
No.	Film	Animated by	Original release date	Availability	Notes
24	She Wronged Him Right	Roland Crandall, Thomas Johnson	5 January	BBEC Volume 4	Copyright renewed; will enter the public domain on January 1, 2030
25	Red Hot Mamma	Willard Bowsky, David Tendlar	2 February	BBEC Volume 4	Copyright renewed; will enter the public domain on January 1, 2030
26	Ha! Ha! Ha!	Seymour Kneitel, Roland Crandall	2 March	BBEC Volume 3	Final Fleischer theatrical appearance of Koko the Clown; Copyright renewed; will enter the public domain on January 1, 2030
27	Betty in Blunderland	Roland Crandall, Thomas Johnson	6 April	Fleischer Cartoons: Greatest Hits, Volume 1 (Public Domain)	Copyright not renewed; entered the public domain in 1962
28	Betty Boop's Rise to Fame		18 May	BBEC Volume 1 (Public Domain)	Copyright not renewed; entered the public domain in 1962
29	Betty Boop's Trial	Myron Waldman, Hicks Lokey	15 June	BBEC Volume 1	Copyright renewed; will enter the public domain on January 1, 2030
30	Betty Boop's Life Guard	Willard Bowsky, David Tendlar	13 July	BBEC Volume 1	Copyright renewed; will enter the public domain on January 1, 2030
31	There's Something About a Soldier	Myron Waldman, Hicks Lokey	17 August	BBEC Volume 4	Copyright renewed; will enter the public domain on January 1, 2030
32	Betty Boop's Little Pal	Myron Waldman, Edward Nolan	21 September	BBEC Volume 2	Copyright renewed; will enter the public domain on January 1, 2030
33	Betty Boop's Prize Show	Myron Waldman, Lillian Friedman	19 October	BBEC Volume 2	Copyright renewed; will enter the public domain on January 1, 2030
34	Keep in Style	Myron Waldman, Edward Nolan	16 November	BBEC Volume 2	Copyright renewed; will enter the public domain on January 1, 2030
35	When My Ship Comes In	Myron Waldman, Hicks Lokey	21 December	BBEC Volume 4	Copyright renewed; will enter the public domain on January 1, 2030
=== 1935 ===
No.	Film	Animated by	Original release date	Availability	Notes
36	Baby Be Good	Myron Waldman, Edward Nolan	18 January	Public Domain	Copyright not renewed; entered the public domain in 1963
37	Taking the Blame	Myron Waldman, Hicks Lokey	15 February	Public Domain	Copyright not renewed; entered the public domain in 1963
38	Stop That Noise	Myron Waldman, Edward Nolan	15 March	BBEC Volume 3 (Public Domain)	Copyright not renewed; entered the public domain in 1963
39	Swat the Fly	David Tendlar, Sam Stimson	19 April	Public Domain	Copyright not renewed; entered the public domain in 1963
40	No! No! A Thousand Times No!!	Myron Waldman, Edward Nolan	24 May	TOBBC Volume 1 (Public Domain)	Copyright not renewed; entered the public domain in 1963
41	A Little Soap and Water	Myron Waldman, Edward Nolan	21 June	Public Domain	Copyright not renewed; entered the public domain in 1963
42	A Language All My Own	Myron Waldman, Hicks Lokey	19 July	Fleischer Cartoons: Greatest Hits, Volume 1 (Public Domain)	Copyright not renewed; entered the public domain in 1963
43	Betty Boop and Grampy	David Tendlar, Charles Hastings	16 August	Fleischer Cartoons: Greatest Hits, Volume 1 (Public Domain)	Copyright not renewed; entered the public domain in 1963
44	Judge for a Day	Myron Waldman, Hicks Lokey	20 September	Public Domain	Copyright not renewed; entered the public domain in 1963
45	Making Stars	Myron Waldman, Edward Nolan	18 October	Public Domain	Copyright not renewed; entered the public domain in 1963
46	Betty Boop with Henry, the Funniest Living American	Myron Waldman, Sam Stimson	22 November	TOBBC Volume 1 (Public Domain)	Copyright not renewed; entered the public domain in 1963
47	Little Nobody	Myron Waldman, Hicks Lokey	27 December	Public Domain	Copyright not renewed; entered the public domain in 1963
=== 1936 ===
No.	Film	Animated by	Original release date	Availability	Notes
48	Betty Boop and the Little King	Myron Waldman, Hicks Lokey	31 January	TOBBC Volume 1 (Public Domain)	Copyright not renewed; entered the public domain in 1964
49	Not Now	Myron Waldman, Hicks Lokey	28 February	Public Domain	Copyright not renewed; entered the public domain in 1964
50	Betty Boop and Little Jimmy	Myron Waldman, Hicks Lokey	27 March	TOBBC Volume 1 (Public Domain)	Copyright not renewed; entered the public domain in 1964
51	We Did It	Willard Bowsky, George Germanetti	24 April	Public Domain	Copyright not renewed; entered the public domain in 1964
52	A Song a Day	David Tendlar, Nicholas Tafuri	22 May	Public Domain	Copyright not renewed; entered the public domain in 1964
53	More Pep	Thomas Johnson, Dave Hoffman	19 June	Public Domain	Copyright not renewed; entered the public domain in 1964
54	You're Not Built That Way	Myron Waldman, Hicks Lokey	17 July	Public Domain	Copyright not renewed; entered the public domain in 1964
55	Happy You and Merry Me	Willard Bowsky, George Germanetti	21 August	TOBBC Volume 1 (Public Domain)	Copyright not renewed; entered the public domain in 1964
56	Training Pigeons	Myron Waldman, Edward Nolan	18 September	Public Domain	Copyright not renewed; entered the public domain in 1964
57	Grampy's Indoor Outing	David Tendlar, William Sturm	16 October	TOBBC Volume 1 (Public Domain)	Copyright not renewed; entered the public domain in 1964
58	Be Human	Myron Waldman, Lillian Friedman	20 November	TOBBC Volume 1 (Public Domain)	Copyright not renewed; entered the public domain in 1964
59	Making Friends	Myron Waldman, Hicks Lokey	18 December	Public Domain	Copyright not renewed; entered the public domain in 1964
=== 1937 ===
No.	Film	Animated by	Original release date	Availability	Notes
60	House Cleaning Blues	David Tendlar, Eli Brucker	15 January	TOBBC Volume 1 (Public Domain)	Copyright not renewed; entered the public domain in 1965
61	Whoops! I'm a Cowboy	Tom Johnson, David Hoffman	12 February	Public Domain	Copyright not renewed; entered the public domain in 1965
62	The Hot Air Salesman	Thomas Johnson, David Hoffman	12 March	Public Domain	Copyright not renewed; entered the public domain in 1965
63	Pudgy Takes a Bow-Wow	Myron Waldman, Lillian Friedman	9 April	Public Domain	Copyright not renewed; entered the public domain in 1965
64	Pudgy Picks a Fight!	Myron Waldman, Hicks Lokey	14 May	TOBBC Volume 1 (Public Domain)	Copyright not renewed; entered the public domain in 1965
65	The Impractical Joker	Thomas Johnson, Frank Endres	18 June	Public Domain	Copyright not renewed; entered the public domain in 1965
66	Ding Dong Doggie	Thomas Johnson, Frank Endres	23 July	TOBBC Volume 1 (Public Domain)	Copyright not renewed; entered the public domain in 1965
67	The Candid Candidate	Myron Waldman, Lillian Friedman	27 August	Public Domain	Copyright not renewed; entered the public domain in 1965
68	Service with a Smile	David Tendlar, William Sturm	23 September	BBEC Volume 3	Copyright renewed; will enter the public domain on January 1, 2033
69	The New Deal Show	Myron Waldman, Hicks Lokey	22 October	BBEC Volume 3	Copyright renewed; will enter the public domain on January 1, 2033
70	The Foxy Hunter	Thomas Johnson, Harold Walker	26 November	BBEC Volume 1	Copyright renewed; will enter the public domain on January 1, 2033
71	Zula Hula	Tom Johnson, Frank Endres	24 December	BBEC Volume 4	Copyright renewed; will enter the public domain on January 1, 2033
=== 1938 ===
No.	Film	Animated by	Original release date	Availability	Notes
72	Riding the Rails	Myron Waldman, Hicks Lokey	28 January	BBEC Volume 4	Copyright renewed; will enter the public domain on January 1, 2034
73	Be Up to Date	Thomas Johnson, Harold Walker	25 February	BBEC Volume 3	Copyright renewed; will enter the public domain on January 1, 2034
74	Honest Love and True	Myron Waldman, Lillian Friedman	25 March	TOBBC Volume 1 (Public Domain)	Copyright not renewed; entered the public domain in 1966
75	Out of the Inkwell	Tom Johnson, Otto Feuer	22 April	BBEC Volume 3	Copyright renewed; will enter the public domain on January 1, 2034
76	The Swing School	Tom Johnson, Frank Endres	27 May	BBEC Volume 4	Copyright renewed; will enter the public domain on January 1, 2034
77	Pudgy and the Lost Kitten	Myron Waldman, Lillian Friedman	24 June	Public Domain	Copyright not renewed; entered the public domain in 1966
78	Buzzy Boop	David Tendlar, William Sturm	29 July	Public Domain	Copyright not renewed; entered the public domain in 1966
79	Pudgy the Watchman	Tom Johnson, Harold Walker	12 August	BBEC Volume 4	Copyright renewed; will enter the public domain on January 1, 2034
80	Buzzy Boop at the Concert	Tom Johnson, Harold Walker	16 September	UCLA (Public Domain)	Copyright not renewed; entered the public domain in 1966
81	Sally Swing	Willard Bowsky, Gordon A. Sheehan	14 October	BBEC Volume 4	Copyright renewed; will enter the public domain on January 1, 2034
82	On with the New	Thomas Johnson, Frank Endres	2 December	Public Domain	Copyright not renewed; entered the public domain in 1966
83	Thrills and Chills	Roland Crandall	23 December	BBEC Volume 3	Copyright renewed; will enter the public domain on January 1, 2034
=== 1939 ===
No.	Film	Animated by	Original release date	Availability	Notes
84	My Friend the Monkey	Thomas Johnson, Frank Endres	28 January	Public Domain	Copyright not renewed; entered the public domain in 1967
85	So Does an Automobile	Roland Crandall, Frank Kelling	31 March	Public Domain	Copyright not renewed; entered the public domain in 1967
86	Musical Mountaineers	Tom Johnson, Harold Walker	12 May	TOBBC Volume 1 (Public Domain)	Copyright not renewed; entered the public domain in 1967
87	The Scared Crows	David Tendlar, William Sturm	9 June	Public Domain	Copyright not renewed; entered the public domain in 1967
88	Rhythm on the Reservation	Myron Waldman, Graham Place	7 July	TOBBC Volume 1 (Public Domain)	Betty Boop's final theatrical appearance.; Copyright not renewed; entered the public domain in 1967
89	Yip Yip Yippy	Roland Crandall, Robert Bemiller	11 August	Public Domain	Despite being billed as a "Betty Boop Cartoon", the short is a one-shot.; Copyright not renewed; entered the public domain in 1967

== Television films ==
Name	Date
The Romance of Betty Boop	March 20, 1985
The Betty Boop Movie Mystery	June 25, 1989

== Other appearances ==
- The Betty Boop Scandals of 1974 (1974) - A feature-length compilation of Betty Boop and other Fleischer shorts
- Hurray for Betty Boop aka Betty Boop for President (1980) - A feature-length compilation made up of colorized Betty Boop shorts
- Who Framed Roger Rabbit (1988) - Betty Boop made an appearance in this film.
- Back to the Inkwell (1992) - Officially used with permission from Fleischer Studios. Notable for being the only appearance of Betty in the 1990s. Directed by Ronald Bijlsma.
- Betty Boop's Double Shift (2007) - A video game for the Nintendo DS
