= List of animated films in the public domain in the United States =

The following is a list of animated films in the public domain in the United States for which there is a source to verify its status as public domain under the terms of U.S. copyright law. For more information, see List of films in the public domain in the United States. Films published before 1931 are not included because all such films are in the public domain (Note: while the film in and of itself may be in the public domain, the original versions may incorporate elements that remain under a separate copyright).

Some shorts listed here, such as the Private Snafu series, were produced for the United States government. Because they were produced for the U.S. government, they automatically fall into the public domain.

== Warner Bros. Pictures ==
Every short from 1930 has entered the public domain as of 2026.

Source: Film Superlist: Motion Pictures in the U.S. Public Domain

=== Looney Tunes ===
All black-and-white films were owned by Warner Bros. subsidiary Sunset Productions, while all color films were owned by United Artists through Associated Artists Productions.

1. Ups 'n Downs (1931)
2. Dumb Patrol (1931)
3. Yodeling Yokels (1931)
4. Bosko's Holiday (1931)
5. The Tree's Knees (1931)
6. Bosko Shipwrecked! (1931)
7. Bosko the Doughboy (1931)
8. Bosko's Soda Fountain (1931)
9. Bosko's Fox Hunt (1931)
10. Bosko at the Zoo (1932)
11. Battling Bosko (1932)
12. Big-Hearted Bosko (1932)
13. Bosko's Party (1932)
14. Bosko and Bruno (1932)
15. Bosko's Dog Race (1932)
16. Bosko at the Beach (1932)
17. Bosko and Honey (1932)
18. Bosko's Store (1932)
19. Bosko the Lumberjack (1932)
20. Hollywood Capers (1935)
21. Boom Boom (1936)
22. Westward Whoa (1936)
23. Porky's Railroad (1937)
24. Get Rich Quick Porky (1937)
25. Porky's Garden (1937)
26. Ali-Baba Bound (1940)
27. The Timid Toreador (1940)
28. The Haunted Mouse (1941)
29. Joe Glow, the Firefly (1941)
30. Porky's Bear Facts (1941)
31. Porky's Preview (1941)
32. Porky's Ant (1941)
33. A Coy Decoy (1941)
34. Porky's Prize Pony (1941)
35. Meet John Doughboy (1941)
36. We, the Animals – Squeak! (1941)
37. The Henpecked Duck (1941)
38. Notes to You (1941)
39. Robinson Crusoe, Jr. (1941)
40. Porky's Midnight Matinee (1941)
41. Porky's Pooch (1941)
42. Porky's Pastry Pirates (1942)
43. Who's Who in the Zoo (1942)
44. Porky's Cafe (1942)
45. Saps in Chaps (1942)
46. Daffy's Southern Exposure (1942)
47. Nutty News (1942)
48. Hobby Horse-Laffs (1942)
49. Gopher Goofy (1942)
50. Wacky Blackout (1942)
51. The Ducktators (1942)
52. Eatin' on the Cuff (1942)
53. The Impatient Patient (1942)
54. The Daffy Duckaroo (1942)
55. Confusions of a Nutzy Spy (1943)
56. To Duck.... or Not to Duck (1943)
57. Hop and Go (1943)
58. Tokio Jokio (1943)
59. Yankee Doodle Daffy (1943)
60. Porky Pig's Feat (1943)
61. Scrap Happy Daffy (1943)
62. Daffy – The Commando (1943)
63. Puss n' Booty (1943)

=== Merrie Melodies ===
All films were owned by United Artists through Associated Artists Productions, except for Lady, Play Your Mandolin!, which was retained by Sunset Productions.

1. Lady, Play Your Mandolin! (1931)
2. Smile, Darn Ya, Smile! (1931)
3. One More Time (1931)
4. You Don't Know What You're Doin'! (1931)
5. Hittin' the Trail for Hallelujah Land (1931)
6. Red-Headed Baby (1931)
7. Pagan Moon (1932)
8. Freddy the Freshman (1932)
9. Crosby, Columbo, and Vallee (1932)
10. Goopy Geer (1932)
11. It's Got Me Again! (1932)
12. Moonlight for Two (1932)
13. The Queen Was in the Parlor (1932)
14. I Love a Parade (1932)
15. You're Too Careless with Your Kisses! (1932)
16. I Wish I Had Wings (1932)
17. A Great Big Bunch of You (1932)
18. Three's a Crowd (1932)
19. The Shanty Where Santy Claus Lives (1932)
20. I Wanna Be a Sailor (1937)
21. Jungle Jitters (1938)
22. Have You Got Any Castles? (1938)
23. Hamateur Night (1939)
24. Robin Hood Makes Good (1939)
25. Gold Rush Daze (1939)
26. A Day at the Zoo (1939)
27. Prest-O Change-O (1939)
28. Bars and Stripes Forever (1939)
29. Daffy Duck and the Dinosaur (1939)
30. The Early Worm Gets the Bird (1940)
31. Farm Frolics (1941)
32. Sport Chumpions (1941)
33. All This and Rabbit Stew (1941)
34. Rookie Revue (1941)
35. The Wabbit Who Came to Supper (1942)
36. The Wacky Wabbit (1942)
37. Foney Fables (1942)
38. Fresh Hare (1942)
39. Fox Pop (1942)
40. The Dover Boys at Pimento University (1942)
41. The Sheepish Wolf (1942)
42. A Tale of Two Kitties (1942)
43. Ding Dog Daddy (1942)
44. Case of the Missing Hare (1942)
45. Pigs in a Polka (1943)
46. The Fifth-Column Mouse (1943)
47. Flop Goes the Weasel (1943) (Note: Original film only, Blue Ribbon reissue is copyrighted and renewed.)
48. Wackiki Wabbit (1943)
49. A Corny Concerto (1943)
50. Fin 'n' Catty (1943) (Note: Original film only, Blue Ribbon reissue is copyrighted and renewed.)
51. Falling Hare (1943)
52. Inki and the Minah Bird (1943)
53. An Itch in Time (1943) (Note: Original film only, Blue Ribbon reissue is copyrighted and renewed.)

=== Government films ===
Private Snafu films are not listed as they are produced directly by the US Government.

- Bugs Bunny (1942)
- Point Rationing of Foods (1943)
- Diving Bomb Crashes (1945)
- So Much for So Little (1949)
- A Hitch in Time (1955)
- 90 Day Wondering (1956)
- Drafty, Isn't It? (1957)

== Metro-Goldwyn-Mayer ==
The films listed below were last owned by Metro-Goldwyn-Mayer when the time for their renewals came up, except for Funny Face, which was owned by Exclusive Pictures Corporation, at the time the rights owner for all Flip the Frog films.

1. Funny Face (1932)
2. To Spring (1936)
3. Jerky Turkey (1945)
4. Doggone Tired (1949)

== Universal Pictures ==
The films listed below were produced by Walter Lantz Productions. They were last owned by Universal City Studios when the time for their renewals came up. Boy Meets Dog! (1938) was originally released to the home movie market by Castle Films, which became a subsidiary of Universal Pictures in 1947.

1. House of Magic (1937)
2. Boy Meets Dog! (1938)
3. Silly Superstition (1939)
4. Scrub Me Mama with a Boogie Beat (1941)
5. Pantry Panic (1941)

=== Oswald the Lucky Rabbit ===
All films produced by Winkler Pictures as well as films produced in 1930 are in the public domain.

1. The Bandmaster (1931)
2. Mechanical Man (1932)
3. Making Good (1932)
4. The Plumber (1933)
5. The Quail Hunt (1935)

== Paramount Pictures ==
Every short from 1930 and before has entered the public domain as of 2026.

=== Fleischer Studios ===
All films were owned by National Telefilm Associates, except for Honest Love and True, Pudgy and the Lost Kitten, Buzzy Boop and Buzzy Boop at the Concert (all from 1938), remaining with Paramount Pictures without having their copyright renewed.

==== Betty Boop ====
1. Betty Boop's Ker-Choo (1933)
2. Betty Boop's Crazy Inventions (1933)
3. Is My Palm Read (1933)
4. Betty in Blunderland (1934)
5. Betty Boop's Rise to Fame (1934)
6. Baby Be Good (1935)
7. Taking the Blame (1935)
8. Stop That Noise (1935)
9. Swat the Fly (1935)
10. No! No! A Thousand Times No!! (1935)
11. A Little Soap and Water (1935)
12. A Language All My Own (1935)
13. Betty Boop and Grampy (1935)
14. Judge for a Day (1935)
15. Making Stars (1935)
16. Betty Boop with Henry, the Funniest Living American (1935)
17. Little Nobody (1935)
18. Betty Boop and the Little King (1936)
19. Not Now (1936)
20. Betty Boop and Little Jimmy (1936)
21. We Did It (1936)
22. A Song a Day (1936)
23. More Pep (1936)
24. You're Not Built That Way (1936)
25. Happy You and Merry Me (1936)
26. Training Pigeons (1936)
27. Grampy's Indoor Outing (1936)
28. Be Human (1936)
29. Making Friends (1936)
30. House Cleaning Blues (1937)
31. Whoops! I'm a Cowboy (1937)
32. The Hot Air Salesman (1937)
33. Pudgy Takes a Bow-Wow (1937)
34. Pudgy Picks a Fight! (1937)
35. The Impractical Joker (1937)
36. Ding Dong Doggie (1937)
37. The Candid Candidate (1937)
38. Honest Love and True (1938)
39. Pudgy and the Lost Kitten (1938)
40. Buzzy Boop (1938)
41. Buzzy Boop at the Concert (1938)
42. On with the New (1938)
43. My Friend the Monkey (1939)
44. So Does an Automobile (1939)
45. Musical Mountaineers (1939)
46. The Scared Crows (1939)
47. Rhythm on the Reservation (1939)

==== Color Classics ====
1. Poor Cinderella (1934)
2. Little Dutch Mill (1934)
3. An Elephant Never Forgets (1935)
4. The Song of the Birds (1935)
5. The Kids in the Shoe (1935)
6. Dancing on the Moon (1935)
7. Time for Love (1935)
8. Somewhere in Dreamland (1936)
9. The Little Stranger (1936)
10. The Cobweb Hotel (1936)
11. Greedy Humpty Dumpty (1936)
12. Hawaiian Birds (1936)
13. Play Safe (1936)
14. Christmas Comes But Once a Year (1936)
15. Bunny Mooning (1937)
16. Chicken a La King (1937)
17. A Car-Tune Portrait (1937)
18. Peeping Penguins (1937)
19. Educated Fish (1937)
20. Little Lamby (1937)
21. Hold It! (1938)
22. Hunky and Spunky (1938)
23. All's Fair at the Fair (1938)
24. The Playful Polar Bears (1938)
25. Always Kickin' (1939)
26. Small Fry (1939)
27. The Barnyard Brat (1939)
28. The Fresh Vegetable Mystery (1939)
29. Little Lambkins (1940)
30. Ants in the Plants (1940)
31. A Kick in Time (1940)
32. Snubbed by a Snob (1940)
33. You Can't Shoe a Horse Fly (1940)

==== Gabby ====
1. King for a Day (1940)
2. All's Well (1941)
3. Two for the Zoo (1941)
4. Swing Cleaning (1941)
5. Fire Cheese (1941)
6. Gabby Goes Fishing (1941)
7. It's a Hap-Hap-Happy Day (1941)

==== Screen Songs ====
1. Somebody Stole My Gal (1931)
2. Dinah (1933)
3. Ain't She Sweet? (1933)
4. Reaching for the Moon (1933)
5. Lazy Bones (1934)
6. I Wished on the Moon (1935)
7. It's Easy to Remember (1935)
8. No Other One (1936)
9. I Feel Like a Feather in the Breeze (1936)
10. I Don't Want to Make History (1936)
11. I Can't Escape from You (1936)
12. Talking Through My Heart (1936)
13. Never Should Have Told You (1937)
14. Twilight on the Trail (1937)
15. You Came to My Rescue (1937)

==== Feature films ====
- Gulliver's Travels (1939)

==== Miscellaneous ====
- In My Merry Oldsmobile (1931)
- Let's Sing with Popeye (1934)

=== Famous Studios ===
==== Casper the Friendly Ghost ====
All films were owned by The Harvey Entertainment Company.

1. Boo Moon (1954)
2. Spooking About Africa (1957)

==== Little Lulu ====
All films were owned by National Telefilm Associates.

1. Bargain Counter Attack (1946)
2. Bored of Education (1946)
3. Chick and Double Chick (1946)
4. Musica-Lulu (1947)
5. A Scout with the Gout (1947)
6. Loose in the Caboose (1947)
7. Cad and Caddy (1947)
8. A Bout with a Trout (1947)
9. The Dog Show-Off (1948)

==== Noveltoons ====
All films released before The Voice of the Turkey (1950) were owned by National Telefilm Associates, except for Spree for All (1946) and Cat O' Nine Ails (1948), remaining with Paramount Pictures without having their copyright renewed. Almost all Noveltoons before 1950 were not renewed and are in the public domain, except for Cilly Goose and Gabriel Churchkitten (both 1944).

1. No Mutton fer Nuttin' (1943)
2. The Henpecked Rooster (1944)
3. Suddenly It's Spring (1944)
4. When G.I. Johnny Comes Home (1945)
5. A Lamb in a Jam (1945)
6. A Self-Made Mongrel (1945)
7. The Friendly Ghost (1945)
8. Old MacDonald Had a Farm (1945)
9. Cheese Burglar (1946)
10. Sheep Shape (1946)
11. The Goal Rush (1946)
12. Spree for All (1946)
13. Sudden Fried Chicken (1946)
14. The Stupidstitious Cat (1947)
15. The Enchanted Square (1947)
16. Madhattan Island (1947)
17. Much Ado About Mutton (1947)
18. The Wee Men (1947)
19. The Mild West (1947)
20. Naughty but Mice (1947)
21. Santa's Surprise (1947)
22. Cat O' Nine Ails (1948)
23. Flip Flap (1948)
24. The Bored Cuckoo (1948)
25. There's Good Boos To-Night (1948)
26. Butterscotch and Soda (1948)
27. The Mite Makes Right (1948)
28. Hector’s Hectic Life (1948)
29. Hep Cat Symphony (1949)
30. The Lost Dream (1949)
31. A Haunting We Will Go (1949)
32. A Mutt in a Rut (1949)
33. Campus Capers (1949)
34. Leprechaun's Gold (1949)
35. Song of the Birds (1949)
36. Quack-a-Doodle-Doo (1950)
37. Teacher's Pest (1950)
38. Tarts and Flowers (1950)
39. Pleased to Eat You (1950)
40. Goofy Goofy Gander (1950)
41. The Seapreme Court (1954)
42. Crazytown (1954)
43. Pest Pupil (1957)

==== Screen Songs ====
All films were owned by National Telefilm Associates, except for Readin', 'Ritin' and Rhythmetic (1948), remaining with Paramount Pictures without having its copyright renewed.

1. Base Brawl (1948)
2. Little Brown Jug (1948)
3. The Golden State (1948)
4. Winter Draws On (1948)
5. Sing or Swim (1948)
6. Camptown Races (1948)
7. The Lone Star State (1948)
8. Readin', 'Ritin' and Rhythmetic (1948)
9. The Funshine State (1949)
10. The Emerald Isle (1949)
11. Comin' Round the Mountain (1949)
12. The Stork Market (1949)
13. Spring Song (1949)
14. The Ski's the Limit (1949)
15. Toys Will Be Toys (1949)
16. Farm Foolery (1949)
17. Our Funny Finny Friends (1949)
18. Marriage Wows (1949)
19. The Big Flame Up (1949)
20. Strolling Thru the Park (1949)
21. The Big Drip (1949)
22. Snow Foolin' (1949)
23. Short'nin' Bread (1950)
24. Win, Place and Show Boat (1950)
25. Jingle Jangle Jungle (1950)
26. Gobs of Fun (1950)
27. Helter Swelter (1950)

==== Kartunes ====
This film was owned by The Harvey Entertainment Company.

1. Hysterical History (1953)

==== Modern Madcaps ====
This film was owned by The Harvey Entertainment Company, but its copyright renewal was invalidated due to being submitted after its expiration.

1. From Dime to Dime (1960)

=== Popeye the Sailor ===
All films were owned by United Artists through Associated Artists Productions, as well as King Features Syndicate. King's derivative work interest in the film series ended with the expiration of the copyright on the Popeye character in 2025.

1. Little Swee'Pea (1936)
2. Popeye the Sailor Meets Sindbad the Sailor (1936)
3. I'm in the Army Now (1936)
4. The Paneless Window Washer (1937)
5. I Never Changes My Altitude (1937)
6. Popeye the Sailor Meets Ali Baba's Forty Thieves (1937)
7. A Date to Skate (1938)
8. Customers Wanted (1939)
9. Aladdin and His Wonderful Lamp (1939)
10. Me Musical Nephews (1942)
11. Shuteye Popeye (1952)
12. Big Bad Sindbad (1952)
13. Ancient Fistory (1953)
14. Floor Flusher (1954)
15. Popeye's 20th Anniversary (1954)
16. Taxi-Turvy (1954)
17. Bride and Gloom (1954)
18. Greek Mirthology (1954)
19. Fright to the Finish (1954)
20. Private Eye Popeye (1954)
21. Gopher Spinach (1954)
22. Cookin' with Gags (1955)
23. Popeye for President (1956)
24. Out to Punch (1956)
25. Assault and Flattery (1956)
26. Insect to Injury (1956)
27. Parlez Vous Woo (1956)
28. I Don't Scare (1956)
29. A Haul in One (1956)
30. Nearlyweds (1957)
31. The Crystal Brawl (1957)
32. Patriotic Popeye (1957)
33. Spree Lunch (1957)
34. Spooky Swabs (1957)

=== Superman ===
All films were owned by National Periodical Publications.

1. Superman (1941)
1. The Mechanical Monsters (1941)
2. The Arctic Giant (1942)
3. Billion Dollar Limited (1942)
4. The Bulleteers (1942)
5. Destruction, Inc. (1942)
6. Electric Earthquake (1942)
7. Eleventh Hour (1942)
8. Japoteurs (1942)
9. The Magnetic Telescope (1942)
10. Showdown (1942)
11. Terror on the Midway (1942)
12. Volcano (1942)
13. Jungle Drums (1943)
14. The Mummy Strikes (1943)
15. Secret Agent (1943)
16. The Underground World (1943)

=== George Pal Productions ===
==== Puppetoons ====
All films were owned by National Telefilm Associates.

1. Hoola Boola (1941)
2. Mr. Strauss Takes a Walk (1942)
3. Tulips Shall Grow (1942)
4. Jasper and the Haunted House (1942)
5. The Little Broadcast (1943)
6. Olio for Jasper (1946)
7. Together in the Weather (1946)
8. John Henry and the Inky-Poo (1946)
9. Jasper’s Derby (1946)
10. Jasper in a Jam (1946)
11. Shoe Shine Jasper (1947)
12. Wilbur the Lion (1947)
13. Tubby the Tuba (1947)
14. Date with Duke (1947)
15. Rhapsody in Wood (1947)

== Celebrity Productions, Inc. ==
=== ComiColor Cartoons ===
1. The Valiant Tailor (1934)
2. Jack Frost (1934)
3. Little Black Sambo (1935)
4. The Bremen Town Musicians (1935)
5. Old Mother Hubbard (1935)
6. Mary's Little Lamb (1935)
7. Summertime (1935)
8. Sinbad the Sailor (1935)
9. The Three Bears (1935)
10. Balloon Land (1935)
11. Simple Simon (1935)
12. Humpty Dumpty (1935)
13. Ali Baba (1936)
14. Tom Thumb (1936)
15. Dick Whittington's Cat (1936)
16. Little Boy Blue (1936)
17. Happy Days (1936)

== The Van Beuren Corporation ==
=== Rainbow Parade ===
1. The Sunshine Makers (1935)
2. Parrotville Old Folks (1935)
3. Spinning Mice (1935)
4. Picnic Panic (1935)
5. The Merry Kittens (1935)
6. Parrotville Post-Office (1935)
7. The Hunting Season (1935)
8. Scotty Finds a Home (1935)
9. Molly Moo-Cow and the Butterflies (1935)
10. Molly Moo-Cow and the Indians (1935)
11. Molly Moo-Cow and Rip Van Wrinkle (1935)
12. Toonerville Trolley (1936)
13. The Goose That Laid the Golden Egg (1936)
14. Molly Moo-Cow and Robinson Crusoe (1936)
15. Neptune Nonsense (1936)
16. Bold King Cole (1936)
17. A Waif's Welcome (1936)
18. Trolley Ahoy (1936)
19. Cupid Gets His Man (1936)
20. It's a Greek Life (1936)
21. Toonerville Picnic (1936)

=== The Little King ===
1. The Fatal Note (1933)
2. Marching Along (1933)
3. On the Pan (1933)
4. Pals (1933)
5. Jest of Honor (1934)
6. Jolly Good Felons (1934)
7. Sultan Pepper (1934)
8. A Royal Good Time (1934)
9. Art For Art’s Sake (1934)
10. Cactus King (1934)

=== Tom and Jerry ===
1. Wot a Night (1931)
2. A Swiss Trick (1931)
3. Rocketeers (1932)
4. In the Bag (1932)
5. Joint Wipers (1932)
6. Pots and Pans (1932)
7. The Tuba Tooter (1932)
8. Plane Dumb (1932)
9. Redskin Blues (1932)
10. Jolly Fish (1932)
11. Barnyard Bunk (1932)
12. A Spanish Twist (1932)
13. Piano Tooners (1932)
14. Pencil Mania (1932)
15. Magic Mummy (1933)
16. Happy Hoboes (1933)
17. Hook and Ladder Hokum (1933)

== Ted Eshbaugh Studios ==
1. Goofy Goat (1931)
2. The Snowman (1933)
3. The Wizard of Oz (1933)

== Walt Disney Productions ==
Every short from 1930 and before has entered the public domain as of 2026.

The films listed below were last owned by Walt Disney Productions when the time for their renewals came up.

1. The Mad Doctor (1933)
2. The Cookie Carnival (1935)
3. Susie the Little Blue Coupe (1952) (Note: Visuals only, music is copyrighted and renewed.)
4. Hooked Bear (1956)

=== Government films ===
The Thrifty Pig and 7 Wise Dwarfs (both 1941) were produced for The National Film Board of Canada.

- The Thrifty Pig (1941)
- 7 Wise Dwarfs (1941)
- The Grain That Built a Hemisphere (1943)
- The Spirit of '43 (1943)

== Terrytoons ==
Every Terrytoons short from 1930 has entered the public domain as of 2026.

Two cartoons were distributed by Educational Pictures while two were distributed by 20th Century Fox. The films listed below were last owned by Viacom when the time for their renewals came up, except for Noah's Outing and Robinson Crusoe, which were owned by CBS Films.

1. Noah's Outing (1932)
2. Robinson Crusoe (1933)
3. Wolf! Wolf! (1944)
4. The Talking Magpies (1946)

== Columbia Pictures ==
All Mickey Mouse and Silly Symphony films released by Columbia were retained by Walt Disney Productions and were otherwise renewed. All Screen Gems and United Productions of America films were owned by Columbia Pictures, with the exception of the Oswald the Lucky Rabbit and 1927-1929 Krazy Kat films, respectively owned by Universal Pictures and Paramount Pictures. All films produced in or before 1930 are in the public domain.

=== Color Rhapsody ===
1. Snow Time (1938)
2. Little Moth’s Big Flame (1938)
3. The Disillusioned Bluebird (1944)
4. Fiesta Time (1945)
5. Rippling Romance (1945)
6. Hot Foot Lights (1945)
7. Carnival Courage (1945)

=== The Fox and the Crow ===
1. The Magic Fluke (1949)

=== Toby the Pup ===
1. Circus Time (1931)
2. The Milkman (1931)
3. The Brown Derby (1931)
4. Down South (1931)
5. Hallowe'en (1931)
6. Aces Up (1931)
7. The Bull Thrower (1931)

== U.S. Government films ==
The films listed below are works of the United States government, which makes them public domain.

Source: Film Superlist: Motion Pictures in the U.S. Public Domain

=== Private Snafu ===
Produced between 1943 and 1945.

1. Booby Traps
2. Censored
3. The Chow Hound
4. Coming! Snafu!
5. Fighting Tools
6. Gas
7. Going Home
8. Gripes
9. The Home Front
10. Hot Spot
11. In the Aleutians – Isles of Enchantment
12. The Infantry Blues
13. The Goldbrick
14. It's Murder She Says
15. A Lecture on Camouflage
16. Private Snafu vs. Malaria Mike
17. Rumors
18. Secrets of the Caribbean
19. Snafuperman
20. Spies
21. Target: Snafu
22. Three Brothers
23. Operation: Snafu
24. Outpost
25. Pay Day
26. No Buddy Atoll

=== Mr. Hook ===
Produced between 1943 and 1945.

1. Take Heed Mr. Tojo (1943)
2. The Return of Mr. Hook (1945)
3. The Good Egg (1945)
4. Tokyo Woes (1945)

=== Other government films ===
- All 1943–1944 Fred Brunish stop-motion instructional films for the U.S. Navy

== Miscellaneous ==
- All U.S.-based productions made before 1931, including much of the Felix the Cat, Out of the Inkwell, Krazy Kat, Aesop's Fables, Winsor McCay and Laugh-O-Gram Studio libraries.
