= 1938 in animation =

Events in 1938 in animation.

== Events ==
=== January ===
- January 1: Tex Avery's Daffy Duck & Egghead, starring Daffy Duck and produced by Leon Schlesinger Productions, is first released. Daffy's name was revealed in this short.
- January 28: Riding the Rails, starring Betty Boop and produced by Fleischer Studios, is first released.

=== February ===
- February 7: Bob Clampett's Breakdowns of 1938 is made, produced by Leon Schlesinger Productions, an blooper reel made exclusively for Warner Brothers' personnel and not released theatrically. The film is notable for a scene where Porky Pig says "Son of a bitch!".
- February 11: Jack King's Self Control, starring Donald Duck and produced by Walt Disney Animation Studios, is first released.
- February 19:
  - Friz Freleng's Jungle Jitters, produced by Leon Schlesinger Productions, is first released. This short later became part of the Censored Eleven.
  - The Captain and the Kids film series, produced by the Metro-Goldwyn-Mayer cartoon studio, debuts with their first cartoon Cleaning House.
- February 25:
  - Be Up to Date, starring Betty Boop and produced by Fleischer Studios, is first released.
  - Ben Sharpsteen's Boat Builders, starring Mickey Mouse, Donald Duck and Goofy and produced by Walt Disney Animation Studios, is first released.
- February 26: Bob Clampett's What Price Porky starring Porky Pig and produced by Leon Schlesinger Productions, is first released.

=== March ===
- March 10: Jack King's Donald's Better Self, starring Donald Duck and produced by Walt Disney Animation Studios, is first released.
  - 10th Academy Awards:
    - Walt Disney's The Old Mill wins the Academy Award for Best Animated Short Film.
    - Walt Disney's Snow White and the Seven Dwarfs is nominated for the Academy Award for Best Original Score, but loses to One Hundred Men and a Girl. However, a year later the Academy will give Snow White eight special Academy Awards.
- March 12: Tex Avery's The Sneezing Weasel, produced by Leon Schlesinger Productions, is first released.
- March 25: Honest Love and True, starring Betty Boop and produced by Fleischer Studios, is first released.

=== April ===
- April 1: Burt Gillett's Moth and the Flame, produced by Walt Disney Animation Studios, is first released.
- April 15: Jack King's Donald's Nephews, produced by Walt Disney Animation Studios, is first released. It marks the on-screen debut of Huey, Louie and Dewey who had already debuted in Al Taliaferro's Donald Duck comic strip a year earlier.
- April 16: Bob Clampett's Porky's Five & Ten, starring Porky Pig and produced by Leon Schlesinger Productions, is first released.
- April 22: Out of the Inkwell, starring Betty Boop and produced by Fleischer Studios, is first released.
- April 23: Tex Avery's The Penguin Parade, produced by Leon Schlesinger Productions, is first released.
- April 30: Ben Hardaway and Cal Dalton's Porky's Hare Hunt, starring Porky Pig and produced by Leon Schlesinger Productions, is first released. In it, Porky hunts a rabbit, who is a prototypical version of Bugs Bunny.

=== May ===
- May 6: Ben Sharpsteen's Mickey's Trailer, starring Mickey Mouse, Donald Duck and Goofy and produced by Walt Disney Animation Studios, is first released.
- May 14: Frank Tashlin's Now That Summer is Gone, produced by Leon Schlesinger Productions, is first released.
- May 27:
  - The Swing School, starring Betty Boop, produced by Fleischer Studios, is first released.
  - Graham Heid's Wynken, Blynken and Nod, produced by Walt Disney Animation Studios, is first released.
- May 28: Tex Avery's The Isle of Pingo Pongo, starring the early version of Elmer Fudd and produced by Leon Schlesinger Productions, is first released. This short later became part of the Censored Eleven.

=== June ===
- June 11: Cal Howard and Cal Dalton's Katnip Kollege, produced by Leon Schlesinger Productions, is first released.
- June 17: Ben Sharpsteen's Polar Trappers, starring Donald Duck and Goofy and produced by Walt Disney Animation Studios, is first released.
- June 24: Pudgy and the Lost Kitten, starring Betty Boop and produced by Fleischer Studios, is first released.
- June 25:
  - Frank Tashlin's Have You Got Any Castles?, produced by Leon Schlesinger Productions, is first released.
  - Bob Clampett's Porky's Party, starring Porky Pig and produced by Leon Schlesinger Productions, is first released.

=== July ===
- July 8: Jack King's Good Scouts, starring Donald Duck, Huey, Louie and Dewey and produced by Walt Disney Animation Studios, is first released.
- July 9: Ben Hardaway and Cal Dalton's Love and Curses, produced by Leon Schlesinger Productions, is first released.
- July 23: Tex Avery's Cinderella Meets Fella, starring the early version of Elmer Fudd and produced by Leon Schlesinger Productions, is first released.
- July 25: Frank Tashlin's Porky's Spring Planting, starring Porky Pig and produced by Leon Schlesinger Productions, is first released.
- July 29:
  - Buzzy Boop, starring Betty Boop and produced by Fleischer Studios, is first released.
  - Ben Sharpsteen's The Fox Hunt, starring Donald Duck and Goofy and produced by Walt Disney Animation Studios, is first released.

=== August ===
- August 6: Bob Clampett's Porky & Daffy, starring Porky Pig and Daffy Duck and produced by Leon Schlesinger Productions, is first released.
- August 12: Pudgy the Watchman, starring Betty Boop and produced by Fleischer Studios, is first released.
- August 13: Frank Tashlin's The Major Lied 'Til Dawn, produced by Leon Schlesinger Productions, is first released.
- August 19: David Hand and Dick Huemer's The Whalers, starring Mickey Mouse, Donald Duck and Goofy and produced by Walt Disney Animation Studios, is first released.
- August 26: All's Fair at the Fair, produced by Fleischer Studios, is first released.
- August 27:
  - Cal Dalton and Cal Howard's A-Lad-In Bagdad, produced by Leon Schlesinger Productions, is first released.
  - Frank Tashlin's Wholly Smoke, starring Porky Pig, produced by Leon Schlesinger Productions, is first released.

=== September ===
- September 9: Bill Roberts' Mickey's Parrot, starring Mickey Mouse and Pluto and produced by Walt Disney Animation Studios, is first released.
- September 10: Frank Tashlin's Cracked Ice, produced by Leon Schlesinger Productions, is first released.
- September 16: Buzzy Boop at the Concert, starring Betty Boop and produced by Fleischer Studios, is first released.
- September 23: Bill Roberts' Brave Little Tailor, starring Mickey Mouse and Minnie Mouse and produced by Walt Disney Animation Studios, is first released.
- September 24:
  - Tex Avery's A Feud There Was, starring the early version of Elmer Fudd and produced by Leon Schlesinger Productions, is first released.
  - Bob Clampett's Porky in Wackyland starring Porky Pig and produced by Leon Schlesinger Productions, is first released. It marks the debut of the Do-Do Bird.

=== October ===
- October 8: Bob McKimson's Little Pancho Vanilla and produced by Leon Schlesinger Productions, is first released.
- October 14:
  - Jack Cutting's Farmyard Symphony, produced by Walt Disney Animation Studios, is first released.
  - Sally Swing, starring Betty Boop and produced by Fleischer Studios, is first released.
- October 22: Tex Avery's Johnny Smith and Poker-Huntas, starring the early version of Elmer Fudd and produced by Leon Schlesinger Productions, is first released.
- October 28: The Playful Polar Bears, produced by Fleischer Studios, is first released.

=== November ===
- November 4: Jack King and Jim Handley's Donald's Golf Game, starring Donald Duck and Huey, Dewey, & Louie and produced by Walt Disney Animation Studios, is first released.
- November 5:
  - Bob Clampett's Porky in Egypt, starring Porky Pig, produced by Leon Schlesinger Productions, is first released. The cartoon is notable for a scene where a camel goes insane due to heat stroke.
  - Frank Tashlin's You're an Education, produced by Leon Schlesinger Productions, is first released.
- November 18: A Date to Skate, starring Popeye and produced by Fleischer Studios, is first released.
- November 19: Chuck Jones' The Night Watchman, produced by Leon Schlesinger Productions, is first released.
- November 25: Dick Rickard's Ferdinand the Bull, produced by Walt Disney Animation Studios, is first released.
- November 26: Bob Clampett's The Daffy Doc, starring Daffy Duck and Porky Pig and produced by Leon Schlesinger Productions, is first released.

=== December ===
- December 2: On with the New, starring Betty Boop and produced by Fleischer Studios, is first released.
- December 9: Rudolf Ising and Vernon Stallings' Merbabies, produced by Walt Disney Animation Studios, is first released.
- December 12: Tex Avery's Daffy Duck in Hollywood, produced by Leon Schlesinger Productions, is first released. The cartoon is notable for combining animation with live-action, including a scene where Daffy meets producer Leon Schlesinger himself. This was Avery's final cartoon to feature Daffy.
- December 17: Ben Hardaway and Cal Dalton's Count Me Out (1938) starring Egghead and produced by Leon Schlesinger Productions, is first released.
- December 23:
  - Wilfred Jackson's Mother Goose Goes Hollywood, produced by Walt Disney Animation Studios, is first released. A cartoon featuring caricatures of Hollywood actors.
  - Thrills and Chills, starring Betty Boop, produced by Fleischer Studios, is first released.
- December 31: Tex Avery's The Mice Will Play, produced by Leon Schlesinger Productions, is first released.

=== Specific date unknown ===
- The manga Norakuro is adapted into an anime film, directed by Mitsuyo Seo.

== Births ==
=== January ===
- January 6: Michael Graham Cox, English actor (voice of Boromir in The Lord of the Rings, Bigwig in Watership Down), (d. 1995).
- January 7: Roland Topor, French novelist, illustrator, cartoonist, comics artist, film script writer, TV script writer, animator and playwright (Les Escargots, Fantastic Planet), (d. 1998).
- January 13: Charlie Brill, American actor and comedian (voice of Grimm in Mother Goose and Grimm, the title character in The Grim Adventures of Billy & Mandy episode "King Tooten Pooten").
- January 14: Jack Jones, American singer and actor (voice of the Frog in Over the Garden Wall), (d. 2024).
- January 16:
  - Michael Pataki, American actor (voice of The Cow in Mighty Mouse: The New Adventures, George Liquor in Ren & Stimpy, the Chief in Boo Boo Runs Wild, Sewer King in the Batman: The Animated Series episode "The Underdwellers"), (d. 2010).
  - Michael J. O'Connor, American animator, storyboard artist (Filmation, Hanna-Barbera, The Simpsons) and writer (DePatie-Freleng Enterprises, Filmation), (d. 1992).
- January 25:
  - Shotaro Ishinomori, Japanese manga artist (creator of Cyborg 009), (d. 1998).
  - Leiji Matsumoto, Japanese animator and manga artist (Space Battleship Yamato, Galaxy Express 999, Space Pirate Captain Harlock, Queen Emeraldas, Queen Millennia, worked with the band Daft Punk on their animated music videos and their full-length film Interstella 5555: The 5tory of the 5ecret 5tar 5ystem), (d. 2023).

=== February ===
- February 2: Bo Hopkins, American actor (voice of Huttin in The Angry Beavers episode "Fat Chance"), (d. 2022).
- February 3:
  - Marshall Efron, American actor (voice of Ratso in The Kwicky Koala Show, Sloppy Smurf in The Smurfs, Mooch in The Biskitts, Fat Cat in Kidd Video, Stanley in Fluppy Dogs, Hun-Gurrr in The Transformers, Deputroll Flake in Trollkins, Synonamess Botch in Twice Upon a Time, the Earl of Sandwich in the Time Squad episode "A Sandwich by Any Other Name"), (d. 2019).
  - Petar Gligorovski, Macedonian painter, comics artist, animator and director (Adam 5 do 12), (d. 1995).
- February 4: Tomoharu Katsumata, Japanese film director (Toei Animation).
- February 12: Judy Blume, American author (voiced herself in The Simpsons episode "D'oh Canada").
- February 17: Dario Penne, Italian actor (Italian dub voice of Bender in Futurama, Finn McMissile in Cars 2, Agent K in Men in Black: The Series, and Django in Ratatouille), (d. 2023).
- February 22: Barry Dennen, American actor (voice of Ramsis Dendup in Star Wars: The Clone Wars, Czar Nicholas II in the Animaniacs episode "Nothing but the Tooth", Shadow Agent in the Batman: The Animated Series episode "Off Balance"), (d. 2017).

=== March ===
- March 3: Bruno Bozzetto, Italian animator and director (creator of Mr. Rossi).
- March 12: Ken Spears, American animation writer, sound editor and producer (Hanna-Barbera, co-creator of Scooby-Doo, co-founder of Ruby-Spears), (d. 2020).
- March 16: Robert Schaefer, American background artist (Hanna-Barbera, The Nine Lives of Fritz the Cat, The Mouse and His Child, Ruby-Spears Enterprises, Heavy Metal, Marvel Productions, Fred Wolf Films, Alvin and the Chipmunks, The Real Ghostbusters, Warner Bros. Animation, Bucky O'Hare and the Toad Wars!, FernGully: The Last Rainforest, Shelley Duvall's Bedtime Stories, Wild West C.O.W.-Boys of Moo Mesa, Marvel Animation, Universal Cartoon Studios, Disney Television Animation), storyboard artist (Spider-Man and His Amazing Friends) and art director (Lady and the Tramp II: Scamp's Adventure), (d. 2021).
- March 24: Noboru Ishiguro, Japanese film director, producer and screenwriter (Space Battleship Yamato II, Super Dimension Fortress Macross, Super Dimension Century Orguss, Humanoid Monster Bem, Megazone 23, Legend of the Galactic Heroes, Tytania), (d. 2012).
- March 31: Arthur B. Rubinstein, American composer (Tiny Toon Adventures, The Simpsons), (d. 2018).

=== April ===
- April 28:
  - Madge Sinclair, Jamaican actress (voice of Sarabi in The Lion King), (d. 1995).
  - Pete Henderson, American comedian (voice of Monkeys in The Jungle Book), (d. 2018).

=== May ===
- May 8: Jean Giraud, French artist, cartoonist, and writer (Les Maitres du temps, Tron, Little Nemo: Adventures in Slumberland, Space Jam), (d. 2012).
- May 15: Dale Case, American animator and film director (The Further Adventures of Uncle Sam).
- May 16: Don Morgan, American animator (UPA, Chuck Jones, Walt Disney Animation, Ralph Bakshi, Hanna-Barbera) and comics artist, (d. 2019).
- May 23: Robert Watts, British producer (Who Framed Roger Rabbit, An American Tail: Fievel Goes West) and actor (provided additional voices for An American Tail: Fievel Goes West), (d. 2024).
- May 24: Tommy Chong, Canadian-American actor, comedian, musician, and artist (voice of Root in Ferngully: The Last Rainforest, Stone in Hoodwinked Too! Hood vs. Evil, Yax in Zootopia, Chief Running Pinto in the South Park episode "Cherokee Hair Tampons", Laird Booney in the Code Monkeys episode "The Secret of 4-20", Bottom Bag in the Uncle Grandpa episode of the same name, himself in The Simpsons episode "A Midsummer's Nice Dream").

=== June ===
- June 2: Marzia Ubaldi, Italian actress (Italian dub voice of Moro in Princess Mononoke, Mama Gunda in Tarzan II, Mrs. Dilber in A Christmas Carol, Mrs. Henscher in ParaNorman), (d. 2023).
- June 6: Vladimír Jiránek, Czech animator, illustrator and film director (co-creator of Pat & Mat), (d. 2012).
- June 8: Ulrich Voß, German actor (German dub voice of Sergeant Cosgrove in Freakazoid!), (d. 2024).
- June 27: Kathryn Beaumont, British actress (voice of Alice in Alice in Wonderland, Wendy Darling in Peter Pan).
- June 28: John Byner, American actor (voice of the title characters in The Ant and the Aardvark, Gurgi and Doli in The Black Cauldron).

=== July ===
- July 1: Aleksandr Kurlyandsky, Russian animation screenwriter (Well, Just You Wait!) and author, (d. 2020).
- July 9: Brian Dennehy, American actor (voice of Django in Ratatouille, Babe Ruth in Everyone's Hero), (d. 2020).
- July 18: Eduardo Manzano, Mexican actor (voice of Don Calcaneo in Marcianos vs. Mexicanos, Khan in Nikté, Latin American voice of Trollstice Bergen in Trolls), (d. 2025).
- July 21: Janet Reno, American lawyer (voiced herself in The Simpsons episode "Dark Knight Court"), (d. 2016).
- July 22: Terence Stamp, English actor (voice of Captain Severus in Ultramarines: A Warhammer 40,000 Movie, Professor Menace in the Static Shock episode "Blast from the Past"), (d. 2025).
- July 25: Renée Victor, American actress (voice of Abuelita in Coco, Dolores del Rey in Victor and Valentino, Gloria in the Fairfax episode "Fairfolks", Pottery Bot and Abuelatron in the Futurama episode "The One Amigo", Latin American dub voice of Laverne in The Hunchback of Notre Dame, Mombi in The Wonderful Wizard of Oz, provided additional voices for The Addams Family), (d. 2025).
- July 27: Gary Gygax, American author and game designer (co-creator of Dungeons & Dragons, voiced himself in the Futurama episode "Anthology of Interest I"), (d. 2008).
- July 30: Michael Bell, American actor (voice of Duke, Xamot, Major Bludd, and Blowtorch in G.I. Joe: A Real American Hero, Lance and Sven in Voltron: Defender of the Universe, Quackerjack in Darkwing Duck and DuckTales, Drew Pickles and Chaz Finster in Rugrats, Grouchy Smurf, Lazy Smurf, and Handy Smurf in The Smurfs, Zan, Riddler, and Gleek in Super Friends, Bruce Banner in The Incredible Hulk, Grogar in My Little Pony, Doctor Octopus in Spider-Man and His Amazing Friends).

=== August ===
- August 19: Diana Muldaur, American actress (voice of Leslie Thompkins in Batman: The Animated Series, Lady Morgana in The Legend of Prince Valiant).
- August 24: Violetta Kolesnikova, Russian animator (Soyuzmultfilm), (d. 2022).
- August 27: Anne Whitfield, American actress (voice of Mermaid in Peter Pan), (d. 2024).
- August 29: Elliott Gould, American actor (voice of Mr. Stoppable in Kim Possible, Toto in The Cat Returns, the title character in the WordGirl episode "The Masked Meat Marauder", himself in The Simpsons episode "The Dad Who Knew Too Little").

=== September ===
- September 1: Alfred Budnick, American animator (Hanna-Barbera) and background artist (Hanna-Barbera, The Nine Lives of Fritz the Cat, Filmation, Camp Candy, Garfield and Friends, Family Dog, The Critic, Hey Arnold!, Hey Arnold!: The Movie, Party Wagon), (d. 2020).
- September 2: Mary Jo Catlett, American actress (voice of Mrs. Puff in SpongeBob SquarePants, The Claw's Mother in the Quack Pack episode "The Long Arm of the Claw", Helga in the Bonkers episode "Trains, Toons, and Toon Trains", Doreen in the Rugrats episode "Auctioning Grandpa", June in the Kim Possible episode "Larry's Birthday", Witch in The Grim Adventures of Billy & Mandy episode "Nursery Crimes", Agnes in the Billy Dilley's Super-Duper Subterranean Summer episode "Billy/Willie", additional voices in The Smurfs).
- September 5: Michael P. Schoenbrun, American production manager (The Simpsons), (d. 1993).
- September 8: Philip L. Clarke, American voice actor, (d. 2013).
- September 9: Bill Flynn, American voice actor (voice of Hiroshi Agasa in Funimation dub of Case Closed, Genzo in One Piece, Roy in Attack on Titan), (d. 2025).
- September 17: Barbera DeLiso, American xerographer (Pac-Man, The Swan Princess), (d. 2020).

=== October ===
- October 2: Rex Reed, American film critic and actor (voiced himself in The Critic), (d. 2026).
- October 18: Dawn Wells, American actress (voice of Mary Ann Summers and Ginger Grant in Gilligan's Planet, Gumbalina Toothington in The Epic Tales of Captain Underpants episode "The Ghastly Danger of the Ghost Dentist"), (d. 2020).
- October 19: Noel Blanc, American actor and son of Mel Blanc (voice of Porky Pig and the Tasmanian Devil in Tiny Toon Adventures).
- October 22:
  - Christopher Lloyd, American actor (portrayed Judge Doom in Who Framed Roger Rabbit, Doc Brown in Back to the Future: The Animated Series, voice of Merlock in DuckTales the Movie: Treasure of the Lost Lamp, the title character in The Pagemaster, Rasputin in Anastasia, Hacker in Cyberchase, the Woodsman in Over the Garden Wall, Mr. Clipboard in Foodfight!, Snail in The Grim Adventures of Billy & Mandy episode "Dumb Luck", Smitty in the King of the Hill episode "Care-Takin Care of Business", Rev. Jim Ignatowski in The Simpsons episode "My Fare Lady", Santa Claus in the Big City Greens episode "Green Christmas").
  - Derek Jacobi, English actor (voice of Nicodemus in The Secret of NIMH, Archibald Craven in The Secret Garden, The Master in Scream of the Shalka, Nezo in Strings, Mr. Operatski in the Angelina Ballerina episode "The Proposal", The Moon in The Amazing World of Gumball episode "The Night").
- October 23: Humpy Wheeler, American racing executive (voice of Tex in the Cars franchise), (d. 2025).
- October 27: Yukiko Nikaido, Japanese actress (voice of Fujiko Mine in Lupin the 3rd Part I), (d. 2026).
- October 28:
  - Ralph Bakshi, Palestinian-born American animator and filmmaker (Fritz the Cat, Heavy Traffic, Coonskin, Wizards, The Lord of the Rings, American Pop, Hey Good Lookin', Fire and Ice, Cool World, Mighty Mouse: The New Adventures).
  - Ben Lanzarone, American composer (Strawberry Shortcake), (d. 2024).
- October 31: Kei Tomiyama, Japanese voice actor (d. 1995).

=== November ===
- November 4:
  - Candy Devine, Australian radio broadcaster and singer (voice of Vera in All Dogs Go to Heaven), (d. 2024).
  - Joe Pytka, American film director (Space Jam).
- November 19:
  - Michael Alaimo, American actor (Doctor in Space Jam), (d. 2025).
  - Ted Turner, American entrepreneur, television producer, media proprietor and philanthropist (Cartoon Network, founder of Turner Broadcasting System, co-creator of Captain Planet and the Planeteers), (d. 2026).
- November 20:
  - Tony Butala, American singer (voice of Lost Boy in Peter Pan), (d. 2026).
  - Colin Fox, Canadian actor (voice of the Wizard in The Care Bears Adventure in Wonderland, Mr. Hinkle in My Pet Monster, King Harkinian in The Legend of Zelda segments of The Super Mario Bros. Super Show!, Large Head in The NeverEnding Story, Uatu in Silver Surfer, Winchester in The Dating Guy, Supreme Overlord Maximus I.Q. in Atomic Betty, Dr. Blood in Bolts & Blip, Purple Man in the X-Men: The Animated Series episode "No Mutant is an Island", provided additional voices for Beetlejuice, Babar, Wild C.A.T.s), (d. 2025).
- November 26: Rich Little, Canadian-American impressionist and actor (voice of the title character in The Pink Panther cartoons "Sink Pink" and "Pink Ice", Richard Nixon in Bebe's Kids, the narrator in The Raccoons specials, himself in the Futurama episodes "Raging Bender" and "Bender's Game").
- November 28: Shingo Araki, Japanese film and television director (Mushi Production, Toei Animation, Tokyo Movie Shinshia) and producer (co-founder of Toei Animation), (d. 2011).

=== December ===
- December 5: Gerrit van Dijk, Dutch animator, filmmaker, actor and painter, (d. 2012).
- December 19: Danny Dark, American voice actor (voice of Superman in Super Friends, announcer for StarKist and Raid), (d. 2004).

== Deaths ==
=== January ===
- January 20:
  - Émile Cohl, French comics artist, caricaturist and film director (Fantasmagorie), dies at age 81.
  - Georges Méliès, French film director, actor, special effects maker and animator (A Trip to the Moon), dies at age 76.

=== February ===
- February 1: Bob Rothberg, American songwriter and lyricist (Fleischer Studios), dies at age 36.

=== March ===
- March 27: Romolo Bacchini, Italian filmmaker, musician, painter, and poet (art director for CAIR (Cartoni Animati Italiani Roma), director or co-director of the unfinished animated feature film The Adventures of Pinocchio, the first animated film based on the namesake novel by Carlo Collodi), dies at age 65.

=== October ===
- October 13: E.C. Segar, American comics artist (creator of Popeye), dies at age 43.

=== November ===
- November 11: Fred Spencer, American animator and comics artist (Walt Disney Animation Studios, developed the character of Donald Duck), dies at age 34 in a road accident.
- November 12: Amedee J. Van Beuren, American producer (Van Beuren Studios), dies at age 59.

=== Specific date unknown ===
- Walter R. Booth, British magician and pioneer of British film (The Hand of the Artist), dies at age 68-69.
