= Mae Questel =

American actress (1908–1998)

- Questel in the 1930s
- Born: Mae Kwestel; September 13, 1908; The Bronx, New York, U.S.
- Died: January 4, 1998 (aged 89); Manhattan, New York, U.S.
- Education: Columbia University
- Occupations: Actress; artist; impersonator; singer; vaudevillian
- Years active: 1930–1989
- Known for: Voice of Betty Boop, Olive Oyl and Little Audrey
- Notable work: Betty Boop; Popeye the Sailor; Noveltoons
- Spouse: Leo Balkin (m. 1930, div. before 1950) Jack E. Shelby (m. 1970; died 1996)
- Children: 2

Mae Questel (/ˈmeɪ ˌkwɛˈstɛl/; born Mae Kwestel; September 13, 1908 – January 4, 1998) was an American actress. She was best known for providing the voices for the animated characters Betty Boop (from 1931) and Olive Oyl (from 1933).

Questel began her career in vaudeville, primarily working as an impressionist. She later performed on Broadway and in films and television, including her role as Aunt Bethany (her final role) in National Lampoon's Christmas Vacation (1989).

== Early life and career ==
Born Mae Kwestel on September 13, 1908, in the Bronx, New York City, to Simon and Freida (née Glauberman) Kwestel, she attended Morris High School and studied acting at the American Theatre Wing and with the Theatre Guild. Although she wanted to be an entertainer, her parents, who were Orthodox Jews, actively discouraged her from doing so, at one point forcing her to leave the Theatre Guild school. It was her drama teacher, Joseph G. Geiger, that changed her name to Questel.

Nevertheless, at the age of 17, Questel won a talent contest held at the RKO Fordham Theatre in the Bronx by imitating actress and singer Helen Kane. She was signed by an agent and began performing in vaudeville as an impersonator. Billed as "Mae Questel – Personality Singer of Personality Songs", she did impressions of Fanny Brice, Marlene Dietrich, Eddie Cantor, Mae West, Maurice Chevalier, and others, as well as doing animal imitations.

Questel also attended Columbia University, where she studied drama.

== Voice work ==
=== Betty Boop ===
She was seen by animator Max Fleischer, who was looking for an actress to provide the voice for his Betty Boop character. Questel's "Boop-boop-a-doop" routine, done in a style similar to the version Helen Kane created, while at the same time evoking something of the naughty allure of film star Clara Bow, was exactly what Fleischer wanted, and he hired Questel in 1931. She began as one of a number of actresses providing the character's voice, but soon took over the role exclusively.

From 1931 until 1938, Questel provided the voice of Betty Boop in more than 80 animated shorts, the longest run for any actress doing that voice. During the 1930s, she released a recording of "On the Good Ship Lollipop", which sold more than two million copies. She starred in more than a hundred short films during he time. Starting in 1938, Margie Hines, who was the original voice of Betty Boop, replaced Mae Questel when production made the transition from New York to the Miami Studio in Florida.

In 1988, she reprised her role as Betty Boop in a cameo appearance in Who Framed Roger Rabbit, which was Questel's most extensive work for Disney; she had provided brief additional voices for some of Disney's earlier films.

=== Olive Oyl ===
Beginning in 1933, Questel provided the voice for Olive Oyl in the Max Fleischer Popeye cartoons. She made her debut with "I Eats Me Spinach" and essentially became the permanent voice until her hiatus to start a family in 1938. She reportedly based Olive's nasal vocal quality and expression, "Oh, dear!", on character actress ZaSu Pitts.

Questel returned as the voice of Olive Oyl in 1944 after the studio reorganized as Famous Studios, Paramount Pictures and had returned to New York, a role in which she would remain until 1962. She also filled in for Jack Mercer as the voice of Popeye for a small number of cartoons, made when Mercer was temporarily drawn into war service, alongside Floyd Buckley and Harry Foster Welch.

When Hanna-Barbera began making the All New Popeye cartoons for television in 1978, Questel auditioned for the role of Olive Oyl, but lost out to Marilyn Schreffler.

=== Other voices ===
In addition to her signature voices of Olive Oyl and Betty Boop, Questel also provided the voice of Little Audrey. In 1935, Mae Questel played the voice of the Woman in the Shoe in the Max Fleischer cartoon, The Kids in the Shoe.

In 1958, she voiced Wendy the Good Little Witch in the theatrical Casper cartoon short Which is Witch. In the 1950s, she was the voice for the title character of the pioneering interactive Saturday-morning cartoon series Winky Dink and You. She provided the voice of Casper, the Friendly Ghost in Golden Records' Casper the Friendly Ghost and Little Audrey Says in 1962.

In The Flintstones series, she voiced characters from the spin-offs The Pebbles and Bamm-Bamm Show, The Flintstone Comedy Hour, and the Flintstone Frolics. She voiced Wiggy Rockstone after the original voice actress, Gay Autterson, left the role in 1982.

== On-camera roles ==
Questel played a number of small parts, including appearing with Rudy Vallée as Betty Boop in the 1931 short Musical Justice and as a nurse in The Musical Doctor in 1932.

In 1962, she played a Jewish mother in an episode of crime drama Naked City. She was also seen as a middle-aged bride in Jerry Lewis' It's Only Money. In 1968, she was one of Fanny Brice's mother's card-playing friends at the start of the film Funny Girl.

In 1973, Questel had a role in the short-lived ABC television sitcom The Corner Bar, but she achieved perhaps her greatest visibility in television commercials, notably playing "Aunt Bluebell" in ads for Scott Towels from 1971 to 1979, and appeared in spots for Playtex, Folger's Coffee, and others. She also appeared on panel shows and in daytime soap operas.

In 1989, she appeared as the "Jewish Mama from Hell" in New York Stories in Woody Allen's segment titled "Oedipus Wrecks"; she had earlier sung the song "Chameleon Days" on the soundtrack for Allen's film Zelig in 1983.

Her last onscreen appearance was as the elderly Aunt Bethany in 1989's Christmas slapstick comedy film National Lampoon's Christmas Vacation.

== Personal life ==
Questel married Leo Balkin on December 22, 1930, and they were divorced prior to 1950. They had two sons, Robert Balkin and Richard Balkin. She married Jack E. Shelby on November 19, 1970; they remained married until his death in 1996.

== Death ==
Questel died on January 4, 1998, from complications related to Alzheimer's disease at the age of 89 in her Manhattan apartment. She was buried in New Montefiore Cemetery in West Babylon, New York.

== On-Stage ==
Questel appeared on Broadway four times:

- Doctor Social (1948) with Dean Jagger
- Leonard Spigelgass' A Majority of One (1959) with Cedric Hardwicke and Barnard Hughes – she reprised her role (as "Essie Rubin") in the film adaptation
- Enter Laughing (1963) based on the novel by Carl Reiner, with Alan Arkin, Alan Mowbray, Sylvia Sidney and Michael J. Pollard and
- Bajour (1964), the Walter Marks musical, starring Herschel Bernardi, Nancy Dussault and Chita Rivera

== Voice work ==
=== As Betty Boop ===
Year	Title	Additional roles	Notes
1931	Silly Scandals		
1931	Bimbo's Express		
1931	Minding the Baby		
1931	Kitty from Kansas		
1931	Musical Justice		
1932	Minnie the Moocher		
1932	Crazy-Town		
1932	Just One More Chance		
1932	Chess-Nuts		
1932	Oh! How I Hate to Get Up in the Morning		
1932	Admission Free		
1932	The Betty Boop Limited		
1932	Rudy Vallee Melodies		
1932	Betty Boop, M.D.		
1932	Just a Gigolo		
1932	Betty Boop's Bamboo Isle		
1932	Betty Boop's Ups and Downs		
1932	Romantic Melodies		
1932	Betty Boop for President		
1932	Time on My Hands		
1932	Let Me Call You Sweetheart	Aloysius	
1932	Betty Boop's Museum	Big Lady / Mummy	
1933	Betty Boop's Crazy Inventions		
1933	Is My Palm Read		
1933	Betty Boop's Penthouse		
1933	Popeye the Sailor		
1933	I Heard		
1933	Snow-White	Evil Queen	
1933	Popular Melodies	Children	
1933	Betty Boop's Birthday Party	Aloysius	
1934	Betty Boop's Rise to Fame		Uncredited, archived sound
1934	Betty Boop's Trial		
1934	Ha! Ha! Ha!		
1934	There's Something About a Soldier		
1934	Betty Boop's Prize Show		
1934	Keep in Style		
1934	When My Ship Comes In		
1934	Poor Cinderella	Ugly Step-Sisters / Mice	
1934	Betty Boop's Little Pal	Pudgy	
1935	Baby Be Good		
1935	Taking the Blame		
1935	Stop That Noise		
1935	Swat the Fly		
1935	No! No! A Thousand Times No!!		
1935	Betty Boop and Grampy		
1935	Judge for a Day		
1935	Betty Boop with Henry, the Funniest Living American		
1935	A Language All My Own		
1935	Making Stars	Babies	
1936	Betty Boop and Little Jimmy	Little Jimmy	
1936	Little Nobody	Pudgy / Snooty Puppy	
1936	We Did It	Pudgy / Kitten	
1936	Grampy's Indoor Outing	Junior	
1936	Not Now	Pudgy	
1936	Happy You and Merry Me	Pudgy	
1936	Training Pigeons	Pudgy	
1936	More Pep	Pudgy	
1936	Betty Boop and the Little King		
1936	You're Not Built That Way		
1936	Be Human		
1936	Making Friends		
1936	A Song a Day		
1937	Pudgy Takes a Bow-Wow	Pudgy	
1937	Pudgy Picks a Fight	Pudgy	
1937	The Foxy Hunter	Pudgy / Junior	
1937	The New Deal Show	Cats / Puppy	
1937	House Cleaning Blues		
1937	The Hot Air Salesman		
1937	The Impractical Joker		
1937	Ding Dong Doggie		
1937	The Candid Candidate		
1937	Service with a Smile		
1937	Zula Hula		
1937	Whoops! I'm a Cowboy		
1938	Riding the Rails	Pudgy	
1938	Pudgy the Watchman	Pudgy	
1938	Buzzy Boop at the Concert		
1938	Be Up to Date		
1938	Honest Love and True		
1938	On with the New		
1939	So Does an Automobile		
1988	Who Framed Roger Rabbit		

=== As Olive Oyl ===
Year	Title	Additional roles	Notes
1933	I Eats My Spinach		Uncredited
1934	The Man on the Flying Trapeze	Nana Oyl	Uncredited
1934	Can You Take It		Uncredited
1934	Shoein' Hosses		Uncredited
1934	Shiver Me Timbers!		Uncredited
1934	Axe Me Another		Uncredited
1934	A Dream Walking		Uncredited
1934	The Two-Alarm Fire		Uncredited
1934	The Dance Contest		Uncredited
1934	We Aim to Please		Uncredited
1935	Beware of Barnacle Bill		Uncredited
1935	Be Kind to 'Aminals'		Uncredited
1935	Pleased to Meet Cha!		Uncredited
1935	The 'Hyp-Nut-Tist'		Uncredited
1935	Choose Your 'Weppins'		Uncredited
1935	King of the Mardi Gras		Uncredited
1935	You Gotta Be a Football Hero		Uncredited
1935	Adventures of Popeye		Uncredited
1935	The Spinach Overture		Uncredited
1935	For Better or Worser		Uncredited
1936	Vim, Vigor and Vitaliky		Uncredited
1936	Brotherly Love		Uncredited
1936	I-Ski Love-Ski You-Ski		Uncredited
1936	Bridge Ahoy!		Uncredited
1936	I Wanna Be a Life Guard		Uncredited
1936	Let's Get Movin'		Uncredited
1936	Never Kick a Woman		Uncredited
1936	Popeye the Sailor Meets Sindbad the Sailor		Uncredited
1936	Hold the Wire		Uncredited
1936	The Spinach Roadster		Uncredited
1936	I'm in the Army Now		Uncredited
1936	A Clean Shaven Man		Uncredited
1936	Little Swee'pea	Swee' Pea	Uncredited
1937	The Paneless Window Washer		Uncredited
1937	My Artistical Temperature		Uncredited
1937	Hospitaliky		Uncredited
1937	The Twisker Pitcher		Uncredited
1937	Morning, Noon and Night Club		Uncredited
1937	I Never Changes My Altitude		Uncredited
1937	Popeye the Sailor Meets Ali Baba's Forty Thieves		Uncredited
1937	Fowl Play		Uncredited
1937	Organ Grinder's Swing		Uncredited
1937	Lost and Foundry	Swee' Pea	Uncredited
1937	The Football Toucher Downer	Swee' Pea	Uncredited
1937	I Like Babies and Infinks	Swee' Pea	Uncredited
1937	Protek the Weakerist	Floppy	Uncredited
1938	Let's Celebrake	Grandma	Uncredited
1938	Learn Polikeness		Uncredited
1938	The House Builder-Upper		Uncredited
1938	Mutiny Ain't Nice		Uncredited
1938	A Date to Skate		Uncredited
1938	Big Chief Ugh-Amugh-Ugh		Uncredited
1944	The Anvil Chorus Girl		Uncredited
1944	Spinach Packin' Popeye		Uncredited
1944	Puppet Love		Uncredited
1944	Pitchin' Woo at the Zoo		Uncredited
1944	She-Sick Sailors		Uncredited
1945	Tops in the Big Top		Uncredited
1945	Shape Ahoy		Uncredited
1945	For Better or Nurse		Uncredited
1945	Mess Production		Uncredited
1946	House Tricks?		Uncredited
1946	Service with a Guile		Uncredited
1946	Klondike Casanova		Uncredited
1946	Peep in the Deep		Uncredited
1946	Rocket to Mars		Uncredited
1946	Rodeo Romeo		Uncredited
1946	The Fistic Mystic		Uncredited
1946	The Island Fling		Uncredited
1947	Abusement Park		Uncredited
1947	I'll Be Skiing Ya		Uncredited
1947	The Royal Four-Flusher		Uncredited
1947	Popeye and the Pirates		Uncredited
1947	Wotta Knight		Uncredited
1947	Safari So Good		Uncredited
1947	All's Fair at the Fair		Uncredited
1948	Popeye Meets Hercules	Swooning Ladies	Uncredited
1948	Olive Oyl for President		Uncredited
1948	Wigwam Whoopee		Uncredited
1948	Pre-Hysterical Man		Uncredited
1948	A Wolf in Sheik's Clothing		Uncredited
1948	Spinach vs Hamburgers		Uncredited
1948	Snow Place Like Home		Uncredited
1948	Robin Hood-Winked		Uncredited
1948	Symphony in Spinach		Uncredited
1949	Popeye's Premiere		Uncredited
1949	Lumberjack and Jill		Uncredited
1949	Hot Air Aces		Uncredited
1949	A Balmy Swami		Uncredited
1949	Silly Hillbilly		Uncredited
1949	Barking Dogs Don't Fite		Uncredited
1949	Taw with a Star		Uncredited
1950	Gym Jam		Uncredited
1950	Jitterbug Jive		Uncredited
1950	Popeye Makes a Movie		Uncredited
1950	The Farmer and the Belle		Uncredited
1950	Quick on the Vigor		Uncredited
1950	Beach Peach		Uncredited
1950	Baby Wants Spinach	Swee' Pea	Uncredited
1951	Thrill of Fair	Swee' Pea	Uncredited
1951	Vacation with Play		Uncredited
1951	Double-Cross-Country Race		Uncredited
1951	Let's Stalk Spinach		Uncredited
1951	Alpine for You		Uncredited
1952	Lunch with a Punch		Uncredited
1952	Big Bad Sindbad		Uncredited
1952	Swimmer Take All		Uncredited
1953	Child Sockology	Swee' Pea	Uncredited
1953	Popeye's Mirthday		Uncredited
1953	Toreadorable		Uncredited
1953	Baby Wants a Battle		Uncredited
1953	Firemen's Brawl		Uncredited
1953	Shaving Mugs		Uncredited
1953	Ancient Fistory		Uncredited
1954	Floor Flusher		Uncredited
1954	Popeye's 20th Anniversary		Uncredited
1954	Bride and Gloom		Uncredited
1954	Greek Mirthology		Uncredited
1954	Fright to the Finish		Uncredited
1954	Private Eye Popeye		Uncredited
1954	Taxi-Turvy		Uncredited
1955	Cookin' with Gags		Uncredited
1955	Beaus Will Be Beaus		Uncredited
1955	Gift of Gag		Uncredited
1955	Car-azy Drivers		Uncredited
1955	Penny Antics		Uncredited
1955	A Job for a Gob		Uncredited
1955	Mister and Mistletoe		Uncredited
1955	Cops Is Tops	Leading Female Officer	Uncredited
1955	Nurse to Meet Ya	Swee' Pea	Uncredited
1956	Hill-billing and Cooing		Uncredited
1956	Out to Punch		Uncredited
1956	Assault and Flattery		Uncredited
1956	A Haul in One		Uncredited
1956	I Don't Scare		Uncredited
1956	Parlez Vous Woo		Uncredited
1956	Popeye for President		Uncredited
1957	Nearlyweds		Uncredited
1957	Spooky Swabs		Uncredited
1957	The Crystal Brawl		Uncredited
1960-1962	Popeye the Sailor	Swee' Pea / Various Voices	

=== As Little Audrey ===
Year	Title	Additional Roles	Notes
1947	Santa's Surprise		Uncredited
1948	Butterscotch and Soda		Uncredited
1949	The Lost Dream		Uncredited
1949	Song of the Birds		Uncredited
1950	Tart's and Flowers		Uncredited
1950	Goofy Goofy Gander		Uncredited
1951	Hold the Lion Please		Uncredited
1951	Audrey the Rainmaker		Uncredited
1952	Law and Audrey		Uncredited
1952	The Case of the Cockeyed Canary	Mary Canary / Ugly Bird	Uncredited
1953	Surf Bored		Uncredited
1954	The Seapreme Court	Little Fishes	Uncredited
1955	Dizzy Dishes	Audrey's Mother	Uncredited
1955	Little Audrey Riding Hood	Audrey's Mother / Phone Operator	Uncredited
1957	Fishing Tackler		Uncredited
1958	Dawg Gawn		Uncredited

=== In Casper series ===
Year	Title	Role	Notes
1949	A Haunting We Will Go	Ghost Teacher	
1950	Casper's Spree Under the Sea	Goldie the Goldfish	
1950	Casper the Friendly Ghost - Once Upon a Rhyme	Little Red Riding Hood / Little Miss Muffet / Three Blind Mice	
1951	Casper the Friendly Ghost - To Boo or Not to Boo	Lou / Ladies at Door	
1951	Casper the Friendly Ghost - Boo Scout	Billy	
1951	Casper the Friendly Ghost - Boo Hoo Baby	Babies	
1952	Casper the Friendly Ghost - The Deep Boo Sea	Billy / Billy's Brother's Friend	
1952	Casper the Friendly Ghost - Ghost of the Town	Baby / Kids	
1952	Casper the Friendly Ghost - Spunky Skunky	Skunky	
1952	Casper the Friendly Ghost - Cage Fright	Alfred	
1952	True Boo	Billy / Billy's Mother	
1952	Pig-a-Boo	Junior Pig / Mama Pig	
1953	Spook No Evil	Jako / Monkeys	
1953	By the Old Mill Scream	Short-Tail	
1953	Little Boo-Peep	Little Bo Peep	
1953	Boo and Saddles	Billy	
1954	Casper Genie	Billy	
1954	Puss 'n' Boos	Kittens	
1954	Boos and Arrows	Little Feather / Baby	
1955	Hide and Shriek	Spooky / Kitten	
1955	Spooking with a Brogue	Billy	
1955	Bull Fright	Pancho	
1956	Line of Screammage	Billy / Neighborhood Kid / Tony's Friend	
1957	Peek-a-Boo	Kitten / Scared Boy	
1957	Hooky Spooky	Little Ghosts' Teacher	
1957	Ice Scream	Billy / Older Boy	
1957	Ghost of Honor	Phone Operator	
1958	Spook and Span	Little Girl	
1958	Ghost Writers	Three Blind Mice / Goldie	
1958	Which is Witch?	Wendy the Good Little Witch	
1959	Not Ghoulty	Baby	
1959	Casper's Birthday Party		

=== Other voice work ===
Year	Title	Role	Notes
1931	And the Green Grass Grew All Around	Vocalist	Uncredited
1934	Sock-a-Bye, Baby	Baby	Uncredited
1934	Strong to the Finich	Children	Uncredited
1934	Little Dutch Mill	Various Voices	Uncredited
1935	The Lost Chick	Squirrel Children	Uncredited
1935	The Kids in the Shoe	Woman in the Shoe / Kids	Uncredited
1935	Dancing on the Moon	Various Voices	Uncredited
1935	Somewhere in Dreamland	Mother / Boy / Girl	Uncredited
1936	The Cobweb Hotel	Flies	Uncredited
1936	Greedy Humpty Dumpty	Little Bo Peep	Uncredited
1936	Hawaiian Birds	Hawaiian Birds	Uncredited
1936	New Shoes	Girl's Shoes	Uncredited
1936	Christmas Comes But Once a Year	Orphan	Uncredited
1937	Bunny Mooning	Bunny	Uncredited
1937	Peeping Penguins	Mother Peguin	
1937	Chicken a la King	Chickens	
1937	Little Lamby	Lamb / Animals	
1937	Educated Fish		
1938	The Tears of an Onion	Various Vegetables	Uncredited
1938	The Playful Polar Bears	Baby Polar Bear	Uncredited
1938	Hold It	Cats	
1940	The Fulla Bluff Man	Cavewoman	Uncredited
1941	Mr. Bug Goes to Town	Buzz	Uncredited
1944	Gabriel Churchkitten	Peter the Mouse	Uncredited
1944	Lulu's Birthday Party	Kids	
1945	Scrappily Married	Queen Card Scream	Uncredited
1945	Snap Happy	Female Audience Members	
1946	Bargain Counter Attack	Section Manager's Baby Cries	
1946	Bored of Education	Students	
1947	Musica-Lulu	Little Violin / Kid	
1947	A Bout with a Trout	Teacher	
1947	The Baby Sitter	Mrs. Jones / Alvin Jones	
1948	Flip Flap	Flip Flap	
1948	Land of the Lost	Isabel	Uncredited
1948	The Lone Star State	Little Bo Peep	Uncredited
1948	Readin', Writin', and Rythmetic	Owl Teacher / Quincy Quack / Goldie Goldfish	Uncredited
1948	The Mite Makes Right	Tom Thumb's Mother	
1949	The Emerald Isle	Wild Irish Rose	Uncredited
1949	Spring Song	Mrs. Robin	Uncredited
1949	Our Funny Finny Friends	Carmen Miranda Fish	Uncredited
1949	Marriage Wows	Bertha Mouse / Raccoon	Uncredited
1949	Snow Foolin'	Hen / Mama Bird	Uncredited
1949	Toys Will Be Toys	Doll Princess	Uncredited
1949	Leprechauns Gold	Molly	
1949	Campus Capers	Various Mice	
1950	Land of the Lost Jewels	Isabel	Uncredited
1950	Teacher's Pet	Junior's Mother / Worm	Uncredited
1950	Quack-a-Doodle-Doo	Baby Huey's Mother	Uncredited
1951	One Quack Mind	Baby Huey's Mother / Hen on Phone	Uncredited
1951	Tweet Music	Little Eagle / Ostrich	Uncredited
1951	Mice Paradice	Herman's Cousin #4	Uncredited
1951	Land of Lost Watches	Isabel / Rosita Wristwatch	Uncredited
1951	Miners Forty-Niners	Gold Digger / Clementine	Uncredited
1951	Party Smarty	Oscar / Baby Huey's Mother	Uncredited
1951	Scout Fellow	Baby Huey's Mother	Uncredited
1952	Clown on the Farm	Baby Huey's Mother	Uncredited
1952	Fun at the Fair	Cow	Uncredited
1953	Hysterical History	Prisillla / Pocohontas / Phone Operator	Uncredited
1953	Starting from Hatch	Baby Huey's Mother	Uncredited
1953	Huey's Ducky Daddy	Baby Huey's Mother	Uncredited
1953	Aero-Nutics	Josephine / Baby Chicks	Uncredited
1953	Of Mice and Magic	Louise the Mouse	Uncredited
1953	No Place Like Rome	Woman / Babies	Uncredited
1953-1957	Winky-Dink and You	Winky Dink	Television Series
1954	Crazy Town	Baby / Mother	Uncredited
1954	The Oily Bird	Bluebirds	Uncredited
1954	Hair Today, Gone Tomorrow	Katnip's Girlfriend	Uncredited
1954	Of Mice and Menace	Herman's Nephew #1	
1955	Git Along Li'l Duckie	Baby Huey's Mother	Uncredited
1955	Bicep Built for Two	Cute Kitty	Uncredited
1955	News Hound	Lady	Uncredited
1955	Poop Goes the Weasel	Wishbone	Uncredited
1955	Mouse Trapeze	Herman's Nephew #3	Uncredited
1955	Monsieur Herman	Herman's Cousin	Uncredited
1955	Kitty Cornered	Cuddles	Uncredited
1955	Keep Your Grin Up	Screaming Tattoo Lady	Uncredited
1956	Ground Hog Play	Hillary / Boy #2	Uncredited
1956	Sleuth But Sure	Female Rabbit	Uncredited
1956	Dutch Treat	Hans	Uncredited
1956	Swab the Duck	Duckling	Uncredited
1956	Penguin for Your Thoughts	Baby Penguin's Cries	Uncredited
1956	Will Do Mousework	Maid	Uncredited
1956	Pedro and Lorenzo	Young Pedro	Uncredited
1956	Sir Irving and Jeames	Worthington	Uncredited
1956	Hide and Peak	Herman's Cousin #3	Uncredited
1956	Mouseum	Herman's Cousin #1	Uncredited
1957	Pest Pupil	Baby Huey's Mother	Uncredited
1957	Jumping with Toy	Baby Huey's Mother	Uncredited
1957	Sky Scrappers	Herman's Cousin #2	Uncredited
1957	L'Amour the Merrier	Princess Louise / Hector's Mother / Monsieur Renior's Sister	Uncredited
1957	From Mad to Worse	Various Mice	Uncredited
1957	One Funny Knight	Princess Guinevere	Uncredited
1957	Cock-a-Doodle Dino	Danny's Mom	Uncredited
1957	Cats in the Act	Murgatroyd	Uncredited
1958	Dante Dreamer	Dante's Mother	Uncredited
1958	Heir Restorer	Nurse	Uncredited
1958	You Said a Mouseful	Chubby	Uncredited
1958	Stork Raving Mad	Baby / Mother	
1958	Okey Dokey Donkey	Marilyn	
1959	Owly to Bed	Hootie the Baby Owl	Uncredited
1959	Fit to Be Toyed	J.G.'s Wife / Little Boy	Uncredited
1959	Felineous Assualt	Kitnip	Uncredited
1959	Fun on Furlough	Louie	Uncredited
1959	Talking Horse Sense	Ethel	Uncredited
1959	T.V. Fuddlehead	Guy's Wife / Toothpaste Lady	
1959 - 1962	Matty's Funnies with Beany and Cecil	Casper / Little Audrey / Additional Voices	
1960	Be Mice to Cats	Skit the Mouse	Uncredited
1960	Planet Mouseola	Skit the Mouse	Uncredited
1960	Counter Attack	Skit the Mouse	Uncredited
1960	Trouble Date	Cuddles	Uncredited
1960	Monkey Doodles	George's Wife / Mrs. Noseybody	Uncredited
1960	Bells Are Ringing	Olga	Uncredited
1960	Disguise the Limit	Miss Updike	Uncredited
1960	Shootin' Stars	Little Boy	Uncredited
1964	Valentine's Day	Olive the Parrot	TV Series: Episode: "The Baritone Canary"
1983	Zelig	Helen Kane	

== On-screen work ==
=== Film ===
Year	Title	Role	Notes
1932	Wayward	Showgirl	Uncredited
1932	One Hour with You	Office Worker	Uncredited
1932	Knowmore College	Dumb Co-ed	Uncredited
1932	The Musical Doctor	Nurse Clef	
1936	The Great Ziegfeld	Rosie	Uncredited
1936	After the Thin Man	Party Guest	Uncredited
1958	Hansel and Gretel		TV Movie
1960	Silly Science	Wife	
1960	Electronica	Henry's Wife	
1961	A Majority of One	Essie Rubin	
1962	It's Only Money	Cecilia	
1968	Funny Girl	Mrs. Strakosh	
1970	Move	Mrs. Katz	
1985	Hot Resort	Mrs. Labowitz	
1989	New York Stories	Mother	Segment "Oedipus Wrecks"
1989	National Lampoon's Christmas Vacation	Aunt Bethany	

=== Television ===
Year	Title	Role	Notes
1961-1962	The Gertrude Berg Show	Jenny	2 episodes
1962	77 Sunset Strip	Cuddles McGee	Episode: "Penthouse on Skid Row"
1962	Naked City	Mrs. Anette Faber	Episode: "To Walk Like a Lion'
1973	The Corner Bar	Aunt Blanche	Episode: "Aunt Blanche"
1975	Somerset	Miriam Briskin	252 episodes
1983	All My Children	Miss Hardy	Episode: #1.3581
