= Ding Dong Doggie =

- Directed by: Dave Fleischer
- Produced by: Max Fleischer
- Starring: Mae Questel; Jack Mercer
- Animation by: Frank Endres; Thomas Johnson
- Color process: Black-and-white
- Production company: Fleischer Studios
- Distributed by: Paramount Pictures
- Release date: July 23, 1937
- Running time: 7 minutes
- Country: United States
- Language: English

Ding Dong Doggie is a 1937 Fleischer Studios animated short film starring Betty Boop.

== Synopsis ==
Pudgy the Pup is impressed by a dalmatian fire dog he sees out his window. Against Betty Boop's orders, Pudgy accompanies the fire dog to a fire at a general store. Pudgy tries to help out, but the fire takes on a (animated) life of its own and gets the better of Pudgy. In the end, Pudgy is happy to run back home to Betty Boop who is not happy that Pudgy left and disobeyed her.

== Notes ==
The fourth and last time Betty spanks Pudgy for punishment. She also spanked him in Betty Boop's Little Pal, Taking the Blame and We Did It.
