= When My Ship Comes In (disambiguation) =

When My Ship Comes In is a 1934 short film featuring Betty Boop. The phrase may also refer to:

- "When My Ship Comes In", a song by Clint Black from his album The Hard Way
- "When My Ship Comes In", a song by Jeff Watson from his album Around the Sun
