= Betty Boop's Trial =

- Directed by: Dave Fleischer
- Produced by: Max Fleischer
- Starring: Mae Questel; Cab Calloway (uncredited)
- Animation by: Hicks Lokey; Myron Waldman
- Color process: Black-and-white
- Production company: Fleischer Studios
- Distributed by: Paramount Pictures
- Release date: June 15, 1934
- Running time: 7 minutes
- Country: United States
- Language: English

Betty Boop's Trial is a 1934 Fleischer Studios animated short film, starring Betty Boop.

== Plot ==
When handsome motorcycle police officer Freddy pursues Betty, she accidentally breaks the speed limit. Freddy is forced to arrest her and take her to traffic court. Betty pleads her case in song, but the judge and jury are more interested in her body than what she has to say. After the jury finds her not guilty, Betty starts celebrating as do the jury and Freddy having been kissed by Betty.

== Notes and comments ==
- This short is the second appearance of Fearless Fred, Betty's semi-regular boyfriend, as he had previously appeared in She Wronged Him Right, but they don't seem to know each other in this cartoon.
- The last Betty Boop short made before the effects of the Hays Office were felt. One scene has Betty's skirt whirling up, briefly revealing her panty-clad rear end.
- A scene briefly showing Freddy in blackface was removed from later colorized prints.
- Excerpts of the courtroom scene were shown in the February 21, 1976 edition of Weekend Update on Saturday Night Live, being passed off as an "Artist's Rendering" of the week's developments in the Patty Hearst trial.
