= Winky Dink and You =

American children's television series (1953–1957)

Winky Dink and You title card

Winky Dink and You is a CBS children's television show that aired from 1953 to 1957, on Saturday mornings at 10:30 a.m. Eastern / 9:30 Central. It was hosted by Jack Barry and featured the exploits of an animated character named Winky Dink (voiced by Mae Questel) and his dog Woofer, with sound effects provided by Joseph Scholnick.

The show, created by Harry Prichett, Sr. and Ed Wyckoff, featured Barry and his sidekick, the incompetent Mr. Bungle (veteran children's show voice actor Dayton Allen), introducing clips of Winky Dink, who was noted for his plaid pants, tousled star-shaped hair, and large eyes.

== Interactivity ==
Children interacting with the Winky Dink and You program

The central gimmick of the show, praised by Microsoft co-founder Bill Gates as "the first interactive TV show", was the use of a "magic drawing screen" — a piece of transparent vinyl plastic that stuck to the television screen by means of static electricity. A kit containing the screen and various Winky Dink crayons could be purchased for 50 cents. At a climactic scene in every Winky Dink animated short film, Winky would arrive on a scene that contained a connect-the-dots picture that could be navigated only with the help of viewers. Winky Dink then would prompt the children at home to complete the picture, and the finished result would help him continue the story. Examples included drawing a bridge to cross a river, using an axe to chop down a tree, or creating a cage to trap a dangerous lion.

Another use of the interactive screen was to decode messages. An image would be displayed, showing only the vertical lines of the letters of the secret message. Viewers would then quickly trace onto their magic screen, and a second image would display the horizontal lines, completing the text.

A final use of the screen was to create the outline of a character with whom Jack Barry would have a conversation. It would seem meaningless to viewers without the screen, further encouraging its purchase.

== Origin ==
Harry Prichett came up with the core idea in the 1950s of drawing on the screen when working as a graphic designer for an advertising agency that had the account for Benrus Watches, a principal sponsor of Your Show of Shows, NBC's Saturday evening variety show starring Sid Caesar and Imogene Coca. Benrus reported that a number of its dealers had to deal with viewers who were angry to find that the expensive wristwatch on one of the commercials could not be bought for $39.95. (This is roughly equivalent to $480 in 2025, but was considered a modest price for a fine watch at that time.) The agency was concerned that viewers were not seeing the "and up" after the "$39.95" because early TV sets varied in overscan by which they "cut off" the edges of the picture.

Agency staffers were asked to watch the show and report back what was visible on their screens. Prichett decided to put a piece of cellulose acetate film, a standard tool in graphic arts at the time, over the screen so he could use a grease pencil to sketch exactly which parts of the commercial were visible. As he waited, he started to add drawings to the images on the screen, then erase them and add new ones. It seemed obvious to him that children would enjoy working this way with their television sets.

== Cancellation and revival ==
The program was successful because of its pioneering interactive marketing scheme, and Winky Dink became one of television's most popular characters of the 1950s. However, its production was halted despite its popularity, because of concerns about x-rays from TV picture tubes. This was particularly true for early color television sets. CBS also was concerned about parents' complaints that children who did not possess the interactive screen were drawing directly on the TV screen.

The show was revived in syndication for 65 episodes, beginning in 1969 and ending in 1973. In the 1990s, a new "Winky Dink Kit" was sold, containing a screen, crayons, and all-new digitized Winky Dink and You episodes.
