= When My Ship Comes In =

1934 short film by Dave Fleischer

- Directed by: Dave Fleischer
- Produced by: Max Fleischer
- Starring: Mae Questel
- Animation by: Hicks Lokey; Myron Waldman
- Color process: Black-and-white
- Production company: Fleischer Studios
- Distributed by: Paramount Pictures
- Release date: December 21, 1934
- Running time: 7 minutes
- Language: English

When My Ship Comes In is a 1934 Fleischer Studios animated short film starring Betty Boop.

== Plot ==
After Betty wins $1 million from a horse race/sweepstakes, she daydreams how to best use her funds. She spends it on free servants for the city's people, a huge ice cream mountain for the children of the city, a milk company which delivers milk by attaching milk bottles to balloons, releasing them in the air and onto the doorsteps of the town's citizens, complex gadgets for the animals at her animal farm, a trolley line with recliners and a maids' home next to a bachelors' home. Betty also spends her money to combat the effects of the Great Depression by starting department stores, clothing stores, and reopening factories. By the time she has spent most of her sweepstakes money, the whole country has overcome the Depression.
