= Riding the Rails =

- Directed by: Dave Fleischer
- Produced by: Max Fleischer
- Starring: Mae Questel
- Animation by: Hicks Lokey; Myron Waldman
- Color process: Black-and-white
- Production company: Fleischer Studios
- Distributed by: Paramount Pictures
- Release date: January 28, 1938
- Running time: 6 minutes
- Country: United States
- Language: English

Riding the Rails is a 1938 Fleischer Studios animated short film featuring Betty Boop and Pudgy the Pup. Although some sources claim that this film was nominated for an Academy Award, it does not appear in the official Academy Awards database, apparently being confused with "Ridin' the Rails", which was nominated for Best One-Reel (Live Action) Short Subject at the 1951 Academy Awards.

The film inspired a large variety of collectibles in the 1930s, although originals are now rare to find.

== Synopsis ==
Film Daily called the film "subway fun", and gave the following synopsis:

"The exciting adventures of Betty Boop's dog, Pudgy, who insists on following his mistress when she goes downtown in the subway. He gets on the train, and then his troubles begin. After almost disrupting the train service, he is flung off, and is forced to walk the tracks back to the station, with trains whizzing down on him from all directions. When he finally arrives safely back home, he is cured of wanting to trail around town with Betty."
