= You're Not Built That Way =

- Directed by: Dave Fleischer
- Produced by: Max Fleischer
- Starring: Mae Questel
- Music by: Sammy Timberg (uncredited)
- Animation by: Animated by: Myron Waldman and Hicks Lokey; Lillian Friedman Astor (uncredited)
- Color process: Black-and-white
- Production company: Fleischer Studios
- Distributed by: Paramount Pictures
- Release date: July 17, 1936
- Running time: 6 minutes
- Country: United States
- Language: English

You're Not Built That Way is a 1936 American animated short film starring Betty Boop and featuring Pudgy the Puppy. It was produced by Fleischer Studios.

== Plot summary ==
Pudgy the Puppy, out for a stroll, meets a mean bulldog. Impressed by the tough dog, Pudgy imitates his behavior. Betty, seeing this, sings the title song to Pudgy in an attempt to stop this. Pudgy ignores her and follows the bulldog, but his attempts to be tough only land him in trouble. After an attempt to steal a meal from the butcher nearly gets him skewered, Pudgy runs back to Betty, who welcomes him home.

== Production notes ==
The short makes use of Fleischer's multiplane camera to film the backgrounds.
