= Making Friends (film) =

- Directed by: Dave Fleischer
- Produced by: Max Fleischer
- Starring: Mae Questel
- Music by: Sammy Timberg (uncredited)
- Animation by: Hicks Lokey; Myron Waldman
- Color process: Black-and-white
- Distributed by: Paramount Pictures
- Release date: December 18, 1936
- Running time: 7 minutes
- Country: United States
- Language: English

Making Friends is a 1936 Fleischer Studios animated short film starring Betty Boop.

== Synopsis ==
Pudgy the Pup takes Betty Boop's advice ('Go Out and Make Friends With the World') to heart and befriends various wild animals.
