= Not Now (film) =

- Directed by: Dave Fleischer
- Produced by: Max Fleischer; Adolph Zukor
- Starring: Mae Questel; Jack Mercer
- Animation by: Hicks Lokey; Myron Waldman
- Color process: Black-and-white
- Production company: Fleischer Studios
- Distributed by: Paramount Pictures
- Release date: February 28, 1936
- Running time: 7 minutes
- Country: United States
- Language: English

Not Now (originally titled as Pudgy in "Not Now") is a 1936 Fleischer Studios animated short film starring Betty Boop and Pudgy the Pup. It is now in public domain.

== Synopsis ==
A noisy, caterwauling cat is preventing Betty Boop from getting any sleep at night. When Betty asks the cat to stop, it replies "not ne-ow". Pudgy tries to chase the cat away, and after much trouble, he seemingly succeeds. That is, until all the cats in the neighborhood appear outside Betty's window.
