= Betty Boop's Little Pal =

1934 animated film

- Directed by: Dave Fleischer
- Produced by: Max Fleischer
- Starring: Mae Questel
- Animation by: Edward Nolan; Myron Waldman
- Color process: Black-and-white
- Production company: Fleischer Studios
- Distributed by: Paramount Publix Corporation
- Release date: September 21, 1934
- Running time: 7 minutes
- Country: United States
- Language: English

Betty Boop's Little Pal is a 1934 Fleischer Studios animated short film starring Betty Boop, and featuring Pudgy the Puppy (in his first appearance).

== Plot ==
Betty and her puppy Pudgy are on a picnic, but find it hard to enjoy the day when Pudgy ruins it and is sent home. Meanwhile, a dogcatcher is intent on capturing Pudgy, but the other dogs in the catcher's cage manage to escape him, and soon the two are reunited happily.

== Notes ==
- This is the last Betty Boop cartoon in which Betty wears her famous flapper suit.
- This is the first time Betty spanks Pudgy for punishment.
- Clips of the redrawn colorized version were used in the compilation movie Betty Boop For President: The Movie (1980).
