= Stop That Noise =

Betty Boop in Stop That Noise
- Directed by: Dave Fleischer
- Produced by: Max Fleischer
- Starring: Mae Questel
- Animation by: Edward Nolan; Myron Waldman
- Color process: Black-and-white
- Production company: Fleischer Studios
- Distributed by: Paramount Pictures
- Release date: March 15, 1935
- Running time: 7 minutes
- Country: United States
- Language: English

Stop That Noise is a 1935 Fleischer Studios animated short film starring Betty Boop.

== Synopsis ==
A sleepless Betty can't take the noise of the city anymore, and heads out into the country for some peace and quiet. She soon discovers that the country has its own problems, such as noisy ducks and irritable insects. In the end, Betty returns to her apartment and happily falls asleep amidst the sounds of the city.

== Availability ==
- Olive Films released this officially in Betty Boop: The Essential Collection: Volume 3.
