= Training Pigeons =

- Directed by: Dave Fleischer
- Produced by: Max Fleischer
- Starring: Mae Questel
- Music by: Sammy Timberg (uncredited)
- Animation by: Edward Nolan; Myron Waldman
- Color process: Black-and-white
- Production company: Fleischer Studios
- Distributed by: Paramount Pictures
- Release date: September 18, 1936
- Running time: 6 minutes
- Country: United States
- Language: English

Training Pigeons is a 1936 Fleischer Studios animated short film featuring Betty Boop and Pudgy the Pup.

== Plot summary ==
Betty and Pudgy are on the roof of their tenement building, trying to get her pet pigeons back in their cage. One stubborn bird refuses to return to the roost, despite Betty's pleas. Pudgy, imagining himself a might hunting dog, attempts to catch the bird, with little success (at one point, Pudgy spots the pigeon on top of a flag pole, and as he tries to climb up the pole, the flag spanks Pudgy). When the pigeon gives Pudgy the slip, the little dog eventually wanders into the forest, where he falls asleep from exhaustion. The pigeon takes pity on Pudgy, and flies him back to Betty's home. When Pudgy wakes up on the roof, he tears up the picture of the hunting dog in frustration.
