= The Kids in the Shoe =

1935 animated film

The Kids in the Shoe is a 1935 short animated film produced by Max Fleischer. It is a humorous retelling of the classic nursery rhyme, There Was an Old Woman Who Lived in a Shoe. This short film was released on May 19, 1935, as part of the Color Classics collection.

== Synopsis ==
In the shoe, the woman and her children are shown on their daily lives. All of the children look identical with the exception of the youngest child, whom the woman tends to personally. It is shown that the children are rebellious by nature, purposefully giving their meals to the cat and avoiding their combing and tooth brushing. "You didn't eat your broth and you didn't eat your bread, so go ahead and brush and hurry into bed!" yells the woman to the kids.

After the children are sent to sleep, they begin a rowdy song and the situation becomes happy but highly chaotic. The woman later wakes up and threatens them to feed them castor oil if they don't go to sleep, which they happily comply with.

The woman reveals that the castor oil was simply apple cider which she energetically drinks as the cartoon comes to an end.

== Cast ==
- Smiley Burnette as Kid (singing voice) (uncredited)
- Mae Questel as Woman / Children
