= The Foxy Hunter =

- Directed by: Dave Fleischer
- Produced by: Max Fleischer
- Starring: Mae Questel
- Animation by: Thomas Johnson; Harold Walker
- Color process: Black-and-white
- Production company: Fleischer Studios
- Distributed by: Paramount Pictures
- Release date: November 26, 1937
- Running time: 8 minutes
- Country: United States
- Language: English

The Foxy Hunter is a 1937 Fleischer Studios animated short film starring Betty Boop, her nephew Junior and Pudgy the Puppy. All three characters are voiced by Mae Questel.

== Synopsis ==
Junior and Pudgy slip away from Betty Boop's care to go hunting with a pop-gun. The small woodland creatures don't take kindly to this and beat them up. They high tail it back to Betty Boop's house. A mother duck follows them in and Betty holds them down as the duck spanks them.
