= Taking the Blame =

- Directed by: Dave Fleischer
- Produced by: Max Fleischer
- Starring: Mae Questel
- Animation by: Hicks Lokey; Myron Waldman
- Color process: Black-and-white
- Production company: Fleischer Studios
- Distributed by: Paramount Pictures
- Release date: February 15, 1935
- Running time: 6 minutes
- Country: United States
- Language: English

Taking The Blame is a 1935 Fleischer Studios animated short film starring Betty Boop and featuring Pudgy the Puppy.

== Synopsis ==
Betty brings home a black cat as a playmate for her pet puppy, Pudgy. The cat, who quickly reveals himself as mean, greedy and manipulative, manages to get Pudgy blamed for all his misbehavior, including knocking over flower vases, eating chocolates, etc. Betty puts Pudgy outside due to the cat's behavior, but when she comes back into the house, she discovers the cat's true colors when she finds him eating all of the fish in her refrigerator. Betty chases the cat with a broom, breaking windows, ceiling lights and pictures in the process before the cat turns vicious and attempts to menace Betty. When Pudgy manages to re-enter the home, he rescues Betty by trapping the cat's tail in a mouse trap, causing the cat to run into Pudgy's doghouse in panic. When Pudgy puts jail bars on the entry into the doghouse, Betty puts a "For Sale" sign on it and gives Pudgy love.
