= Little Nobody (film) =

- Directed by: Dave Fleischer
- Produced by: Max Fleischer; Adolph Zukor
- Starring: Mae Questel
- Music by: Sammy Timberg
- Color process: Black-and-white
- Production company: Fleischer Studios
- Distributed by: Paramount Pictures
- Release date: December 27, 1935
- Running time: 7 minutes
- Country: United States
- Language: English

Little Nobody is a 1935 Fleischer Studios animated short film starring Betty Boop, and featuring Pudgy the Puppy.

== Synopsis ==
Betty's puppy Pudgy is infatuated with the cute dog next door, but is crushed when the dog's owner refers to him as a "little nobody." Betty cheers up her pet by singing "Every Little Nobody is Somebody." Pudgy later proves this when he rescues his doggie love from a waterfall.
