= Little Swee'Pea =

- Directed by: Dave Fleischer
- Produced by: Max Fleischer; Adolph Zukor
- Starring: Jack Mercer (Popeye); Mae Questel (Olive Oyl / Swee’ Pea); Gus Wickie (Alligator / Elephant / Hippo)
- Music by: Sammy Timberg (uncredited)
- Animation by: Seymour Kneitel; William Henning; Roland Crandall (uncredited)
- Color process: Black-and-white
- Production company: Fleischer Studios
- Distributed by: Paramount Pictures
- Release date: September 25, 1936
- Running time: 7:07
- Language: English

Little Swee'Pea (titled onscreen as Popeye the Sailor with Little Swee'Pea) is a 1936 American animated short film, released September 25, 1936 and featuring Popeye.

== Summary ==
Popeye visits Olive Oyl, who is too busy to spend the day with him. Instead, she offers Swee'Pea as a companion instead. As an agreeable Popeye exits with Swee'Pea and carriage, he does not notice Swee'Pea's crawling out of his transport and following his protector on all fours: stunned when he does notice the baby's absence, he calls out, turning just as the little fellow escapes his view to return to his provenance. Relieved to see his charge returned, Popeye continues pushing the carriage past the gates of the zoo, along whose promenade Swee'Pea repeats his naughty trick, imitating Popeye's manner in his crawl, but all too pleased now to leave his watcher behind; giggling, he makes his way to the elephant's domain, teasing the elephant close to the bars of his cage with a discarded peanut. Swee'Pea has the elephant's trunk and, raised high aloft, the alluring legume in his evasive fingers, he lets the peanut down the trunk at last, sliding backwards along the elephant's back as he does so, chuckling the while and plumping at last on the dirt.

Popeye, who looks down again and, in precisely the same way as before, notices that the baby has gone, more astonished this time to find that turning about and calling has not returned him magically to the cart. For Swee'Pea is now traipsing about the elephant, deftly avoiding its great, lumbering feet. Popeye scours the carriage, umbrella and all, finally catching sight of the boy as he tucks his head between his legs; as his entire form revolves in the direction of the cage, he calls out. Over by the elephant and scolding the wayward infant, Popeye slips through the bars of the cage: Swee'Pea merrily and swiftly crawls off, and the behemoth's trunk seizes the seething seaman. Twice the elephant wraps Popeye in trunk, quickly spinning the sailor out and into the iron bars of his confines. Ever in the fighting vein, Popeye begins a tug of war with the elephant; Swee'Pea, meanwhile, is playing with an alligator, crossing its open jaws just before they snap shut. Victory for Popeye as he flings the elephant's untold tons off to the side, taunting the astounded beast as he catches sight of the new scene. Again running after the baby, Popeye's backside is caught in the jaws of Swee'Pea's playmate just as the baby finishes another crossing. The reptile flings his would-be prey through the air and advances as the sailor makes land. "All right, zipper-mouth, you asked for it!" Man and beast tussle, Popeye prevailing, it seems, when he has his rival stretched out flat on its back: gently, he rubs its belly, intoning a lullaby. But this gentleness gives way, and a too-satisfied Popeye steps on the crocodile's slumbering form as he heads for Swee'Pea. Awakened, the beast is ripe for revenge: again they tussle, but though the sailor's brawny arms resist the foe, his exposed midsection falls to the beast's massaging hand, his ears to a grunted lullaby. The creature picks up Popeye with his tail and with a mighty flip sends him again through the air and into the cage of the hippopotamus

Groggy, the sailor calls out to his charge, whom we find reclining on his elbow in the great maw of the happy hippo, tickling the beast's hard palate with a feather. Again, Popeye makes a snatch for the child, but he slips past him, and the angered beast shunts the sailor away with a thrust of his huge snout. His pipe whirling about in surprise, Popeye screws up his courage again and marches toward the hippo, who once again sends his opponent flying into the bars—and again. Dazed and maddened, Popeye gulps down the remainder of an open can of spinach withdrawn from his breast-pocket. Quivering with new-found might, hard as a wall of brick, the solid sailor effortlessly resists the onslaught of the charging river horse. Popeye lifts the defeated beast high in the air and with a great, earth-shattering throw leaves him in a crater.

Swee'Pea dashes by on a leopard's back, and the chase begins, the hippo's bars bending at Popeye's mad sprint. The sailor man strokes his way to the wildcat's hind, and, grasping his tail, pulls the mount out from under his rider, who falls safe and smiling to the sidewalk in front of Olive Oyl's house as his protector flings the leopard off and into a fence with such force that he drops to the ground senseless and spotless. Popeye carries Swee'Pea to Olive's door, and, setting him on the steps, presents a little toy monkey to the boy as an alternative to playing with real animals. The toy frightens Swee'Pea and he begins to cry just Olive emerges. Seeing Swee'Pea in such straits, Olive angrily beats Popeye off with her broom before withdrawing. The short ends with Popeye singing why he won't have babies.

== Production notes ==
Little Swee'Pea makes use of the Fleischers' stereoptical process, by which modeled sets provide three-dimensional backgrounds for the action of the film. The short is in the public domain in the United States.

A version of this film was released by Cartoon Renewal Studios in 2021, enhanced by an artificial intelligence system, colorized and upscaled to 1080 HD.
