= Happy You and Merry Me =

- Directed by: Dave Fleischer
- Story by: Dave Fleischer; Isadore Sparber (all uncredited)
- Produced by: Max Fleischer
- Starring: Mae Questel
- Music by: Sammy Timberg (uncredited)
- Animation by: Willard Bowsky; George Germanetti; Orestes Calpini (unc.); Graham Place (unc.); Dick Marion (unc.); Jack Ozark (unc.)
- Color process: Black-and-white
- Production company: Fleischer Studios
- Distributed by: Paramount Pictures
- Release date: August 21, 1936
- Running time: 6 minutes
- Country: United States
- Language: English

Happy You and Merry Me is a 1936 Fleischer Studios animated short film featuring Betty Boop and Pudgy the Puppy.

== Plot summary ==
A stray kitten called Myron wanders into Betty Boop's house, gets sick on candy, and is cured with catnip by Betty and Pudgy the Pup.
