= Thrills and Chills =

- Directed by: Dave Fleischer
- Produced by: Max Fleischer
- Starring: Margie Hines
- Animation by: Thomas Johnson; Harold Walker
- Color process: Black-and-white
- Distributed by: Paramount Pictures
- Release date: December 23, 1938
- Running time: 7 minutes
- Country: United States
- Language: English

Thrills and Chills is a 1938 Fleischer Studios animated short film starring Betty Boop.

== Premise ==
Betty Boop and Pudgy take the train to a ski resort and find themselves being swept away over a waterfall. They get rescued by an amorous moron.
