= The Swing School =

1938 film by Dave Fleischer

Betty Boop in the Swing School
- Directed by: Dave Fleischer; Thomas Johnson (animation)
- Produced by: Max Fleischer; Adolph Zukor
- Starring: Bonnie Poe; Frances Reynolds
- Music by: Sammy Timberg
- Animation by: Thomas Johnson; Frank Endres
- Color process: Black and white
- Production company: Fleischer Studios
- Distributed by: Paramount Pictures
- Release date: May 27, 1938
- Running time: 7 minutes
- Country: United States
- Language: English

The Swing School is a 1938 Fleischer Studios animated short film directed by Dave Fleischer and starring Betty Boop.

== Synopsis ==
At Betty Boop's Music School for Animals, Pudgy the dog doesn't do so well, but the puppy love triumphs.
