= Be Up to Date =

- Directed by: Dave Fleischer
- Produced by: Max Fleischer (producer); S. Roy Luby (associate producer)
- Starring: Mae Questel
- Animation by: Thomas Johnson; Harold Walker
- Color process: Black-and-white
- Production company: Fleischer Studios
- Distributed by: Paramount Pictures
- Release date: February 25, 1938
- Running time: 7 mins
- Language: English

Be Up to Date is a 1938 Betty Boop animated short film.

== Plot ==
Betty Boop's Traveling Department Store comes to Hillbillyville; the mountain folks find old uses for the new gadgets, such as using a waffle iron for ironing hair, or playing music, in which Betty joins in on the fun.

== Notes ==
This is the last theatrical short subject cartoon in which Mae Questel voiced Betty. After this cartoon, other people would provide Betty's voice.
