= Minding the Baby =

1931 film

- Directed by: Dave Fleischer
- Produced by: Max Fleischer
- Starring: Margie Hines
- Production company: Fleischer Studios
- Distributed by: Paramount Pictures
- Release date: September 28, 1931
- Running time: 7 minutes
- Country: United States
- Language: English

Minding the Baby is a 1931 Fleischer Studios Talkartoon animated short film starring Betty Boop and Bimbo.

== Synopsis ==
Bimbo's mom has fallen out with her husband and has had an affair with the ice man. Bimbo's mother goes shopping and leaves Bimbo in charge of his baby brother, Aloysius. Betty Boop wants Bimbo to come over to her house to play. Bimbo then sneaks over to Betty's. Aloysius misbehaves while Bimbo is over at Betty's apartment. Aloysius then uses a vacuum cleaner and vacuums Betty and Bimbo from next door and his mother from off the street. Bimbo's mother is furious, as Betty, Bimbo and Aloysius hide behind a chair in Bimbo's apartment. Aloysius starts to cry, Bimbo then zips his brother's mouth shut.

== Censorship ==
Before the film could be released in Kansas, the Kansas Board of Review required the elimination of a scene where Bimbo rocks the baby's cradle, due to "closeups showing stomach and navel accentuated."
