= A Date to Skate =

- Directed by: Dave Fleischer
- Produced by: Max Fleischer; Adolph Zukor
- Starring: Jack Mercer; Mae Questel
- Animation by: Willard Bowsky; Orestes Calpini
- Color process: Black-and-white
- Production company: Fleischer Studios
- Distributed by: Paramount Pictures
- Release date: November 18, 1938 (United States)
- Running time: 7:15
- Language: English

A Date to Skate is an American animated short film, released on November 18, 1938 and starring Jack Mercer as the voice of Popeye.

== Summary ==
The full short

Popeye and Olive Oyl stroll happily along when Popeye catches sight of a roller rink: The Declares read "Good Skates 50 cents, Cheap Skates 25 cents." Asked to go skating, Olive protests that she does not know how; However, Popeye tells Olive that he will teach her! Inside the rink, the Attendant asks Popeye what size of skates he wishes to rent. Popeye tells Olive to "Make a fist" so the attendant Attendant can measure it. ("A hand like a foot and a half," he mutters, deftly wrapping a skate about the Lady's great clenched hand.) Popeye hammers the long, slender skates with his fists to the bottom of Olive's shoes; she falls over a couple of times as Popeye delicately slips on his own. They go to the rink and Popeye, swinging his arms as if he's rowing a canoe, gracefully demonstrates the proper technique; Olive attempts to move, but can only kick the air and flap her skinny arms as she falls headfirst into the railing around the rink. She frees her head by her own strength, but her feet become stuck in the same way as a result: with a struggle, one foot is freed, and an exasperated Olive is helped by Popeye, who gently releases the other foot and dusts off his indignant companion (adept enough to tap her foot impatiently), and he points out all of the other Skaters roller skating joyously.

Olive's hands inconveniently obscures Popeye's eyes when they step out together; as they inch forward, Popeye is caught on a Faster Skater and falls over, leaving Olive to fend for herself. She manages to stop but then goes and falls on her behind. Popeye glides over, stands her up, and offers another demonstration, his muscled arms again so like a sailor's, his hands being at his hips first, then clasped behind his back, and then above his head. He motions for Olive to take the floor again; more confident somehow, she agrees, and seems at last to have a sense of the movement needed. But she stumbles, knocks over another Skater, and falls on her front, blowing her hat's drooping daisy out of her face. Popeye slides Olive up in front of him, pushing her by the back as they roll along; he stomps and bids her do the same, and they seem to be having a pleasant time of their outing until Popeye lets go again. As Olive stumbles and flails about, Popeye chases her while holding a pillow. Olive grasps a pillar for momentary relief, but her legs splay about as she tries to exit the rink; Popeye crashes into her and the force shoots Olive out the door and off the rink. She catches a street lamp and, swinging about the pole, flings herself down the sidewalk; Popeye emerges with the pillow still in his hand; Olive flies along and is stopped by a Trolley emerging from an opening cellar door. Suspended on the arms of the Trolley, Olive unwittingly makes a path for Popeye.

Popeye speeds into the Trolley and Olive rolls out into the busy street, falling on her face in the midst of traffic. Popeye notices that Olive is well behind him and turns around just as he is about to fly off a short, wooden dock. Olive tries to stand as a Car taps her rear end and sends her soaring into the revolving door of the "Lacy and Co." department store, which sends a Heavy-Set Lady flying out the door and her packages out of her hands and into the air. Olive rolls into a crowded elevator just as it closes; up it goes, and out she rolls. She then slips and rolls under a long table bedecked with tableware and down a long ramp. Popeye stands outside the store as the same Lady already collects her things; just as the Lady is about to cap her tower of boxes, Olive knocks her down again. Olive is in traffic again, supported by a Crossing Guard's rotating sign: STOP! GO! STOP! GO!--and the Drivers too willingly follow every instruction! Olive is ejected into a left turn and begins to collect herself as she is caught by a passing Firetruck. Popeye catches sight of Olive as the Truck thunders along. Popeye searches for his can of spinach: "I must be getting old," he mutters. "Now don't tell me I left it at home!" A Helpful Person in the shadowy house pitches a handy can of the miracle-vegetable to Popeye, who gulps it down without a moment to spare. Popeye then charges forward, over a car (whose Stunned Driver crashes into Another Person's car), under a truck, over another car, and ducking under several other automobiles. A panicked Olive Oyl unwillingly braves death: the Firetruck makes a left turn and Olive is flung down a great hill; her arms flail as she skirts passing vehicles. Popeye follows, still in control. There is a hump and a fork in the road of which Olive & Popeye take opposite paths, reuniting in a crash at the end: Olive is flung into the air and lands in her beau's mighty hands. She wants to go skating again, singing, "My heart's palpitatin' whenever I'm skatin' with Popeye the Sailor Man!"

== Production notes ==
A Date to Skate is the last cartoon made by Dave and Max Fleischer at their studio in New York City, New York and the last Fleischer cartoon to feature Mae Questel as the voice of Olive Oyl. Hereafter and until the demise of the Fleischers' studio, Popeye's shorts would be animated in Miami, Florida, and Margie Hines would be the voice of Olive until Mae Questel's return in 1944. The cartoon is in the public domain in the United States.
