= Pudgy the Watchman =

Pudgy and the Watchman
- Directed by: Dave Fleischer; Animation Director: Thomas Johnson (uncr.)
- Produced by: Max Fleischer
- Starring: Kate Wright
- Animation by: Thomas Johnson; Harold Walker; Tony DiPaola (uncr.); Frank Endres (uncr.); Otto Feuer (uncr.)
- Color process: Black-and-white
- Production company: Fleischer Studios
- Distributed by: Paramount Pictures
- Release date: August 12, 1938
- Running time: 7 mins
- Language: English

Pudgy the Watchman is a 1938 Fleischer Studios animated short film starring Betty Boop and Pudgy the Pup.

== Synopsis ==
Betty Boop hires a feline professional "Mouse Eradicator" Mr. Al E. Katz to solve her rodent woes because Pudgy isn't doing his job. But after initial successes, Mr. Al E. Katz gets drunk on the job. Betty is relieved to have Pudgy throw Katz out the window.
