= We Did It (film) =

1936 film by Dave Fleischer

- Directed by: Dave Fleischer
- Story by: William Gilmartin (unc.); Warren Foster; Joe Stultz; Bill Turner
- Produced by: Max Fleischer; Adolph Zukor
- Starring: Mae Questel
- Music by: Sammy Timberg; Bob Rothberg (uncredited)
- Animation by: Willard Bowsky; George Germanetti; Edward Nolan (unc.); Orestes Calpini (unc.); Lod Rossner (unc.)
- Color process: Black-and-white
- Production company: Fleischer Studios
- Distributed by: Paramount Pictures
- Release date: April 24, 1936
- Running time: 6 minutes
- Country: United States
- Language: English

We Did It is a 1936 Fleischer Studio animated short film, starring Betty Boop, and featuring Pudgy the Pup.

== Synopsis ==
Betty leaves her pet Pudgy home alone with three adorable little kittens. As soon as Betty is out the door, the kittens begin to make mischief, turning the house into shambles. When Betty returns, she assumes the damage was caused by Pudgy, and punishes the innocent pup. The guilty kittens emerge from hiding and confess by singing the title song. A contrite Betty apologizes to Pudgy, and gives him a big bowl of ice cream shaped like a mountain.
