= Hicks Lokey =

American animator

William "Hicks" Lokey (April 5, 1904 – November 4, 1990) was an American animator. He is best known for his work at Fleischer Studios.

Lokey was born in Alabama. He spent his early years in the animation industry at Van Beuren Studios, animating Aesop's Film Fables during the 1920s. Starting in 1934, he worked as an animator for Fleischer Studios. One of his first works there was the Betty Boop short There's Something About a Soldier.

He was one of the senior animators who took part in the 1937 Fleischer Studios strike, hoping to negotiate wages and working hours with Max and Dave Fleischer. However, after the Fleischers threatened to reduce Lokey's and others pay, Lokey opted to return to work. After leaving Fleischers in 1938, Lokey joined the Walter Lantz Studio, where he worked until 1939.

Lokey was hired by Walt Disney Productions the following year, where he provided character animation for the "Pink Elephants on Parade" segment in Dumbo and "The Dance of the Hours" in Fantasia. Lokey left the Disney studio in 1941 after joining several animators in the Disney animators' strike. In the meantime, Lokey decided to go join the Metro-Goldwyn-Mayer cartoon studio for some uncredited work on their cartoons. The notable shorts he animated on were Tex Avery's Slap Happy Lion and The Cat That Hated People, as well as the Tom and Jerry short, The Zoot Cat.

After a stint at Paul Fennell, he found employment at Hanna-Barbera in 1959, where he would remain for nearly thirty years. Lokey continued to animate, working on the television series Goober and the Ghost Chasers and The New Shmoo and the feature film The Man Called Flintstone (1966). Lokey retired in 1986.

In 1990 Lokey received the Winsor McCay Award for his lifetime of work in the field of animation. Lokey died in Los Angeles on November 4, 1990.
