= Myron Waldman =

American animator (1908–2006)

- Born: April 23, 1908; Brooklyn, New York, U.S.
- Died: February 6, 2006 (aged 97); Bethpage, New York, U.S

Myron Waldman (April 23, 1908 – February 4, 2006) was an American animator, best known for his work at Fleischer Studios.

== Early life ==
Waldman was born in Brooklyn, New York on April 23, 1908. He was a graduate of the Pratt Institute, where he majored in Art.

== Career ==
Waldman started his first work in 1930 at Fleischer Studio. At Fleischer he worked on Betty Boop, Raggedy Ann, Gulliver's Travels, the animated adaptations of Superman, and Popeye. He was head animator on two Academy Award-nominated shorts, Educated Fish (1937) and Hunky and Spunky (1939).

Waldman made the transition when Fleischer Studios was acquired by Paramount Pictures and reorganized as Famous Studios in 1942. At Famous he worked mostly on the Casper the Friendly Ghost series.

Waldman served three years in the U.S. Army (1939-1942).

In 1943, Waldman partnered with writer Steve Carlin to produce the Happy the Humbug comic strip.

In 1943, his wordless novel, Eve: A Pictorial Love Story was a critical success.

In 1957, he left Famous to become an animation director at Hal Seeger Productions where he worked on the revival of the Out of the Inkwell series, as well as Milton the Monster, until his retirement in 1968.

In 1986, Waldman received the Motion Picture Screen Cartoonists Award, and in 1997 was given the Winsor McCay Award for his lifetime work in the field of animation.

Waldman made limited edition cel, drawing characters on which he worked, Betty Boop, Popeye and Superman.

== Personal life ==
Waldman met his wife, Rosalie, when she was an animation checker at the Fleischer Studio in the early 1940s, and had two sons, Robert and Steve. Waldman died of congestive heart failure on February 4, 2006, at the age of 97 at a hospital in Bethpage, New York.

== Filmography (As head animator) ==
- 1961: Cape Kidnaveral
- 1960: The Planet Mouseola with Jack Ehret
- 1958: Spook and Span with Wm.B. Pattengill
- 1957: Ice Scream with Nick Tafuri
- 1957: Ghost of Honor with Nick Tafuri
- 1957: Peakaboo with Nick Tafuri
- 1957: Hooky Spooky with Nick Tafuri
- 1957: Spooking About Africa with Nick Tafuri
- 1956: Line of Screammage with Nick Tafuri
- 1956: Dutch Treat with Nick Tafuri
- 1955: Red White and Boo with Nick Tafuri
- 1955: Bull Fright with Nick Tafuri
- 1955: Spooking with a Brouge with Nick Tafuri
- 1955: Keep Your Grin Up with Nick Tafuri
- 1955: Hide and Shriek with Nick Tafuri
- 1954: Boo Ribbon Winner with Nick Tafuri
- 1954: Boos and Arrows with Nick Tafuri
- 1954: The Oily Bird with Gordon Whittier
- 1954: Puss 'n Boos with Nick Tafuri
- 1954: Zero the Hero with Larry Silverman
- 1954: Boo Moon with Nick Tafuri, Larry Silverman, Gordon Whittier
- 1953: Boos and Saddles with Larry Silverman
- 1953: Do or Diet with Nick Tafuri
- 1953: Little Boo Peep with Larry Silverman
- 1953: Herman the Catoonist with Larry Silverman
- 1953: By the Old Mill Scream with Nick Tafuri
- 1953: Winner by a Hare with Tom Golden
- 1953: Spook No Evil with Nick Tafuri
- 1953: Frightday the Thirteenth with Larry Silverman
- 1952: Feast and Furious with Gordon Whittier
- 1952: Forest Fantasy with Larry Silverman
- 1952: Cape Fright with Nick Tafuri
- 1952: Spunky Skunky with Larry Silverman
- 1954: Dizzy Dinosaurs with Gordon Whittier
- 1952: The Deep Boo Sea with Nick Tafuri
- 1951: Casper takes a Bow-Wow with Larry Silverman
- 1951: Vegetable Vaudeville with Nick Tafuri
- 1951: Casper Comes to Clown with Gordon Whittier, Larry Silverman
- 1951: Boo Scout with Nick Tafuri
- 1951: Too Boo or Not to Boo with Larry Silverman
- 1951: Miners Forty-Niners with Larry Silverman
- 1951: Mississippi River with Gordon Whittier
- 1950: Once Upon a Rhyme with Larry Silverman
- 1950: Fresh Yeggs with Nick Tafuri
- 1950: Fiesta Time with Larry Silverman
- 1950: Boos in the Nite with Nick Tafuri
- 1950: Pleased to Eat You with Wm.B. Pattengill
- 1950: Teacher's Pest with Gordon Whittier
- 1950: The Land of the Lost Jewels with Gordon Whittier
- 1949: Snow Foolin with Gordon Whittier
- 1949: The Big Drip with Nick Tafuri
- 1949: Strolling Thru the Park with Larry Silverman
- 1949: For Me and My Gal with Gordon Whittier
- 1949: Toys Will Be Toys with Gordon Whittier
- 1949: Spring Song with Larry Silverman
- 1949: A Haunting We Will Go with Irving Dressler
- 1949: ''The Little Cut-Up with George Whittier
- 1948: The Land of the Lost with Nick Tafuri
- 1948: There's Good Boos Tonight with Morey Reden, Nick Tafuri
- 1948: Flip Flap with Wm.B. Pattengill
- 1948: The Dog Show-Off with Gordon Whittier, Nick Tafuri, Irving Dressler, and Wm.B. Pattengill
- 1947: Santa's Surprise with Wm.B. Pattengill
- 1947: A Bout with a Trout with Gordon Whittier, Nick Tafuri, Irving Dressler, Wm.B. Pattengill
- 1947: Loose in a Caboose with Gordon Whittier, Nick Tafuri, Irving Dressler, Wm.B. Pattengill
- 1947: Musica-Lulu with Gordon Whittier, Nick Tafuri, Irving Dressler
- 1943: The Mummy Strikes with Graham Place
- 1942: Japoteurs with Nick Tafuri
- 1942: The Magnetic Telescope with Tom Moore
- 1942: Billion Dollar Limited with Frank Endres
- 1941: Mr. Bug Goes to Town (sequence director)
- 1941: Twinkletoes in Hat Stuff with Sam Stimson
- 1941: Copy Cat with William Henning
- 1941: Popeye Meets Rip Van Winkle with Sidney Pillet
- 1941: Raggedy Ann and Andy with Joe Oriolo, William Henning, Arnold Gillespie
- 1941: Problem Pappy with Sidney Pillet
- 1940: Springtime in the Rockage with Dick Williams
- 1940: You Can't Shoe a Horsefly with Sam Stimson
- 1940: Ants in the Plants with George Moreno
- 1939: Rhythm on the Reservation with Graham Place
- 1939: The Barnyard Brat with Tony Pabian
- 1938: The Playful Polar Bears with Graham Place
- 1938: All's Fair at the Fair with Graham Place
- 1938: Hunky and Spunky with Graham Place
- 1938: The Lost Kitten with Lillian Friedman
- 1938: Honest Love and True with Lillian Friedman
- 1938: Riding the Rail with Hicks Lokey
- 1937: Educated Fish with Hicks Lokey
- 1937: The New Deal Show with Hicks Lokey
- 1937: The Candid Candidate with Lillian Friedman
- 1937: Peeping Penguins with Hicks Lokey
- 1937: Pudgy Picks a Fight! with Hicks Lokey
- 1937: Pudgy Takes a Bow-Wow with Lillian Friedman
- 1937: Bunny Mooning with Edward Nolan
- 1936: Making Friends with Hicks Lokey
- 1936: Be Human with Lillian Friedman
- 1936: Training Pigeons with Edward Nolan
- 1936: Hawaiian Birds with Sam Stimson
- 1936: You're Not Built that Way with Hicks Lokey
- 1936: Betty Boop and Little Jimmy with Hicks Lokey
- 1936: Not Now with Hicks Lokey
- 1936: Betty Boop and the Little King with Hicks Lokey
- 1935: Henry the Funniest Living American with Sam Stimson
- 1935: Making Stars with Edward Nolan
- 1935: No! No! A Thousand Times No!! with Edward Nolan
- 1935: Stop that Noise with Edward Nolan
- 1935: Taking the Blame with Hicks Lokey
- 1935: A Little Soap and Water with Edward Nolan
- 1935: A Language All My Own with Hicks Lokey
- 1935: Judge for a Day with Hicks Lokey
- 1935: Baby Be Good with Edward Nolan
- 1934: When My Ship Comes In with Hicks Lokey
- 1934: Keep in Style with Edward Nolan
- 1934: Betty Boop's Prize Show with Lillian Friedman
- 1934: Betty Boop's Little Pal with Edward Nolan
- 1934: There's Something about a Soldier with Edward Nolan
- 1934: Love thy Neighbor with Edward Nolan
- 1934: Betty Boop's Trial with Hicks Lokey
- 1934: This Little Piggie Went to Market (uncredited)
- 1934: Can You Take It? with Tom Johnson
- 1934: Let's All Sing Like the Birdies Sing with Tom Johnson

== Filmography (As animator) ==
- 1985: See & Sing: Christmas Favorites
- 1985: See & Sing: Songs of America
- 1985: See & Sing: Silly Songs
- 1985: See & Sing: All-Time Favorites
- 1967: Batfink – This is Your Life
- 1967: Father Time Bomb
- 1967: Ego A-Go-Go
- 1967: Blankenstein
- 1967: The Copycat Bat
- 1967: Unhappy Birthday
- 1967: Hugo the Crimefighter
- 1967: Double Double Crossers
- 1967: Backwards Box
- 1967: Robber Hood
- 1967: The Kangarobot
- 1967: Topsy Turvy
- 1967: The Beep Booper
- 1967: Goldstinger
- 1967: Take Indian Taker
- 1967: The Mark of Zero
- 1967: Spin the Batfink
- 1967: A Living Doll
- 1967: Go Fly a Bat
- 1967: Myron the Magician
- 1967: The Dirty Stinker
- 1967: Nuts of the Round Table
- 1967: The Sonic Boomer
- 1967: Ebenezer the Freezer
- 1966: The Short Circuit Case
- 1963: Boy Pest With Osh
- 1939: Gulliver's Travels (uncredited)
- 1933: Betty Boop's Hallowe'en Party with Willard Bowsky
- 1933: I Like Mountain Music with Willard Bowsky
- 1933: I Heard with Willard Bowsky
- 1933: Boilesk with Willard Bowsky
- 1933: Betty Boop's Birthday Party with Seymour Kneitel
- 1933: Popular Melodies with Willard Bowsky
- 1932: Sing a Song with Seymour Kneitel
- 1932: Wait Till the Sun Shines, Nellie with Seymour Kneitel
- 1931: By the Light of the Silvery Moon with Seymour Kneitel

=== Wordless Novels ===
- Eve. Published by Stephen Daye, NY, 1943
- Eve: A Pictorial Love Story. Commemorative Edition published by Toon Art Inc. 1997.
- Eve. The Comics Journal #299 (August 2009)

== Filmography (As self) ==
- 1995: Betty Boop: Queen of the Cartoons A&E Biography
- 2008: Directing the Sailor: The Art of Myron Waldman (7:21)

== Works cited ==
- Beronä, David A. (2008). Wordless Books: The Original Graphic Novels. Abrams Books. ISBN 978-0-8109-9469-0.
