= The Woody Woodpecker and Friends Classic Cartoon Collection =

DVD collection by Universal Pictures

The Woody Woodpecker and Friends Classic Cartoon Collection is a three-disc DVD collection of theatrical cartoons produced by Walter Lantz Productions for Universal Pictures between 1930 and 1958. The set was released by Universal Pictures Home Entertainment on July 24, 2007, and marks the first time a collection of cartoons starring Woody Woodpecker and the other Lantz characters have been widely available on home video (a previous fifteen-volume collection of Woody Woodpecker Show DVDs was made available for mail order through Columbia House in the early 2000s).

Included in the set are 75 cartoon shorts, including 45 cartoons featuring Woody Woodpecker and 30 other Universal cartoons including those featuring Oswald the Lucky Rabbit, Andy Panda, and Chilly Willy, and some Swing Symphonies.

A second collection was issued in 2008.

== DVD contents ==
=== Disc 1 ===
The first disc features Woody Woodpecker's first appearance in a cartoon and his first 14 cartoons after. It also includes five early-1930s Oswald cartoons and five miscellaneous cartoons including two with lesser-known characters and three based on early cartoon trends: celebrity caricatures (Toyland Premiere and Hollywood Bowl) and blackouts (Hysterical Highspots in American History).

#	Title	Co-stars	Year	Director	Series
1	Knock Knock	Papa, Woody Woodpecker	1940	Walter Lantz	Andy Panda
2	Woody Woodpecker	Dr. Horace N. Buddy	1941	Walter Lantz	Woody Woodpecker
3	The Screwdriver		1941	Walter Lantz	Woody Woodpecker
4	Pantry Panic	The Starvation, Korny Kat	1941	Walter Lantz	Woody Woodpecker
5	The Hollywood Matador	Oxnar the Terribull	1942	Alex Lovy	Woody Woodpecker
6	Ace in the Hole		1942	Alex Lovy	Woody Woodpecker
7	The Loan Stranger	Hudson C. Dann	1942	Alex Lovy	Woody Woodpecker
8	The Screwball		1943	Alex Lovy	Woody Woodpecker
9	The Dizzy Acrobat		1943	Alex Lovy	Woody Woodpecker
10	Ration Bored		1943	Emery Hawkins and Milt Schaffer	Woody Woodpecker
11	The Barber of Seville	Sitting Bull, Figaro	1944	James Culhane	Woody Woodpecker
12	The Beach Nut	Wally Walrus	1944	James Culhane	Woody Woodpecker
13	Ski for Two	Wally Walrus	1944	James Culhane	Woody Woodpecker
14	Chew-Chew Baby	Wally Walrus	1945	James Culhane	Woody Woodpecker
15	Woody Dines Out		1945	James Culhane	Woody Woodpecker
16	Hells Heels	Pete	1930	Walter Lantz	Oswald the Lucky Rabbit
17	Spooks	Ortensia the Cat, The Phantom of the Opera, Miss Hippo	1930	Walter Lantz	Oswald the Lucky Rabbit
18	Grandma's Pet	Ortensia the Cat	1932	Walter Lantz and Bill Nolan	Oswald the Lucky Rabbit
19	Confidence	Dr. Pill, Franklin D. Roosevelt	1933	Bill Nolan	Oswald the Lucky Rabbit
20	The Merry Old Soul	Paul Whiteman, Old King Cole, Cynical Susie	1933	Walter Lantz and Bill Nolan	Oswald the Lucky Rabbit
21	King Klunk	Poodles, King Klunk, Luna Goona, Cupid	1933	Walter Lantz	Pooch the Pup
22	Toyland Premiere	Oswald the Lucky Rabbit, Santa, Laurel and Hardy	1934	Walter Lantz	Cartune Classics
23	Hollywood Bowl		1938	Elmer Perkins	Cartune Comedies
24	Scrambled Eggs		1939	Alex Lovy	Peterkin
25	Hysterical Highspots in American History		1941	Walter Lantz	N/A

- Bonus features:
  - 1982 documentary short: Walter, Woody and the World of Animation
  - Vintage 1936 documentary short: Cartoonland Mysteries

=== Disc 2 ===
The second disc features Woody Woodpecker's next 14 cartoons after Woody Dines Out plus a guest appearance of him from the Musical Miniatures series. It also includes five Andy Panda cartoons including his first (Life Begins for Andy Panda) and last (Scrappy Birthday) and five Swing Symphonies with one having another of Woody Woodpecker's guest appearances.

#	Title	Co-stars	Year	Director	Series
1	The Dippy Diplomat	Wally Walrus	1945	James Culhane	Woody Woodpecker
2	The Loose Nut	Bull Dozer	1945	James Culhane	Woody Woodpecker
3	Who's Cookin' Who?	The Starvation, Wolfie	1946	James Culhane	Woody Woodpecker
4	Bathing Buddies	Wally Walrus	1946	Dick Lundy	Woody Woodpecker
5	The Reckless Driver	Wally Walrus	1946	James Culhane	Woody Woodpecker
6	Fair Weather Fiends	Wolfie	1946	James Culhane	Woody Woodpecker
7	Musical Moments from Chopin	Andy Panda, Woody Woodpecker	1947	Dick Lundy	Musical Miniatures
8	Smoked Hams	Wally Walrus	1947	Dick Lundy	Woody Woodpecker
9	The Coo Coo Bird		1947	Dick Lundy	Woody Woodpecker
10	Well Oiled	Wally Walrus, Andy Panda, Oswald the Lucky Rabbit	1947	Dick Lundy	Woody Woodpecker
11	Solid Ivory		1947	Dick Lundy	Woody Woodpecker
12	Woody the Giant Killer	Buck	1947	Dick Lundy	Woody Woodpecker
13	The Mad Hatter	Wally Walrus	1948	Dick Lundy	Woody Woodpecker
14	Banquet Busters	Andy Panda, Oswald the Lucky Rabbit, Mrs. Gloria van Glutton	1948	Dick Lundy	Woody Woodpecker
15	Wacky-Bye Baby	Wally Walrus	1948	Dick Lundy	Woody Woodpecker
16	Life Begins for Andy Panda	Papa, Permelia, Snuffy, Mr. Whippletree, Pygmy Panda Hunters, Walter Finchell	1939	Dick Lundy	Andy Panda
17	Fish Fry		1944	James Culhane	Andy Panda
18	Apple Andy		1946	Dick Lundy	Andy Panda
19	The Bandmaster	Count Bejerk	1947	Dick Lundy	Andy Panda
20	Scrappy Birthday	Miranda, Buck, Dizzy, J. Primrose Skunk	1949	Dick Lundy	Andy Panda
21	$21 a Day (Once a Month)	Woody Woodpecker, Andy Panda, Snuffy	1941	Walter Lantz	Swing Symphonies
22	Pass the Biscuits Mirandy!	Mirandy, Adolf Hitler, Benito Mussolini, Shōwa	1943	James Culhane	Swing Symphonies
23	The Greatest Man in Siam	Miss X, King of Siam	1944	James Culhane	Swing Symphonies
24	Abou Ben Boogie	Miss X, Abou Ben Boogie, Camellia	1944	James Culhane	Swing Symphonies
25	The Pied Piper of Basin Street	The Pied Piper	1945	James Culhane	Swing Symphonies

- Bonus features:
  - Six A Moment with Walter Lantz segments produced for The Woody Woodpecker Show
    - Episode 1: Origin of Woody Woodpecker - Walter recounts where he got the idea for Woody, and how he came to be.
    - Episode 5: Drawing with Shapes - Walter teaches the audience how to draw characters using simple shapes and lines.
    - Episode 8:
    - Episode 9: The Evolution of Woody - Walter explains Woody's various changes over the years, showing clips from cartoons: Knock Knock, The Beach Nut
    - Episode 10: The Director's Job - Walter details the many steps and skills needed to direct a cartoon.

=== Disc 3 ===
The third disc features Woody Woodpecker's next 15 cartoons after Wacky-Bye Baby along with the cartoon that introduced "The Woody Woodpecker Song" (Wet Blanket Policy) and highlights the "silent" era of cartoons that made Woody popular internationally (Puny Express to Scalp Treatment). It also includes the first five Chilly Willy cartoons (including both cartoons directed by Tex Avery) and a further five miscellaneous cartoons including the other two from the studio directed by Tex Avery (Crazy Mixed Up Pup and Sh-h-h-h-h-h).

#	Title	Co-stars	Year	Director	Series
1	Wet Blanket Policy	Buzz Buzzard, Andy Panda	1948	Dick Lundy	Woody Woodpecker
2	Wild and Woody!	Buzz Buzzard, Wild Bill Hiccup, Hairy James	1948	Dick Lundy	Woody Woodpecker
3	Drooler's Delight	Buzz Buzzard	1949	Dick Lundy	Woody Woodpecker
4	Puny Express	Buzz Buzzard, Flea Biscuit	1951	Walter Lantz and Dick Lundy	Woody Woodpecker
5	Sleep Happy	Wally Walrus	1951	Walter Lantz and Dick Lundy	Woody Woodpecker
6	Wicket Wacky	J. Goofer Gopher	1951	Walter Lantz	Woody Woodpecker
7	Slingshot 6 7/8	Buzz Buzzard,Wally Walrus	1951	Walter Lantz	Woody Woodpecker
8	The Redwood Sap	The Starvation	1951	Walter Lantz	Woody Woodpecker
9	The Woody Woodpecker Polka	Wally Walrus, Andy Panda, Miranda, Oswald the Lucky Rabbit, Rosabelle, Charlie	1951	Walter Lantz	Woody Woodpecker
10	Destination Meatball	Buzz Buzzard	1951	Walter Lantz	Woody Woodpecker
11	Born to Peck	Mama, Papa, Doc	1952	Walter Lantz	Woody Woodpecker
12	Stage Hoax	Buzz Buzzard, Wally Walrus, Martian Termites	1952	Walter Lantz	Woody Woodpecker
13	Woodpecker in the Rough	Bull Dozer	1952	Walter Lantz	Woody Woodpecker
14	Scalp Treatment	Buzz Buzzard, Squaw	1952	Walter Lantz	Woody Woodpecker
15	The Great Who-Dood-It	Buzz Buzzard	1952	Don Patterson	Woody Woodpecker
16	Chilly Willy	Nipper	1953	Paul J. Smith	Chilly Willy
17	I'm Cold	Smedley	1954	Tex Avery	Chilly Willy
18	The Legend of Rockabye Point	Charles	1955	Tex Avery	Chilly Willy
19	Hot and Cold Penguin	Smedley	1955	Alex Lovy	Chilly Willy
20	Room and Wrath	Smedley	1956	Alex Lovy	Chilly Willy
21	Boogie Woogie Bugle Boy of Company "B"	Hot-Breath Harry	1941	Walter Lantz	N/A
22	Mother Goose on the Loose	Little Boy Blue, Jack Be Nimble, Peter Piper, Little Bo-Peep, Simple Simon, Three Blind Mice, Old King Cole, Georgie Porgie, Little Jack Horner, Mary, Ten Little Indians	1942	Walter Lantz	Cartune
23	Pigeon Patrol	Homer, Daisy	1942	Alex Lovy	Cartune
24	Crazy Mixed Up Pup	Rover, Fifi	1955	Tex Avery	Maggie and Sam
25	Sh-h-h-h-h-h	Mr. Twiddle, Dr. I. M. JIttery	1955	Tex Avery	N/A

- Bonus features:
  - The complete 1964 halloween special episode of The Woody Woodpecker Show, featuring the three cartoons (the first two having swapped places):
    - Under the Counter Spy (Woody Woodpecker)
    - Playful Pelican (Andy Panda)
    - Spook-a-Nanny, the only original Woody Woodpecker cartoon created for the series.
