= The Woody Woodpecker and Friends Classic Cartoon Collection: Volume 2 =

Three-disc DVD collection of cartoons starring Woody Woodpecker

The Woody Woodpecker and Friends Classic Cartoon Collection: Volume 2 is a three-disc DVD collection of theatrical cartoons starring Woody Woodpecker and the other Lantz characters, produced by Walter Lantz Productions for Universal Pictures between 1932 and 1965. The set was released by Universal Pictures Home Entertainment on April 15, 2008, and is a sequel to the first volume from the year prior. Included in the set are a further 75 cartoon shorts, including 45 cartoons featuring Woody Woodpecker and 30 other Universal cartoons as before, including those featuring Oswald the Lucky Rabbit, Andy Panda, and Chilly Willy, and musical shorts.

With some exceptions like 2009's Woody Woodpecker Favorites DVD (a mini-collection of 20 cartoons from the first volume), there would be no further Walter Lantz collections until 2021's The Woody Woodpecker Screwball Collection on Blu-ray, featuring 25 high-definition cartoons solely starring Woody Woodpecker, which was later followed up by 2026's The Woody Woodpecker and Friends Golden Age Collection also on Blu-ray, featuring another 25 high-definition cartoons with only 8 starring Woody Woodpecker.

== DVD contents ==
=== Disc one ===
The first disc features Woody Woodpecker's next 15 cartoons after The Great Who-Dood-It, including all cartoons released in 1953 and 1954. It also includes five Oswald cartoons including the one introducing his rabbit head design (Puppet Show) and five miscellaneous cartoons including two with lesser-known characters.

#	Title	Co-stars / Stars	Year	Director	Series
1	Termites from Mars	Martian Termites	1952	Don Patterson	Andy Panda
2	What's Sweepin'	Wally Walrus	1953	Don Patterson	Woody Woodpecker
3	Buccaneer Woodpecker	Buzz Buzzard, Wally Walrus	1953	Don Patterson	Woody Woodpecker
4	Operation Sawdust	Buzz Buzzard, Wally Walrus	1953	Don Patterson	Woody Woodpecker
5	Wrestling Wrecks	Bull Dozer, Precious Percy, Elmer	1953	Don Patterson	Woody Woodpecker
6	Belle Boys	Buzz Buzzard, Ga Ga Gazoo	1953	Don Patterson	Woody Woodpecker
7	Hypnotic Hick	Buzz Buzzard, I. Gypem	1953	Don Patterson	Woody Woodpecker
8	Hot Noon (or 12 O'Clock For Sure)	Buzz Buzzard, Señorita, Booze and Bizz	1953	Paul J. Smith	Woody Woodpecker
9	Socko in Morocco	Buzz Buzzard, Princess Salami, Socko	1954	Don Patterson	Woody Woodpecker
10	Alley to Bali	Buzz Buzzard, Babalu	1954	Don Patterson	Woody Woodpecker
11	Under the Counter Spy	Thursday and Al, The Bat, Mama	1954	Don Patterson	Woody Woodpecker
12	Hot Rod Huckster	Buzz Buzzard	1954	Don Patterson	Woody Woodpecker
13	Real Gone Woody	Buzz Buzzard, Winnie	1954	Don Patterson	Woody Woodpecker
14	A Fine Feathered Frenzy	Gorgeous	1954	Don Patterson	Woody Woodpecker
15	Convict Concerto	Mugsy, Butch	1954	Don Patterson	Woody Woodpecker
16	Carnival Capers	Pete	1932	Walter Lantz and Bill Nolan	Oswald the Lucky Rabbit
17	Five and Dime	Ortensia the Cat, Doc Stork	1933	Bill Nolan and Tex Avery	Oswald the Lucky Rabbit
18	Wax Works	The Hunchback of Notre Dame, Blue Beard, Dracula, Frankenstein, The Mummy, Mr. Hyde, The Invisible Man	1934	Walter Lantz and Bill Nolan	Oswald the Lucky Rabbit
19	Springtime Serenade	Bunny Lou, Prof. Groundhog	1935	Manuel Moreno	Oswald the Lucky Rabbit
20	Puppet Show		1936	Walter Lantz and Manuel Moreno	Oswald the Lucky Rabbit
21	She Done Him Right	Poodles, Dopey Dick	1933	Walter Lantz	Pooch the Pup
22	Jolly Little Elves		1934	Walter Lantz and Bill Nolan	Cartune Classics
23	Candyland		1935	Walter Lantz	Cartune Classics
24	A Haunting We Will Go	Lil' Eightball	1939	Burt Gillett	N/A
25	Fair Today		1941	Walter Lantz	Cartune

- Bonus features:
  - Six "Behind the Scenes with Walter Lantz" segments from The Woody Woodpecker Show.

=== Disc two ===
The second disc features all of Woody Woodpecker's cartoons from 1955 and 1956, plus the first of two cartoons starring his nephew and niece, Knothead and Splinter. It also includes five Andy Panda cartoons including one with him sporting a different design and malicious personality (The Painter and the Pointer) and five "Musical Favouites" cartoons across the Swing Symphonies and Musical Miniatures series.

#	Title	Co-stars / Stars	Year	Director	Series
1	Helter Shelter	Happy, Claude, Phoebe	1955	Paul J. Smith	Woody Woodpecker
2	Witch Crafty	Winifred	1955	Paul J. Smith	Woody Woodpecker
3	Private Eye Pooch	Professor Dingledong, Strongnose	1955	Paul J. Smith	Woody Woodpecker
4	Bedtime Bedlam	Mrs. J. P. Moneybelt	1955	Paul J. Smith	Woody Woodpecker
5	Square Shootin' Square	Denver	1955	Paul J. Smith	Woody Woodpecker
6	Bunco Busters	Buzz Buzzard, Captain Haddock, Santa Claus	1955	Paul J. Smith	Woody Woodpecker
7	The Tree Medic		1955	Alex Lovy	Woody Woodpecker
8	After the Ball	Pierre	1956	Paul J. Smith	Woody Woodpecker
9	Get Lost	Woody Woodpecker	1956	Paul J. Smith	Knothead and Splinter
10	Chief Charlie Horse	Charlie	1956	Paul J. Smith	Woody Woodpecker
11	Woodpecker from Mars	Captain Zoom	1956	Paul J. Smith	Woody Woodpecker
12	Calling All Cuckoos	Herr Spring	1956	Paul J. Smith	Woody Woodpecker
13	Niagara Fools		1956	Paul J. Smith	Woody Woodpecker
14	Arts and Flowers	Artful Art	1956	Paul J. Smith	Woody Woodpecker
15	Woody Meets Davy Crewcut	Davy Crewcut	1956	Alex Lovy	Woody Woodpecker
16	100 Pygmies and Andy Panda	Papa, Mr. Whippletree	1940	Alex Lovy	Andy Panda
17	The Painter and the Pointer	Butch	1944	James Culhane	Andy Panda
18	The Poet and Peasant		1946	Dick Lundy	Andy Panda
19	Mousie Come Home	Milo, Mousie	1946	James Culhane	Andy Panda
20	Dog Tax Dodgers	Dizzy, Wally Walrus, Itchy	1948	Dick Lundy	Andy Panda
21	The Hams That Couldn't Be Cured	Algernon, Three Little Pigs	1942	Walter Lantz	Swing Symphonies
22	Juke Box Jamboree	Muzie	1942	Alex Lovy	Swing Symphonies
23	Boogie Woogie Man		1943	James Culhane	Swing Symphonies
24	The Overture to William Tell	Wally Walrus	1947	Dick Lundy	Musical Miniatures
25	Pixie Picnic	Woody Woodpecker	1948	Dick Lundy	Musical Miniatures

- Bonus features:
  - Six "Behind the Scenes with Walter Lantz" segments produced for The Woody Woodpecker Show
  - Rare TV pilot episodes: "The Secret Weapon" (starring Space Mouse) and "Jungle Medics"

=== Disc three ===
The third disc features all of Woody Woodpecker's cartoons from 1957 and 1958, plus the second of two cartoons starring his nephew and niece, Knothead and Splinter. It also includes five Chilly Willy cartoons including one with Woody regular Wally Walrus, and five "Cartune Co-Stars" cartoons focusing on secondary characters from the 1950s.

#	Title	Co-stars / Stars	Year	Director	Series
1	Red Riding Hoodlum	Woody Woodpecker, Wolfie, Smokey Bear, Granny, Three Bears, Three Little Pigs	1957	Paul J. Smith	Knothead and Splinter
2	Box Car Bandit	Denver	1957	Paul J. Smith	Woody Woodpecker
3	The Unbearable Salesman	Knothead and Splinter, Windy prototype	1957	Paul J. Smith	Woody Woodpecker
4	International Woodpecker	Knothead and Splinter, Winnie	1957	Paul J. Smith	Woody Woodpecker
5	To Catch a Woodpecker	Terrance, Mr. Stoop	1957	Alex Lovy	Woody Woodpecker
6	Round Trip to Mars	Professor Dingledong	1957	Paul J. Smith	Woody Woodpecker
7	Dopey Dick the Pink Whale	Denver, Dopey Dick	1957	Paul J. Smith	Woody Woodpecker
8	Fodder and Son	Windy and Breezy	1957	Paul J. Smith	Woody Woodpecker
9	Misguided Missile	Denver	1958	Paul J. Smith	Woody Woodpecker
10	Watch the Birdie		1958	Alex Lovy	Woody Woodpecker
11	Half Empty Saddles	Denver, Sugarfoot	1958	Paul J. Smith and Alex Lovy	Woody Woodpecker
12	His Better Elf	O'Toole, Terrance	1958	Paul J. Smith	Woody Woodpecker
13	Everglade Raid	All. I. Gator (Gabby prototype)	1958	Paul J. Smith	Woody Woodpecker
14	Tree's a Crowd	Clyde, Colonel Fleabush	1958	Paul J. Smith	Woody Woodpecker
15	Jittery Jester	Denver	1958	Paul J. Smith	Woody Woodpecker
16	Hold That Rock	Smedley	1956	Alex Lovy	Chilly Willy
17	Operation Cold Feet	Smedley	1957	Alex Lovy	Chilly Willy
18	Clash and Carry	Wally Walrus	1961	Jack Hannah	Chilly Willy
19	Deep Freeze Squeeze	Smedley	1964	Sid Marcus	Chilly Willy
20	Half Baked Alaska	Smedley	1965	Sid Marcus	Chilly Willy
21	Maw and Paw	The Kids, Milford	1953	Paul J. Smith	N/A
22	A Horse's Tale	John and Millie, Pewter	1954	Paul J. Smith	Sugarfoot
23	Dig That Dog	Cuddles, Percy P. Pettipoint	1954	Ray Patterson and Grant Simmons	Cartune
24	The Ostrich Egg and I		1956	Alex Lovy	Maggie and Sam
25	Salmon Yeggs	Inspector Willoughby	1958	Paul J. Smith	Windy and Breezy

- Bonus features:
  - The Woody Woodpecker Show: Episode #47: contains Ballyhooey (Woody Woodpecker, 1960), Rough and Tumbleweed (1961), Franken-Stymied (Woody Woodpecker, 1961), and Mother's Little Helper (1962)
