= Oswald the Lucky Rabbit filmography =

Oswald the Lucky Rabbit
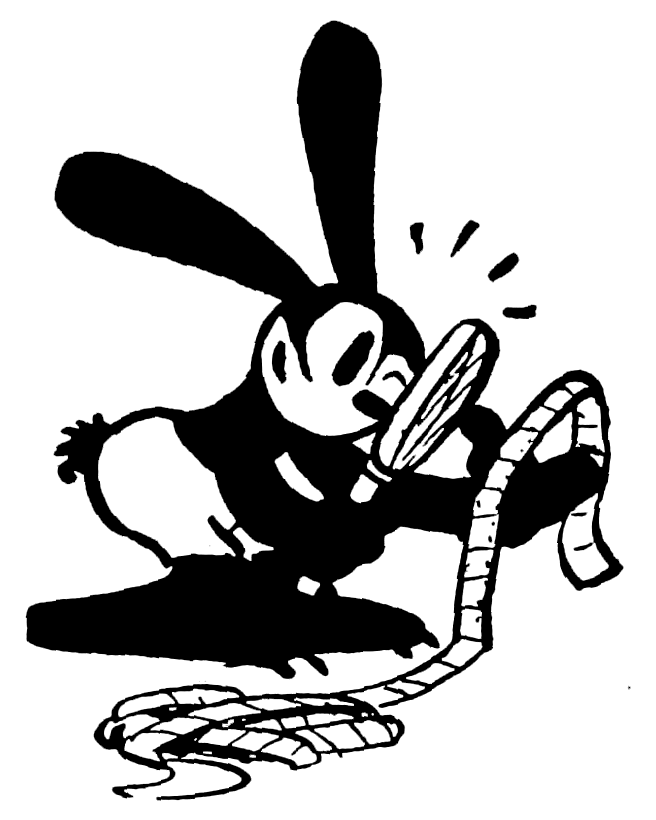
- Oswald checking film reel, The Film Daily, 1928
- Production companies: Winkler Pictures (1927–1929); Walter Lantz Productions (1929–1938); Walt Disney Animation Studios (2022)
- Distributed by: Universal Pictures (1927–1938); Walt Disney Studios Motion Pictures (2022)
- Country: United States

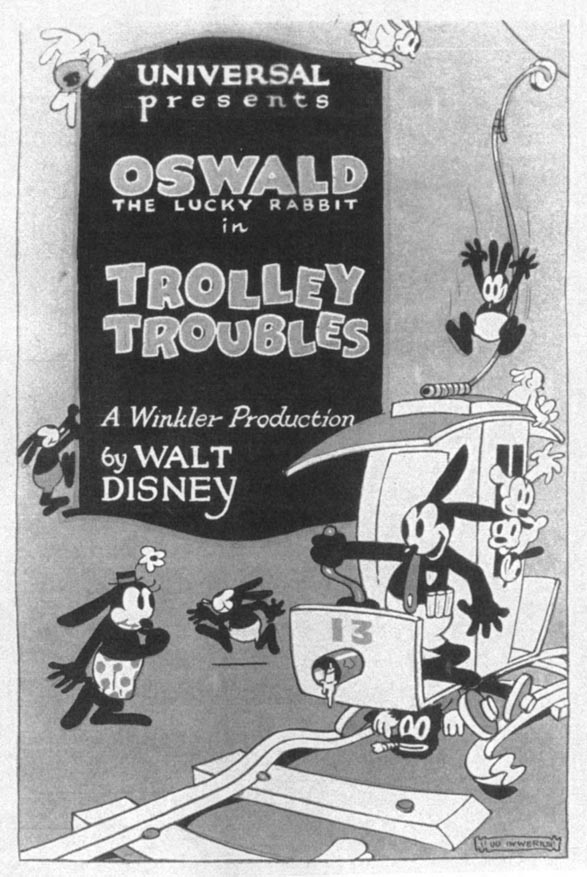
Poster for Trolley Troubles, Oswald's first appearance

The following is a complete list of cartoons, films, video games, etc. featuring Oswald the Lucky Rabbit created or licensed by either Universal Pictures (owner of the character's trademark before 2006) or The Walt Disney Company (owner of the character's trademark after 2006). This does not include content made by external artists or studios using the character's public domain status.

== Universal Pictures ==
=== Oswald the Lucky Rabbit/Oswald Rabbit series ===
This list contains 190 cartoons released between 1927 and 1938 that were part of Universal Pictures' Oswald the Lucky Rabbit/Oswald Rabbit theatrical cartoon series. The Walt Disney Studio animated 26 of the first 27 cartoons (1927–1928) for producer Winkler Pictures. Winkler Pictures moved production in-house after a contractual dispute with Disney. Winkler Pictures produced the 25th cartoon, High Up, and an additional 25 cartoons (1928–1929). Walter Lantz produced the final 148 cartoons starting with Race Riot, first as head of Universal Cartoon Studios (1929–1935) and then as his own Walter Lantz Studio (1935–1938).

==== Winkler Pictures ====
The first 27 films are owned by Disney Enterprises, while the rest are owned by Universal Pictures, excluding films in the public domain.

===== 1927 =====
#	Title	Released	Director(s)	Distributor	Film (If Available)	Notes
1	Trolley Troubles	September 5, 1927	Walt Disney	Universal Pictures		First Oswald cartoon released.; The cartoon was reissued in 1931 with synchronized sound.
2	Oh Teacher	September 19, 1927	Walt Disney	Universal Pictures		Reissued with synchronized sound. A few sequences went missing, and others were reordered when the cartoon was reissued.
3	The Mechanical Cow	October 3, 1927	Walt Disney	Universal Pictures		Reissued in 1932 with synchronized sound.
4	Great Guns!	October 17, 1927	Walt Disney	Universal Pictures		Reissued in 1932 with synchronized sound.
5	All Wet	October 31, 1927	Ub Iwerks	Universal Pictures		Reissued in 1932 with synchronized sound.
6	The Ocean Hop	November 14, 1927	Walt Disney	Universal Pictures		A few sequences went missing when the cartoon was reissued in 1932.; Final Disney Oswald cartoon to be reissued with synchronized sound.
7	The Banker's Daughter	November 28, 1927	Walt Disney & Friz Freleng	Universal Pictures	Lost film.	The oldest lost Oswald cartoon.; The first appearance of Ortensia.; A production script, five story-sketch pages and two animation drawings are the only known materials to exist.; Directorial debut of Friz Freleng.
8	Empty Socks	December 11, 1927	Walt Disney & Ub Iwerks	Universal Pictures		Lost until 2015, when a print missing only a couple of sequences was found in Norway.; Considered to be Disney's first Christmas-themed cartoon.
9	Rickety Gin	December 26, 1927	Walt Disney & Friz Freleng	Universal Pictures	Lost film.	A production script and six story-sketch pages are the only known materials to exist.

===== 1928 =====
#	Title	Released	Director(s)	Distributor	Film (If Available)	Notes
10	Harem Scarem	January 9, 1928	Walt Disney	Universal Pictures	Lost film.	A production script, one background drawing and numerous animation drawings are the only known materials to exist.; Animation drawings from a small part of this film were compiled by Disney into a video clip in 2012.
11	Neck 'n' Neck	January 23, 1928	Walt Disney	Universal Pictures		Rediscovered in Japan in 2018 as part of a 16mm film titled Mickey Manga: Speedy (ミッキー漫画 スピーデー Mikkī Manga: Supīdē), though only as a two-minute cutdown of the original five-minute cartoon.
12	The Ol' Swimmin' Hole	February 6, 1928	Walt Disney	Universal Pictures		Rediscovered in Belgium in 2016 by David Gerstein, with a few sequences missing.
13	Africa Before Dark	February 20, 1928	Walt Disney & Ub Iwerks	Universal Pictures		Rediscovered in Austria in 2013.; Available with the Signature Edition of Bambi in 2017.
14	Rival Romeos	March 5, 1928	Walt Disney	Universal Pictures		
15	Bright Lights	March 19, 1928	Walt Disney	Universal Pictures		
16	Sagebrush Sadie	April 1, 1928	Walt Disney	Universal Pictures	Lost film.	Many animation drawings and 8 story-sketch pages are the only known materials to exist.; The animation drawings (which consist of two scenes) of this film were compiled by Disney into a brief fragment video clip as a bonus feature on the 2007 Oswald The Lucky Rabbit Disney Treasures DVD.
17	Ride 'Em Plowboy	April 15, 1928	Walt Disney	Universal Pictures	Lost film.	Two background drawings and 5 story-sketch pages are the only known materials to exist.
18	Ozzie of the Mounted	April 30, 1928	Walt Disney	Universal Pictures		Survives almost complete, though a few sequences are still missing.
19	Hungry Hobos	May 14, 1928	Walt Disney	Universal Pictures		A once lost cartoon, it was rediscovered in a vault in England in November 2011.; Available with the Signature Edition of Snow White and the Seven Dwarfs in 2017.
20	Oh What a Knight	May 28, 1928	Walt Disney & Ub Iwerks	Universal Pictures		
21	Poor Papa	June 11, 1928	Walt Disney	Universal Pictures		First Oswald cartoon produced (in 1927), initially rejected but released a year later.; Disney was unable to access a print of Poor Papa in time for the 2007 DVD, but today owns a 16mm print of the short, and released it on the "Signature Edition" Blu-Ray of Pinocchio in 2017.
22	The Fox Chase	June 25, 1928	Walt Disney	Universal Pictures		
23	Tall Timber	July 9, 1928	Walt Disney	Universal Pictures		
24	Sleigh Bells	July 23, 1928	Walt Disney & Ub Iwerks	Universal Pictures	Unavailable online.	Rediscovered in the British Film Institute's National Archives and restored; ending is missing.
25	High Up	August 6, 1928	Rollin Hamilton & Rudolf Ising	Universal Pictures		Rediscovered by David Gerstein. Disney and Iwerks left before animation production started.
26	Hot Dogs	August 20, 1928	Walt Disney	Universal Pictures	Unavailable online.	A 16mm reel of the short titled "Oswald’s Prank", was sold on a Japanese marketplace in 2025. Print currently not in circulation.; The copyright synopsis, 2 backgrounds and 4 story-sketch pages of the cartoon are also known to survive.
27	Sky Scrappers	September 3, 1928	Walt Disney	Universal Pictures		In 2014, a 1928 print titled The Sky Scrapper was found in the United Kingdom with Winkler-era titles.; Remade as a Mickey Mouse 1933 short, Building a Building.; Final Oswald cartoon with any involvement from Disney and Iwerks.; Appears on a television playing in the background in the 2022 Marvel film Doctor Strange in the Multiverse of Madness.

===== 1928 =====
#	Title	Released	Director(s)	Distributor	Film (If Available)	Notes
28	Mississippi Mud	September 17, 1928	Walter Lantz	Universal Pictures	Lost film.	First cartoon with involvement from Lantz.; Released on Kodascope 16mms.
29	Panicky Pancakes	October 1, 1928	Hugh Harman & Ben Clopton	Universal Pictures	Lost film.	Released on Kodascope 16mms.
30	Fiery Firemen	October 15, 1928	Friz Freleng & Rudolf Ising	Universal Pictures		Earliest surviving post-Disney Oswald cartoon.
31	Rocks and Socks	November 12, 1928	Hugh Harman	Universal Pictures	Lost film.	
32	South Pole Flight	November 26, 1928	Hugh Harman & Ben Clopton	Universal Pictures	Lost film.	
33	Bull-Oney	November 28, 1928	Walter Lantz & Tom Palmer	Universal Pictures	Lost film.	
34	A Horse Tale	December 10, 1928	Walter Lantz & Tom Palmer	Universal Pictures	Lost film.	Two storyboard pages possibly of this short were auctioned in 2017.
35	Farmyard Follies	December 24, 1928	Walter Lantz & Rollin Hamilton	Universal Pictures	Incomplete.	Survives as a fragmentary nitrate print at UCLA Film & Television Archive.

===== 1929 =====
#	Title	Released	Director(s)	Distributor	Film (If Available)	Notes
36	Homeless Homer	January 7, 1929	Rudolf Ising & Friz Freleng	Universal Pictures		
37	Yanky Clippers	January 21, 1929	Walter Lantz & Tom Palmer	Universal Pictures		Final silent produced cartoon.
38	Hen Fruit	February 4, 1929	Friz Freleng	Universal Pictures	Lost film.	The first Oswald cartoon produced with sound.
39	Sick Cylinders	February 18, 1929	Hugh Harman & Ben Clopton	Universal Pictures	Without Sound	Exists only as a silent print.
40	Hold 'Em Ozzie!	March 4, 1929	Rollin Hamilton	Universal Pictures	Without Sound	Rediscovered in 2016, but it exists only as a silent print.
41	The Suicide Sheik	March 18, 1929	Hugh Harman	Universal Pictures		A film reel of this cartoon was found in 2019 by Ray Langstone. It is located at the State Archives Preservation Facility in Madison, Wisconsin and exists almost complete and with a soundtrack.; Earliest surviving Oswald sound cartoon.
42	Alpine Antics	April 1, 1929	Tom Palmer	Universal Pictures	Without Sound	Exists only as a silent print.
43	The Lumberjack	April 15, 1929	Ben Clopton	Universal Pictures	Incomplete.	According to UCLA Library Catalog, a shortened silent home film version is known to exist.
44	The Fishing Fool	April 29, 1929	Rollin Hamilton	Universal Pictures	Lost film.	
45	Stage Stunts	May 13, 1929	Walter Lantz	Universal Pictures	Lost film.	
46	Stripes and Stars	May 27, 1929	Walter Lantz	Universal Pictures	Lost film.	
47	The Wicked West	June 10, 1929	Friz Freleng	Universal Pictures	Unavailable online.	Survival status uncertain, evidence shows the short was possibly reissued by Walter Lantz in 1931, but it is currently unknown if Universal has a copy or if the reissue was included in the Guild Films television package.
48	Nuts and Jolts	June 24, 1929	Hugh Harman	Universal Pictures	Unavailable online.	Rediscovered in 2016. Exists only as a silent print.
49	Ice Man's Luck	July 8, 1929	Rollin Hamilton	Universal Pictures	Lost film.	
50	Jungle Jingles	July 22, 1929	Ben Clopton	Universal Pictures	Without Sound	Exists only as a silent print.
51	Weary Willies	July 22, 1929	Friz Freleng	Universal Pictures	Without Sound	Exists only as a silent print.
52	Saucy Sausages	August 19, 1929	Ben Clopton	Universal Pictures	Lost film.	Final Winkler Oswald cartoon.

==== Universal Cartoon Studios/Walter Lantz Studio ====
===== 1929 =====
#	Title	Released	Director	Distributor	Film (If Available)	Notes
53	Race Riot	September 2, 1929	Walter Lantz	Universal Pictures		First Oswald short produced in-house by Universal.
54	Oil's Well	September 16, 1929	Walter Lantz	Universal Pictures		
55	Permanent Wave	September 29, 1929	Walter Lantz	Universal Pictures		
56	Cold Turkey	October 15, 1929	Walter Lantz	Universal Pictures		An incomplete workprint of this cartoon exists.
57	Pussy Willie	October 28, 1929	Walter Lantz	Universal Pictures	Lost film.	
58	Amature Nite	November 11, 1929	Walter Lantz	Universal Pictures	Without Sound	A sound print exists according to UCLA Library Catalog.
59	Hurdy Gurdy	November 24, 1929	Walter Lantz	Universal Pictures		
60	Snow Use	November 25, 1929	Walter Lantz	Universal Pictures		
61	Nutty Notes	December 9, 1929	Walter Lantz	Universal Pictures		16mm Italian prints are known to exist with the working title "The Magic Piano" but only a few scenes and still images are publicly available.
62	Ozzie of the Circus	December 23, 1929	Walter Lantz	Universal Pictures	Lost film.	First Oswald short produced at Universal Cartoon Studios.

===== 1930 =====
#	Title	Released	Director(s)	Distributor	Film (If Available)	Notes
63	Kounty Fair	January 6, 1930	Walter Lantz	Universal Pictures	Without Sound	Exists only as a silent print.
64	Chilly Con Carmen	February 3, 1930	Walter Lantz	Universal Pictures		
65	Kisses and Kurses	February 17, 1930	Walter Lantz	Universal Pictures	Lost film.	
66	Broadway Folly	March 3, 1930	Walter Lantz	Universal Pictures		Final cartoon to feature the opening sequence with Oswald laughing on screen.
67	Bowery Bimbos	March 17, 1930	Walter Lantz	Universal Pictures	Unavailable online.	An original record of the soundtrack and a 16mm Italian print are known to exist but there are only a few still images publicly available.
68	Tramping Tramps	March 31, 1930	Walter Lantz	Universal Pictures		
69	The Hash Shop	April 14, 1930	Walter Lantz	Universal Pictures		
70	The Prison Panic	April 28, 1930	Walter Lantz	Universal Pictures		
71	Hot for Hollywood	May 19, 1930	Walter Lantz	Universal Pictures		Audio disc of the soundtrack was found in 2005.
72	Hells Heels	June 2, 1930	Walter Lantz	Universal Pictures		
73	My Pal Paul	June 16, 1930	Walter Lantz	Universal Pictures		Produced to promote the 1930 Universal feature film King of Jazz. Paul Whiteman is caricatured.
74	Not So Quiet	June 30, 1930	Walter Lantz	Universal Pictures		
75	Spooks	July 21, 1930	Walter Lantz	Universal Pictures		
76	Henpecked	August 11, 1930	Walter Lantz & Bill Nolan	Universal Pictures		
77	Cold Feet	August 18, 1930	Walter Lantz	Universal Pictures		A drawing made by the animators attributed to this short shows Oswald playing a radiator like an accordion. This idea never made it to the final cartoon.
78	Snappy Salesman	August 18, 1930	Walter Lantz	Universal Pictures		Possibly a withheld 1929 entry due to its production number "5082" being in a number range of the other 1929 Lantz cartoons, and many other factors present in the short.
79	The Singing Sap	September 15, 1930	Walter Lantz & Bill Nolan	Universal Pictures		First cartoon on which Tex Avery was credited as an animator (as Fred Avery).
80	The Detective	September 22, 1930	Walter Lantz	Universal Pictures		
81	The Fowl Ball	October 13, 1930	Walter Lantz	Universal Pictures		
82	The Navy	November 3, 1930	Walter Lantz & Bill Nolan	Universal Pictures		
83	Mexico	November 17, 1930	Walter Lantz & Bill Nolan	Universal Pictures		
84	Africa	December 1, 1930	Walter Lantz	Universal Pictures		Portions of this short were reused from the film, King of Jazz where they were colored in two-strip Technicolor.
85	Alaska	December 15, 1930	Walter Lantz	Universal Pictures		
86	Mars	December 29, 1930	Walter Lantz & Bill Nolan	Universal Pictures		

===== 1931 =====
#	Title	Released	Director(s)	Distributor	Film (If In The Public Domain)	Notes
87	China	January 12, 1931	Walter Lantz & Bill Nolan	Universal Pictures	Copyright renewed.	
88	College	January 28, 1931	Walter Lantz & Bill Nolan	Universal Pictures	Copyright renewed.	
89	Shipwreck	February 9, 1931	Walter Lantz & Bill Nolan	Universal Pictures	Copyright renewed.	
90	The Farmer	March 23, 1931	Walter Lantz & Bill Nolan	Universal Pictures	Copyright renewed.	
91	The Fireman	April 6, 1931	Walter Lantz & Bill Nolan	Universal Pictures	Copyright renewed.	
92	Sunny South	April 20, 1931	Walter Lantz & Bill Nolan	Universal Pictures	Copyright renewed.	
93	Country School	May 5, 1931	Walter Lantz & Bill Nolan	Universal Pictures	Copyright renewed.	
94	The Bandmaster	May 18, 1931	Walter Lantz & Bill Nolan	Universal Pictures		
95	Northwoods	June 29, 1931	Walter Lantz & Bill Nolan	Universal Pictures	Copyright renewed.	
96	The Stone Age	July 13, 1931	Walter Lantz & Bill Nolan	Universal Pictures	Copyright renewed.	
97	Radio Rhythm	July 27, 1931	Walter Lantz & Bill Nolan	Universal Pictures	Copyright renewed.	
98	Kentucky Belles	September 7, 1931	Walter Lantz & Bill Nolan	Universal Pictures	Copyright renewed.	
99	Hot Feet	September 14, 1931	Walter Lantz & Bill Nolan	Universal Pictures	Copyright renewed.	
100	The Hunter	October 12, 1931	Walter Lantz & Bill Nolan	Universal Pictures	Copyright renewed.	
101	Wonderland	October 26, 1931	Walter Lantz & Bill Nolan	Universal Pictures	Copyright renewed.	
102	The Hare Mail	November 30, 1931	Walter Lantz & Bill Nolan	Universal Pictures	Copyright renewed.	
103	The Fisherman	December 7, 1931	Walter Lantz & Bill Nolan	Universal Pictures	Copyright renewed.	
104	The Clown	December 21, 1931	Walter Lantz & Bill Nolan	Universal Pictures	Copyright renewed.	

===== 1932 =====
#	Title	Released	Director(s)	Distributor	Film (If In The Public Domain)	Notes
105	Grandma's Pet	January 18, 1932	Walter Lantz & Bill Nolan	Universal Pictures	Copyright renewed.	
106	Mechanical Man	February 15, 1932	Walter Lantz & Bill Nolan	Universal Pictures		
107	Wins Out	March 14, 1932	Walter Lantz & Bill Nolan	Universal Pictures	Copyright renewed.	
108	Beau and Arrows	March 28, 1932	Walter Lantz & Bill Nolan	Universal Pictures	Copyright renewed.	
109	Making Good	April 11, 1932	Walter Lantz & Bill Nolan	Universal Pictures		
110	Let's Eat	April 25, 1932	Walter Lantz & Bill Nolan	Universal Pictures	Copyright renewed.	
111	The Winged Horse	May 9, 1932	Walter Lantz & Bill Nolan	Universal Pictures	Copyright renewed.	
112	Cat Nipped	May 23, 1932	Walter Lantz & Bill Nolan	Universal Pictures	Copyright renewed.	
113	A Wet Knight	June 20, 1932	Walter Lantz & Bill Nolan	Universal Pictures	Copyright renewed.	
114	A Jungle Jumble	July 4, 1932	Walter Lantz & Bill Nolan	Universal Pictures	Copyright renewed.	
115	Day Nurse	July 18, 1932	Walter Lantz & Bill Nolan	Universal Pictures	Copyright renewed.	
116	The Busy Barber	September 12, 1932	Walter Lantz & Bill Nolan	Universal Pictures	Copyright renewed.	A remake of the silent 1929 Oswald cartoon Yanky Clippers.
117	Carnival Capers	October 10, 1932	Walter Lantz & Bill Nolan	Universal Pictures	Copyright renewed.	
118	Wild and Woolly	November 21, 1932	Bill Nolan	Universal Pictures	Copyright renewed.	
119	Teacher's Pests	December 19, 1932	Walter Lantz & Bill Nolan	Universal Pictures	Copyright renewed.	

===== 1933 =====
#	Title	Released	Director(s)	Distributor	Film (If In The Public Domain)	Notes
120	The Plumber	January 30, 1933	Bill Nolan	Universal Pictures		
121	The Shriek	February 27, 1933	Walter Lantz & Bill Nolan	Universal Pictures	Copyright renewed.	
122	Going to Blazes	April 10, 1933	Walter Lantz & Bill Nolan	Universal Pictures	Copyright renewed.	
123	Beau Best	May 22, 1933	Walter Lantz & Bill Nolan	Universal Pictures	Copyright renewed.	
124	Ham and Eggs	June 19, 1933	Walter Lantz & Bill Nolan	Universal Pictures	Copyright renewed.	
125	Confidence	July 31, 1933	Bill Nolan	Universal Pictures	Copyright renewed.	
126	Five and Dime	September 18, 1933	Walter Lantz	Universal Pictures	Copyright renewed.	
127	The Zoo	November 6, 1933	Walter Lantz & Bill Nolan	Universal Pictures	Copyright renewed.	
128	The Merry Old Soul	November 27, 1933	Walter Lantz & Bill Nolan	Universal Pictures	Copyright renewed.	Academy Award nominee. Among those that appear in the film are the band leader Paul Whiteman, "singer" Roscoe Ates, Mae West, Harold Lloyd, and Zasu Pitts.
129	Parking Space	December 18, 1933	Walter Lantz & Bill Nolan	Universal Pictures	Copyright renewed.	

===== 1934 =====
#	Title	Released	Director(s)	Distributor	Notes
130	Chicken Reel	January 1, 1934	Walter Lantz	Universal Pictures	
131	The Candy House	January 15, 1934	Walter Lantz	Universal Pictures	
132	The County Fair	February 5, 1934	Walter Lantz & Bill Nolan	Universal Pictures	
133	The Toy Shoppe	February 19, 1934	Walter Lantz & Bill Nolan	Universal Pictures	In 1984, Fred Ladd and Entercolor Technologies Corp. colorized this cartoon as a test for Universal. The studio rejected this and all future plans for colorizing black-and-white Lantz cartoons.
134	Kings Up	March 12, 1934	Walter Lantz	Universal Pictures	
135	Wolf! Wolf!	April 2, 1934	Walter Lantz	Universal Pictures	
136	The Ginger Bread Boy	April 16, 1934	Walter Lantz & Bill Nolan	Universal Pictures	The story within the cartoon is based on "The Gingerbread Man", a fairy tale published in 1875.
137	Goldielocks and the Three Bears	May 14, 1934	Walter Lantz	Universal Pictures	
138	Annie Moved Away	May 28, 1934	Walter Lantz	Universal Pictures	
139	Wax Works	June 15, 1934	Walter Lantz & Bill Nolan	Universal Pictures	
140	William Tell	July 9, 1934	Walter Lantz	Universal Pictures	
141	Chris Columbus, Jr.	July 23, 1934	Walter Lantz	Universal Pictures	
142	The Dizzy Dwarf	August 6, 1934	Walter Lantz	Universal Pictures	
143	Ye Happy Pilgrims	September 3, 1934	Walter Lantz	Universal Pictures	
144	Sky Larks	October 22, 1934	Walter Lantz & Bill Nolan	Universal Pictures	The first Oswald cartoon to use live-action footage.
145	Spring in the Park	November 12, 1934	Walter Lantz	Universal Pictures	

===== 1935 =====
#	Title	Released	Director	Distributor	Film (If In The Public Domain)	Notes
146	Robinson Crusoe Isle	January 7, 1935	Walter Lantz	Universal Pictures	Copyright renewed.	
147	The Hillbilly	February 1, 1935	Walter Lantz	Universal Pictures	Copyright renewed.	
148	Two Little Lambs	March 11, 1935	Walter Lantz	Universal Pictures	Copyright renewed.	
149	Do a Good Deed	March 25, 1935	Walter Lantz	Universal Pictures	Copyright renewed.	
150	Elmer the Great Dane	April 29, 1935	Walter Lantz	Universal Pictures	Copyright renewed.	The first appearance of Oswald's first dog, Elmer the Great Dane.
151	Towne Hall Follies	June 17, 1935	Tex Avery	Universal Pictures	Copyright renewed.	Avery's directorial debut. The storyline was reworked by Avery ten years later in MGM's Wild and Woolfy (this time set in the Wild West) featuring Droopy.
152	At Your Service	July 22, 1935	Walter Lantz	Universal Pictures	Copyright renewed.	
153	Bronco Buster	August 19, 1935	Walter Lantz	Universal Pictures	Copyright renewed.	
154	Amateur Broadcast	September 23, 1935	Walter Lantz	Universal Pictures	Copyright renewed.	
155	The Quail Hunt	October 28, 1935	Tex Avery	Universal Pictures		Final film to be directed by Avery.
156	Monkey Wretches	November 18, 1935	Walter Lantz	Universal Pictures	Copyright renewed.	The final appearance of Oswald in his original design; he would not appear with this design again until Epic Mickey released 75 years later.; The first film to be produced by Walter Lantz Productions after their independence from Universal.; The first appearance of Meany, Miny, and Moe; their popularity led to their development into a series of their own for Universal.
157	Case of the Lost Sheep	December 2, 1935	Walter Lantz	Universal Pictures	Copyright renewed.	The first cartoon to feature Manuel Moreno's white redesign of Oswald.
158	Doctor Oswald	December 23, 1935	Walter Lantz	Universal Pictures	Copyright renewed.	From this point onward, the character is referred to as "Oswald Rabbit" instead of "Oswald the Lucky Rabbit" in the title cards.

===== 1936 =====
#	Title	Released	Director	Distributor	Notes
159	Soft Ball Game	January 27, 1936	Walter Lantz	Universal Pictures	
160	Alaska Sweepstakes	February 17, 1936	Walter Lantz	Universal Pictures	
161	Slumberland Express	March 9, 1936	Walter Lantz	Universal Pictures	
162	Beauty Shoppe	March 30, 1936	Walter Lantz	Universal Pictures	
163	The Barnyard Five	April 20, 1936	Walter Lantz	Universal Pictures	
164	Fun House	May 4, 1936	Walter Lantz	Universal Pictures	
165	Farming Fools	May 25, 1936	Walter Lantz	Universal Pictures	
166	Battle Royal	June 22, 1936	Walter Lantz	Universal Pictures	
167	Music Hath Charms	September 7, 1936	Walter Lantz	Universal Pictures	
168	Kiddie Revue	September 21, 1936	Walter Lantz	Universal Pictures	
169	Beach Combers	October 5, 1936	Walter Lantz	Universal Pictures	
170	Night Life of the Bugs	October 9, 1936	Walter Lantz	Universal Pictures	The title parodies that of the 1935 Universal feature film Night Life of the Gods.
171	Puppet Show	November 2, 1936	Walter Lantz	Universal Pictures	The second Oswald cartoon since Sky Larks to use live-action footage.
172	The Unpopular Mechanic	November 6, 1936	Walter Lantz	Universal Pictures	
173	Gopher Trouble	November 30, 1936	Walter Lantz	Universal Pictures	

===== 1937 =====
#	Title	Released	Director(s)	Distributor	Notes
174	Everybody Sing	February 22, 1937	Walter Lantz	Universal Pictures	The first Oswald cartoon to feature the more streamlined, slimmer variation of Manuel Moreno's Oswald.
175	Duck Hunt	March 8, 1937	Walter Lantz	Universal Pictures	
176	The Birthday Party	March 29, 1937	Walter Lantz	Universal Pictures	
177	Trailer Thrills	May 3, 1937	Walter Lantz	Universal Pictures	
178	The Wily Weasel	June 7, 1937	Walter Lantz	Universal Pictures	
179	The Playful Pup	July 12, 1937	Walter Lantz	Universal Pictures	
180	Lovesick	October 4, 1937	Walter Lantz & Alex Lovy	Universal Pictures	
181	The Keeper of the Lions	October 18, 1937	Walter Lantz	Universal Pictures	
182	The Mechanical Handy Man	November 8, 1937	Walter Lantz	Universal Pictures	
183	Football Fever	November 15, 1937	Walter Lantz	Universal Pictures	
184	The Mysterious Jug	November 29, 1937	Walter Lantz	Universal Pictures	
185	The Dumb Cluck	December 20, 1937	Walter Lantz	Universal Pictures	

===== 1938 =====
#	Title	Released	Director	Distributor	Notes
186	The Lamp Lighter	January 10, 1938	Walter Lantz	Universal Pictures	
187	Man Hunt	February 7, 1938	Walter Lantz	Universal Pictures	
188	Yokel Boy Makes Good	February 21, 1938	Walter Lantz	Universal Pictures	The first appearance of Snuffy Skunk.
189	Trade Mice	February 28, 1938	Walter Lantz	Universal Pictures	
190	Feed the Kitty	March 14, 1938	Walter Lantz	Universal Pictures	Final installment in the Oswald series.

=== Other films and shorts ===
Title	Released	Director(s)	Distributor	Film (If In The Public Domain)	Notes
King of Jazz	April 19, 1930	John Murray Anderson	Universal Pictures		Feature film produced by Universal Pictures. First color appearance of Oswald, although only as a brief cameo.
Toyland Premiere	December 10, 1934	Walter Lantz	Universal Pictures	Copyright renewed.	Part of the Cartune series.
Springtime Serenade	May 27, 1935	Walter Lantz	Universal Pictures	Copyright renewed.	Part of the Cartune series.
Firemen's Picnic	August 16, 1937	Walter Lantz	Universal Pictures	Copyright renewed.	Meany, Miny, and Moe cartoon. Oswald makes a cameo.
Movie Phoney News	May 30, 1938	Walter Lantz	Universal Pictures	Copyright renewed.	New Universal cartoon. Uses recycled footage from earlier Oswald cartoons.
Happy Scouts	June 20, 1938	Walter Lantz	Universal Pictures	Copyright renewed.	New Universal cartoon. The final cartoon with Oswald shot in black and white.
Snuffy's Party	August 7, 1939	Walter Lantz	Universal Pictures	Copyright renewed.	Part of the Cartune series. Oswald makes a cameo at the beginning of the cartoon.
The Egg Cracker Suite	March 22, 1943	Ben Hardaway & Emery Hawkins	Universal Pictures	Copyright renewed.	Part of the Swing Symphony series.
Well Oiled	June 30, 1947	Dick Lundy	Universal Pictures	Copyright renewed.	Woody Woodpecker cartoon. Oswald makes a cameo.
The Woody Woodpecker Polka	October 29, 1951	Dick Lundy	Universal Pictures	Copyright renewed.	Woody Woodpecker cartoon.
Team Play	1952	Walter Lantz	Universal Pictures	Copyright renewed.	Commercial for Autolite.

== The Walt Disney Company ==
=== Online shorts ===
Title	Released	Distributor	Notes
Oswald Holiday Greeting Card	December 1, 2013	Walt Disney Productions	Web short
Oswald the Lucky Rabbit	December 1, 2022	Walt Disney Productions	Short film produced by Walt Disney Animation Studios. First appearance in a modern hand-drawn Disney short.

=== Other films and shorts ===
Title	Released	Director(s)	Distributor	Notes
Get a Horse!	June 11, 2013	Lauren MacMullan	Walt Disney Productions	Mickey Mouse short film. First appearance by Oswald in a Disney cartoon following the Walt Disney Company's re-acquisition in 2006.
Big Hero 6	October 23, 2014	Don Hall & Chris Williams	Walt Disney Productions	Walt Disney Animation Studios film based on a Marvel comic. Oswald's second cameo appearance as drawing in a film, but the first film he appeared in that was made by Disney.
Zootopia	February 13, 2016	Byron Howard & Rich Moore	Walt Disney Productions	Walt Disney Animation Studios film. Cameo as graffiti painting.
Doctor Strange in the Multiverse of Madness	May 2, 2022	Sam Raimi	Walt Disney Productions	Marvel Studios film. Wanda Maximoff's children can be seen watching the Oswald short Sky Scrappers on a TV in the background.
Chip 'n Dale: Rescue Rangers	May 20, 2022	Akiva Schaffer	Walt Disney Productions	Walt Disney Pictures film. Cameo as graffiti painting.
Once Upon a Studio	October 15, 2023	Dan Abraham & Trent Correy	Walt Disney Productions	Walt Disney Animation Studios short celebrating the 100th anniversary of The Walt Disney Company.

=== Television ===
Show	Year	Notes
Mickey Mouse	2016–2018	Disney animated series. Oswald appears in the episode "Entombed" (2016) as a hieroglyphic in a cameo in the title card, being his first television appearance. Oswald later has another cameo during the episode "Canned" (2017). Oswald's second cameo in television. He has a third cameo appearance in "Year of the Dog" (2018) in a marketing billboard for a soda product called "Oswald the Lucky Soda".
Oswald	2027	Live-action/animated hybrid Disney+ series. Post-production.

== Video games ==
Video game	Year	Notes
Férias Frustradas do Pica-Pau	1996	Woody Woodpecker video game. Oswald's first video game appearance.
Epic Mickey	2010	Disney video game. First appearance by Oswald in a Disney video game. First appearance of Oswald in his original design since 1935.
Epic Mickey 2: The Power of Two	2012	Disney video game.
Disney Infinity	2013	Disney video game. Oswald appears as part of the townspeople based on Disney characters.
Disney Tsum Tsum	2014	Disney mobile game developed by Line Corporation.
Disney Emoji Blitz	2016	Disney mobile game.
Disney Speedstorm	2023	Disney-licensed Gameloft video game developed by Gameloft Barcelona. Oswald and Ortensia were added during the game's fifth season of content.
Disney Dreamlight Valley	2023	Disney-licensed Gameloft video game developed by Gameloft Montreal. Oswald was added through "A Rift In Time" expansion

== Bibliography ==
- Bossert, David (2019). Oswald the Lucky Rabbit: The Search for the Lost Cartoons (revised special ed.). Disney Editions. ISBN 978-1-368-04207-9.
