= Mechanical Man =

Mechanical Man may refer to:

- Mechanical Man (film), a 1932 Oswald the Lucky Rabbit cartoon
- Mechanical Man (EP), a 1978 EP by Devo
- The Mechanical Man, a 1921 Italian science fiction film

== See also ==
- Mickey's Mechanical Man, a 1933 cartoon
- Bosko's Mechanical Man, a 1933 cartoon
- Mechanical Man 8, a fictional character in the Dragonball franchise
