= Sh-h-h-h-h-h =

- Directed by: Tex Avery
- Written by: Tex Avery
- Produced by: Walter Lantz
- Starring: Daws Butler
- Music by: Clarence Wheeler
- Animation by: Ray Abrams; Laverne Harding; Don Patterson
- Layouts by: Raymond Jacobs; Art Landy
- Color process: Technicolor
- Production company: Walter Lantz Productions
- Distributed by: Universal Pictures
- Release date: June 6, 1955
- Running time: 6 minutes
- Country: United States
- Language: English

Sh-h-h-h-h-h is a 1955 American cartoon directed by Tex Avery and produced by Walter Lantz. It was the fourth cartoon directed by Tex Avery at Walter Lantz Productions. This cartoon features the 1922 Okeh Laughing Record for much of its soundtrack. The short would be Avery's final Lantz cartoon, and last theatrical cartoon overall, as he would leave his career in theatrical animation.

== Plot ==
A short, mild-mannered man, Mr. Twiddle, plays the congas in a nightclub jazz combo; the incessant noise (the horn players point their instruments directly at Twiddle's head) cause him to have nervous tremors, and he leaves in the middle of the act while the rest of the band continues to play. Later, his psychiatrist Dr. I.M Jittery then tells him he is a "very sick man" suffering from "trombonosis" and recommends a relaxing trip to a quiet, secluded locale to restore his nerves. The doctor warns Twiddle that if he does not do so, he will blow up. So his wife (a nurse) makes travel arrangements.

Twiddle takes a plane to the Swiss Alps and checks in at the Hush-Hush Lodge, a mountaintop resort hotel which goes to great lengths to maintain absolute silence for its guests extending even to the desk bell, from which a little sign reading "DING!" pops out instead of audibly ringing. A porter (actually a bellboy) escorts Twiddle to his room, communicating entirely with written cards including one reading "CHEAP SKATE!" after receiving a nickel. Twiddle changes into a nightshirt, and settles in for a peaceful night's sleep.

In the next room, two porters bring in another guest's belongings, ominously including a trombone. Soon, the unseen neighbor begins playing, waking Twiddle. While he unsuccessfully tries to shut out the noise, a woman in the same room as the horn player starts laughing. Soon the musician, a deep-voiced man, starts laughing as well. Twiddle repeatedly attempts to ask the neighbors to be quiet, but is rudely and physically rebuffed each time (when Twiddle writes, "Will you please stop blowing that horn?" the unseen neighbor says "Shut up!") he soon resorts to violent tactics himself: a club, a cannon, a bomb, and finally a safe suspended by a rope, but they backfire on him as well. The entire time, the noisy neighbors are unseen, except for an occasional hand.

Eventually Twiddle's nerves give out; on the verge of a nervous breakdown, he begs the hotel's manager to find a doctor. He is quickly taken back upstairs—to the room next to his own, where the occupants are still laughing hysterically and playing the horn. Twiddle then sees to his shock that his neighbors are Dr. I.M. Jittery and the nurse, who have been unaware that their own patient was next door. Twiddle boils into rage, as Dr. Jittery reminds him of his nerves, but Twiddle explodes in a puff of black smoke. As Dr. Jittery tells the audience that people won't listen to their doctor's advice, he and his wife carry on laughing maniacally and honking on the trombone over the end title card.
