= The Karnival Kid =

1929 film by Walt Disney and Ub Iwerks

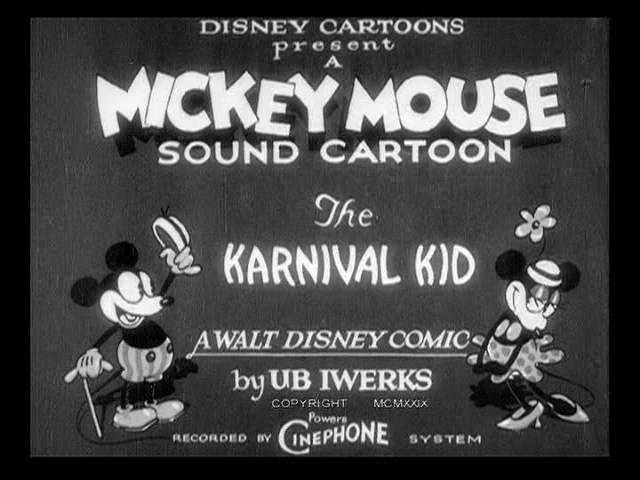
- Directed by: Walt Disney; Ub Iwerks
- Produced by: Walt Disney
- Starring: Carl W. Stalling; Walt Disney
- Music by: Carl W. Stalling
- Animation by: Ub Iwerks; Ben Sharpsteen; Jack King; Burt Gillett; Les Clark; Wilfred Jackson
- Color process: Black and white
- Production company: Disney Cartoons
- Distributed by: Celebrity Productions
- Release date: July 31, 1929
- Running time: 7:40
- Country: United States

The Karnival Kid is a 1929 American animated short film directed by Walt Disney and Ub Iwerks. It is the ninth film of the Mickey Mouse film series. It was the ninth Mickey Mouse short to be produced; the first where he speaks. Mickey's first spoken line is "Hot dogs! Hot dogs!", the voice being provided by composer Carl W. Stalling instead of Walt Disney. This would later serve as a basis for Mickey's later catchphrase "Hot dog!" It was released on July 31, 1929 by Celebrity Productions. As of January 1, 2025, the short is now in the public domain. Columbia Pictures reissued the film after Walt Disney Productions switched distributors.

== Plot ==
The full short film The Karnival Kid

The Karnival Kid is broken into two distinct segments. The first segment features Mickey selling hot dogs at a carnival. The second segment is set later that night and features Mickey, accompanied by two cats, in a moonlight serenade.

The short opens to the scene of a bustling carnival. After a few initial sight gags, the action quickly focuses on Kat Nipp, a barker at the carnival who is enticing a crowd to see Minnie, "the Shimmy Dancer". Mickey stands nearby, selling hot dogs and taunting Nipp. Nipp briefly gets into a dispute with Mickey over a dancing doll scam. As the audience watches the off-screen dance, Mickey calls out "Hot dogs! Hot dogs!", his first spoken line. However, Minnie soon notices Mickey and calls him over to order a hot dog. She takes a coin out of her stocking to pay, but Mickey, who is clearly attracted to her, refuses to accept the coin and gives it to her for free. When she bites into the hot dog, it screams and runs away. Mickey catches it and spanks it, concluding the first segment. Much of the humor in this segment comes from the interaction between Mickey and his hot dogs, with the latter tending to act like actual dogs in relation to their owner/trainer.

In the second segment, Mickey attempts to draw Minnie's attention by playing "Sweet Adeline" on the guitar, joined by two alley cats who imitate the monotone delivery of vaudeville comedy team Shaw and Lee. The sound delights Minnie but awakens an irate Kat Nipp, who had been resting in a nearby trailer. Nipp starts throwing things at the three annoyances in an attempt to silence them. The short ends as Mickey is hit with an entire bed and knocked dizzy.

Stalling's score for The Karnival Kid features two notable themes. During the "Shimmy Dance" sequence, a monkey, performing as a one-man band, plays the Snake Charmer song, the common name for The Streets of Cairo. During the moonlight serenade segment, Mickey and the cats perform a rendition of the barbershop standard Sweet Adeline.

== Voice cast ==
- Mickey Mouse: Carl W. Stalling
- Minnie Mouse: Walt Disney
- Barker: Walt Disney
- Singing cats: Carl W. Stalling

== Production ==
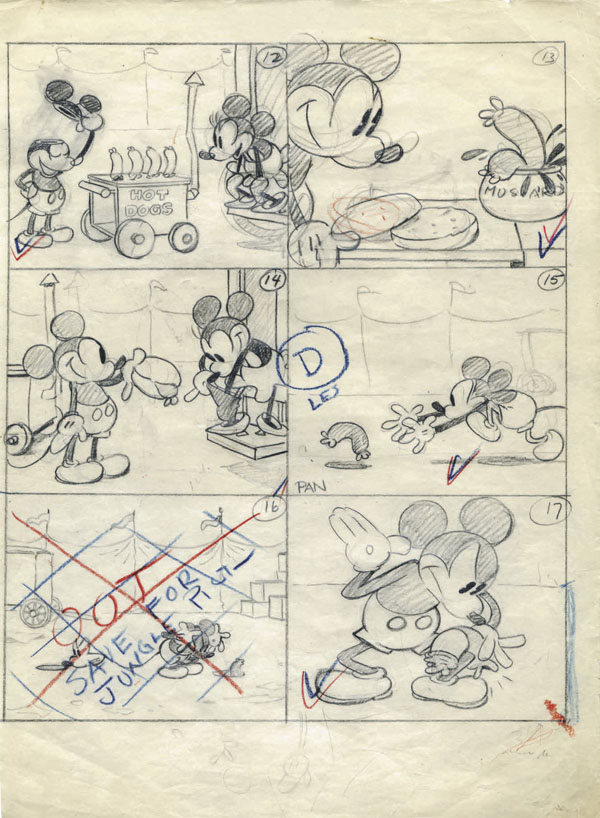
Storyboard/animation draft of The Karnival Kid drawn by Ub Iwerks

This was the first cartoon in which Mickey speaks English. Walt Disney was thrilled by the progress, but Pat Powers of Celebrity Pictures wasn't, as he worried that Mickey speaking English would affect overseas sales of the cartoons.

In Mickey's Movies: The Theatrical Films of Mickey Mouse, Gijs Grob observes: "The Karnival Kid shows that lip synchronization was far more difficult to master than synchronized sound itself. The animation of the mouth to form syllables was a totally new feat, and initially it was done all too literally. This led to awkward facial expressions at times, with especially Mickey's face distorting into a multitude of mouth gestures. The problem would become even worse in Mickey's next cartoon, Mickey's Follies".

The hot dog gags are reused from an earlier film, Disney's 1927 Oswald the Lucky Rabbit short All Wet.

== Legacy and influence ==
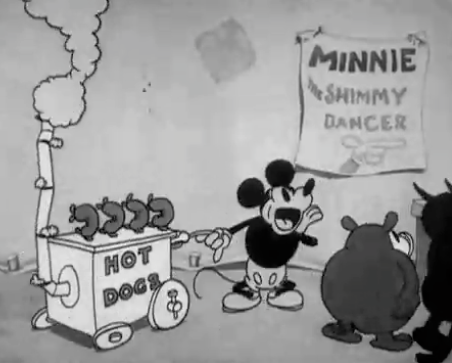
Hot dogs! Hot dogs! — Mickey Mouse (first spoken words)

Mickey's first words later inspired the "Hot Dog" song from Mickey Mouse Clubhouse.

The scene where Mickey tips his ears to Minnie inspired storyman Roy Williams to invent the Mickey Mouse ears hat.

Ub Iwerks reused elements of the plot and many of the visual gags from The Karnival Kid in his 1932 cartoon Circus. The part of the hot dog vendor is played by Flip the Frog.

New York Weenie, an episode from the 2013 Mickey Mouse shorts series, shares similar themes and gags with The Karnival Kid. The episode was directed by Aaron Springer, most notable for his work on SpongeBob SquarePants.

Artist Bruce Conner included the final shot in his film 3 Screen Ray.

An LCD Game & Watch-styled mini-game based on the short appears in the 2019 video game Kingdom Hearts III.

== Reception ==
The Film Daily (September 1, 1929): "Very Good: Mickey Mouse does his cartoonatics as a hot dog vendor at the circus grounds. The hot dogs come to life and the cartoonist gets a series of clever and funny gags that will make anybody laugh. Winds up with a serenade by two cats assisting Mickey win his gal. Clever, in the way that this series has grown to have a habit of being quite consistently."

== Home media ==
The short was released on December 2, 2002, on Walt Disney Treasures: Mickey Mouse in Black and White.

== See also ==
- Mickey Mouse (film series)
