= Wild and Woolly =

Wild and Woolly may refer to:

- Wild and Woolly (1917 film), an American silent Western comedy film
- Wild and Woolly (1932 film), a short animated film
- Wild and Woolly (1937 film), an American Western film
- Wild and Wooly, a 1978 comedy/western television film

== See also ==
- Wild & Woolley, an Australian book publisher
