= Cartune Classics =

Series of animated films

- Production company: Walter Lantz Productions
- Distributed by: Universal Pictures
- Country: United States
- Language: English

Cartune Classics is a short living series created by Walter Lantz and released by Universal Pictures in 1934 and 1935. The series lasted six cartoons and was filmed in two-strip Technicolor. One cartoon was nominated for an Academy Award for Best Animated Short Film, which is Jolly Little Elves from 1934.

== Filmography ==
#	Title	Released	Director	Notes
1	Jolly Little Elves	October 1, 1934	Walter Lantz	First Cartune Classic cartoon in the series. This cartoon was nominated at the 7th Academy Awards for Best Animated Short Film.
2	Toyland Premiere	December 10, 1934	Walter Lantz	Featuring Oswald the Lucky Rabbit
3	Candyland	April 22, 1935	Walter Lantz	
4	Springtime Serenade	May 27, 1935	Walter Lantz	Featuring Oswald the Lucky Rabbit
5	Three Lazy Mice	July 15, 1935	Walter Lantz	
6	Fox and the Rabbit	September 30, 1935	Walter Lantz	Last Cartune Classic cartoon in the series.

== See also ==
- Walter Lantz Productions
- Oswald the Lucky Rabbit filmography
