= All Wet =

All Wet may refer to:

- All Wet (album), a 2016 album by French musician Mr. Oizo
- All Wet, a 1921 American film starring Bud Duncan
- All Wet, a 1922 American film starring Al St. John
- All Wet (1924 film), an American film starring Charley Chase
- All Wet, a 1926 American film starring Snub Pollard
- All Wet (1927 film), an American cartoon
