= The Merry Old Soul =

- Advertisement
- Directed by: Walter Lantz; Bill Nolan
- Story by: Walter Lantz; Bill Nolan
- Produced by: Walter Lantz
- Music by: James Dietrich
- Animation by: Manuel Moreno; Lester Kline; Fred Kopietz; George Grandpre; Ernest Smythe
- Color process: Black and white
- Production company: Walter Lantz Productions
- Distributed by: Universal Pictures
- Release date: November 27, 1933
- Running time: 8:02
- Language: English

The Merry Old Soul is a 1933 animated short film by Walter Lantz Productions, as part of the Oswald the Lucky Rabbit series. The cartoon was nominated for the Academy Award for Best Cartoon Short Subject.

== Plot ==
Oswald goes to a dental clinic for treatment to his cavity problem. While the dentist tries to pull out his damaged tooth, news break out of a radio in the shop, reporting that the king is in serious depression and needs to be cheered up. In this, Oswald abandons his dental treatment, and heads outside to spread the word.

In his castle, Old King Cole is having a long face for some reason. His personal jester tries to brighten him up but to no avail, and therefore, leaves the throne room. Oswald then shows up and reads to him a book of comical rhymes. The rabbit's attempt helps a little and the king's mood improves slightly. Other entertainers (caricatures of film comedians Charlie Chaplin, Laurel and Hardy, The Marx Brothers, and Jimmy Durante) also come in for a similar cause. Each of them has a distinctive method in providing comedy. It all comes down when some of them employs an act that involves hurling pies at each other. Eventually, everyone in the room joins the food fight, and so does the king who starts to enjoy it.

Momentarily, the jester returns to the throne room to see what is happening. Upon noticing the king back in good spirits, the jester grows envious, and decides to take his grudge on one of the entertainers. The jester captures Oswald and brings the rabbit into a torture chamber at a basement of the castle. He then puts a noose around Oswald's neck, with other end of the rope being pulled by three elephants. Oswald finds this ordeal impossible to get out of.

It appears the experience at the castle was nothing more than a nightmare as Oswald wakes up and sees himself still at the dental clinic. The dentist, at last, succeeds in extracting the tooth, and Oswald is relieved of his dental worries.

== Availability ==
The short is available on The Woody Woodpecker and Friends Classic Cartoon Collection DVD box set.

== See also ==
- Oswald the Lucky Rabbit filmography
