= Spooks (1930 film) =

1930 film

- Animated title card
- Directed by: Walter Lantz
- Produced by: Walter Lantz
- Starring: Pinto Colvig
- Music by: James Dietrich
- Animation by: Bill Nolan; Ray Abrams; Manuel Moreno; Clyde Geronimi; Pinto Colvig
- Color process: Black and white
- Production company: Walter Lantz Productions
- Distributed by: Universal Pictures
- Release date: July 21, 1930
- Running time: 6:33
- Language: English

Spooks is a 1930 animated short subject produced by Walter Lantz and stars Oswald the Lucky Rabbit.

== Plot ==
Full short

First glimpsed stalking through a cemetery, a phantom is seen, wearing a hat, mask and coat (who, being magical, will later be shown to be able to fly as well as pass through small openings).

While travelling through the air, the phantom finds a studio where actors are making auditions while others are doing rehearsals. As he enters, he sees a female cat weeping. The phantom approaches her and asks why she is crying. Speaking unintelligibly, the cat tells him she desperately wants to sing at the audition and possibly make it to concerts. Her tongue however is knotted, thus she can not say even a simple word. Feeling sorry for the cat and falling in love with her, the phantom decides to help out.

To assist his love interest, the phantom places a phonograph in the cat's skirt so she may lip sync as a record plays a song. The cat sets foot on the audition stage and performs her act, although it isn't a smooth one. The record repeats a line many times and slows down, but the studio staff watching don't seem to mind. When the record stops in the middle of the song, the phantom secretly comes to her aid and turns the phonograph's cluster. The song continues and the cat 'sings' again. She manages to do well on the final lines, to the delight of those attending.

As the cat happily gets down from the stage, the overjoyed phantom decides to congratulate her with an embrace. Much to the phantom's surprise, however, the cat sidesteps him and walks to another guy standing behind. The other guy is none other than Oswald the Lucky Rabbit. Feeling insulted, the phantom grabs the cat and takes her to a secret room within the studio.

Upon reaching his secret place, the phantom decides to play the organ of the room. As he plays, he advises the cat not to take off his mask. Curious of why she should not, the cat opts to do so as she tiptoes towards the phantom. As she removes the mask of her captive, the cat is surprised to find out that the phantom's face has no skin or flesh, and is therefore a skeleton in garments. Oswald somehow manages to locate the secret room and knocks on the door loudly. Disturbed by the noise, the phantom leaves the cat inside and decides to confront the rabbit.

Seeing the phantom fly toward him, Oswald runs away as quickly as he can. On his getaway, Oswald stumbles and falls into a hole. On landing upon the bottom floor, the rabbit is bumped by a few large lizards that pass by. Oswald then thinks his troubles are over, but more still await as the phantom follows him there.

Instead of tormenting the rabbit, the phantom chooses to just ask a riddle. He asks "What does a chicken say when it lays a square egg?" Not sure of an answer, Oswald gives up and admits to not having any idea. The phantom then slaps Oswald in the face, causing the rabbit to say "Ouch!" The warlock also discloses to Oswald that "Ouch!" was the answer and he elatedly disappears. From then on, nobody sees the phantom again.

== Availability ==
The short is available on The Woody Woodpecker and Friends Classic Cartoon Collection DVD box set.

== See also ==
- Oswald the Lucky Rabbit filmography
