= Ozzie of the Mounted =

1928 film by Walt Disney

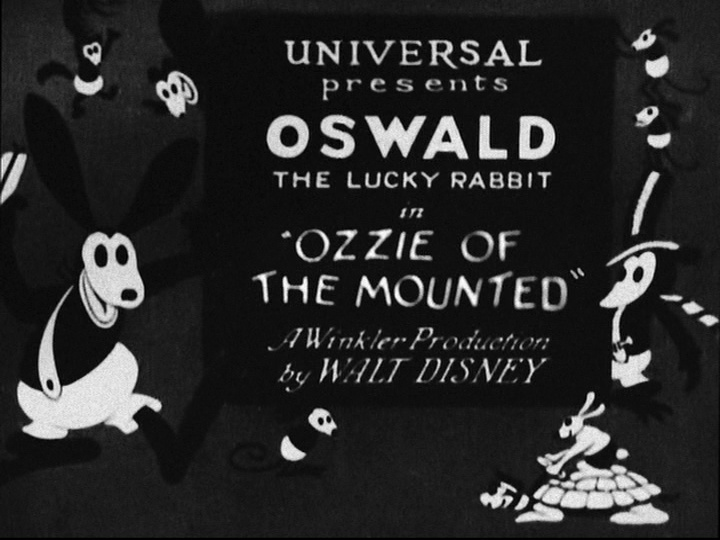
- Title card
- Directed by: Walt Disney
- Story by: Walt Disney
- Produced by: Charles Mintz; George Winkler
- Color process: Black and white
- Production company: Winkler Pictures
- Distributed by: Universal Pictures
- Release date: April 30, 1928
- Running time: 7 minutes
- Language: Silent

Ozzie of the Mounted is a 1928 American silent animated comedy short film directed by Walt Disney. It features Oswald the Lucky Rabbit.

== Plot ==
Full short

Oswald works for the North-West Mounted Police and is ordered to capture Peg Leg Pete to his chagrin. He quickly sets off in his mechanical horse and runs into Pete who walks on snowshoes towards a tavern. He fails to shoot Pete, who seemingly strangles him to death and sets off on a dog sled.

Oswald recovers and fails to fix his mechanical horse, as a spring decapitates him and the horse breaks down after his recovery, only for it to be immediately repaired when he kicks the remains in anger. As Oswald gives chase, he keeps being pinned by trees while Pete slams into logs, accidentally rides a moose before running into a bear who resembles a boulder. His dogs slam into a tree and accidentally merge. As the bear chases Oswald and Pete, Oswald is launched forward by the bear into the police station, exploiting the chance to open a jail cell. After Pete has his buttocks exposed by the bear, he is locked in jail with the bear, who mauls him to death while Oswald laughs in the sidelines. The final scene is shortened in the surviving print.

== Home media ==
The short was released on December 11, 2007 on Walt Disney Treasures: The Adventures of Oswald the Lucky Rabbit.

== See also ==
- Oswald the Lucky Rabbit filmography
