= High Up =

1928 film by Rollin Hamilton and Rudolf Ising

- Title card
- Directed by: Rollin Hamilton; Rudolf Ising
- Produced by: Charles Mintz; George Winkler
- Animation by: Rollin Hamilton; Rudolf Ising
- Color process: Black-and-white
- Production company: Winkler Pictures
- Distributed by: Universal Pictures
- Release date: August 6, 1928
- Running time: 8 min
- Country: United States
- Language: English

High Up is a 1928 American animated short film directed by Rollin Hamilton and Rudolf Ising in their directorial debuts. It features Oswald the Lucky Rabbit and is the first film in the series without major involvement from Walt Disney and Ub Iwerks. David Gerstein rediscovered the film in 2017.

== Plot ==
Full short

== See also ==
- Oswald the Lucky Rabbit filmography
