= Convict Concerto =

1954 animated short film by Don Patterson

- Title card
- Directed by: Don Patterson (uncredited)
- Story by: Hugh Harman
- Produced by: Walter Lantz
- Starring: Dal McKennon; Daws Butler; Grace Stafford (all uncredited)
- Music by: Clarence Wheeler; Piano player: Raymond Turner
- Animation by: Ray Abrams; Don Patterson; Herman Cohen
- Backgrounds by: Raymond Jacobs; Art Landy
- Color process: Technicolor
- Production company: Walter Lantz Productions
- Distributed by: Universal International
- Release date: November 22, 1954
- Running time: 6:11
- Country: United States
- Language: English

Convict Concerto is a 1954 Woody Woodpecker cartoon directed by Don Patterson. Released theatrically on November 22, 1954, the film was produced by Walter Lantz Productions and distributed by Universal International.

== Plot ==
Woody is a shy piano tuner who is held at gunpoint by a bank robber named Mugsy who is a fugitive. Mugsy hides out inside the grand piano Woody is tuning, and directs him to start playing immediately. Mugsy plays part of Frédéric Chopin's Funeral March to threaten Woody, who replies with a rousing rendition of Franz Liszt's "Hungarian Rhapsody No. 2". He manages to play the entire piece while being harassed by the gun-wielding Mugsy as well as a bricks-for-brains policeman hot on the trail of the stolen loot.

== Production notes ==
In Convict Concerto, the familiar red wood plank backdrop featured in the opening theme of Woody Woodpecker, where he bursts through a hole while announcing "Guess who?", is replaced by a light gray-colored wood backdrop. Notably, Woody appears noticeably smaller in this particular intro. This lighter background remained in use until 1970 when the series reverted to the red wood plank backdrop, albeit with the smaller Woody animation retained.

Veteran animator Hugh Harman is attributed with the story for this installment. He and Lantz had previously collaborated on the Oswald The Lucky Rabbit series during its production under Charles Mintz.

A reference to Russian composer Sergei Rachmaninoff occurs when Mugsy quips to Woody, "Keep up the good work, Rachmaninoff!"

Convict Concerto marked Don Patterson's final contribution as director on a Woody Woodpecker short, although he continued to work as an animator at Lantz until Heap Big Hepcat in 1960. Patterson was not credited as a director for this short.
