= Wax Works =

- The baby desperately wants to be with Oswald.
- Directed by: Walter Lantz; Bill Nolan
- Story by: Walter Lantz; Bill Nolan
- Produced by: Walter Lantz
- Starring: Bernice Hansen; Walter Lantz
- Music by: James Dietrich
- Animation by: Manuel Moreno; George Grandpre; Lester Kline; Verne Harding; Fred Kopietz; Victor McLeod
- Color process: Black and white
- Distributed by: Universal Pictures
- Release date: June 25, 1934
- Running time: 8 min.
- Language: English

Wax Works is a 1934 animated short subject by Walter Lantz and features Oswald the Lucky Rabbit.

== Plot ==
One evening, a penniless woman in an old hood is walking on the street, carrying a basket with a baby in it. She then lays it by the door of a wax museum owned by Oswald. The woman knocks on the door and leaves. Oswald opens up and sees what's in front of him. In doubt that he would make a good caretaker, however, the rabbit is reluctant to take the child in, and therefore goes back inside. Before the door closes, the baby, who is a boy, climbs out of the basket and enters the place.

To his surprise, Oswald finds the baby boy indoors. He then goes on walking around, wondering what he should do. But when the child clings onto his leg and asks to be accepted, Oswald changes his mind. As it gets late that night, Oswald goes to sleep, sharing his bed with his new little brother figure. The baby boy isn't sleepy and decides to have a little tour of the museum.

While wandering the museum's hallways, the baby boy finds part of his pajamas opened. He then asks some statues to close it for him. After one of them provides assistance, that statue decides to show the little sightseer around. Thus all the other wax characters in the area come to life and go into a celebration by singing and dancing.

The baby boy walks further in the museum and into another section. Unlike the ones he met previously, however, the statues there are hideous and hostile. They want nothing more than to torment anyone who steps into their abode. To defend himself, the baby boy grabs a blow torch, liquefying some of the wax monsters. Despite the child's advantage, the wax monsters are able to get close enough and take his weapon away. They then force their victim onto a platform and begin to pour molten wax on him. Back in the bedroom, Oswald hears the baby boy's cries for help, and makes the run. By the time the rabbit reaches the location, it is too late, and all that's left on the platform is a wax relic in the shape of an infant. Oswald is then caught by the wax monsters to suffer a similar fate.

It turns out all that trouble was in Oswald's dream. Finally waking up in his bed, Oswald is relieved to see the baby boy completely unscathed. He is then asked by the child to button the rear part of the latter's jammies, with Oswald reluctantly doing so.

== Availability ==
The short is available on The Woody Woodpecker and Friends Classic Cartoon Collection: Volume 2 DVD box set.

== See also ==
- Oswald the Lucky Rabbit filmography
