= Homeless Homer =

1929 film by Isadore Freleng and Rudolf Ising

- Title card
- Directed by: Isadore Freleng; Rudolf Ising
- Produced by: George Winkler
- Animation by: Isadore Freleng; Rudolf Ising
- Color process: Black and white
- Production company: Winkler Pictures
- Distributed by: Universal Pictures
- Release date: January 7, 1929
- Running time: 6:18
- Country: United States
- Language: English

Homeless Homer is a 1929 American animated short film directed by Isadore Freleng and Rudolf Ising. It stars Oswald the Lucky Rabbit. It is among the few Oswald shorts produced after Walt Disney's departure and before Universal Pictures founded their own studio known to still exist.

== Plot ==
The full film

== See also ==
- Oswald the Lucky Rabbit filmography
