= Carnival Capers =

1932 film

- Screenshot
- Directed by: Walter Lantz; Bill Nolan
- Story by: Walter Lantz; Bill Nolan
- Produced by: Walter Lantz
- Music by: James Dietrich
- Animation by: Ray Abrams; Fred Avery; Bill Weber; Jack Carr; Charles Hastings
- Color process: Black and white
- Production company: Walter Lantz Productions
- Distributed by: Universal Pictures
- Release date: October 10, 1932
- Running time: 7:14
- Language: English

Carnival Capers is a 1932 animated short film featuring Oswald the Lucky Rabbit. It is the 65th Oswald cartoon by Walter Lantz Productions and the 117th in the entire series.

== Plot ==
Oswald and the girl beagle (making her debut in this film) are at the fair, dancing on a wooden platform. All of a sudden, a large oppressive pit bull pulls it right under their feet, much to their surprise. The pit bull pretends to apologize by giving Oswald a handshake but snaps a rat trap at the rabbit's hand instead. When the large dog flirts with the girl beagle, the annoyed Oswald quickly takes her and walks out of the scene.

Oswald and his date go to a refreshment stand to order ice cream sodas. Upon receiving their beverages, the pit bull shows up again, takes Oswald's drink, and consumes it. The girl beagle doesn't drink hers but instead pours the stuff in the pit bull's hat without the latter noticing. As the big dog puts on the hat and gets covered in a creamy mess, the two little tourists immediately move to another location.

After spending a few moments at the punch pad game which the pit bull got smashed by the machine on his head making the pit bull to feel dazed, Oswald and the girl beagle decide to have a ride. They select a bizarre one operated by a marsupial. The girl beagle is the first to go as the marsupial launches her high in the air where she lands and slides onto a series of animals. In the end, however, she is nabbed by the pit bull. Oswald comes to her assistance by picking up a bow and shooting arrows at the pit bull's back. Due to this, the large dog drops the girl beagle and sets sights on the rabbit.

Running from the pit bull, Oswald climbs and crawls through a small hole in the fence. The large dog attempts to get through too, only to get stuck halfway. The rabbit then draws a picture of a rat on the pit bull's rear, attracting a stray cat and then a hound, both of which go in a mauling fashion. Eventually, the pit bull is able to get out of the situation and continues pursuing Oswald.

Oswald, still on the run, enters a gate to the backyard of a house. Instead of going in also, the pit bull peeks through one of the windows. While his pursuer is still looking in, Oswald appears in front of the house from a distance and throws a stick at the other window, breaking the glass. The disturbed homeowner opens the door in the blink of an eye, therefore smashing the pit bull between it and the front wall. Oswald writes a "welcome" message on the flattened dog before placing the latter in front of the door. The girl beagle then shows up in the vicinity, happily calling Oswald. She and the rabbit go to celebrate things with a kiss.

== Availability ==
The short is available on The Woody Woodpecker and Friends Classic Cartoon Collection: Volume 2 DVD box set.

== See also ==
- Oswald the Lucky Rabbit filmography
