= Wild Waves =

1929 film by Burt Gillett

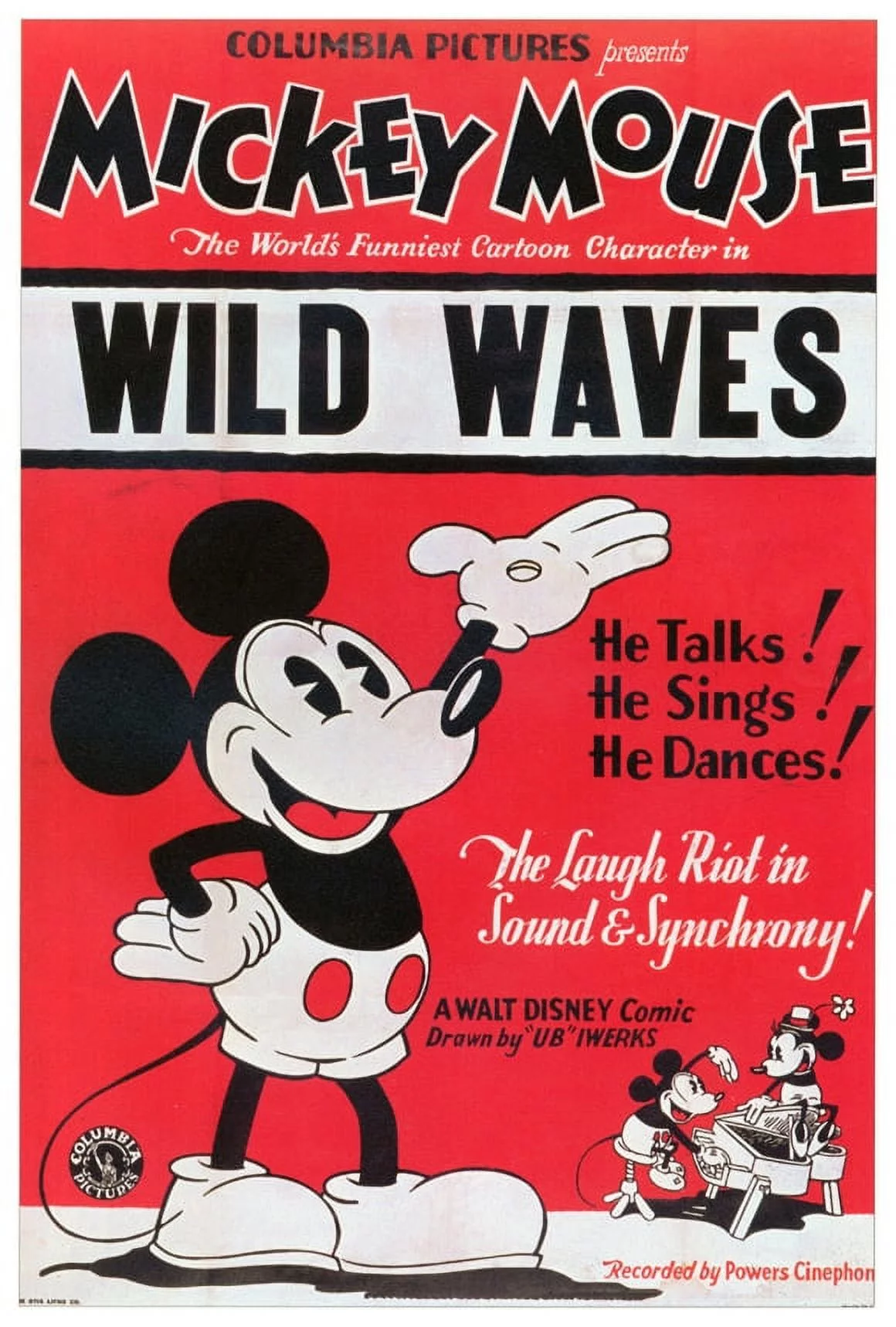
- Theatrical release poster
- Directed by: Burt Gillett
- Produced by: Walt Disney
- Starring: Walt Disney; Carl Stalling; Marjorie Ralston
- Music by: Carl Stalling
- Animation by: Ub Iwerks
- Production company: Disney Cartoons
- Distributed by: Celebrity Productions
- Release date: December 18, 1929
- Running time: 7:07
- Country: United States
- Language: English

Wild Waves is a 1929 American animated short film directed by Burt Gillett. It is the fifteenth film in the Mickey Mouse series and the last to be distributed by Celebrity Productions. Columbia Pictures reissued the film after Disney Cartoons, renamed to Walt Disney Productions, switched distributors immediately after the film's release.

== Plot ==
The full short.

Mickey Mouse is a lifeguard, sitting on his beach chair and playing the banjo to amuse an appreciative audience of ducks, pelicans, penguins, and sea lions. To his annoyance, the chair dances along. Singing "My Bonnie Lies over the Ocean", Minnie Mouse changes into a bathing costume and walks to the edge of the beach. A huge wave crashes onto the beach, dragging her out to sea.

Minnie cries for help, and Mickey rushes to her rescue, swimming through the waves (and midair) to locate her. He brings her back to the beach and the audience/animals cheers. When Minnie regains consciousness, she starts to cry, clearly disoriented and frightened by the experience. Mickey comforts her and lets her blow her nose on his handkerchief. With her calmed down a bit, Mickey tells Minnie to look at him and soon begins singing and dancing to "The Sailor's Hornpipe", and the animals join in, leading to a lengthy sequence of penguins and sea lions dancing while Mickey plays an impromptu harp to "Rocked in the Cradle of the Deep", uses sticks to bang on items. A deep-voiced walrus joins in with a solo. Mickey performs the final with do-dos while tapping moving his arms and everyone, including Minnie, cheer for him. At the end of the performance, Minnie, now cheered up and happy, coos to Mickey, "My hero!" and he responds, "Oh that's nothing!" while sweeping his foot to the sand. Minnie kisses him gratefully and repeatedly on the cheek that Mickey stops her and kisses her in the lips twice, and the mice hug each other.

== Production ==
Wild Waves is the first Mickey Mouse short directed by Burt Gillett, who would direct more than 30 Mickey shorts over the next several years.

Wild Waves was the last Mickey Mouse cartoon to be animated by Ub Iwerks. It was also composer Carl Stalling's last film with the Walt Disney Studio; after this film, Stalling joined Iwerks at his new studio. This was the last short to use the original title card until Get a Horse! (2013), with Mickey in striped shorts looking at Minnie. Newer releases of this short use the new title card with Mickey's face, followed by the title of the short.

In a 1971 interview with Funnyworld magazine, Stalling said that he voiced Mickey's speaking lines in this short, as well as the singing walrus. Mickey's singing voice is much different and probably performed by Walt Disney or an anonymous studio employee. Minnie's voice was performed by a woman who worked in Ink and Paint, Marjorie Norton (later Marjorie Ralston).

The original animation from All Wet

The repurposed animation from Wild Waves

Some of the lifeguard gags in the film were recycled from an earlier Oswald the Lucky Rabbit short, All Wet (1927). The short also reused animation of Mickey saving Minnie from All Wet. The singing walrus footage was later recycled in the 1930 Silly Symphonies short Arctic Antics, and the dancing sea lions were reused in the 1931 Mickey Mouse short The Castaway.

== Reception ==
The Film Daily (January 5, 1930): "Mickey Mouse is at his best as a life saver in this Walt Disney cartoon, which is made additionally funny by the antics of singing seals, dancing penguins, baritone sea lions and other amazing creations of the moving cartoon kingdom. Actually great."

Motion Picture News (January 11, 1930): "Funny and Entertaining. Mickey Mouse plays the role of lifeguard in this clever Walt Disney sound cartoon. There are plenty of laughs when he sets out to save the fair maiden, being tossed about plenty by the wild waves. Then, to take her mind off the narrow escape he struts his musical stuff to great advantage."

Variety (January 22, 1930): "Fast-moving comedy cartoon, which isn't on long enough to bore many, no matter if it isn't always laugh provoking. Doesn't rank with the best of the recent crop, but will fit any program. It's one of the Mickey Mouse series, unwinding the usual antics of the cartoonist's imagination. Most of the action attempts to keep the rhythm of the synchronized score, but the resultant gag maneuvers not being overly strong. Some of the cartoons are mimicking the voices of the figures in certain spots, a mistake, as it rudely interrupts any illusion the drawings may have previously invoked. That's overdoing the sound thing. The cartoon one-reelers are riding in front at present, with a wealth of material to pick from to make it tough to offset their strength. Carelessness and an attempt to turn 'em out too fast can undermine as fast as the novelty of sound and a couple of great ideas sent them out as pace makers. Their main asset is that they're built for laughs, and people primarily go to the theatre for that purpose."

In A Mouse Divided: How Ub Iwerks Became Forgotten, and Walt Disney Became Uncle Walt, Jeff Ryan calls the short the best Mickey Mouse cartoon made during the Iwerks era, stating "even when their relationship was as rocky as the onscreen jetty, Walt and Ub were a team to be reckoned with". He praises it as a "near-perfect piece of animation" and for "erasing all the mistakes of the previous year. Gone are the stolen gags, mimeographed animation, and absent characterization. Mickey and Minnie are vibrant, their entire faces alive and expressive."

== Home media ==
The short was released on December 7, 2004 on Walt Disney Treasures: Mickey Mouse in Black and White, Volume Two: 1929-1935.

== Television ==
Wild Waves aired on The Mickey Mouse Club (season 1, episode 73) and Mickey's Mouse Tracks (season 1, episode 56).

== See also ==
- Mickey Mouse (film series)
