= Beach Combers =

1936 film

- Directed by: Walter Lantz
- Story by: Walter Lantz; Victor McLeod
- Produced by: Walter Lantz
- Starring: Bernice Hansen
- Music by: James Dietrich
- Animation by: Manuel Moreno; Lester Kline
- Color process: B&W
- Production company: Walter Lantz Productions
- Distributed by: Universal Pictures
- Release date: October 5, 1936
- Running time: 8:33
- Language: English

Beach Combers is a 1936 animated short subject by Walter Lantz Productions and features Oswald the Lucky Rabbit. It had an original copyright notice and was renewed.

== Storyline ==
One day at a beach, a family of ducks (two parents plus five ducklings) come in for a vacation. While the parents decide to rest under the warm sun, their offspring wander around to find food.

Minutes later, Oswald also comes to the beach, along with his dog Elmer the Great Dane. After finding a place to put their gear, Oswald decides to boat in the sea and fish for a few moments. Before leaving, he tells Elmer to stay and keep an eye on their belongings, especially the picnic basket.

The ducklings hardly could afford things as they don't use money that much. When it comes to obtaining food, they decide to filch from unsuspecting tourists. In this, Oswald's picnic basket becomes their target. The basket itself is next to Elmer who is seemingly asleep. One of them attempts to tiptoe toward it and open a lid, only to be slapped away by Elmer who gets up in the blink of an eye.

The little mallards attempt to lure Elmer away using a bone tied to a string. As Elmer follows and tries to take a bite, the duckling pulling the bone smashes the dog in the cranium with it. The ducklings make their move and begin feeding on the basket's goods. In no time, however, Elmer recovers and barks them away.

While the duck siblings are still figuring a way to snatch the basket, one of them play inside an old boot with an opened toe cap. Inside the toe cap are sharp nails, giving the ducklings an idea for a new modus operandi. As the duck inside the boot comes to Elmer, the curious dog decides to take a close look. When Elmer holds out his nose, the boot's toe cap closes, biting the dog with the pointy nails. While the dog twitches in pain, the ducklings nab the basket and set sail with it. Elmer takes off the boot, but it's too late.

The ducklings ride the basket at sea and eat the contents, unaware that they are being spotted by an octopus. The octopus grabs the little mallards and takes them below the surface. Elmer at first thinks of coming to their rescue but immediately turns back, recalling the theft they committed. Nevertheless, the dog's conscience prevails, and Elmer swims in the water.

Under the sea, the octopus still has the ducklings in his grasp, thinking what meal he should make out of them. Upon seeing Elmer approach, the eight-legged mollusk puts them in a clam shell, and goes to confront the dog. The octopus swings his tentacles around but Elmer is quick to dodge everything. As they clashed from one place to another, the octopus suddenly gets his legs stuck to an old mattress. Elmer uses this as a chance to get away and release the hostages.

Swimming back on the surface, Elmer carries the ducklings who in turn bring back the picnic basket. The dog and tiny mallards become friends. Happily waiting for them at the shorelines are Oswald and the ducklings' parents. When all of them are on the beach, Oswald decides to celebrate their reunion with the delicacies in the basket.

== See also ==
- Oswald the Lucky Rabbit filmography
