= The Suicide Sheik =

1929 film by Hugh Harman

- Title card
- Directed by: Hugh Harman
- Produced by: George Winkler
- Music by: Bert Fiske
- Animation by: Hugh Harman
- Color process: Black and white
- Production company: Winkler Pictures
- Distributed by: Universal Pictures
- Release date: March 18, 1929
- Running time: 5:20
- Country: United States
- Language: English

The Suicide Sheik is a 1929 American animated short film directed by Hugh Harman. It stars Oswald the Lucky Rabbit. It is one of the earliest known Oswald sound cartoons to survive with its soundtrack.

== Plot ==
The film

== See also ==
- Oswald the Lucky Rabbit filmography
