= Lovesick (1937 film) =

- Directed by: Walter Lantz; Alex Lovy
- Story by: Victor McLeod; Win Smith
- Produced by: Walter Lantz
- Starring: Bernice Hansen
- Music by: Nathaniel Shilkret; George Lessner
- Animation by: Ed Benedict; George Dane; Ted Dubois; Jack Dunham; Ray Fahringer; Laverne Harding; Les Kline; Fred Kopietz; George Nicholas; Ralph Somerville
- Color process: Black and white
- Production company: Walter Lantz Productions
- Distributed by: Universal Pictures
- Release date: October 4, 1937
- Running time: 9:47
- Language: English

Lovesick is a 1937 cartoon produced by Walter Lantz Productions featuring the later, post-1935 white-furred version of Oswald the Lucky Rabbit, together with his dog Doxie the dachshund.

== Plot ==
Oswald comes out of his house carrying a bowl filled with bones and offers them to his long-bodied dog named Doxie. Doxie was digging a hole in the yard but immediately dashes toward the bowl upon being called.

While he is enjoying his bone meal, Doxie sees a girl poodle walk by from next door. Amazed by her glamour, Doxie is obliged to establish a romantic relationship. As he enters the yard of the other house and drops by the poodle's cabin, Doxie presents a bone which he had spared from his meal. Not surprisingly, Doxie's gift is not accepted and the poodle isn't interested in meeting him. Refusing to back down, Doxie goes on to dig up all the bones in the area, including a dinosaur skeleton. After gathering up every single piece, the in-love dog attempts to offer them to his love interest. Nevertheless, the poodle's reaction is the same.

Desperate to win the poodle's affections, Doxie pretends to leave as he hides behind her cabin. As the girl dog comes out checking the outside, Doxie gives her a surprise kiss. Annoyed rather than flattered, the poodle starts barking. Suddenly, her mistress sees what is happening and runs outside to drive Doxie away, attempting to beat him with a hoe.

Doxie goes back into his yard, saddened by how things didn't go his way at the other place. Just then, Oswald comes to see him and is a bit surprised by the dog's depressive state. Oswald thinks Doxie has a serious illness and therefore takes him to a veterinarian.

At the clinic, the emu vet examines Doxie with a stethoscope and an x-ray. In no time, the vet comes out of the emergency room and tells Oswald that no trace of any illness is diagnosed but only "lovesickness". For unknown reasons, Oswald is angered by the news and opts to be the one to "cure" Doxie.

Doxie is still in the emergency room, strapped in the bed. Meanwhile, Oswald, disguised as a surgeon, steps in. As the pretend surgeon considers operation and shows an ax, Doxie is most terrified and flees the clinic. Watching through a window and seeing the frightened dog ran, Oswald is elated, thinking that Doxie is psychologically healed.

Doxie returns to the suburbs and reenters the poodle's place where he'll again resume his love urges. To his dismay, as the poodle comes out of her doghouse, he sees some puppies also come out along with a bulldog whom she gave the pups birth with. The long-bodied dog understands everything and walks away.

Doxie is most disgusted and therefore abandons his pursuit for love. He returns to his yard, going back to his usual lifestyle. Once more Oswald comes to him, offering a bowl full of bones. As he nibbles on a bone, Doxie decides he's better off with his owner.

== Doxie ==
Doxie is Oswald's second dog, the first being Elmer the Great Dane. The dachshund first made the screen in The Wily Weasel (1937). His swan song was in Soup to Mutts (1939). Though retired from animated cartoons that year, Doxie appeared in the cover of an Oswald the Rabbit comic book.

== See also ==
- Oswald the Lucky Rabbit filmography
