= Grandma's Pet =

1932 film

- Directed by: Walter Lantz; Bill Nolan
- Story by: Walter Lantz; Bill Nolan
- Produced by: Walter Lantz
- Starring: Joe E. Brown; Fred Avery
- Music by: James Dietrich
- Animation by: Manuel Moreno; Ray Abrams; Lester Kline; Fred Avery; Vet Anderson
- Color process: Black and white
- Production company: Universal Cartoon Studios
- Distributed by: Universal Pictures
- Release date: January 18, 1932
- Running time: 7:23
- Language: English

Grandma's Pet is an animated short film by Walter Lantz Productions and is part of the Oswald the Lucky Rabbit series. It is the 53rd Lantz Oswald cartoon and the 106th cartoon overall.

== Plot ==
One night, Oswald is reading to three kittens the story of Little Red Riding Hood. After reading his book, he falls to sleep in his bed.

Oswald then dreams of the live female stuffed doll (his second girlfriend in the series) being like the title character of the story he just read: walking through the woods in a red hood and carrying a basket. He even dreams of himself in the scene, accompanying her. On the way, they meet a large wolf who desperately wants a share of the goods in the doll's basket. The doll, however, declines and tells the wolf that what's inside was for her grandmother. The wolf is disgusted and thinks of a way to obtain the contents.

As Oswald and the doll go on walking, the wolf decides to reach the grandmother's home before them which is part of his plan. The wolf invades the house and harasses the old lady before putting her in a freezer. He then disguises himself in a nightgown and tucks himself into the bed.

When the two little friends finally arrive at the house, the doll proceeds to the bedroom while Oswald stays near the door. While the rabbit waits, a rat came to and tells him to open the freezer. Oswald opens it and is shocked to find the real grandmother trapped in a block of ice. In the bedroom, the doll eventually realizes who she's speaking to and begins to make her run as the wolf aggressively goes forth.

In no time, the wolf gets his hands on the doll and takes her basket which he finds a magic wand inside. Before Oswald could intervene, he magically sends the rabbit into a skyscraper area, dangling on two clotheslines. The wolf then teleports Oswald onto an elevated railway with an incoming train, then into the mouth of a whale, and finally into a shooting gallery with firing shooters. He and the doll (still in his grasp) are in every place Oswald is transported to, but at safer locations.

Finding his way out of the shooters' gunfire, Oswald is able to take the wand and teleports everybody back to the grandmother's place. When they return to the house, the wolf, for some reason, is lying on a table unconscious. Oswald then uses the wand to transform their tormentor into a large roasted turkey. The grandmother, who is finally defrosted, comes to the dining room and decides to have a meal of what's on the table. For a job well done, Oswald and the doll kiss each other.

Morning comes and Oswald wakes up from his dream. He is, however, surprised to see that what he had been kissing was a cow that sticks its head in the window.

== Availability ==
The cartoon is available on the Woody Woodpecker and Friends Classic Cartoon Collection DVD box set.

== See also ==
- Oswald the Lucky Rabbit filmography
