= King Klunk =

1933 film

- Pooch and his girlfriend about to photograph King Klunk.
- Directed by: Walter Lantz
- Story by: Walter Lantz
- Produced by: Walter Lantz
- Starring: Joe Twerp; Tex Avery; Elvia Allman
- Music by: James Dietrich
- Animation by: Manuel Moreno; Lester Kline; Fred Kopietz; Charles Hastings; Ernest Smythe
- Color process: B&W
- Production company: Walter Lantz Productions
- Distributed by: Universal Pictures
- Release date: September 4, 1933
- Running time: 9 minutes
- Country: United States
- Language: English

King Klunk is a 1933 animated short film, produced and directed by Walter Lantz. It stars Pooch the Pup and is the twelfth of the thirteen cartoons featuring that character. The cartoon is a parody of the RKO feature King Kong, which premiered six months earlier to this cartoon's release on September 4, 1933, from Universal Pictures.

== Plot ==
Pooch and his girlfriend, Poodles Hound, sail into Africa, looking to take photographs of King Klunk, the largest gorilla in the planet.

On the continent, the native "Hot Cha Tribe" are doing a dance ritual as well as preparing a meal for their gigantic gorilla leader. The centerpiece of the meal is a lady native sitting in the middle of the platter, dejected at her role as a sacrifice. King Klunk immediately shows up, excited to get his lunch, but when Klunk sees that the amount of food in the platter is inadequate, he rejects it. While considering what he should feed on, the hungry gorilla sees Pooch and Poodles walk by from several yards away. King Klunk then quietly captures Poodles and replaces her with the lady native.

Pooch, unaware of the exchange, still carries on in his exploration. He even holds the hand of the lady native. When he looks back, the pup realizes and is most surprised. As he runs, the lady native starts following him, wanting to make Pooch her date.

When King Klunk has Poodles in his grasp and is ready to devour her, a native cupid suddenly appears and shoots him with an arrow. At this, rather than eating her, the love-stricken gorilla chooses to merely hold Poodles and give her warm smiles.

Pooch continues running until he loses the lady native. As he runs again, Pooch, without noticing, runs up to the top of King Klunk. The gorilla immediately sees and blows him away where he falls into a pond.

In the pond, Pooch swims toward what looks like a harmless boulder extending above the surface, but the rock is actually a dinosaur that rises.

The dinosaur chases Pooch on land but couldn't keep track of its prey. After losing Pooch, the dinosaur then sees Poodles still being held by King Klunk, and therefore wants to make a meal out of her.

Not wanting to relinquish anything, King Klunk puts Poodles safely on a tree and goes on to brawl with the dinosaur. The two beasts trade attacks. Eventually, King Klunk comes out the victor.

When Poodles is back in King Klunk's paw, Pooch swings on jungle vines and rescues her. The two dogs swing their way onto a plateau. As the gorilla goes after them, Pooch and Poodles find a giant egg on a nest and push it toward their chaser. Upon being pinned down by the egg, King Klunk is motionless and admits defeat.

Instead of taking pictures, Pooch and Poodles tie King Klunk to the back of their boat and pull him across the Atlantic. They decide to take their creature to the United States.

On American soil, King Klunk, in chains, is presented at a theater where spectators come to see him. Suddenly, the chimpanzee cupid reappears and shoots him with another arrow. His mood is again changed from bored to in-love. King Klunk once again set sights on Poodles and starts straining the chains. The spectators panic and flee the theater.

King Klunk is able to escape and starts chasing the crowd on the main street. He eventually finds Poodles, picks her up, and climbs the Empire State Building.

Determined to salvage his sweetheart, Pooch boards a fighter plane and takes off. The little dog then fires his machine gun and cannon at the scaling gorilla. After landing several impacts, Pooch ultimately brings down King Klunk who falls from the building and falls to his death. Pooch and Poodles are together again.

== Reception ==
Motion Picture Herald (September 23, 1933): "Pooch the Pup and his girl in Africa, when a giant ape captures the girl. Pooch rescues her, and they bring back the ape to exhibit in a sideshow. Everything goes well until the ape breaks loose, captures the girl again and escapes to the top of a skyscraper with her. Pooch effects another rescue, via a cartoonist's idea of an aeroplane and destroys the monster. It is an amusing takeoff in cartoon form on King Kong".

== Availability ==
The short is available on The Woody Woodpecker and Friends Classic Cartoon Collection DVD box set.
