= Hold 'Em Ozzie! =

1929 film by Rollin Hamilton

- Title card
- Directed by: Rollin Hamilton
- Produced by: George Winkler
- Music by: Bert Fiske
- Animation by: Rollin Hamilton
- Color process: Black and white
- Production company: Winkler Pictures
- Distributed by: Universal Pictures
- Release date: March 4, 1929
- Running time: 5:42
- Country: American
- Language: English

Hold 'Em Ozzie! is a 1929 American animationanimated short film directed by Rollin Hamilton. It stars Oswald the Lucky Rabbit. It is one of the earliest known Oswald sound cartoons to survive, though the soundtrack remains lost. It was rediscovered in 2016.

== Plot ==
The film

== See also ==
- Oswald the Lucky Rabbit filmography
