= Hypnotic Hick =

- Directed by: Supervision: Don Patterson; Technical director: William Garity
- Story by: Homer Brightman
- Produced by: Walter Lantz
- Starring: Dal McKennon; Grace Stafford (both uncredited)
- Music by: Clarence Wheeler
- Animation by: Ken Southworth; Ray Abrams; Laverne Harding; Robert Bentley; Herman Cohen; Gil Turner
- Backgrounds by: Raymond Jacobs; Art Landy
- Color process: Technicolor
- Production company: Walter Lantz Productions
- Distributed by: Universal International
- Release date: September 26, 1953
- Running time: 6:25
- Country: United States
- Language: English

Hypnotic Hick is a 1953 Woody Woodpecker cartoon supervised by Don Patterson. The film was produced by Walter Lantz Productions and released on September 26, 1953 by Universal International.

The short is notable for being the first and only Woody Woodpecker cartoon to be produced in 3D, in an attempt to cash in on the stereoscopic craze started with the film Bwana Devil. Much of the staff credited besides Patterson and William Garity are credited in the short as Artists.

== Plot ==
While happily roller skating, Woody gets bullied by an angry Buzz Buzzard, who has just avoided being served a summons. Thinking the woodpecker might want to seek mild revenge on Buzz, law officer I. Gypem tells Woody he will pay him a dollar to serve Buzz with the summons.

Woody happily accepts the offer from Gypem, but Buzz manages to stop all attempts at delivering the summons. Woody then stumbles on a book about hypnotism, which declares: "Influence others and be their master". Woody reads the book cover to cover, and then decides to "practice" his newly acquired skill on Buzz. At first, he has some fun by putting the reluctant buzzard to sleep. Then, Woody turns him into a dog, a monkey, and appropriately enough, a woodpecker.

Finally, Woody blindfolds himself, begins walking on a skyscraper skeleton and tells Buzz (who has been fitted with Woody's roller skates), "I am your master. You must protect me at all times". The two encounter several death-defying close calls before Woody manages to secure Buzz and escort him to I. Gypem's office.

Supposedly thankful, Gypem has the audacity to serve Woody with a summons, accusing the woodpecker of "practicing hypnotism out of season". Incensed, Woody hypnotizes Buzz into thinking he is a hungry giant and Gypem is a tasty ham sandwich. While Buzz chases Gypem out of the office and into the city, Woody celebrates his victory by throwing the money into the air and doing his trademark laugh.

== Notes ==
- Hypnotic Hick introduced another rendition of "The Woody Woodpecker Song", which first appeared in the 1948 film Wet Blanket Policy. This rendition, featuring a prominent trumpet and piano riff, would become the de facto version, regularly appearing until 1961's Franken-Stymied.
- Hypnotic Hick was also the first time Woody began speaking more regularly since 1949's Drooler's Delight. Prior to this short, Woody was portrayed as silent since Grace Stafford started supplying voice for the character in 1951, with the occasional line or two cropping up beginning with Stage Hoax.
- Hypnotic Hick has a unique opening sequence which highlights the presence of the 3D technique. Woody first bursts through a background tree, with the flying sawdust forming his name. Then Woody pops out of another tree, moves extremely close to the screen, and delivers his trademark laugh. This special opening was used only for this film.
