= Springtime Serenade =

- Oswald and his sister open their inn for Spring
- Directed by: Walter Lantz
- Story by: Walter Lantz; Bill Nolan
- Produced by: Walter Lantz
- Starring: The Rhythmettes; Bernice Hansen
- Music by: James Dietrich
- Animation by: Manuel Moreno; Lester Kline; Fred Kopietz; Bill Mason; Laverne Harding
- Color process: Technicolor
- Distributed by: Universal Pictures
- Release date: May 27, 1935
- Running time: 8:08
- Language: English

Springtime Serenade is a 1935 short cartoon made by Walter Lantz Productions and features Oswald the Lucky Rabbit. While most shorts in the series are shot in black and white, this one is among the very few that are in color.

== Plot ==
After a long winter in the countryside, the snow finally melted and the animals come out of hibernation. A squirrel merrily runs around and heads to the groundhog's house to tell the latter of the good news.

Upon coming out and hearing what the squirrel told him, the groundhog turns around and is surprised to see his shadow on the wall of his house. He then warns the squirrel and the other animals nearby that if his shadow is visible, more days of snow await. The other animals, however, are doubtful of his advice and therefore take it as a joke.

On another part of the countryside, Oswald and an unnamed sister of his are working on their inn after it had been closed for the winter. They dust the furniture and shake the dirt off the carpets. After completing their tasks, the inn is ready for service. Oswald and his sister go outside for a little stroll.

As the two inn operators are at the open and spending time with some animals, the groundhog approaches and warns them once more about more winter days coming. Again, they all think to be just a bluff and begin to laugh, but they laughing when snowflakes fall to the ground. Finally realizing the truth of the groundhog's warning, everybody hurried back indoors.

== Availability ==
The short is available on The Woody Woodpecker and Friends Classic Cartoon Collection: Volume 2 DVD box set.

== See also ==
- Oswald the Lucky Rabbit filmography
- Cartune Classics
