= The Ol' Swimmin' Hole =

1928 film by Walt Disney

Africa Before Dark
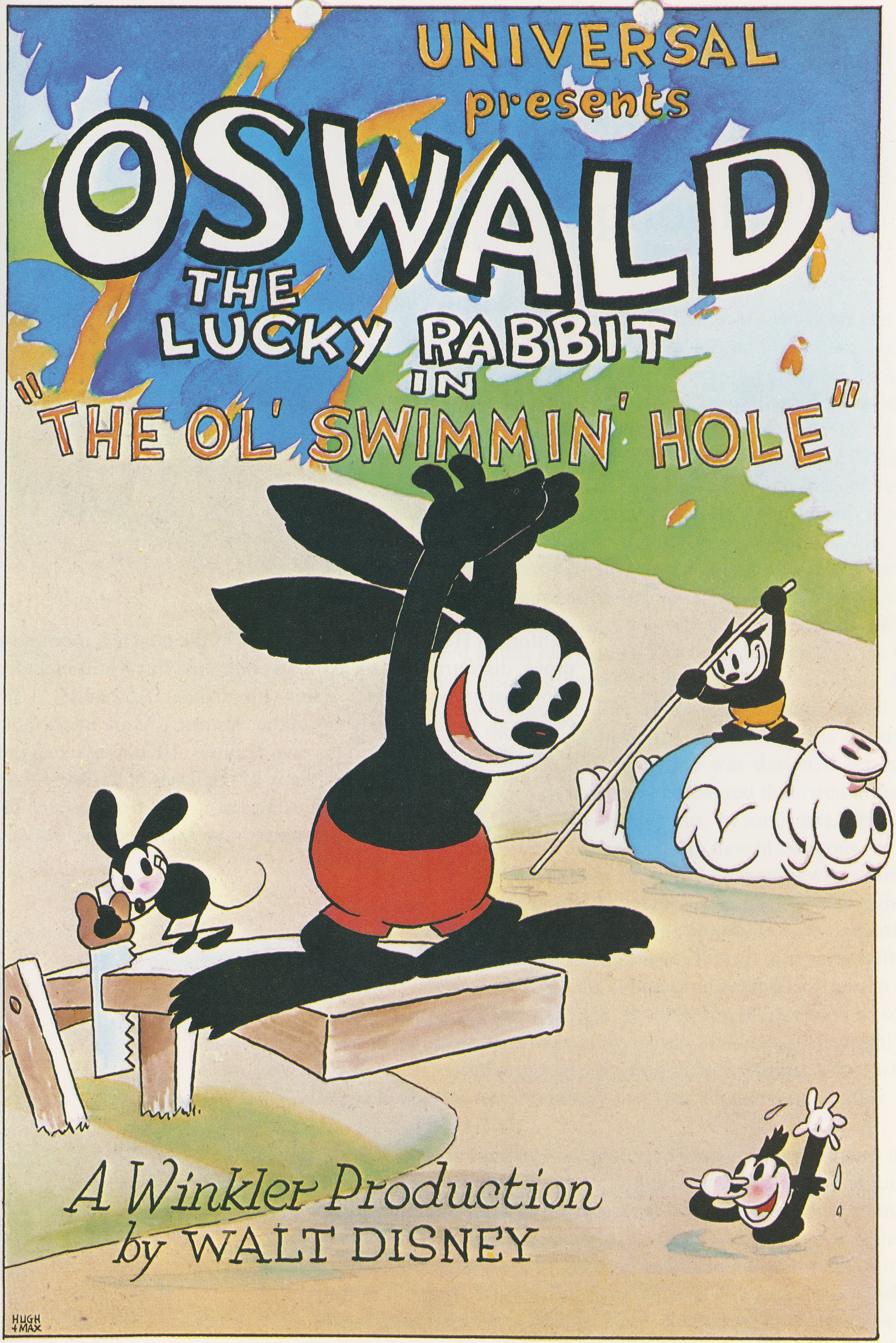
- Poster
- Directed by: Walt Disney
- Produced by: Charles Mintz; George Winkler
- Animation by: Hugh Harman; Rollin Hamilton
- Color process: Black and white
- Production company: Winkler Pictures
- Distributed by: Universal Pictures
- Release date: February 20, 1928
- Running time: 6 minutes
- Country: United States
- Language: Silent

The Ol' Swimming Hole is a 1928 American animated comedy short film directed by Walt Disney. It features Oswald the Lucky Rabbit.

== Plot ==
Full short

== Releases ==
The short was released on February 6, 1928, by Universal Pictures.

The film was thought to be lost until an incomplete print was found by David Gerstein in Belgium; the ending remains lost.
