= Wild and Woolly (1932 film) =

1932 film

- Directed by: Bill Nolan
- Produced by: Walter Lantz
- Starring: Bernice Hansen; Fred Avery
- Music by: James Dietrich
- Animation by: Ray Abrams; Fred Avery; Bill Weber; Jack Carr; Charles Hastings
- Color process: Black and white
- Production company: Walter Lantz Productions
- Distributed by: Universal Pictures
- Release date: November 21, 1932
- Running time: 6:44
- Language: English

Wild and Woolly is a 1932 American Western short animated film by Walter Lantz Productions. It stars Oswald the Lucky Rabbit.

== Plot ==
In a town in the Old West, the girl beagle comes to a bank to make a deposit. The banker is none other than Oswald the Lucky Rabbit. Momentarily a gun-slinging rottweiler also comes to the bank, and causes a frenzy, even shoving an umbrella down an old woman's throat. Oswald flees the bank with the girl beagle's money.

Oswald leaves town on a horse, although he is being followed by the rottweiler who is also on a horse. The chase continues until they reach a cabin which Oswald enters, but the house is occupied by a thin dog who is an accomplice of the rottweiler. After the rottweiler breaks in, another frenzy ensues until the thin dog gets thrown out of the cabin. Nearby buzzards eat at the thin dog until that canine is nothing but a skeleton. Back in the cabin, Oswald is still having trouble with the rottweiler. To protect the girl beagle's cash, Oswald swallows the sack. The rottweiler punches Oswald. The punch sends Oswald bouncing off the walls until he knocks off a goat's skull that falls on and covers his head. Oswald uses the skull to bash the rottweiler around and out of the cabin before locking the door. The rottweiler tries to break back in using a log. Upon doing so, the rottweiler overshoots and falls into a canyon which is on the other side of the house. The rottweiler ends up in the bottom, getting pummeled by two jaguars.

Oswald is seen just outside the cabin relaxed. He is momentarily greeted and approached by the girl beagle. When Oswald tries to kiss her, the girl beagle asks for her money. Oswald manages to pull out the sack through his mouth. The rabbit and his canine girlfriend go on with the kissing.

== Reused animation ==
The part where Oswald bounces off the walls is reused from A Wet Knight.

== Other spellings ==
In a Guild/Firelight Video reissue, the film is presented as Wild and Wooly. In Michael Fitzgerald's book Universal Pictures, it is mentioned as Wild and Wooley.
