= Puppet Show (film) =

- Directed by: Walter Lantz
- Story by: Walter Lantz; Victor McLeod
- Produced by: Walter Lantz
- Starring: Billy Bletcher
- Music by: James Dietrich
- Animation by: Manuel Moreno
- Color process: B&W
- Production company: Walter Lantz Productions
- Distributed by: Universal Pictures
- Release date: November 2, 1936
- Running time: 8 min.
- Language: English

Puppet Show is a 1936 short film from Walter Lantz Productions and stars Oswald the Lucky Rabbit. Unlike most shorts made by the studio, the film employs both animation and live-action.

== Storyline ==
Oswald, still depicted in the white fur he got fourteen cartoons ago, is putting up a marionette puppet show. The first act consists of an Arab man attempting to charm a snake out of the basket. The second act shows a pair of Spanish dancers. The third act features an African American quartet: one playing the piano, one singing while sitting on it, and two doing tap dancing. Things were going well for Oswald until a bee disturbingly hovers around him. The bunny tries to shoo away the insect, only to end up getting stung in the rear. Oswald then jumps off his stool in pain and quickly moves backward. After colliding the wall behind the stage, a vase drops on his head, putting the daylights out of him. For several minutes, the rabbit remains out cold, leaving his puppets lying on the stage.

Oswald dreams about two of his puppets, the African American tap dancers, being alive. After being kept in an auditorium for a long time with no one to play with them, one of the puppets expresses desire to freely wander the world. The other, however, warns that the outside may not be safe and that they can't do much unless someone moves their strings. The freedom-hungry puppet does not buy the advice and therefore makes the move.

The puppet sets foot just outside the auditorium. He tries to dance but his moves are limited. Realizing the truth of one of the things said by his friend, the puppet attached a pack of balloons onto the holder of his strings. Thus he was able to dance better and goes on into the outside world.

The outside world visited by the puppet is populated with living toys who were intrigued to see someone suspending on strings. While he wanders, a hostile doll from afar shoots arrows at his balloons. With each one bursting, he loses control of his limbs. Finally crippled, the other toys recognize he's a puppet. The prejudiced toys express their hatred to puppets and declare "we'll saw you into blocks of wood". They tie the puppet to a table where he is about to be cut in half by a circular saw.

At last, Oswald wakes up from his slumber. He quickly returns above the stage, picks up his puppets, and continues the show.

== Reception ==
Motion Picture Herald (Oct 17, 1936): "The outstanding feature in this edition of Oswald's adventures is the exhibition of some skillful puppet work. Used as a background for the antics of the comic rabbit, such delightful puppetry lends a novel note of entertainment".

National Exhibitor (Nov 5, 1936): "The endeavor to do something different results this time in Oswald the cartoon character pulling cartoon strings of real photographed puppets, in the manner of Max Fleischer's old Out of the Inkwell series. The novelty is refreshing but the entertainment is so-so".

== Notes ==
- Oswald is animated, but the puppets he plays are live-action, except those in his dream.
- A restored version of the cartoon is featured on The Woody Woodpecker and Friends Classic Cartoon Collection: Volume 2.
