= Mechanical Man (film) =

1932 film

- Title card
- Directed by: Walter Lantz; Bill Nolan
- Story by: Walter Lantz; Bill Nolan
- Produced by: Walter Lantz
- Starring: Tex Avery; Walter Lantz
- Music by: James Dietrich
- Animation by: Manuel Moreno; Lester Kline; Ray Abrams; Tex Avery; Vet Anderson
- Color process: Black and white
- Production company: Universal Cartoon Studios
- Distributed by: Universal Pictures
- Release date: February 15, 1932
- Running time: 6:13
- Language: English

Mechanical Man is a 1932 cartoon short by Walter Lantz that features Oswald the Lucky Rabbit. It is the 54th Oswald short by Lantz and the 107th in the entire series.

== Plot ==
Full short

The cartoon begins inside a house. In it, Oswald and his girlfriend Kitty are playing a piano together. On their instrument are a dancing candle stand and two mice playing the accordion.

At a laboratory only a few miles away, Peg Leg Pete completes construction of a robot and activates it. To his surprise, the robot begins to swing punches at him. Pete, however, is able to evade the attacks and stops the humanoid machine with a punch of his own. He soon learns that his creation needs one more thing: a heart.

Back in Oswald's place, the two friends decide to play hide-and-seek. Oswald is "it" and Kitty is the one to hide. While the rabbit counts, his playmate looks for a hiding place. Without warning, Kitty gets captured through an opened window by Pete who then leaves a sack inside before fleeing. Convinced that she is hiding in the bag, Oswald approaches and opens it. To his amusement, what comes out is a marching flute player. As the rabbit goes to find his friend, he notices a strand of thread on the window sill which he follows. The thread is in fact the trousers of the mad scientist who later appears in spotted shorts.

At the laboratory, Peg Leg has Kitty wedged in a vise and attempts to perform surgery on her, by taking out her heart and placing it in the robot. Before he can start, the nefarious inventor sees through his surveillance device that someone has arrived at his facility.

Oswald reaches the entrance to the laboratory after following the whole thread. Upon knocking on the door, a trap activates, causing him to fall into a chute, leading towards the basement. In an attempt to slaughter Oswald, Pete waits for the little rabbit's arrival at other end of the shoot, preparing to swing an axe. The mad scientist swings but misses. From there, the chase begins.

Oswald runs through several corridors of the laboratory. While approaching an intersection, he sees something white popping in and out of the left corner. To defend himself, Oswald picks up a nearby urn. There is indeed a skeleton innocently sitting on a rocking chair by the left corner, but Pete, who was coming from the corridor in that direction, pulls it away, and walks into the intersection. Upon seeing what has entered his hallway, Oswald tosses the urn. Pete is struck right in the head and is knocked cold. Oswald finds a rope and ties one end of it around his pursuer's leg, with the other end around a lion's tail. The lion runs in place, hanging the mad scientist above the floor.

Oswald, at last, finds the chamber where Kitty was held. He loosens the vise and frees her. Later, a goat comes along and pulls a mechanical part out of his mouth and drops it. Oswald and Kitty both laugh about it.

== Copyright status ==
The copyright for Mechanical Man expired in 1960 and it is in the public domain. A number of Oswald shorts and other cartoons produced by Walter Lantz Productions also ended up in similar status.

== Differences in the VHS version ==
Walter Lantz and Universal released the cartoon on a VHS video tape on public known as the Guild/Firelight reissue print (VHS; Video Yesteryear), which had better quality and better audio, but still had the re-used title. However, many scenes were cut, like the scene where Pete says "This thing needs a human heart, I'll get one"; the scene where Pete tells a skunk to "get busy"; and the final scene cut shows Pete taking the heart out of Kitty's mouth, but the heart later gets back in. Even though it was released on VHS, it was never released on DVD at all, or its first re-used version print or even the original version of the print at all. The channel Walter's Lance showed these censored scenes in good quality, formerly the only copy without the censors was also a reissue of Guild/ Firelight, only with the screen as too blurry.

== Adaptations ==
Other animators created their own versions of this story. The characters that starred in those versions include Mickey Mouse, Bosko, Scrappy, and Flip the Frog.

== See also ==
- Oswald the Lucky Rabbit filmography
