= Jolly Little Elves =

- Directed by: Manuel Moreno
- Produced by: Walter Lantz
- Starring: Bernice Hansen (uncredited)
- Music by: James Dietrich (uncredited); Walter Lantz; Victor McLeod
- Animation by: Laverne Harding; Lester Kline; Fred Kopietz; Bill Mason; Manuel Moreno
- Color process: Technicolor
- Production company: Walter Lantz Productions
- Distributed by: Universal Pictures
- Release date: October 1, 1934
- Running time: 8 min.
- Language: English

Jolly Little Elves is a 1934 animated short film by Walter Lantz. The cartoon was nominated at the 7th Academy Awards for Best Animated Short Film. The short was part of Lantz's Cartune Classics series.

== Summary ==
Jolly Little Elves is a retelling of The Elves and the Shoemaker with the elves this time loving to eat donuts and drink coffee.

== See also ==
- Cartune Classics
