= A Wet Knight =

1932 film

- Oswald and Kitty boating in the lake.
- Directed by: Walter Lantz; Bill Nolan
- Story by: Walter Lantz; Bill Nolan
- Produced by: Walter Lantz
- Starring: Shirley Reed; Bernice Hansen
- Music by: James Dietrich
- Animation by: Manuel Moreno; Ray Abrams; Fred Avery; Bill Weber; Vet Anderson; Lester Kline; Bunny Ellison
- Color process: Black and white
- Production company: Walter Lantz Productions
- Distributed by: Universal Pictures
- Release date: June 20, 1932
- Running time: 8:45
- Language: English

A Wet Knight is an animated short film starring Oswald the Lucky Rabbit and produced by Walter Lantz. It is the 61st Oswald short produced by Lantz and the 113th overall.

== Storyline ==
Oswald and Kitty are boating in the lake. To spice up their trip, Oswald plays a guitar. Suddenly, it starts to rain, and night falls rather quickly. The rainstorm is so heavy that their boat splits in half and sinks. However, land is just nearby as Oswald and Kitty jump to their safety.

Looking for shelter in the midst of the forest that night, Oswald and Kitty find an abandoned castle. The two become curious about what's inside, and they make their move through the entrance. Upon entering, the castle's entrance door closes by itself, and they are quite surprised.

The first of the bizarre things they encounter are a trio of bear-like images made of fog. Oswald and Kitty tremble for a moment but breathe a sigh of relief when the fog characters dissipate.

Meanwhile, a mutated gorilla arrives just outside the castle. Although lightning bombards around it several times, the large creature is able to dodge every strike. The gorilla then proceeds into the castle.

Back inside, Oswald and Kitty see a faint cloudy image of a person playing the harpsichord. This time, they are less afraid. The rabbit attempts to touch the humanoid image but can't as if he is contacting thin air. Just then, the mutated gorilla shows up behind them. The ghostly harpsichord player flees. Insisting that the huge ape is just another illusion, Oswald tries to punch it. He then realizes that the gorilla is real when he feels its presence. Oswald and Kitty hurriedly flee.

After dashing through some of the castle's hallways for a few seconds, Oswald tells Kitty to hide in a casket while he goes around looking for weaponry. When Oswald leaves, however, a skeleton comes by and steps inside the casket, thus scaring Kitty away.

As he goes on walking, Oswald picks up an axe and decides to take on the huge ape. When they meet, Oswald swings his weapon and the gorilla is intimidated. Before the rabbit can land a blow, the head of the axe falls off.

Disarmed, Oswald retreats and quickly returns to the casket where he left his friend. Upon opening the coffin's lid, he is surprised that the doll isn't there but only the skeleton that took over.

Kitty is just a few corridors ahead of her partner. Upon hearing loud noises getting nearer, she hides into a chamber near a dead end and locks its door. Oswald tries to enter that room, assuming his friend was inside, but no one opens. As the gorilla closes in on the rabbit, Kitty finally opens the door and gives Oswald a double-tubed rifle. Oswald uses the gun but the bullets just drop out of the rifle's end rather than being fired.

In doubt of what he should do, Oswald puts a small wooden stave between his neck and shoulder, and challenges the gorilla to knock it off. The gorilla throws a right hook and Oswald is sent bouncing off the walls, but the stave remains in place. The gorilla then flicks the tiny piece of wood off with its finger which worked. Little does the gorilla know that the flicked stave starts knocking down a number of nearby ornaments. This domino effect leads to toppling a statue holding a torch, causing it to light the fuse of a cannon which is aimed at the gorilla. The gorilla sees this and quickly ducks. The cannon bounces off the wall and the gorilla blows a raspberry. The cannon hears this, heads back towards the gorilla and kicks it in the rear. The gorilla then responds by slapping the ball, which triggers an explosion, reducing the gorilla to a skeleton. Kitty, at last, comes out of the chamber and exaggeratedly gives Oswald kisses.

This is the last time Oswald had a regular voice actor.

== Reused animation ==
The part where Kitty's heart is pounding with fear is reused from The Fisherman.
