= All Wet (1927 film) =

1927 film by Ub Iwerks

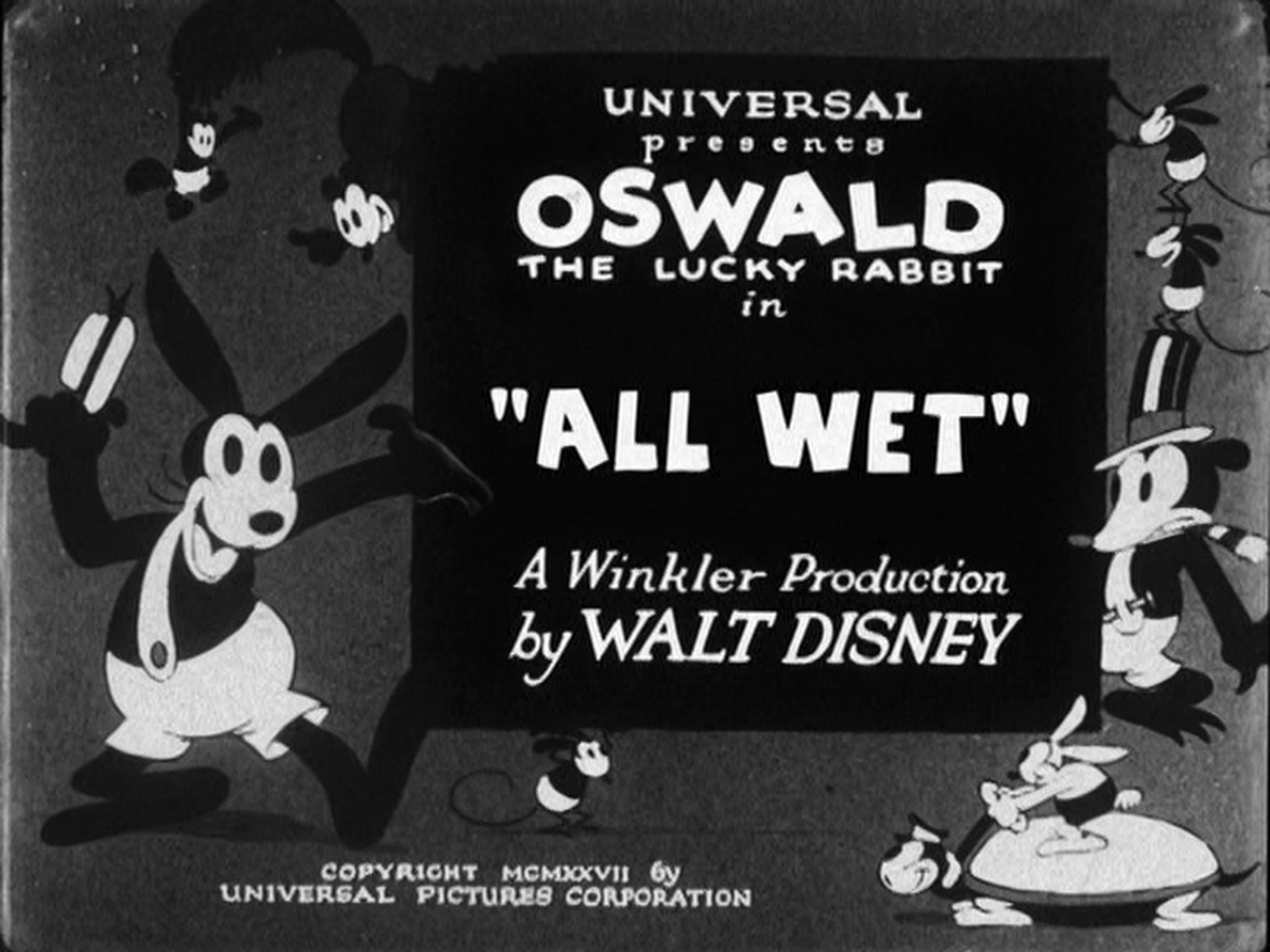
- Title card
- Directed by: Ub Iwerks
- Story by: Walt Disney
- Produced by: Charles Mintz; George Winkler
- Animation by: Ub Iwerks; Hugh Harman; Les Clark; Friz Freleng; Ben Clopton; Norm Blackburn; Rollin "Ham" Hamilton
- Color process: Black-and-white
- Production company: Winkler Pictures
- Distributed by: Universal Pictures
- Release date: October 31, 1927
- Running time: 6:39
- Country: United States
- Language: No dialogue spoken

All Wet is a 1927 American animated comedy short film directed by Ub Iwerks. The film was reissued in 1932 by Universal Pictures with added music and sound effects and is the only known version to survive. The short entered the public domain on January 1, 2023.

== Plot ==
The short from 1927

Oswald the Rabbit is selling sentient hot dogs at the beach, using his ears to swat away mice who attempt to steal them. A dog buys a hot dog, unsuccessfully trying to eat it, only to let it leave out of compassion. Oswald then sees a girl he likes, Fanny, and he closes down his hot dog stand to go and impress her. She is pretending not to be interested in Oswald, so Oswald bribes a lifeguard to surrender his post, despite not being qualified for the job. Fanny becomes more enamored seeing Oswald as a lifeguard and then she decides to test Oswald's abilities by rowing a boat into the ocean and calling out for help. As Oswald rows out to help her, Fanny gets attacked by a big fish. Oswald and Fanny are then shot back to shore by a wave. Oswald resuscitates an unconscious Fanny by rolling her up multiple times before they kiss.

== Legacy ==
The original animation from All Wet

The remade animation from Wild Waves

The short features Oswald selling hot dogs, the gag would be similarly re-used in the Mickey Mouse short, The Karnival Kid, in 1929. The aforementioned cartoon was the ninth Mickey cartoon released following his creation, which came after Walt Disney lost the rights to Oswald. Animation used during the sequence where Oswald rescues Miss Rabbit would later be remade during Wild Waves.

== Home media ==
The short was released on December 11, 2007 on Walt Disney Treasures: The Adventures of Oswald the Lucky Rabbit. A restored version of the short was released on Disney+ in September 2023 as part of Disney's 100th Anniversary.
