= Don Patterson (animator) =

American producer, animator and director (1909–1998)

- Born: December 26, 1909; Chicago, Illinois, U.S.
- Died: December 12, 1998 (aged 88); Santa Barbara, California, U.S.
- Occupations: Animator, director, producer, storyboard artist, writer
- Employer(s): The Charles Mintz Studio (1930-1933); Universal Cartoon Studios (1933-1935); Walt Disney Productions (1935–1946); MGM (1946–1950); Walter Lantz Productions (1950-1960); Hanna-Barbera Productions, Inc. (1960–1989)

Don Patterson (December 26, 1909 - December 12, 1998) was an American producer, animator, and director who worked at various studios during the Golden age of American animation, including Walt Disney Productions, the Metro-Goldwyn-Mayer cartoon department, Walter Lantz Productions, Grantray-Lawrence Animation, and Hanna-Barbera. He was the older brother of animator Ray Patterson.

== Career ==
Patterson began his career in the early 1930s as an in-betweener at the Charles Mintz Studio, and then moved to Universal Cartoon Studios.

He began working at the Walt Disney Studios in 1935, contributing to Disney's short subjects as well as their to five theatrical films: Pinocchio, Fantasia (Night on Bald Mountain/Ave Maria Segment), Dumbo, The Three Caballeros and Make Mine Music. Patterson eventually left Disney in 1946 and moved to the Metro-Goldwyn-Mayer cartoon department. Initially he worked with William Hanna and Joseph Barbera on Tom and Jerry (the same unit as his brother Ray worked in) before moving to a unit headed by Michael Lah and Preston Blair to animate three Barney Bear shorts. He left MGM after the Lah and Blair unit was disbanded by management not long after.

In the early 1950s, Patterson returned to Universal as the animation studio was now called Walter Lantz Productions and became one of Lantz's four key animators, along with Ray Abrams, Laverne Harding and Paul Smith. He would eventually become a director himself in 1952. Leonard Maltin, in his book Of Mice and Magic, said that Patterson showed great aptitude for the assignment. His shorts are praised for showcasing a level of ambition and smart storytelling despite working with more meager budgets compared to MGM. His better remembered shorts include Termites from Mars (1952), Hypnotic Hick (1953), Socko in Morocco, Alley to Bali, A Fine Feathered Frenzy and Convict Concerto (all 1954). Patterson was eventually demoted back to an animator when Tex Avery was brought in to direct a few shorts. He would continue to animate for Lantz until 1960, when he moved to Hanna-Barbera.

Patterson won a Golden Award at the 1985 Motion Pictures Screen Cartoonists Awards.

Patterson died on December 12, 1998, at Santa Barbara, California, just 14 days short of his 89th birthday.

== Selected filmography ==
Year	Title	Credits
1940	Pinocchio	Animator
1940	Fantasia	Animator - Segment "Night on Bald Mountain/Ave Maria"
1941	Dumbo	Animator
1945	The Three Caballeros	Animator
1946	Make Mine Music	Effects Animator
1973	Charlotte's Web	Animator
