= Art Landy =

Arthur Charles Landmesser (May 18, 1904 – May 21, 1977) was an American animator who specialized in animation set decoration, working on over 150 animated features. After beginning his career in Disney Studio in the second half of the 1940s, he joined the Walter Lantz Studio in 1953 and worked there until the end of 1966. At Disney, he mostly worked on the series of Pluto films, and on the 1953 animated feature film Peter Pan. At Lantz, he worked on numerous Woody Woodpecker shorts.

Landy was born in Newark, New Jersey, and died in Van Nuys, California.
