= 1931 in animation =

Events in 1931 in animation.

== Films released ==
- 2 January – The Birthday Party (United States)
- 6 January – Ace of Spades (United States)
- 11 January – Popcorn (United States)
- 12 January – China (United States)
- 19 January – Big Man from the North (United States)
- 25 January:
  - Circus Time (United States)
  - Club Sandwich (United States)
- 28 January – College (United States)
- 31 January:
  - The Soup Song (United States)
  - The Village Smitty (United States)
- February – Ain't Nature Grand! (United States)
- 7 February – Teacher's Pest (United States)
- 8 February – Razzberries (United States)
- 9 February – Shipwreck (United States)
- 10 February – Birds of a Feather (United States)
- 13 February – Rodeo Dough (United States)
- 21 February – Tree Saps (United States)
- 22 February – Go West, Big Boy (United States)
- 25 February – The Milkman (United States)
- 7 March – Traffic Troubles (United States)
- 8 March – Quack, Quack (United States)
- 14 March:
  - Laughing Gas (United States)
  - The Cow's Husband (United States)
- 22 March:
  - The Brown Derby (United States)
  - The Explorer (United States)
- 23 March – The Farmer (United States)
- 27 March – The Castaway (United States)
- 4 April:
  - Swiss Movements (United States)
  - Ups 'n Downs (United States)
- 5 April – Clowning (United States)
- 6 April – The Bum Bandit (United States)
- 8 April – The Fireman (United States)
- 15 April – Down South (United States)
- 17 April – Mother Goose Melodies (United States)
- 19 April – Sing, Sing Prison (United States)
- 20 April – Sunny South (United States)
- 26 April – The Male Man (United States)
- 27 April – Disarmament Conference (United States)
- 30 April:
  - The Moose Hunt (United States)
  - Adventures of Juku The Dog (Estonia)
- 1 May – Hallowe'en (United States)
- 2 May – Ragtime Romeo (United States)
- 3 May – The Fireman's Bride (United States)
- 5 May:
  - Country School (United States)
  - Twenty Legs Under the Sea (United States)
- 16 May – Aces Up (United States)
- 17 May – The Sultan's Cat (United States)
- 18 May – The Bandmaster (United States)
- 23 May – Silly Scandals (United States)
- 25 May – The China Plate (United States)
- 29 May – Soda Poppa (United States)
- 30 May – Dumb Patrol (United States)
- 31 May – A Day to Live (United States)
- 6 June – The Delivery Boy (United States)
- 7 June – The Bull Thrower (United States)
- 13 June – Yodeling Yokels (United States)
- 14 June – 2000 B.C. (United States)
- 22 June – The Busy Beavers (United States)
- 24 June – The Herring Murder Case (United States)
- 28 June – Blues (United States)
- 29 June – Northwoods (United States)
- 7 July – Mickey Steps Out (United States)
- 11 July – Stork Market (United States)
- 12 July – By the Sea (United States)
- 13 July – The Stone Age (United States)
- 16 July – Yelp Wanted (United States)
- 18 July – Bosko's Holiday (United States)
- 24 July – Bimbo's Initiation (United States)
- 25 July:
  - The New Car (United States)
  - The Tree's Knees (United States)
- 26 July – Her First Egg (United States)
- 27 July – Radio Rhythm (United States)
- 28 July – The Cat's Out (United States)
- 1 August – Wot a Night (United States)
- 2 August – Lady, Play Your Mandolin! (United States)
- 3 August – Svengarlic (United States)
- 9 August – Jazz Mad (United States)
- 15 August – The Little Pest (United States)
- 18 August – Blue Rhythm (United States)
- 22 August – Bimbo's Express (United States)
- 23 August – Canadian Capers (United States)
- 27 August – Egyptian Melodies (United States)
- 29 August – Movie Mad (United States)
- 5 September:
  - Polar Pals (United States)
  - Smile, Darn Ya, Smile! (United States)
- 6 September – Jesse and James (United States)
- 7 September – Kentucky Belles (United States)
- 12 September – The Village Specialist (United States)
- 14 September:
  - Hot Feet (United States)
  - Weenie Roast (United States)
- 15 September – Sunday Clothes (United States)
- 18 September – Peludópolis (Argentina)
- 19 September – Bosko Shipwrecked! (United States)
- 20 September – The Champ (United States)
- 25 September – Fishin' Around (United States)
- 26 September – Jail Birds (United States)
- 28 September – Minding the Baby (United States)
- 30 September – The Clock Store (United States)
- 3 October – One More Time (United States)
- 4 October – Around the World (United States)
- 10 October:
  - The Barnyard Broadcast (United States)
  - Trouble (United States)
- 12 October – The Hunter (United States)
- 15 October – Bars and Stripes (United States)
- 16 October – The Dog Snatcher (United States)
- 17 October:
  - Africa Squeaks (United States)
  - Bosko the Doughboy (United States)
- 18 October – Jingle Bells (United States)
- 19 October – In the Shade of the Old Apple Sauce (United States)
- 21 October – You Don't Know What You're Doin'! (United States)
- 23 October – The Spider and the Fly (United States)
- 26 October – Wonderland (United States)
- 1 November – The Black Spider (United States)
- 2 November – Hash House Blues (United States)
- 5 November – The Beach Party (United States)
- 9 November – Mask-A-Raid (United States)
- 10 November – The Fox Hunt (United States)
- 11 November – Showin Off (United States)
- 14 November:
  - Bosko's Soda Fountain (United States)
  - Jungle Jam (United States)
- 15 November – China (United States)
- 16 November – Minding the Baby (United States)
- 22 November – Jack and the Beanstalk (United States)
- 28 November – Hittin' the Trail for Hallelujah Land (United States)
- 29 November – The Lorelei (United States)
- 30 November:
  - Mickey Cuts Up (United States)
  - The Hare Mail (United States)
- 1 December – The Restless Sax (United States)
- 7 December – The Fisherman (United States)
- 9 December – Mickey's Orphans (United States)
- 12 December
  - Bosko's Fox Hunt (United States)
  - Dizzy Red Riding Hood (United States)
- 13 December – Summertime (United States)
- 17 December – The Ugly Duckling (United States)
- 19 December – A Swiss Trick (United States)
- 21 December:
  - Spooks (United States)
  - The Clown (United States)
- 26 December – Red-Headed Baby (United States)
- 27 December – Aladdin's Lamp (United States)

== Events ==
=== June ===
- June 13: Harman and Ising's Lady, Play Your Mandolin!, the first Merrie Melodie cartoon, produced by Leon Schlesinger Productions premieres, Foxy makes his debut.

=== August ===
- August 15: Harman and Ising's Smile, Darn Ya, Smile! starring Foxy and produced by Leon Schlesinger Productions premieres, the title song would later be used in 1988's Who Framed Roger Rabbit.

== Births ==
=== January ===
- January 13:
  - Charles Nelson Reilly, American actor, comedian, director and drama teacher (host of Uncle Croc's Block, voice of Frank Frankenstone in The Flintstone Comedy Show, Killer in All Dogs Go to Heaven, All Dogs Go to Heaven: The Series and An All Dogs Christmas Carol, Hunch in Rock-a-Doodle, D.O.R.C. in Space Cats, Dutch Spackle in Goof Troop, King Llort in A Troll in Central Park, Mr. Dumpty in Babes in Toyland, Red Parrot Stan in Tom and Jerry: Shiver Me Whiskers, Minos in the Hercules episode "Hercules and the Minotaur", Edmund Haynes in the Rugrats episode "Game Show Didi", the Dirty Bubble in the SpongeBob SquarePants episode "Mermaid Man and Barnacle Boy II"), (d. 2007).
  - Chris Wiggins, English-born Canadian actor (voice of Thor in The Marvel Super Heroes, Mysterio in Spider-Man, Satan in The Devil and Daniel Mouse, Mr. Sun in the Strawberry Shortcake franchise, No Heart in The Care Bears Family, Narrator in the first episode of the DIC dub of Sailor Moon, Cornelius in the Babar franchise), (d. 2017).
  - Rip Taylor, American actor and comedian (voice of The Grump in Here Comes The Grump, Gene the Genie in DuckTales the Movie: Treasure of the Lost Lamp, Uncle Fester in The Addams Family, and Captain Kiddie in Tom and Jerry: The Movie), (d. 2019). His ashes were scattered at sea in Hawaii.
  - Scott Beach, American actor (voice roles in Peanuts productions, original voice of Garfield), (d. 1996).
- January 17: James Earl Jones, American actor (voice of Mufasa in The Lion King franchise, Darth Vader in the Star Wars franchise, Ommadon in The Flight of Dragons, the Emperor of the Night in Pinocchio and the Emperor of the Night, Kibosh in Casper: A Spirited Beginning, Martin Luther King Sr. in Our Friend, Martin, Santa Claus in the Recess episode "Yes Mikey, Santa Does Shave", the Mover, Serak the Preparer and narrator in The Simpsons episode "Treehouse of Terror", and Maggie Simpson in The Simpsons episode "Treehouse of Horror V"), (d. 2024).
- January 20: Shinsuke Chikaishi, Japanese voice actor (voice of Masuo Fuguta in Sazae-san, Pukko in The Amazing 3, Yoshihiko Hasegawa in Roujin Z, the Narrator in Gokū no Daibōken), (d. 2022).
- January 25: Dean Jones, American actor (voice of George Newton in Beethoven, Dean Arbagast in Batman & Mr. Freeze: SubZero, Ahasuerus in The Greatest Adventure: Stories from the Bible episode "Queen Esther", Dr. Karel in The Real Adventures of Jonny Quest episode "DNA Doomsday", Abraham Lincoln in the Nightmare Ned episode "Monster Ned", Sam Lane in the Superman: The Animated Series episode "Monkey Fun", Chauncey in the Adventures from the Book of Virtues episode "Trushworthiness"), (d. 2015).
- January 29: Richard Bakalyan, Armenian-American actor (voice of M.C. Bird in It's Tough to be a Bird, Dinky in The Fox and the Hound), (d. 2015).

=== February ===
- February 6: Rip Torn, American actor (voice of Zeus in the Hercules franchise, Lou Lo Duca in Bee Movie, M in the TripTank episode "#InsideRoy"), (d. 2019).
- February 7:
  - José Luis Beltrán Coscojuela, Spanish comics artist and animator, (d. 2013).
  - Serge Danot, French animator, film director and producer (The Magic Roundabout), (d. 1990).
- February 13: Isaac Bardavid, Brazilian actor (dub voice of Skeletor in He-Man and the Masters of the Universe and Tigger in Winnie the Pooh), (d. 2022).
- February 26: Jacques Rouxel, French animator (Les Shadoks), (d. 2004).
- February 28: Gavin MacLeod, American actor (voice of Captain Gumble in the Pound Puppies episode "Bone Voyage", Daniel in The Greatest Adventure: Stories from the Bible episode "Daniel and the Lion's Den", himself in the Pinky and the Brain episode "The Pinky and the Brain Reunion Special"), (d. 2021).

=== March ===
- March 8: Gerald Potterton, British-Canadian animator (National Film Board of Canada, Yellow Submarine), storyboard artist (Rubik, the Amazing Cube), writer, producer (The Selfish Giant, The Happy Prince, The Christmas Messenger, George and the Christmas Star) and director (Cool McCool, Heavy Metal, CINAR, co-creator of The Smoggies), (d. 2022).
- March 11: Rupert Murdoch, Australian-born American businessman and founder of News Corporation (voiced himself in The Simpsons episodes "Sunday, Cruddy Sunday" and "Judge Me Tender").
- March 20:
  - Hal Linden, American actor (voice of Eli Selig in The Zeta Project episode "The Hologram Man", Old Lloyd Nebulon in the Lloyd in Space episode "Halloween Scary Fun Action Plan").
  - Rein Raamat, Estonian animation film director, artist and screenwriter (Joonisfilm).
- March 22: William Shatner, Canadian actor (voice of Captain Kirk in Star Trek: The Animated Series, Mayor Phlegmming in Osmosis Jones, Kazar in The Wild, Ozzie in Over the Hedge, Santa Claus in Gotta Catch Santa Claus, General Shanker in Escape from Planet Earth, Two-Face in Batman vs. Two-Face, Jason in the Hercules episode "Hercules and the Argonauts", Betty's Grandfather in the Atomic Betty episode "The No-L Nine", Grand Pear in the My Little Pony: Friendship is Magic episode "The Perfect Pear", Keldor in Masters of the Universe: Revolution, himself in the Futurama episode "Where No Fan Has Gone Before").
- March 26: Leonard Nimoy, American actor (voice of Spock in Star Trek: The Animated Series, Galvatron in The Transformers: The Movie, Mr. Moundshroud in The Halloween Tree, King Kashekim Nedakh in Atlantis: The Lost Empire, himself in The Simpsons and Futurama), (d. 2015).
- March 31: Ryō Ishihara, Japanese voice actor (voice of Cyborg 002 in Cyborg 009), (d. 2025).

=== April ===
- April 10: Gérald Forton, Belgian-born French comic book artist, animator (The Legend of White Fang, Skeleton Warriors), storyboard artist (Kid 'n Play, The Legend of Prince Valiant, Wild West C.O.W.-Boys of Moo Mesa, Red Planet, Rugrats, Skeleton Warriors, Darkstalkers, X-Men: The Animated Series, Road Rovers, Street Fighter, Extreme Ghostbusters, Men in Black: The Series, The Prince of Atlantis, Invasion America, RoboCop: Alpha Commando, The King and I), character designer (Filmation, DIC Entertainment, James Bond Jr.), background artist (The Pirates of Dark Water, Tiny Toon Adventures, Teenage Mutant Ninja Turtles, The Prince of Atlantis) and production designer (Filmation), (d. 2021).
- April 11: Koichi Sugiyama, Japanese composer (Cyborg 009, Space Runaway Ideon, Dragon Quest: The Adventure of Dai), (d. 2021).
- April 12: Gerry Matthews, American actor (voice of Sugar Bear in Linus the Lionhearted), (d. 2025).
- April 13: Jon Stone, American writer, producer, and director (Sesame Street), (d. 1997).
- April 18: Nina Gulyayeva, Russian actress (voice of Tsarevna in Beloved Beauty, Buratino in The Adventures of Buratino, Cipollino in Cipollino, the Little Mermaid in The Little Mermaid), (d. 2025).
- April 26: Bernie Brillstein, American film producer and talent agent (The Real Ghostbusters, ALF: The Animated Series, ALF Tales, Space Cats), (d. 2008).

=== May ===
- May 4: Donald C. Rogers, American sound engineer (The Secret of NIMH), (d. 2026).
- May 5: Greg, Belgian comics artist, writer and screenplay writer (Tintin and the Temple of the Sun, Tintin and the Lake of Sharks), (d. 1999).
- May 10: Ichiro Nagai, Japanese actor (d. 2014).
- May 6: Willie Mays, American baseball player (voiced himself in Willie Mays and the Say-Hey Kid), (d. 2024).
- May 12: Art Seidel, American production manager (assistant director for the live-action sequence in The Simpsons episode "Treehouse of Horror VI"), (d. 1998).
- May 18: Robert Morse, American actor and singer (voice of young Stuffy in The First Easter Rabbit, young Scrooge in The Stingiest Man in Town, the title character in Jack Frost, Moncho in Monchhichis, Howler in Pound Puppies, Marshak and Gnuckles in Sofia the First, Santa Claus in Teen Titans Go! and Teen Titans Go! vs. Teen Titans, Goopy Gear in the Tiny Toon Adventures episode "Two-Tone Town", Dootch in the Aaahh!!! Real Monsters episode "Where Have All The Monsters Gone?", Mr. Koch in the Rugrats episode "Faire Play", DeSaad in the Superman: The Animated Series episode "Father's Day", Jake in The Wild Thornberrys episode "Two's Company", Old Phil in the Animals. episode "Flies."), (d. 2022).
- May 23: Barbara Barrie, American actress (voice of Alcmene in the Hercules franchise), (d. 2026).

=== June ===
- June 7: Michael Bakewell, British television producer (Space Adventure Cobra: The Movie, Project A-ko, Patlabor: The Movie), (d. 2023).
- June 6: Ken Knowlton, American computer graphics pioneer, artist, mosaicist and portraitist (developed the BEFLIX programming language), (d. 2022).
- June 9: Yonehiko Kitagawa, Japanese voice actor (voice of Chairman Harabote Muscle in Kinnikuman, Cat Sailor B in Animal Treasure Island, Farmer in Hana no Ko Lunlun, President of Earth in Space Battleship Yamato III, Patrol Chief in Hashire Melos!, Hans in Future War 198X, Boss in Andromeda Stories, Dr. Dinessen in Galactic Gale Baxinger, al-Salem in Legend of the Galactic Heroes), (d. 2026).
- June 17: John Baldessari, American conceptual artist (voiced himself in The Simpsons episode "3 Scenes Plus a Tag from a Marriage"), (d. 2020).
- June 20: Olympia Dukakis, American actress (voice of Zelda in The Simpsons episode "The Old Man and the Key"), (d. 2021).
- June 21: Zlatko Grgić, Croatian animator and animation director (Professor Balthazar, The Devil's Work), (d. 1988).
- June 27: Luc Mazel, Belgian comic artist and animator (worked for Belvision), (d. 2024).
- June 29: Ed Gilbert, American actor (voice of Baloo in TaleSpin, Thrust and Blitzwing in The Transformers, Pugsy and Daddy Sterling in Tom and Jerry: The Movie, Mr. Smee in Peter Pan and the Pirates, Looten Plunder in Captain Planet and the Planeteers, Professor Heiny in Freakazoid!, Dormammu in Spider-Man, the Mandarin in season 1 of Iron Man), (d. 1999).

=== July ===
- July 2: Robert Ito, Canadian actor (voice of Henry Chan in The Amazing Chan and the Chan Clan, Mandarin in season 2 of Iron Man, Kyodai Ken in Batman: The Animated Series, Mr. Miyagi in The Karate Kid, Black Dragon/White Dragon in Rambo: The Force of Freedom, Sun Warrior Chief in the Avatar: The Last Airbender episode "The Firebending Master", Goose Lee in the Darkwing Duck episode "Kung Fooled").
- July 5: Bill Skiles, American comedian (voice of Monkeys in The Jungle Book), (d. 2011).
- July 6: Della Reese, American singer and actress (voice of Eema in Dinosaur, the Blue Fairy in the Happily Ever After: Fairy Tales for Every Child episode "Pinocchio"), (d. 2017).
- July 11: Yasuo Ōtsuka, Japanese animator (Panda and the Magic Serpent, Alakazam the Great, The Wonderful World of Puss 'n Boots, Lupin III), (d. 2021).
- July 16: Ed Seeman, American animator (Casper the Friendly Ghost, Popeye), (d. 2025).
- July 21: Plas Johnson, American composer (The Pink Panther), (d. 2026).
- July 28: Darryl Hickman, American former actor (voice of Kid Comet in Space Stars, Wags in The Biskitts, Pac-Junior in Pac-Man, Hornet in Challenge of the GoBots, Roadie in Pole Position, Derek in The Greatest Adventure: Stories from the Bible, Marbles in GoBots: Battle of the Rock Lords, R. J. Scott in Sky Commanders, Steve Trevor in The Super Powers Team: Galactic Guardians episode "The Darkseid Deception", additional voices in Wildfire, Scooby-Doo and Scrapy Doo, The New Adventures of Jonny Quest, A Pup Named Scooby-Doo), (d. 2024).

=== August ===
- August 7: Per Åhlin, Swedish artist and animated film director (Dunderklumpen!, The Journey to Melonia), (d. 2023).
- August 10: Giuliano Cenci, Italian film director (The Adventures of Pinocchio), (d. 2018).
- August 17: Robert D. Buchanan, American animator (Colonel Bleep).
- August 23: David Cherkassky, Soviet and Ukrainian animated film director (Treasure Island), and screenwriter (Kievnauchfilm), (d. 2018).
- August 25: Regis Philbin, American television presenter (voice of Typhon in Hercules, Mabel in Shrek the Third, himself in The Simpsons, Family Guy, and Lilo & Stitch: The Series), (d. 2020).
- August 26: Ram Mohan, Indian animator (You Said It, Fire Games), director (Ramayana: The Legend of Prince Rama, Meena) and animation producer (Ram Mohan Biographics), (d. 2019).
- August 30: Jōji Yanami, Japanese actor (voice of Totousai in Inuyasha, Boodle and Ganfall in One Piece, the Narrator in Dragon Ball), (d. 2021).
- August 31: Sergio Matteucci, Italian actor and radio presenter (dub voice of Saiyan B in Dragon Ball Z, narrator in Dastardly and Muttley in Their Flying Machines), (d. 2020).

=== September ===
- September 10: Philip Baker Hall, American actor (voice of Mr. Thompson and Mr. Saunders in Baby Blues, Hank Hippopopalous in BoJack Horseman, Norman Walker in The Life & Times of Tim episode "Novelist"), (d. 2022).
- September 12:
  - Ian Holm, English actor (voice of Chef Skinner in Ratatouille, Pontius Pilate in The Miracle Maker), (d. 2020).
  - Bill McKinney, American actor (voice of Jonah Hex in the Batman: The Animated Series episode "Showdown"), (d. 2011).
- September 17: Anne Bancroft, American actress (voice of Queen Ant in Antz, Empress Sedessa in Delgo, Dr. Zweig in The Simpsons episode "Fear of Flying"), (d. 2005).
- September 21: Larry Hagman, American actor, director and producer (voice of Wallace Brady in The Simpsons episode "The Monkey Suit"), (d. 2012).
- September 25: Peter Woodthorpe, English actor (voice of Gollum in The Lord of the Rings, Werewolf in The Talking Parcel, Casca in the Shakespeare: The Animated Tales episode "Julius Caesar"), (d. 2004).
- September 29: Eddie Barth, American actor (voice of Champ in Rover Dangerfield, Detective Kurt Bowman in Superman: The Animated Series, Frank the Pug in Men in Black: The Series, Louie and Referee in As Told by Ginger, Gorgonzola in the Biker Mice from Mars episode "A Scent, a Memory, a Far Distant Cheese"), (d. 2010).

=== October ===
- October 2: Enzo Facciolo, Italian comics artist and animator (worked for Toni Pagot), (d. 2021).
- October 24: Sofia Gubaidulina, Soviet and Russian composer (Adventures of Mowgli, The Cat Who Walked by Herself), (d. 2025).
- October 27: Vinnie Bell, American animator (Terrytoons, Schoolhouse Rock!, The Berenstain Bears specials, Harvey Birdman, Attorney at Law), (d. 2021).
- October 30: Dick Gautier, American actor, comedian, singer and caricaturist (voice of Rodimus Prime in The Transformers, Serpentor in G.I. Joe: A Real American Hero, Spike in Tom & Jerry Kids, Teddy Lupus in the Batman: The Animated Series episode "Feat of Clay"), (d. 2017).
- October 31: Dan Rather, American journalist (voiced himself in The Simpsons episodes "E Pluribus Wiggum" and "Trust but Clarify").

=== November ===
- November 1: Shunsuke Kikuchi, Japanese composer (Doraemon, Dragon Ball, Dr. Slump, Getter Robo, Tiger Mask), (d. 2021).
- November 19: Lester Pourier, American animator and layout artist (Hanna-Barbera, Garfield and Friends, Tom and Jerry: The Movie), (d. 2020).
- November 22: Esa Saario, Finnish actor (Finnish dub voice of Mufasa in The Lion King franchise), (d. 2025).
- November 28: Tomi Ungerer, French novelist, illustrator, cartoonist and poster designer (narrator in The Three Robbers and The Moon Man), (d. 2019).
- November 30: Jack Sheldon, American jazz trumpeter, singer (Schoolhouse Rock!, performed the song "Take the Money and Run" in Teacher's Pet) and actor (voice of The Sensitive Male, The President, Chef and Traffic Cop in Johnny Bravo, The Amendment in The Simpsons episode "The Day the Violence Died", 'Vagina Junction' Conductor and The Bill in the Family Guy episodes "Running Mates" and "Mr. Griffin Goes to Washington"), (d. 2019).

=== December ===
- December 9: Paddi Edwards, British actress (voice of Flotsam and Jetsam in The Little Mermaid, Twinkle the Bag Lady in Edith Ann: Homeless Go Home, Gloria in Phantom 2040, Lab Computer in The Brave Little Toaster to the Rescue, Satellite 1 in The Brave Little Toaster Goes to Mars, Atropos in Hercules, Lucy in 101 Dalmatians: The Series, Vera in Pepper Ann, Maggie Pie in the Batman: The Animated Series episode "Eternal Youth"), (d. 1999).
- December 11:
  - Rita Moreno, Puerto Rican-born American actress and singer (voice of Tanya Trunk in Bonkers, Ella Salvator in Captain Planet and the Planeteers, Carmen Sandiego in Where on Earth Is Carmen Sandiego?, Dr. Camrina Skeledon in The Magic School Bus, Dona Dolores in Scooby-Doo! and the Monster of Mexico, Abuela in Special Agent Oso, Mimi in Rio 2, Abuelita in Nina's World, Queen Camilla in Elena of Avalor, Cookie Booker in Carmen Sandiego, Gertrude St. John in Curious George: Cape Ahoy, Ah Puch in Maya and the Three, Dookness in Green Eggs and Ham).
  - Howard Storm, American director and actor (voice of Commercial Director in the Duckman episode "They Craved Duckman's Brain!"), (d. 2026).
- December 15: Ernest Pintoff, American animator and film director (The Violinist, The Critic), (d. 2002).
- December 23: Ronnie Schell, American actor (voice of Jason in Battle of the Planets, Gilly in Goober and the Ghost Chasers, Rick the Racoon in Shirt Tales, Pushover Smurf in The Smurfs episode "The Smurf Who Couldn't Say No", Freako in Scooby-Doo Meets the Boo Brothers, Colonel Calloway in Scooby-Doo and the Ghoul School, Master Fezzick in The Legend of Prince Valiant, Rudy 2 in Jetsons the Movie, Eddie in Rover Dangerfield, Mayor Fitzhugh in Recess), (d. 2026).
- December 24: Robert Ridgely, American actor (voice of the Purple Pie Man in Strawberry Shortcake, the title character in Thundarr the Barbarian, Mr. Kelp in Snorks, Rex Charger in Centurions, Al Vermin in Bonkers, and The Commander in Dexter's Laboratory), (d. 1997).

=== Specific date unknown ===
- Dan Mills, American animator (Beany and Cecil, Linus the Lionhearted, Hanna-Barbera, Filmation, Teenage Mutant Ninja Turtles, Freddie as F.R.O.7, Asterix Conquers America, The Pagemaster, Cats Don't Dance, Family Guy) and storyboard artist (Disney Television Animation), (d. 2011).
- David Saire, English actor (additional voices in Courage the Cowardly Dog), (d. 2021).
- Eugene Troubetzkoy, French-born American nuclear physicist, scientist and software supporter (Tron, co-founder of Blue Sky Studios), (d. 2022).
