= The Showman (1930 film) =

1930 film

- Directed by: Dick Huemer; Sid Marcus; Arthur Davis
- Written by: Dick Huemer; Sid Marcus; Arthur Davis
- Produced by: Charles Mintz
- Music by: Joe DeNat
- Animation by: Arthur Davis
- Production company: Charles Mintz Studio
- Distributed by: RKO Pictures
- Release date: November 22, 1930
- Running time: 5:24
- Country: United States
- Language: English

Cartoon with recreated sound

The Showman is a 1930 animated film directed by Dick Huemer, Sid Marcus and Arthur Davis, and is part of the Toby the Pup series.

== Plot ==
A vaudeville event is being held, and Toby is the main performer. The opening act shows him conducting an orchestra. He would also play a piano while suspending on a trapeze. Toby then resumes conducting the orchestra while simultaneously moving a long bow with his tail to play three violins.

Other acts in the event features three hornless cows doing ballet. Another one features a goldfish which steps out of the fish bowl to dance on the rim. Next, a trio of emus dance back and forth, side by side.

For the finale, Toby wears a tutu and performs a little ballet. After undressing, he plays a flute, and a puffer fish duets with him. As they mightily put effort to their music, the puffer fish inflates so much until it bursts. Though only the skeleton is left of it, the fish is still somewhat alive. The live audience enjoys the show and therefore applauds as the curtain goes down, but when the curtain falls off and Toby is still on stage, the audience hurls objects at him, prompting the dog and even the skeletal fish to run.
