= Goin' to Heaven on a Mule =

1934 film by Isadore Freleng

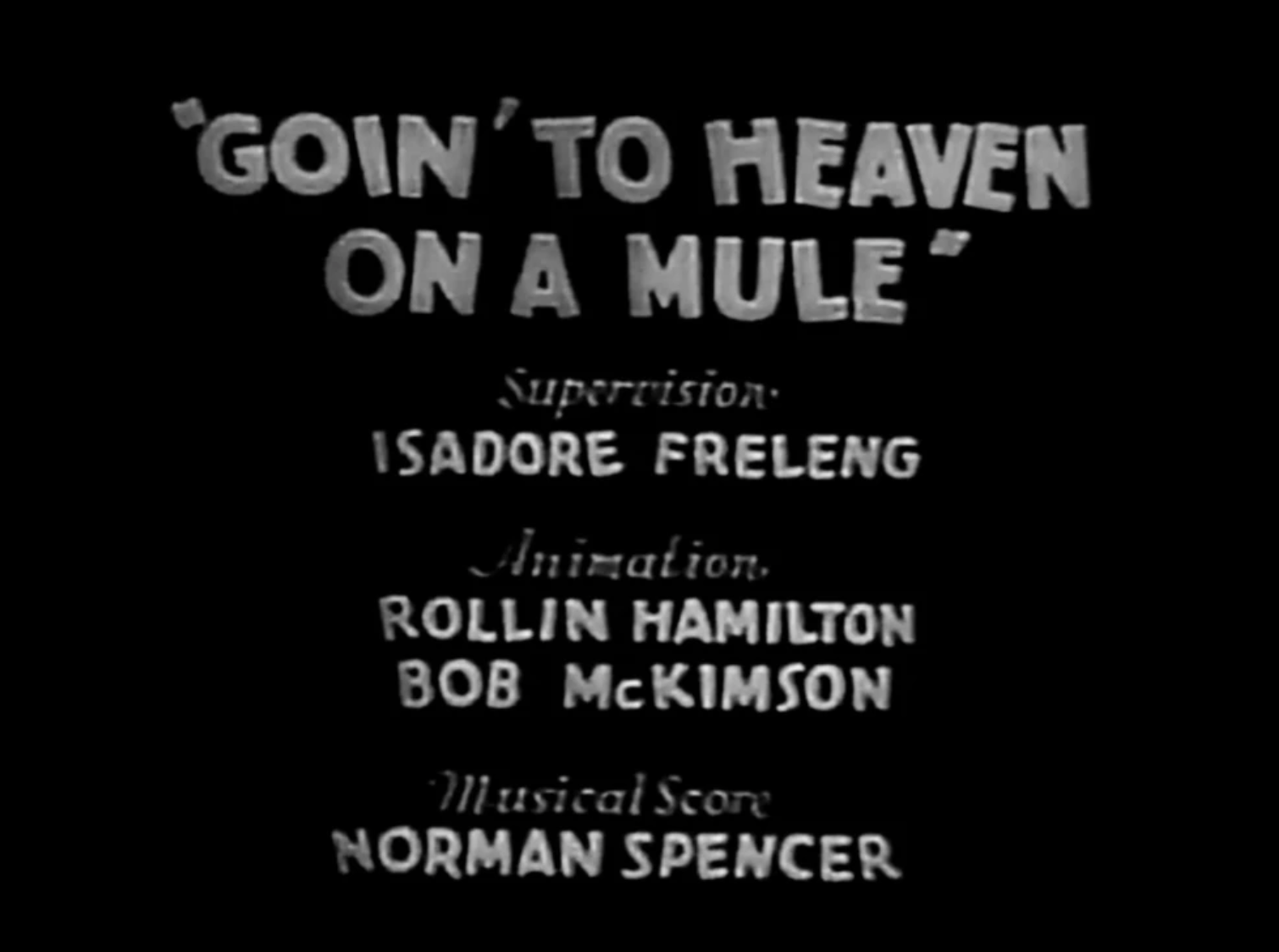
- Title card
- Directed by: Isadore Freleng
- Produced by: Leon Schlesinger
- Music by: Norman Spencer
- Animation by: Rollin Hamilton; Bob McKimson
- Color process: Black-and-white
- Production company: Leon Schlesinger Productions
- Distributed by: Warner Bros. Pictures; The Vitaphone Corporation
- Release date: May 19, 1934
- Running time: 7 min
- Country: United States
- Language: English

Goin' to Heaven on a Mule is a 1934 American animated comedy short film directed by Isadore Freleng. It was originally released on May 19, 1934. It is the 34th film in the Merrie Melodies series, featuring the titular song from the film Wonder Bar.

Alongside the song featured in Wonder Bar, the film is controversial for its racial stereotypes of black people as well as portraying God in blackface. It was withheld from circulation, but is not considered to be one of the "Censored Eleven" shorts, as Associated Artists Productions did not acquire the film's rights from Warner Bros. Pictures.

== Plot ==
A group of African-American cotton pickers work at a field using various tools. The cotton is then used to produce clothes claimed to be made of wool. Elsewhere, a lazy man is sleeping on the job, only to be waken by a group of flies he had been blowing away in his sleep. When he reaches for a bottle of gin, his conscience, personified by an angel and the Devil, fight over decision-making, but the slave drinks it anyway and breathes fire, unable to handle the alcohol.

The man drunkenly hallucinates a scenario he walks to Heaven while riding a mule and singing the titular song. He reaches the gate, aptly titled "Pair-O-Dice". God and a crowd of black angels welcome him, while a guard rolls two dice to decide if he gets to stay. God kicks out a Fuller Brush salesman before welcoming the man into a town in Heaven. The man goes into the "Milkyway Cafe" and eats a spare watermelon while he watches black people giving musical performances.

The man finds a gin garden, where he blatantly disregards the sign calling it a "forbidden fruit" and drinks a bottle. His act is discovered by God, who sends him to Hell for sinning while he is still drunk. The man wakes up and throws the bottle away, but immediately succumbs to temptation and catches the bottle for another sip, having not learnt his lesson.

== See also ==
- Censored Eleven
- Clean Pastures
- Sunday Go to Meetin' Time
