= Goldilocks and the Jivin' Bears =

- Title card for Blue Ribbon re-release
- Directed by: I. Freleng
- Story by: Tedd Pierce
- Starring: Harland Evans; Mel Blanc; Sara Berner; Lillian Randolph
- Narrated by: Ernie Whitman
- Music by: Carl W. Stalling
- Animation by: Ken Champin
- Color process: Technicolor
- Production company: Warner Bros. Cartoons, Inc.
- Distributed by: Warner Bros. Pictures; The Vitaphone Corporation
- Release date: September 2, 1944
- Running time: 7:22
- Language: English

Goldilocks and the Jivin' Bears is a 1944 Warner Bros. Merrie Melodies cartoon directed by Friz Freleng and produced by an uncredited Eddie Selzer. The short was released on September 2, 1944.

Because of the racial stereotypes of black people throughout the short, it is withheld from circulation, one of the so-called "Censored Eleven" shorts. It is the only Censored Eleven short not to be produced by Leon Schlesinger as he had sold his studio to Warner Bros. Pictures around the release of this cartoon.

== Plot ==
The Three Bears (unrelated to the Three Bears from Chuck Jones' cartoons), a jazz trio, are enjoying a hot jam session when their instruments catch fire. After consulting a storybook, they find that they must go out for a walk to let the instruments cool off.

Across the street (in a house with a neon sign saying "GRANMA'S"), the Big Bad Wolf is expecting Red Riding Hood's arrival. Instead, he receives a telegram that says Red Riding Hood will be late because she is "working at Lockheed as a riveter." The frustrated wolf looks out the window and sees Goldilocks entering the Three Bears' house. (Unlike the other characters, Goldilocks is drawn as an attractive young woman.) Because there is a "food shortage" going on, the wolf decides to pursue Goldilocks.

Inside the Three Bears' house, Goldilocks tries all the beds and lies down in the best one, only to find the wolf in bed with her. The wolf chases Goldilocks through the house until the Three Bears return. Finding Goldilocks and the wolf struggling in the living room, they shout "Jitterbugs!" and begin playing a dance tune. The wolf and Goldilocks dance the jitterbug until the wolf is exhausted and flees to Grandma's house.

Red Riding Hood returns to find the wolf in Grandma's bed, but the wolf is too tired to eat her. So he attempts to make Red leave, claiming she came too late for their segment and his feet are sore from the dance. However The Three Bears rush in, shout "Dere's dat jitterbug!" and resume playing. This causes Grandma to burst out of a cupboard and jitterbug with the wolf, who turns to the audience and says, in a Jimmy Durante voice, "Everybody wants to get into the act!"

== Reception ==
Motion Picture Herald (Oct 7, 1944): "When hot swing hits the old nursery tales it cuts some strange capers. Here, three bears go to town in modern musical style leaving the way clear for a blackfaced Goldilocks who proceeds to sample the beds. In comes the wolf, weary of waiting for Little Red Riding Hood and on the prowl for other game. The bears return and Goldi gives the Wolf quite a workout, while Red Riding Hood and Grandma arrive in time to keep him on his feet."

Motion Picture Exhibitor (Sept 6, 1944): "This hilarious burlesque on fairy tales has the three Jivin' Black Bears going to town with some red hot music... With rhyme, colored dialect, swell music accompaniment, this is tops. Excellent."

== Notes ==
- This cartoon was re-released into the Blue Ribbon Merrie Melodies program on December 1, 1951. The original closing title card was kept. It is the only cartoon in the Censored Eleven that does not survive with its original titles, as the original titles for Sunday Go to Meetin' Time and The Isle of Pingo Pongo are known to exist.

== See also ==
- Coal Black and de Sebben Dwarfs
- Three Little Bops, a similarly jazz-themed Looney Tunes retelling of "The Three Little Pigs".
