= Toby the Pup =

American animated cartoon character (1930–31)

- Toby the Pup character
- A Toby the Pup promotional poster
- First appearance: The Museum; August 19, 1930
- Last appearance: The Bull Thrower; June 7, 1931
- Created by: Sid Marcus; Dick Huemer; Arthur Davis
- Voiced by: Dick Huemer

In-universe information
- Species: Dog
- Gender: Male

Toby the Pup is an animated cartoon character created by animators Sid Marcus, Dick Huemer, and Arthur Davis. He starred in a series of early sound shorts produced by Charles Mintz's Screen Gems for RKO Pictures. The series lasted from 1930 to 1931. Twelve cartoons were produced, though some are still considered to be lost. The character was voiced by Dick Huemer. All of the character's cartoons fell into the public domain in the 1950s due to the copyrights not being renewed.

== History ==
In 1930, Charles Mintz, while simultaneously producing the Krazy Kat cartoon series for Columbia, decided to create an additional series to be distributed through RKO Radio Pictures. He hired two Fleischer animators, Dick Huemer and Sid Marcus, and assigned them to work with Art Davis to create the new series. Marcus, who worked for the Mintz studio when it was still located in New York City, devised Toby the Pup. Toby was similar to Fleischer's Bimbo in both personality and character design. He wore a custodian hat and a pair of shoes that looked like dog feet.

Despite the series' success, it concluded after only twelve films, most likely because of RKO's ties with the Van Beuren studio. By the time the series ended, however, Mintz was already negotiating with Columbia for backing on a second cartoon series to be headed again by Huemer, Marcus, and Davis. For this series, Huemer devised a new character, a small boy named Scrappy.

Today, only eight of the Toby cartoons are known to exist.

- A fragment of The Museum is held by the Library of Congress. Prints of the short have turned up in a few private film collections in the United States and four were discovered in Europe.
- UCLA currently owns a sound print of Circus Time.
- Cartoon Factory, a syndicated compilation of public domain cartoons distributed throughout Europe by Lobster Films, features three Toby cartoons: The Milkman, Down South, and Halloween.
- In 2005, a full 16mm print of The Brown Derby was found in a private collection in San Marcos, Texas, by Toby Heidel. The print is currently housed at UCLA and restoration is being attempted by Jere Guldin.
- A substantial fragment of The Showman has also surfaced.
- In 2016, Inkwell Images issued a Blu-Ray release of the five existent Toby cartoons, "The Museum", "The Milkman", "Down South", and "Halloween" through an arrangement with Lobster Films, and "Circus Time" through UCLA Film Archives.
- In 2024, a French print of "The Fiddler" was discovered by Thunderbean, who unofficially released it on one of their special Blu-rays, "Thunderbean Sneak Preview Blu-Ray 2024", which was only available for purchase for one week. It was leaked online later that year, but was taken down.

Toby can be seen dancing in one of the scenes of the film Cool World.

- In 2016, the company Inkwell Images attempted to Trademark "Toby the Pup" for exclusive use on home video. This effort, after several revisions, failed. This attempt was likely done to prevent other companies from releasing a Toby the Pup home video.

== Filmography ==
=== 1930 ===
No.	Title	Director	Original release date	Distributor	Film	Notes
1	The Museum	Authur Davis, Dick Huemer, & Sid Marcus	August 19, 1930	RKO Pictures		The first Toby the Pup cartoon.; Exists in several 35mm prints of undetermined completeness and a 17.5mm sound print.
2	The Fiddler	Authur Davis, Dick Huemer, & Sid Marcus	September 1, 1930	RKO Pictures	Not publicly available.	A French print exists.
3	The Miner	Authur Davis, Dick Huemer, & Sid Marcus	October 1, 1930	RKO Pictures	Lost film	
4	The Showman	Authur Davis, Dick Huemer, & Sid Marcus	November 22, 1930	RKO Pictures	With recreated sound	Exists in a complete sound print with French titles.; A silent print with no opening or ending titles was found in 2010.; A sound fragment of the film was found by Cartoon98100 and was donated to Thunderbean Animations.
5	The Bug House	Authur Davis, Dick Huemer, & Sid Marcus	December 7, 1930	RKO Pictures	Lost film	

=== 1931 ===
No.	Title	Director	Original release date	Distributor	Film	Notes
6	Circus Time	Authur Davis, Dick Huemer, & Sid Marcus	January 25, 1931	RKO Pictures		A sound unedited print is held by UCLA in 35mm.
7	The Milkman	Authur Davis, Dick Huemer, & Sid Marcus	February 25, 1931	RKO Pictures		A French 35mm release print survives, held by Lobster Films.
8	The Brown Derby	Authur Davis, Dick Huemer, & Sid Marcus	March 22, 1931	RKO Pictures	Not publicly available.	A full 16mm print was found in 2005 in San Marcos, Texas but as of now it is unavailable to the public.
9	Down South	Authur Davis, Dick Huemer, & Sid Marcus	April 15, 1931	RKO Pictures		A French 16mm release print survives, held by Lobster Films.
10	Hallowe'en	Authur Davis, Dick Huemer, & Sid Marcus	May 1, 1931	RKO Pictures		A French 35mm release print survives, held by Lobster Films.
11	Aces Up	Authur Davis, Dick Huemer, & Sid Marcus	May 16, 1931	RKO Pictures	Lost film	
12	The Bull Thrower	Authur Davis, Dick Huemer, & Sid Marcus	June 7, 1931	RKO Pictures	Lost film	The last Toby the Pup cartoon.

== See also ==
- Golden age of American animation
