= Down South (film) =

1931 film

- Directed by: Dick Huemer; Sid Marcus; Arthur Davis
- Written by: Dick Huemer; Sid Marcus; Arthur Davis
- Produced by: Charles Mintz
- Music by: Joe DeNat
- Animation by: Arthur Davis
- Production company: Winkler Productions
- Distributed by: RKO Pictures
- Release date: April 15, 1931
- Running time: 5:46
- Country: United States
- Language: English

Cartoon

Down South is an animated short film directed by Dick Huemer, Sid Marcus, and Arthur Davis and was distributed by RKO Pictures. The cartoon is the ninth of the twelve Toby the Pup films. The title comes from a 1901 song which is featured in the cartoon.

== Plot ==
Toby is the pilot of a paddle steamer. One day he docks his boat at a harbor to pick up passengers. As he has to shake hands with just about everyone who comes aboard, Toby struggles to keep a smile on his face.

When the boat finally leaves the harbor, the passengers are treated to some entertainment as Tessie sings the song "Mississippi Mud" at the center of the main deck. Everybody else sings along too, and stomps as well, but as they stomp harder and harder, the boat starts to shake, until he dances along. The shake is so strong that almost everybody, including Toby, gets thrown overboard.

The boat is not completely vacant as Tessie is still on board. Not liking to be far away from her beloved Toby and by the movements of the boat, she yells for help. Toby, trailing behind, swims to reach her. The boat then approaches a waterfall but Toby is able to reach it and gets back on board in time. He then moves the paddle wheels from the sides to the front. As the boat reaches the edge of the waterfall, the paddle wheels at the front work like airplane propellers, enabling it to fly. Relieved of her troubles, Tessie kisses Toby.
