= Hallowe'en (1931 film) =

1931 film

- Directed by: Dick Huemer; Sid Marcus; Arthur Davis
- Written by: Dick Huemer; Sid Marcus; Arthur Davis
- Produced by: Charles Mintz
- Music by: Joe DeNat
- Animation by: Arthur Davis
- Production company: Charles Mintz Studio
- Distributed by: RKO Pictures
- Release date: May 1, 1931
- Running time: 6:38
- Country: United States
- Language: English

Cartoon

Hallowe'en is a short animated film directed by Dick Huemer, Sid Marcus, and Arthur Davis, and distributed by RKO Pictures. The film is the third-to-last cartoon in the Toby the Pup series.

== Plot ==
At a Halloween costume party, Toby the Pup dances around. He kisses several girls but each reacts with dismay and runs away. Tessie confronts Toby, who kisses her a few times and she slaps him. She then complains to Toby about trying to spoil her party, and threatens to tell his mother about it. To placate her, Toby offers to play the piano. He plays while the other guests listen, including a goat who eats various household objects, including the piano keys. A church bell chimes and Toby warns everyone that this is the witching hour. Meanwhile, a witch and various supernatural creatures (including elves) are flying above. They fall through the chimney and frighten the party guests. Toby fights with several ghosts. When a number of ghosts surround him, he emulates a rooster's crow which frightens the ghosts and they flee. Toby and Tessie notice an egg on the floor which hatches into a small ghost who calls Toby "daddy".

== See also ==
- List of films set around Halloween
