= Devil May Hare =

1954 film by Robert McKimson

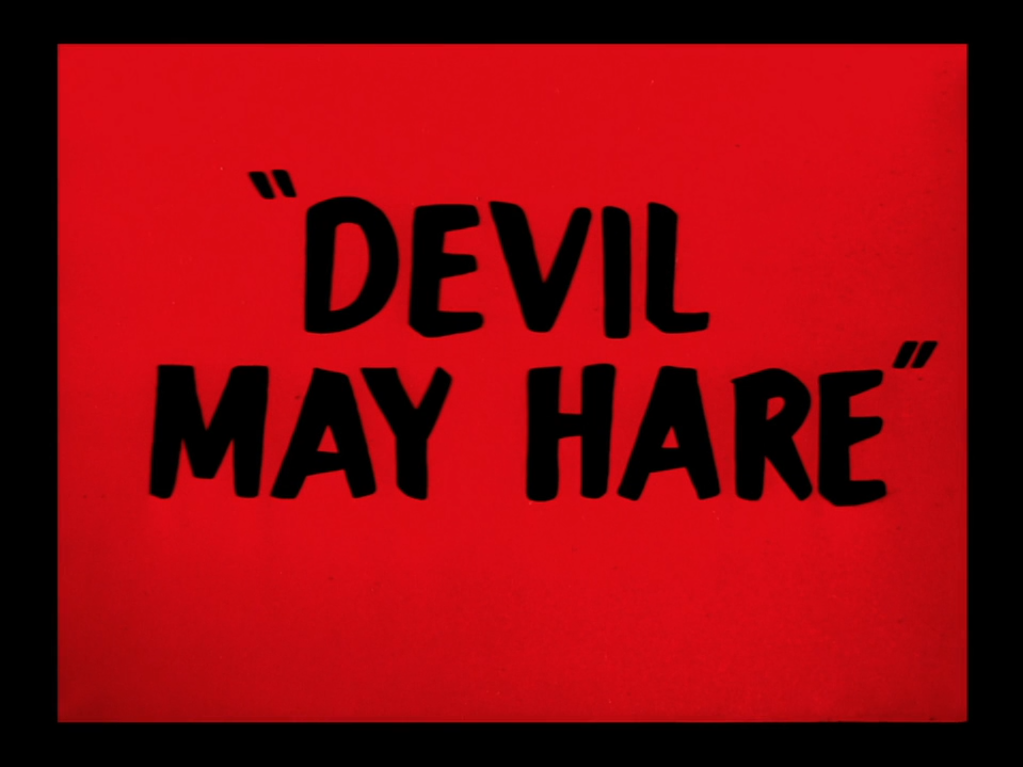
- Title card
- Directed by: Robert McKimson
- Story by: Sid Marcus
- Starring: Mel Blanc
- Music by: Milt Franklyn
- Animation by: Herman Cohen; Phil DeLara; Charles McKimson; Rod Scribner
- Layouts by: Bob Givens
- Backgrounds by: Richard H. Thomas
- Color process: Technicolor
- Production company: Warner Bros. Cartoons
- Distributed by: Warner Bros. Pictures; The Vitaphone Corporation
- Release date: June 19, 1954 (USA)
- Running time: 7 minutes
- Language: English

Devil May Hare is a 1954 Warner Bros. Looney Tunes cartoon directed by Robert McKimson. The short was released on June 19, 1954, and stars Bugs Bunny and the Tasmanian Devil making his debut. The title is a pun on the phrase "devil-may-care", meaning cheerful and reckless.

== Plot ==
Bugs is spring cleaning until he is interrupted by a huge variety of animals stampeding in fear. He fails to stop one of them from asking what is going on until he places a shovel in the way of a turtle, who explains that "the Tasmanian Devil's on the loose! Run for your lives!" Not knowing what a Tasmanian Devil is, Bugs walks down the stairs into his hole and looks in an encyclopedia. It describes the Tasmanian Devil, or Taz, as a "strong, murderous beast", with "jaws as powerful as a steel trap" and a "ravenous appetite", who eats a long list of animals. Taz, unknown to Bugs, has spun into the area and is actually standing next to the rabbit as he is reading; the marsupial interjects by writing "and rabbits" at the end of that list. This grabs Bugs' attention and Taz grabs him, intending a meal. Plotting to escape, Bugs offers Taz groundhogs as an appetizer.

Bugs directs Taz where to start digging for groundhogs, and as he is shoveling a hole, Bugs buries him in it. Realizing this is a trap, Taz springs out and attacks him, but Bugs feigns smelling chicken. He prepares a false chicken from liquid bubble gum and bicarbonate of soda. Called to "luncheon", Taz immediately devours this creation and starts hiccuping. He generates a giant bubble which Bugs blows into the air. Taz begins to drift away until Bugs uses a slingshot to pop the bubble and bring him down.

Bugs simplistically makes an inflatable raft look like a pig and lures Taz with pig noises. Taz swallows it whole, Bugs pulls the string, and the marsupial inflates into the shape of the raft. As Bugs admires a deer he has crudely fashioned from a variety of objects, Taz swirls in and chases him up a tree. While Taz methodically chomps sections of the tree, bringing Bugs closer to the ground each time, the rabbit diverts his attention to the deer. Bugs suggests Taz use the slingshot he has provided - a huge rubber band slung around a tree - to knock the prey out first. Taz does this, but as he is pulling the slingshot back in preparation to fling the pre-loaded rock, Bugs saws down the anchoring tree. Taz soars backwards and crashes.

As Bugs laughs and enjoys Taz's misfortune, a real fawn appears next to him. Bugs, unaware that the marsupial is standing behind him, warns the fawn, using several insulting adjectives to describe Taz. Noticing Taz behind him, he tells the marsupial that the fawn is made out of straw, although Taz acknowledges that Bugs is not and gives chase. At a point where Bugs eludes him for a second, he stops at a tree and, from a hole in it, retrieves a phone. He calls the Tasmanian Post-Dispatch and places a singles advertisement to find a romantic partner for Taz.

In a few seconds, an airplane flies in, lands and a Tasmanian She-Devil spins out, dressed for a wedding ceremony. Upon seeing her, Taz falls immediately in love. Bugs poses as a minister and pronounces them "Devil and Devilish". After Bugs tosses rice at them, they board the airplane, which flies away. Bugs bids them farewell and then tells the audience, "All the world loves a lover. But in this case we'll make an exception."

== Edited versions ==
When this cartoon aired on CBS in the 1980s, the part where Bugs uses a slingshot to bring Taz down (after he hiccups a bubblegum bubble that sends him skyward) was cut, making it seem that the bubble burst on its own.

== Home media ==
Devil May Hare has been featured uncut and uncensored on Looney Tunes Golden Collection: Volume 1 DVD box set. It also appeared in the Looney Tunes Platinum Collection: Volume 1 Blu-ray box set alongside Bedevilled Rabbit, Ducking the Devil, Bill of Hare and Dr. Devil and Mr. Hare.

| Preceded by No Parking Hare | Bugs Bunny Cartoons; 1954 | Succeeded by Bewitched Bunny |
