= The Shanty Where Santy Claus Lives =

1932 film by Rudolf Ising

- Directed by: Rudolf Ising
- Produced by: Hugh Harman; Rudolf Ising; Leon Schlesinger
- Music by: Frank Marsales
- Animation by: Rollin Hamilton; Norm Blackburn
- Color process: Black-and-white
- Production companies: Harman-Ising Productions; Leon Schlesinger Productions
- Distributed by: Warner Bros. Pictures; The Vitaphone Corporation
- Release date: December 21, 1932
- Running time: 7 min
- Country: United States
- Language: English

The Shanty Where Santy Claus Lives is a 1932 American animated comedy short film directed by Rudolf Ising. It is the nineteenth film in the Merrie Melodies series. The short was released early alongside the film Vanity Street on December 21, 1932, at the Warner Bros. Theater in Hollywood; the short would be released in theaters in the United States on December 24, 1932. It is the final Harman-Ising era cartoon distributed by Warner Bros. Pictures to not have its copyright renewed, and is hence in the public domain.

It makes use of a Great Depression setting of Christmas where Santa Claus is seeking shelter. The short takes place at a shantytown; hence the name "The Shanty Where Santy Claus Lives".

== Plot ==
Full short

On Christmas Eve, a sad and lonely boy walks past a church and listens to the people inside sing "Silent Night". He walks past a house, and watches the people celebrate Christmas with their family. Suddenly, a gust of wind blows, knocks him against the wall of a nearby tool shed, and covers him in snow. When he returns home, the boy opens his stocking, and discovers nothing inside. As he lies in a chair there crying, he hears the sound of sleigh bells ringing. He goes by the window, and notices Santa Claus's presence. Santa rewards him by bringing him to his shanty, as he had stayed good without doing misdeeds in the hopes of Christmas presents.

The boy plays with various toys, most of which had previously appeared in Red-Headed Baby, and sings the titular song. Eventually, a Christmas tree catches fire, and everybody does what they can to put it out. The boy manages to put out the fire by connecting a hose to bagpipes, squirting the tree, and putting out the fire. Everybody cheers as the cartoon ends.

== See also ==
- List of Christmas films
- Santa Claus in film
