= Clean Pastures =

1937 film by Isadore Freleng

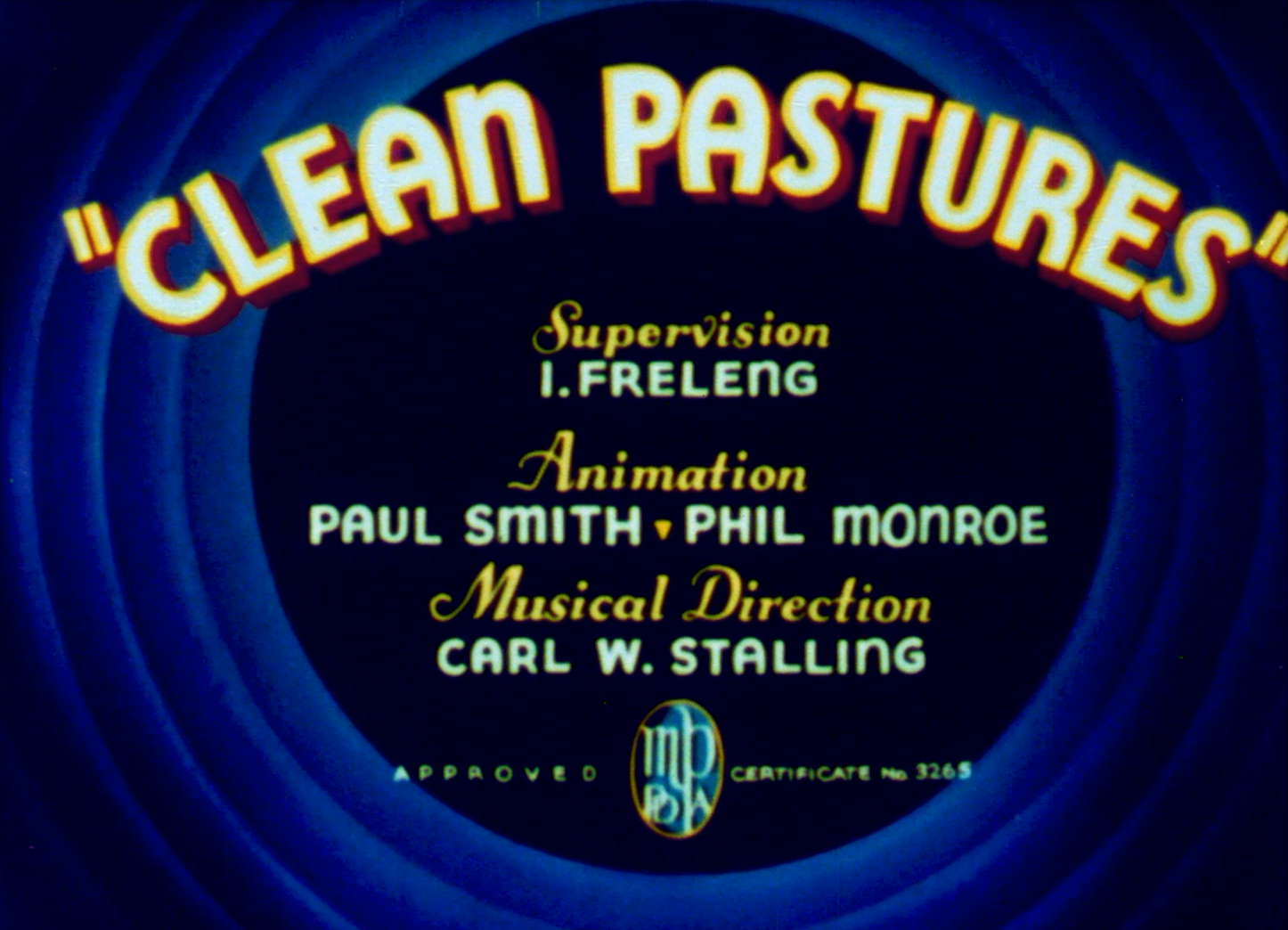
- Title card
- Directed by: Isadore Freleng
- Produced by: Leon Schlesinger
- Starring: Ben Carter; Lillian Randolph; William Days; Leroy Hunt; Paul Taylor's Sportsmen; Basin Street Boys; Mel Blanc
- Music by: Carl W. Stalling
- Animation by: Paul Smith; Phil Monroe
- Color process: Technicolor
- Production company: Leon Schlesinger Productions
- Distributed by: Warner Bros. Productions; The Vitaphone Corporation
- Release date: May 22, 1937
- Running time: 7 min
- Country: United States
- Language: English

Clean Pastures is a 1937 American animated comedy short film directed by Isadore Freleng. The short was released on May 22, 1937. It is the 74th film in the Merrie Melodies series. The cartoon gets the title from the 1936 film The Green Pastures. Because of the racial stereotypes of black people throughout the short, it is withheld from circulation, one of the "Censored Eleven" shorts.

== Plot ==
In Harlem, New York City, stereotypical African-Americans frolic in a nightclub. In Heaven, known as "Pair-O-Dice", a black God realizes their share value plummets while Hell's increases. He sends an angel caricature of Stepin Fetchit to Harlem to advertise Pair-O-Dice to no avail. Various jazz singer angels, caricatures of Louis Armstrong, Cab Calloway, Fats Waller, The Mills Brothers, and Jimmie Lunceford, request to descend to Harlem, as they believe swing music can motivate the nightclub patrons to be converted. A successful performance guides the people to Heaven where they are converted, including the Devil himself.

== Critical reception ==
Black critics in the 1930s wrote about the play and film The Green Pastures, but they were silent on its animated parody. Weisenfeld speculates that this is because animated cartoons were not seen as significant at the time. Modern critics of Clean Pastures fault the film for its stereotypical depictions of black culture. Cultural studies scholar William Anthony Nericcio sees the film as representative of a pattern in the works of Friz Freleng, who also produced such stereotype-ridden films as Jungle Jitters, Goldilocks and the Jivin' Bears, and the Speedy Gonzales cartoons. Lindvall and Fraser are more forgiving and call the cartoon "playful", "light", and "mischievous".

Daniel Goldmark alleges that the film is a burlesque of black religion and culture in its portrayal of Pair-O-Dice as "heavenly Harlem shops and singing choirs". In his interpretation, the film's use of rhythm is a metaphor for faith. This demonstrates white Americans' placement of jazz alongside religion and "the unfettered expressions of emotion associated with it" as aspects of African American culture. The cartoon implies that jazz cannot be replaced in the black psyche, as the musicians in the film must appropriate jazz, not compete with it, to draw Harlemites to Pair-O-Dice. The mortal characters are given no information about why Pair-O-Dice is better than Harlem, but the upbeat music is enough to lure them there. Even the Devil himself takes the bait. In the end, the film reaffirms the vision of Paradise from The Green Pastures, with its "perpetual Negro holiday [and] everlasting weekend fish fry."

On the other hand, Judith Weisenfeld sees Clean Pastures as an explicit rejection of Connelly's fish fry. Instead, she argues that the short is a metaphor for the replacement of one generation of African American performers and stereotypes for a new one as the result of African Americans moving to urban areas. In contrast to The Green Pastures and its portrayal of rural black culture, the cartoon is set in a solidly urban framework. Clean Pastures replaces stereotypes of black watermelon eaters and chicken stealers with black dancers, drinkers, and gamblers. Old-style black stereotypes are represented by the Stepin Fetchit angel and his recruitment sign, which promises delights that only appeal to rural black stereotypes. Yet even Bill "Bojangles" Robinson and Al Jolson, who built their careers on blackface depictions of rural blacks, reject Fetchit's plea for souls and opt for the Kotton Klub nightclub. The angelic jazz performers represent new, urban black culture. Through their rendition of "Swing for Sale", the souls of the Harlemites are saved, and the cartoon makes the point that the African American culture of the period was increasingly urban culture, and by extension, that the black Heaven is an urban, Northern place. Lindvall and Fraser take a similar view, seeing the cartoon as part of the Warner directors' transition from stereotyping blacks as "rural bumpkins" to featuring them as "urban hepcat[s]".

Jazz-performing angels use rhythm to lead the souls of Harlemites to heaven. Freleng's choice to caricature Cab Calloway, Fats Waller, and Louis Armstrong shows the crossover appeal of those performers among white audiences in the 1930s.

Goldmark and Weisenfeld agree that the film's portrayal of black culture is a negative one. Goldmark criticizes the film's implication that certain kinds of black music or black performers are better than others. He interprets the short's jazzy finale, which juxtaposes contemporary popular jazz with a traditional African American spiritual, as representative of this theme:

Furthermore, placing the creators of "good" hot jazz in heaven suggests that certain types of black music are better than others: "hot" music made in such places as Harlem would lead to debauchery and eventually to Hades, Inc. Only through the noble efforts of famous black musicians could souls be turned to a better direction.

Contemporary black commentators argued that to white audiences, Connelly's The Green Pastures simply reinforced the notion that black people presented a danger that needed to be contained. Weisenfeld argues that this is also the case with Freleng's parody. To white viewers in the 1930s, the film's implication that blacks care for nothing but gambling, drinking, and dancing only reinforces notions of the dangers posed by urban blacks. According to Goldmark, the choice of performers caricatured is telling; that Armstrong and Calloway are depicted as angels indicates that their crossover appeal was strong enough among whites that white audiences would not have felt threatened by the notion that they were angels in Heaven. Weisenfeld notes that by focusing the narrative on Saint Peter and his Stepin Fetchit underling, the animators ducked the potential offense white audiences might have felt upon seeing a black God.

== See also ==
- Hazbin Hotel, a 21st-century animated musical series with a similar premise about redeeming sinners into Heaven
- Scrub Me Mama with a Boogie Beat, a 1941 cartoon with a similar emphasis on jazz music
