= The Isle of Pingo Pongo =

1938 film by Fred Avery

- Original title card
- Directed by: Fred Avery
- Story by: George Manuell
- Produced by: Leon Schlesinger
- Starring: Mel Blanc
- Music by: Carl W. Stalling
- Animation by: Irven Spence
- Color process: Technicolor
- Production company: Leon Schlesinger Productions
- Distributed by: Warner Bros. Productions; The Vitaphone Corporation
- Release date: May 28, 1938
- Running time: 8 min
- Country: United States
- Language: English

The Isle of Pingo Pongo is a 1938 American animated comedy short film directed by Fred Avery. The short was released on May 28, 1938. It is the 95th film in the Merrie Melodies series and the second cartoon to star Elmer Fudd. It is the first of a series of travelogue spoofs directed by Avery, where each vignette is punctuated by a moment of blackout. It was re-released as a "Blue Ribbon" reissue in 1944, rendering the original film lost; Avery kept a nitrate fragment of the original titles, which was sold by his family in 2004 to a private collector, but still available publicly at extremely low definition.

Because of the racial stereotypes used against black people throughout the short, United Artists chose to withhold it from syndication within the United States in 1968. As such, the short was placed into the so-called Censored Eleven, a group of eleven Merrie Melodies and Looney Tunes shorts withheld from television distribution in the United States since 1968 due to heavy stereotyping of black people.

== Plot ==
A cruise ship travels from New York to the Isle of Pingo Pongo, presumably located in the South Seas. The ship sails past the Statue of Liberty, who acts as a traffic cop. The ship makes unnecessary twists and turns through the Canary Islands, depicted as literally an island full of caged canaries, the Sandwich Islands, depicted as a giant hot dog, as well as the Thousand Islands, depicted as a jar of Thousand Island dressing. The ship arrives at the island, where a woman drops coins into the ocean for the locals, only for fellow passengers to dive out of greed.

The narrator introduces the island's fauna, including a hummingbird that literally hums a melody, a mockingbird who breaks the fourth wall and mocks the narrator until it is compared to a cuckoo, as well as a baby canary who vaguely resembles Tweety and calls out for its mother. The narrator then introduces an elephant and a gazelle, the latter doing a striptease routine after the narrator orders it to slow down. The narrator is shocked to see an Inuit man feeding a polar bear vacationing on the island.

A native hunts two deer, only to be beat up and trapped instead. At a nearby village, natives sing "She'll Be Coming 'Round the Mountain". One native eats a banana and notices the narrator when he describes the native's apparent ignorance, taking a photo of him. One native cooks a meal which is carried by another native with a lip plate. A native drinks coconut milk. Unrelated live action scenes of a horse race suddenly appear to interrupt the short, which the narrator apologizes for. Natives partake in a sport that resembles American football. Natives waltz to a classical melody ironically described as primitive. Four natives led by a caricature of Fats Waller sing a cappella on radio. The narrator's racism becomes more apparent as more natives form a jazz orchestra and perform while other natives dance.

A running gag involves Elmer Fudd following the narrator and emerging in unexpected places, requesting to do something that the narrator denies until the ending, when Elmer is allowed to take out his shotgun to shoot the sun, which sinks to the West to his amusement.

== See also ==
- Jungle Jitters
- Hello Aloha
- Elmer Fudd filmography
- Looney Tunes and Merrie Melodies filmography (1930–1939)
