= Censored Eleven =

Group of animated short films

Hittin' the Trail for Hallelujah Land (1931)

Jungle Jitters (1938)

The Censored Eleven is a group of Looney Tunes and Merrie Melodies cartoons originally produced by Leon Schlesinger Productions and released by Warner Bros. Pictures between 1931 and 1944. All of them have been withheld from syndication in the United States by United Artists (UA) since 1968. UA owned the distribution rights to the Associated Artists Productions library at that time, and decided to pull these 11 cartoons from broadcast because the use of ethnic stereotypes in the cartoons, specifically African and African-American stereotypes, was deemed too offensive for contemporary audiences.

The ban has been continued by UA and the successive owners of the pre-August 1948 Looney Tunes/Merrie Melodies. Since 1968, these shorts have not been officially broadcast on television and have only been exhibited theatrically by Warner Bros. once (in 2010, see below for more details) since their withdrawal. They have turned up, however, on low-cost VHS and DVD collections.

== Background ==
Warner Bros.' cartoon output during its most active period contained a larger amount of offensive humor due to producer Leon Schlesinger's hands-off approach, which persisted until his retirement and succession by Edward Selzer. Unlike feature films, which were routinely censored in the script, the animated shorts were passed upon only when completed, which made immediate censorship often undesirable at times. In 1983, director Chuck Jones commented on the television censorship of the Warner Bros. cartoons: "I don't like to see the films cut at all. [...] They make some cuts that are so arbitrary and stupid, you can't believe it." Independent stations that once ran the syndicated Warner Bros. cartoons never had the same type of censorship as first-run networks such as ABC and CBS did for the cartoons. Some stations owned syndication rights to "a few they consider[ed] racially stereotypical", but never ran them.

When Ted Turner obtained the rights to the pre-1950 Warner Bros. library from MGM/UA Entertainment Co. in 1986, he vowed that he would not distribute or air any cartoons from the Censored Eleven. They were the only cartoons in this package not to be featured in the LaserDisc series The Golden Age of Looney Tunes. Warner Bros. Entertainment currently owns the films through Turner Entertainment Co., except those in the public domain. Goin' to Heaven on a Mule was withdrawn in a similar manner, but is not considered a part of the Censored Eleven as Warner Bros. never sold its rights.

== Censored Eleven list ==
Censored Eleven cartoons
Title	Year	Director	Series	Public domain
Hittin' the Trail for Hallelujah Land	1931	Rudolf Ising	Merrie Melodies	Yes
Sunday Go to Meetin' Time	1936; 1944 (reissue)	Friz Freleng	Merrie Melodies	No
Clean Pastures	1937	Friz Freleng	Merrie Melodies	No
Uncle Tom's Bungalow	1937	Tex Avery	Merrie Melodies	No
Jungle Jitters	1938	Friz Freleng	Merrie Melodies	Yes
The Isle of Pingo Pongo	1938; 1944 (reissue)	Tex Avery	Merrie Melodies	No
All This and Rabbit Stew	1941	Tex Avery	Merrie Melodies	Yes
Coal Black and de Sebben Dwarfs	1943	Bob Clampett	Merrie Melodies	No
Tin Pan Alley Cats	1943	Bob Clampett	Merrie Melodies	No
Angel Puss	1944	Chuck Jones	Looney Tunes	No
Goldilocks and the Jivin' Bears	1944; 1951 (reissue)	Friz Freleng	Merrie Melodies	No

Friz Freleng directed the largest number of cartoons on the list with four, followed by Tex Avery with three, and Bob Clampett with two. Rudolf Ising and Chuck Jones each have only one cartoon on the list. Angel Puss is the only cartoon directed by Jones on the list, as well as the only Looney Tunes cartoon on the list. Hittin' the Trail to Hallelujah Land is the only black-and-white short on the list, the only cartoon directed by Ising, and the only cartoon to star Piggy. Goldilocks and the Jivin' Bears is the only cartoon on this list not to be produced by Leon Schlesinger. All This and Rabbit Stew is the only Bugs Bunny cartoon on the list. The Isle of Pingo Pongo is also the only Elmer Fudd cartoon on the list. The other eight are one-shot cartoons.

== Public awareness in the 21st century ==
As the 20th century came to a close, the Censored Eleven cartoons became better known.

In February 2010, as part of a press release for the first annual TCM Classic Film Festival, it was announced that the Censored Eleven were to receive a special screening sourced from restored 35mm film prints. This special presentation was put together by George Feltenstein, vice president of Warner Bros.' classic film catalog. Film historian Donald Bogle, who has six books written and published on the subject of African American stereotypes in film, agreed to host the event for the festival. On April 24, 2010, a total of eight of the Censored Eleven were screened at the Egyptian Theater in Hollywood; the three that were not shown at the event were Jungle Jitters, All This and Rabbit Stew, and Angel Puss.

=== Home media release ===
At the New York Comic Con in October 2010, Warner Bros. confirmed that it would be releasing the Censored Eleven completely uncut on DVD through the Warner Archive Collection sometime in 2011. As of 2026, no further information has been given about this release.

== See also ==
- Song of the South
- Scrub Me Mama with a Boogie Beat
- Little Black Sambo
- His Mouse Friday
- Broadcast Standards and Practices
- Dumbo's depiction of African Americans
- Goin' to Heaven on a Mule
