= Homeless Hare =

1950 film by Chuck Jones

- Title card
- Directed by: Charles M. Jones
- Story by: Michael Maltese
- Starring: Mel Blanc; John T. Smith (uncredited)
- Music by: Carl Stalling
- Animation by: Ken Harris; Phil Monroe; Ben Washam; Lloyd Vaughan
- Layouts by: Robert Gribbroek
- Backgrounds by: Peter Alvarado
- Color process: Technicolor
- Production company: Warner Bros. Cartoons
- Distributed by: Warner Bros. Pictures
- Release date: March 11, 1950
- Running time: 7:04
- Country: United States
- Language: English

Homeless Hare is a 1950 Warner Bros. Merrie Melodies cartoon short directed by Chuck Jones. The short was released on March 11, 1950, and stars Bugs Bunny. ABC broadcasts omit the shot of Bugs dropping a brick on Hercules' head. The Blue Ribbon release also removed the shorts original Bugs Bunny in card, joining only Hot Cross Bunny, Knights Must Fall & Rabbit Hood in this distinction.

== Plot ==
Bugs Bunny awakens to discover his rabbit hole disturbed by a robust construction worker named Hercules at a high-rise construction site. Despite Bugs' polite request for restoration, Hercules feigns compliance before unceremoniously depositing Bugs and the displaced earth into a dump truck. Bugs' protestations against this infringement, laced with incredulity at the lack of regard for the sanctity of home, fall on deaf ears as he is engulfed by another cascade of soil and transported away.

Bugs then retaliates against Hercules by deploying various construction materials to disrupt his activities. From dropping bricks and steel girders onto Hercules from the building's height to tampering with the elevator controls, Bugs engineers a series of mishaps that culminate in Hercules' immersion in wet concrete.

Subsequently assuming the guise of the project engineer, Bugs coerces Hercules into erecting a lofty brick wall, followed by additional attachments that ensnare him atop a teeterboard at precarious heights. Despite Hercules' efforts to counter Bugs' interference, his eventual loss of clothing and dignity underscores Bugs' strategic advantage. In a decisive move to reclaim his territory, Bugs orchestrates a final confrontation with Hercules. Utilizing a red-hot rivet as his instrument of retribution, Bugs navigates through a maze of obstacles to precipitate a cascade of events culminating in Hercules' defeat and surrender.

The completed skyscraper ultimately incorporates Bugs' rabbit hole within its structure as a testament to his victory. Amidst this architectural triumph, Bugs reaffirms the principle that a man's home, no matter how modest, is indeed his castle.

== Home media ==
The short is available on disc 1 of Looney Tunes Golden Collection: Volume 3.

== See also ==
- List of Bugs Bunny cartoons
- No Parking Hare - a remake of this cartoon in 1954

Preceded by Mutiny On The Bunny	Bugs Bunny Cartoons; 1950	Succeeded by Big House Bunny
