= Bye, Bye Bluebeard =

- Directed by: Arthur Davis
- Story by: Sid Marcus
- Starring: Mel Blanc
- Music by: Carl Stalling
- Animation by: Basil Davidovich; J.C. Melendez; Don Williams; Emery Hawkins
- Layouts by: Don Smith
- Backgrounds by: Philip DeGuard
- Production company: Warner Bros. Cartoons
- Distributed by: Warner Bros. Pictures; The Vitaphone Corporation
- Release date: October 21, 1949 (U.S.)
- Running time: 7:11
- Country: United States
- Language: English

Bye, Bye Bluebeard is a Warner Bros. cartoon in the Merrie Melodies series released on October 21, 1949. The cartoon was directed by Arthur Davis and stars Porky Pig. The title is a play on the song "Bye Bye Blackbird". It is the final Looney Tunes entry directed by Davis before his animation unit was dissolved by Warner Bros. and also a rare example of a Warner Bros. short in which a character (apparently) dies without a comic postscript (for example, reappearing as an angel or a ghost).

== Plot ==
Porky Pig is eating large amounts of food to the rhythm of an exercise radio broadcast. A mouse then proceeds to sneak up and makes a sandwich out of Porky's finger by accident. Porky then tries to drive the mouse off, but then he is suddenly startled by a radio announcement that a Russian serial killer nicknamed "Bluebeard" is at large and Porky frantically bars and locks up his house. The mouse then decides to take advantage of Porky's fear by disguising himself as Bluebeard (causing Porky to literally jump out of his skin) and threatening Porky until he offers him some food. As Porky is busy getting the mouse a drink, he is alerted by a radio newsflash that gives Bluebeard's height as 6 ft 11 in (2.11 m). Realizing he was tricked, Porky then measures the rodent as 0 ft 3 in (0.08 m), confirming his suspicions. The rodent unsuccessfully tries to scare Porky with a few evil laughs, each now meeker than the last, and Porky then pursues the mouse with a meat cleaver. Spotting what appears to be the mouse's fake beard under the table, Porky yanks at it to force the mouse out but ends up pulling out the real Bluebeard (who had been apparently hiding underneath the table the whole time) by accident. An oblivious Porky sees the mouse in front of him, who points to Bluebeard behind Porky. Porky realizes the character whose beard he had been yanking on correctly matches the description from the radio broadcast, terrifying the pig.

Bluebeard then straps Porky to a rocket before proceeding to eat his food. He spots the mouse—who pretends to be Bluebeard's conscience—and tries to eat him, resulting in a chase that ends with Bluebeard getting hit five times by the mouse with pies to the face in various containers. Meanwhile, Porky manages to stop the fuse on the rocket and Bluebeard, deciding to ignore the mouse, builds a guillotine to kill Porky instead. Just as Porky is about to be executed by Bluebeard, the mouse decides to help Porky by tricking Bluebeard into eating some bombs, which the murderer mistakes for popovers. After consuming them, Bluebeard sees smoke emitting from his mouth and frantically takes to the medicine cabinet, mixing together every drug in it. Before he can administer the resulting concoction, however, the bombs inside him explode, killing him. In the final scene, Porky happily shares a meal with the mouse in gratitude for saving his life. The mouse indicates his fat stomach to the audience and pats it contently.

== Home media ==
Laserdisc:

- Guffaw and Order: Looney Tunes Fight Crime (18 March 1994)

VHS:

- Porky Pig: The Days of Swine and Roses (December 1994)

DVD:

- Looney Tunes Golden Collection: Volume 3, Disc 3 (2005)

Blu-Ray

- Looney Tunes Collector's Vault: Volume 1, Disc 2 (2025)

== See also ==
- Porky Pig filmography
- Looney Tunes and Merrie Melodies filmography (1940–1949)
