= The Hare Mail =

1931 film

- Directed by: Walter Lantz; Bill Nolan
- Produced by: Walter Lantz
- Starring: Mickey Rooney
- Music by: James Dietrich
- Animation by: Manuel Moreno; Ray Abrams; Fred Avery; Lester Kline; Vet Anderson
- Color process: Black and white
- Production company: Walter Lantz Productions
- Distributed by: Universal Pictures
- Release date: November 30, 1931
- Running time: 6 minutes, 17 seconds
- Language: English

The Hare Mail is a 1931 short animated film by Walter Lantz Productions and among the many featuring Oswald the Lucky Rabbit. The film is also one of the few where Mickey Rooney voiced the title character.

== Plot ==
Oswald is on the streets selling newspapers. Suddenly he hears a distress call coming from a nearby house.

Oswald comes to the house, and peeps through a window. Inside he sees a large turbulent bear interrogating a small girl about the money's location. Oswald tries to intervene, only to be easily pushed aside. When the girl refuses to tell, the bear turns to an old lynx who is the doll's grandfather. Oswald is at the police station and asks the police officers for help. The bear asks the lynx about the money, the lynx also refuses, much to the bear's anger. He slaps the lynx three times and steps on his feet. The bear ties the girl onto a lumber which is then placed to be sliced by a fan, which is used as a buzz saw. While Oswald is leading the cops, they end up getting distracted by eating at a restaurant without Oswald. The lynx finally gives in, and the bear immediately finds a sack of cash hidden within that feline's beard. Oswald returns to the house without the group of cops (Oswald is unaware before he noticed the cops were not there behind him) but the bear pushes Oswald out of the way and is already gone. Oswald stops the fan and unties the girl. Oswald finds a car outside of the girl's house and drives it.

The bear attempts to leave using a nearby aircraft and kicks the pilot out. Though the plane takes off, Oswald is able to grab onto its tail. However, the bear notices it and tries to separate Oswald by sawing the plane's tail but Oswald manages to build another plane with it, by using two exclamation marks above his head and turns them into a propeller. The bear then drops a sack onto Oswald's plane which is full of monkeys. The monkeys, however, teamed with Oswald to get back at the bear. Upon returning to the bear's plane, Oswald and the monkey manage to take back the money and dispose the bear and recover the money. When Oswald jumps to return to the ground, troubles are not over for him as his parachute refuses to deploy.

The girl and the lynx spot Oswald in the sky. They then use the lynx's long beard to cushion his fall. Oswald and the girl give each other a smooch.
