= No Parking Hare =

- Title card
- Directed by: Robert McKimson
- Story by: Sid Marcus
- Starring: Mel Blanc; John T. Smith (uncredited)
- Music by: Carl Stalling
- Animation by: Charles McKimson; Phil DeLara; Rod Scribner; Herman Cohen
- Layouts by: Bob Givens
- Backgrounds by: Richard H. Thomas
- Color process: Technicolor
- Production company: Warner Bros. Cartoons
- Distributed by: Warner Bros. Pictures; The Vitaphone Corporation
- Release date: May 1, 1954 (U.S.)
- Running time: 6:27
- Language: English

No Parking Hare is a 1954 Warner Bros. Looney Tunes theatrical animated short, directed by Robert McKimson and written by Sid Marcus. The short was released on May 1, 1954, and stars Bugs Bunny. Similar in plot to Homeless Hare, Bugs finds himself squaring off against a construction worker who wants to build over his hole in the ground.

== Plot ==
Construction is underway for a new freeway. The vibrations wake Bugs and cover him with dirt. Bugs confronts a beefy construction worker (voiced by John T. Smith), and when he realizes that a freeway may be built going through his home, Bugs refuses to move. The construction worker tries to blow up Bugs' burrow, but only succeeds in creating a crater with a large narrow pillar in the center, with Bugs' home still intact ("I hear ya knockin', but ya can't come in!") Since then, the construction worker continues to try to get Bugs out.

1) First, he climbs to the top of the pillar with various tools and threatens the rabbit, but Bugs emerges from a smaller hole at the bottom of the pillar, and cuts through the worker's ladder. This sends him falling into a pile of wet concrete, which he walks out of, drenched in concrete, before it sets. The worker then manages to free his head through the butt, with a dazed look on his face.

2) While Bugs is reading The Raven in a comic book ("Poe's Kiddie Komics" at that), the worker uses a rock-cutting saw to cut through the pillar. However, Bugs diverts the saw (using a small detour sign) downwards into his fuse box, electrocuting the worker. During the electrocution the worker in neon illustrations is in unusual poses other than him getting electrocuted; including The Thinker, Washington crossing the Delaware including two of his selves rowing the boat, and a Cancan Dancer.

3) While Bugs plays a nonsense song called "There Ain't No Place Like a Hole in the Ground" on a banjo, the worker drops a bomb from a helicopter onto his bed. Bugs jumps out of the bomb's way to turn the page of his music book, and the bomb bounces back to the helicopter before detonating, destroying the helicopter and leaving the worker hanging from the still-spinning rotors.

4) The worker attempts to crush the pillar with a 60-ton weight from a construction crane, but Bugs, disguised as another worker, manipulates him into crushing himself into the ground with the weight.

5) The worker climbs to the top of the pillar again, this time with some scaffolding, and attempts to light some dynamite. Bugs lights a match inside the bottom of the scaffolding, and the flame blows all the way to the top, prematurely lighting the dynamite and causing it to detonate before the worker can drop it into the hole.

6) Finally the worker tries to pour a large amount of concrete on top of the hole, but when it dries, he finds out that Bugs has diverted the concrete around his hole with an umbrella, reinforcing the pillar and defiantly placing a door and mailbox on top.

A shot of a local newspaper is shown afterwards, with a picture of Bugs on the front page, and a headline that reads "CITY COMPROMISES WITH RABBIT!!", followed by a scene that reveals that the freeway is ultimately abruptly diverted around the hole, in literally a half-circle. Bugs pops out of his hole to declare: "The sanctity of the American home must be presoived (preserved)!". This quote is from an attorney's argument in an 'alienation of affection' lawsuit involving a couple of the last name Kellogg in 1935 (Chicago Tribune archives).

== See also ==
- List of Bugs Bunny cartoons
