= Red-Headed Baby =

1931 film

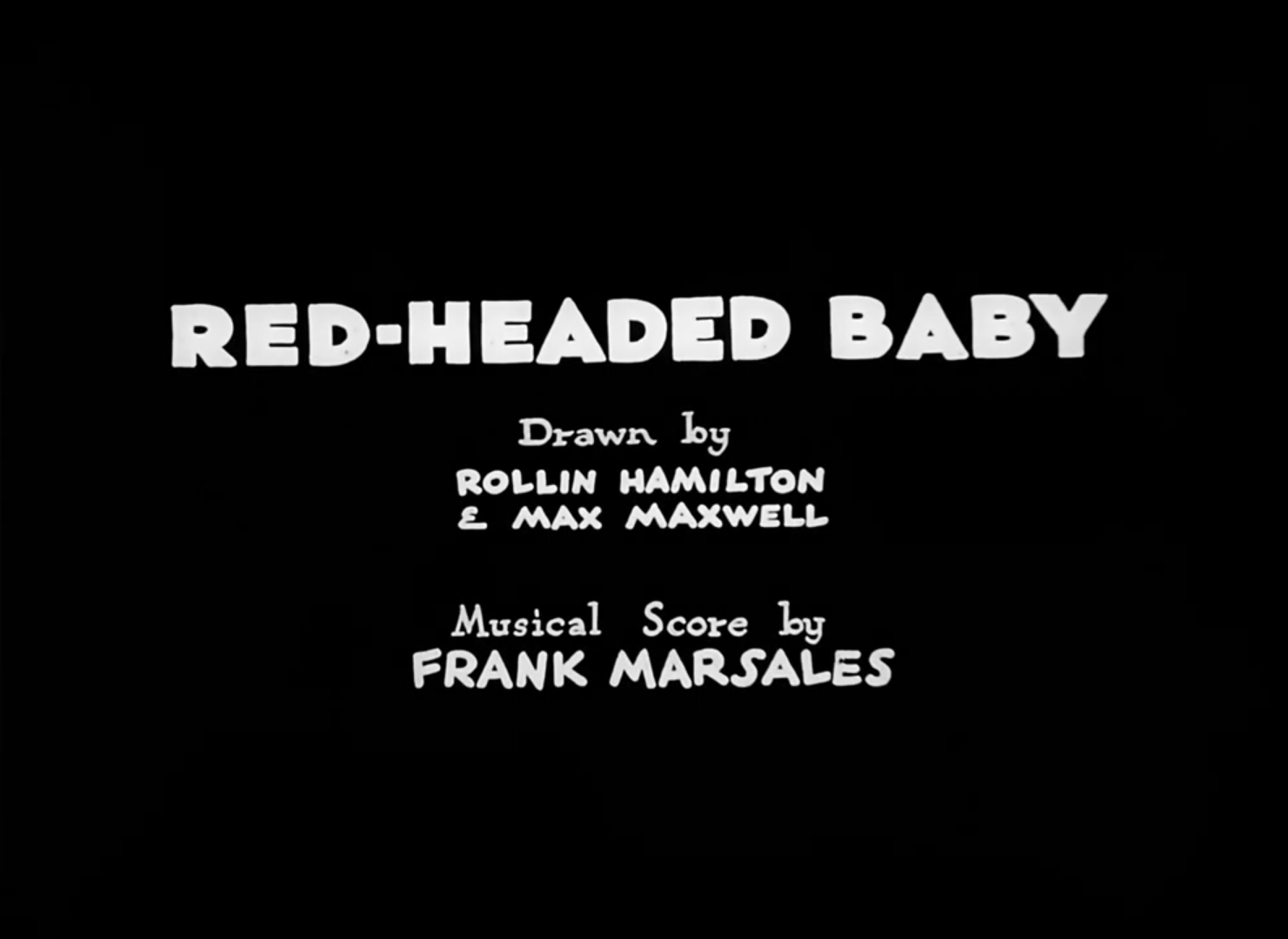
- Title card
- Directed by: Rudolf Ising
- Produced by: Hugh Harman; Rudolf Ising; Leon Schlesinger
- Music by: Frank Marsales
- Animation by: Rollin Hamilton; Max Maxwell
- Color process: Black-and-white
- Production companies: Harman-Ising Productions; Leon Schlesinger Productions
- Distributed by: Warner Bros. Pictures; The Vitaphone Corporation
- Release date: December 18, 1931; (earliest known date)
- Running time: 6:39
- Country: United States
- Language: English

Red-Headed Baby is a 1931 American animated comedy short film. It is the sixth film in the Merrie Melodies series. The short was released as early as December 18, 1931. (Note: Archived from a December 23 article, this is based on the fact that new cartoon shorts would premiere in theaters on Saturdays.) It was directed by Rudolf Ising.

The short is the first from Warner Bros. Pictures to not feature a recurring character, a staple of the Merrie Melodies series as it transitioned into an anthology series until it gradually lost its distinction from Looney Tunes; all previous cartoons had featured Bosko, Foxy, or Piggy.

== Plot ==
Full short

A toymaker creates a red-haired doll, who, after he (the toymaker) departs, comes to life. She discovers a radio, which she adjusts to play music and gleefully dances along. The other toys, mostly facsimiles of Bosko, dance along. The captain of a toy soldier regiment runs into her and falls in love, singing with her the titular song.

Meanwhile, a massive spider also falls for the doll and attempts to abduct her. The soldier fights it in swordplay, initially gaining an advantage and stabs the spider's buttocks. They fight until falling objects hit each other, incapacitating the soldier. The spider abducts the doll before the soldier wakes up. They ride a train while the soldier resuscitates himself with a steam engine before using a lasso to restrain the spider, knocking it off the train. It holds on to a balloon, only to have its buttocks burned by candles; it is defeated as the soldier fires a cork from a cannon, popping the balloon as it plunges to its death. The toys celebrate while the toymaker returns, delighted at the lively sight.
