= Piggy (Merrie Melodies) =

Warner Bros. theatrical cartoon character

- Merrie Melodies character
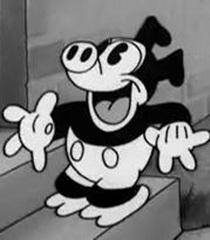
- Piggy in You Don't Know What You're Doin'!.
- First appearance: You Don't Know What You're Doin'! (1931)
- Last appearance: Hittin' the Trail for Hallelujah Land (1931)
- Created by: Rudolf Ising
- Voiced by: Johnny Murray

In-universe information
- Species: Domestic pig
- Gender: Male

Piggy is a fictional character created by Rudolf Ising for the Merrie Melodies series. He is a fat, black pig wearing a pair of shorts with two large buttons in the front, with his personality being nearly identical to Foxy. Like Foxy, he was quickly discarded in favor of one-shot cartoons, though he served as the series' mascot and appeared in the films' end title cards for a longer time.

== Merrie Melodies ==
Animator Rudolf Ising introduced Piggy to replace his previous character, Foxy, as the star of the Merrie Melodies series Ising was directing for producer Leon Schlesinger; his personality is identical to that of Foxy with minimal modifications. Piggy's coloration and dress were identical to those of the Walt Disney character Mickey Mouse before the advent of color film. John Kenworthy argues that, considering the fact that some sketches of mice that Hugh Harman had drawn in 1925 were the inspiration for the creation of Mickey Mouse, Harman and Ising never intended to copy Disney.

Despite their clichéd lead character, Ising's two Piggy shorts are well received by some critics. In the first, You Don't Know What You're Doin'!, Piggy visits a surreal nightclub where he heckles and plays with the club's jazz band. Cartoon historians Jerry Beck and Will Friedwald call this "the definitive Harman-Ising Warner film: the characters are cute, the humor is gross, the visuals are uninhibited, and the music is red hot."

This was followed by Hittin' the Trail for Hallelujah Land, also in 1931. Here, Piggy plays a steamboat captain who must rescue a drowning Uncle Tom. Due to its stereotypical portrayal of the Uncle Tom character, the cartoon is included among the so-called "Censored 11", Looney Tunes and Merrie Melodies shorts that are withheld from circulation due to their heavy use of ethnic stereotypes. Piggy never starred in another cartoon after that, although he continued to appear at the end of every short up to 1932's I Love a Parade. Nonetheless, Ising had only made two Piggy shorts in 1931 before he left Warner Bros. with partner Hugh Harman. Ising retained the rights to Piggy alongside his other characters before settling at Metro-Goldwyn-Mayer, though none of his characters save for Bosko were used during their tenure.
