= The Clown (1931 film) =

1931 film

- Directed by: Walter Lantz; Bill Nolan
- Produced by: Walter Lantz
- Starring: Shirley Reed
- Music by: James Dietrich
- Animation by: Manuel Moreno; Ray Abrams; Fred Avery; Lester Kline; Vet Anderson
- Color process: Black and white
- Production company: Walter Lantz Productions
- Distributed by: Universal Pictures
- Release date: December 21, 1931
- Running time: 6:02
- Language: English

The Clown is a 1931 short animated film by Universal Pictures and one of many in the Oswald the Lucky Rabbit series.

== Plot ==
Oswald, as the title implies, is a circus clown who performs acts in the big top along with his partner the live female stuffed doll, aka Kitty. After doing some acts involving horses, Kitty is being asked by the ringmaster to sign some kind of contract. Oswald is suspicious of the ringmaster's plans, and tries to intervene, only to be whipped away by the ringmaster.

While Oswald is performing his next act involving a dog and an elephant, the ringmaster tries again to get Kitty to sign. They are, however, interrupted once more by Oswald who finishes on time.

Next, it is time for Oswald and the ringmaster to make their appearance. Oswald enters a cannon, and the latter becomes the one to fire it. Kitty senses the ringmaster is up to something, and therefore rushes to the scene. When Oswald is fired from the cannon, Kitty grabs onto his legs. As they are sent airborne, they spin around, causing them to return like a boomerang and knock down the ringmaster. Oswald immediately performs again in the limelight, this time involving an invisible car created by pantomime.

Kitty returns to perform. Here, she suspends on the end of a rope which is pulled upward. The scheming ringmaster cuts the rope a little where it would break momentarily. Oswald is aware of this as the rabbit reenters the cannon. When Kitty plunges, Oswald launches out and catches her mid-air. The ringmaster tries to create more trouble for them by releasing a vicious gorilla, but instead of chasing the two performers, the gorilla pursues the ringmaster out of the big top.
