= Wonderland (1931 film) =

1931 film

- Directed by: Walter Lantz; Bill Nolan
- Starring: Shirley Reed
- Music by: James Dietrich
- Animation by: Manuel Moreno; Ray Abrams; Fred Avery; Lester Kline; Vet Anderson; Pinto Colvig
- Color process: Black and white
- Production company: Walter Lantz Productions
- Distributed by: Universal Pictures
- Release date: October 26, 1931
- Running time: 6:49
- Language: English

Wonderland is a 1931 short animated film by Walter Lantz Productions and part of a long-running short film series featuring Oswald the Lucky Rabbit. Contrary to its title, the film is not an adaptation of Alice in Wonderland but that of Jack and the Beanstalk.

== Plot ==
Oswald lives in a house with his grandmother. Although they have a low income, they don't feel so down. One day the landlord pays them a visit. The landlord tells them they have been unable to pay rent to the house in a timely manner, and therefore they need to move out in a few hours. While the grandmother is saddened by this, Oswald offers her hope as he intends to sell their cow.

Oswald heads to the outdoors, where he sells the cow to a wizard. In exchange, the wizard offers a sack of beans. Nevertheless, Oswald is pleased of what he got as he happily rushes back towards the house. On the way, he stumbles, and the beans in the bag drop into a hole in the ground. In no time the beans grow into a huge stalk that stretches toward the sky. One of the stalk's stems catches Oswald, and carries him upward.

When the stalk reaches its peak, Oswald is surprised to see a large castle in the clouds. Intrigued by the castle's presence, Oswald enters a window to explore the building. Upon going inside, Oswald finds an anthropomorphic doll tied onto a clock's pendulum. Oswald comes to and frees her. As gratitude, the doll tells him there is a hen that lays golden eggs.

Oswald and the doll reach a room where the special hen is located. When the doll asks for an egg, the hen is considerate to lay one. When Oswald himself asks, the hen, for some reason, refuses. The hen goes to make some noise which wakes up a giant bull. When the bull pursues them, Oswald and the doll have no choice but to leave. After exiting the castle, they climb down the stalk. The giant bull follows them in the same way.

Back on the ground, Oswald's grandmother is outdoors in another meeting with the landlord who comes to signal her family's move. When the grandmother spots Oswald coming down the stalk, the ruthless landlord goes on the cut down the tall plant with an ax, but in doing so, the landlord ends up smashed under the giant bull who is unconscious. Oswald and the doll make it safely to the ground and celebrate.

== Home media ==
The cartoon is available in the Attack of the 30s Characters film collection.
