= You Don't Know What You're Doin'! =

1931 film

- Title card
- Directed by: Rudolf Ising
- Produced by: Hugh Harman; Rudolf Ising; Leon Schlesinger
- Starring: Johnny Murray; Rochelle Hudson (both uncredited)
- Music by: Frank Marsales
- Animation by: Isadore Freleng; Norm Blackburn
- Color process: Black and white
- Production companies: Harman-Ising Productions; Leon Schlesinger Productions
- Distributed by: Warner Bros. Pictures; The Vitaphone Corporation
- Release date: October 21, 1931; (earliest known date)
- Running time: 6:54
- Country: United States
- Language: English

You Don't Know What You're Doin'! is a 1931 American animated comedy short film. It is the fourth film in the Merrie Melodies series and the first starring Piggy, one of the series' early recurring characters. It was released as early as October 21, 1931. (Note: The earliest listing for this short was October 24. Because of the previous archived link, it likely premiered on October 17, since new cartoon shorts would premiere in theaters on Saturdays.) It was directed by Rudolf Ising.

== Plot ==
Full short

A jazz orchestra plays the titular song, attracting a great crowd. Piggy picks up his girlfriend Fluffy and takes her to a theater where the orchestra is playing. Piggy mocks the trumpet soloist, then crashes the stage to play a corny chorus of the 1873 hit "Silver Threads Among the Gold" on the saxophone. Three shabbily-dressed drunken dogs in the balcony, mock Piggy with the title song "You Don't Know What You're Doin'", as Piggy defends his self-perceived "talent", but ironically the dogs get the audience's applause for their talent in singing.

One of the dogs bounces on a drum and joins Piggy onstage. The dog drinks from a bottle of bootleg hootch and belches in Piggy's face. The fumes on his breath instantly intoxicate Piggy. Piggy snatches the booze and runs out of the theater with the dog chasing him. He pours some of it into the radiator of a car, which drives throughout the city while the dog chases them. Both hallucinate the city to be lifelike and more confusing through their intoxication. The dog continues to chase after Piggy, but both of them eventually end up in the back of a truck which dumps them into a landfill.

== Music ==
The musical soundtrack was done by the then-nationally famous Abe Lyman Orchestra (though on some prints mis-attributed to the Gus Arnheim band), which adds a happy energy throughout the cartoon. The eccentric virtuoso trombone playing of Orlando "Slim" Martin is prominently featured. Martin played not only music but also some rather bizarre effects on his horn (the techniques he used to produce some of his sounds continue to puzzle other trombonists). His trombone solo representing the drunken automobile is especially memorable. The Schlesinger Studio had their sound effects department construct mechanical devices to roughly reproduce some of Martin's sounds, which became standard cartoon sound effects.

== Colorized version ==
The short was redrawn colorized in 1987. This version suffered from many issues, such as missing frames and animation, making it much inferior to the original.

== Home media ==
You Don't Know What You're Doin'! is available on Disc 3 of the Looney Tunes Golden Collection: Volume 6.

== See also ==
List of animated films in the public domain in the United States
