= Hittin' the Trail for Hallelujah Land =

1931 film

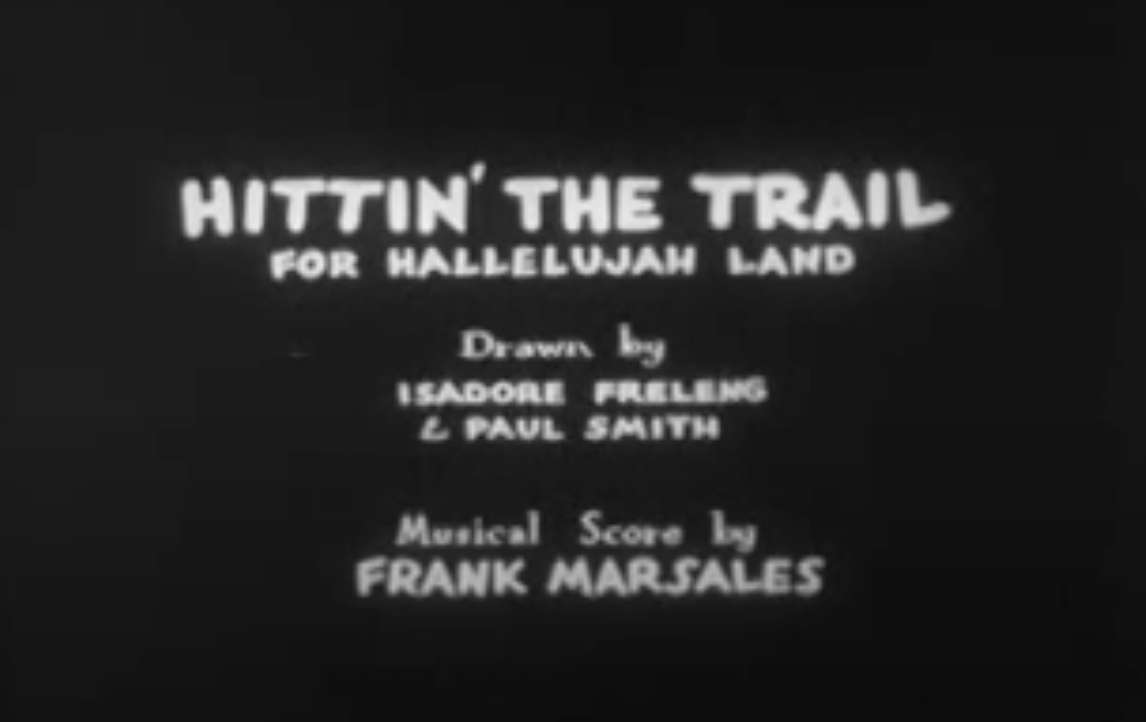
- Title card
- Directed by: Rudolf Ising (uncredited)
- Produced by: Hugh Harman; Rudolf Ising; Leon Schlesinger
- Starring: Johnny Murray; Rochelle Hudson; Rudolf Ising; Ken Darby (all uncredited)
- Music by: Frank Marsales
- Animation by: Isadore Freleng; Paul Smith
- Color process: Black and white
- Production companies: Harman-Ising Productions; Leon Schlesinger Productions
- Distributed by: Warner Bros. Pictures; The Vitaphone Corporation
- Release date: November 14, 1931
- Running time: 6:58
- Country: United States
- Language: English

Hittin' the Trail for Hallelujah Land is a 1931 American animated comedy short film. It is the fifth film in the Merrie Melodies series, and stars Piggy. This was Piggy's last theatrical appearance. It was released on November 14, 1931. It was directed by Rudolf Ising.

The minimal storyline centers on the plucky Piggy's efforts to rescue his girlfriend and a doglike Uncle Tom from perilous predicaments and villains. The short's use of the racial epithet "Uncle Tom" and use of blackface stereotypes prompted United Artists to withhold it from syndication in 1968, making it one of the Censored Eleven.

== Plot ==
Full short

Piggy drives a steamboat filled with stereotypes of African Americans down a river in an unsubtle reference to the 1928 Mickey Mouse film Steamboat Willie. His girlfriend Fluffy rides a carriage driven by a canine Uncle Tom. She gets on the steamboat and bids goodbye to Uncle Tom. Piggy dances on the railing for Fluffy, only to fall overboard and be caught by an alligator. He finds a floating log and uses his tail as a propeller to get away from the alligator, only to be launched back into the steamboat. He continues to dance on the railing without a thought.

Meanwhile, Uncle Tom sleeps as he returns home, only to be woken by his donkey's tail. He ties a stone to the donkey's tail, which accidentally throws him into a cemetery. He is unnerved by the appearance of three skeletons who mock him through song, though they are interrupted by a skeleton dog which they abuse by kicking him into the grave. Uncle Tom runs for his life and falls into the river, with Porky jumping into the river to save him. A vaudeville showman attempts to abduct Fluffy, who fights back before Piggy uses a crane to subdue him. The vaudeville is punished by having his genitals shredded by a sawblade while Piggy and Fluffy celebrate.

== Distribution ==
Hittin' the Trail for Hallelujah Land was released in theaters on November 14, 1931, by Warner Bros. Pictures. The cartoon has been in the public domain since 1959 after its copyright expired and was not renewed by owner United Artists Associated. However, the cartoon has been withheld from distribution since 1968. Hittin' the Trail for Hallelujah Land and ten other cartoons were deemed to feature racist depictions of African Americans that were too integral to the films for simple cuts to make them palatable for modern audiences. The cartoon has never been released on home media via official releases. These eleven cartoons make up the so-called Censored Eleven.

== Reception ==
On December 19, 1931, Motion Picture Herald said, "A New York Strand audience seemed to enjoy this number of the Merrie Melodies series in which popular song numbers accompany the animated cartoon figures."

== Credits ==
- Produced by Hugh Harman, Rudolf Ising and Leon Schlesinger
- Directed by Rudolf Ising (uncredited)
- Drawn by Isadore Freleng and Paul Smith
- Musical score by Frank Marsales

== See also ==
- List of animated films in the public domain in the United States
