= Sunday Go to Meetin' Time =

1936 film by Isadore Freleng

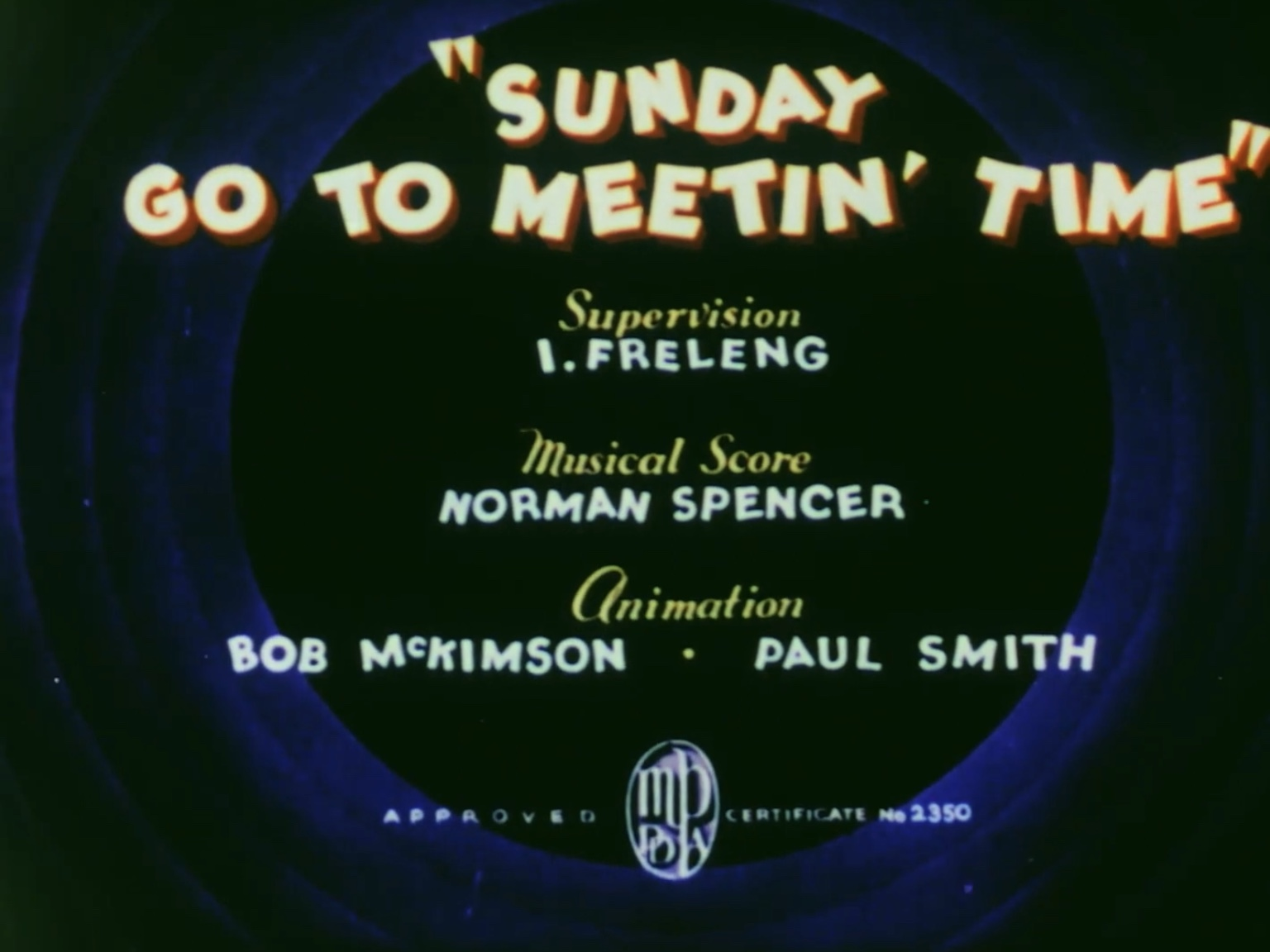
- Original title card
- Directed by: Isadore Freleng
- Produced by: Leon Schlesinger
- Starring: Ben Carter; Roy Glenn
- Music by: Norman Spencer
- Animation by: Bob McKimson; Paul Smith
- Color process: Technicolor
- Production company: Leon Schlesinger Productions
- Distributed by: Warner Bros. Productions; The Vitaphone Corporation
- Release date: August 8, 1936
- Running time: 7 min
- Country: United States
- Language: English

Sunday Go to Meetin' Time is a 1936 American animated comedy short film directed by Isadore Freleng. The short was released on August 8, 1936. It is the 62nd film in the Merrie Melodies series. It was re-released as a "Blue Ribbon" reissue in 1944. The name of the short comes from the colloquial adjective "sunday-go-to-meeting", describing something appropriate for church or otherwise presentable.

Because of the racial stereotypes of black people throughout the short, it is withheld from circulation, one of the "Censored Eleven" shorts. It was rejected by the British Board of Film Censors in 1936 and remains unreleased in the United Kingdom. It was banned in Australia and Germany.

== Plot ==
Ringing bells in a lazy town announce that it is time to go to church. A black preacher greets his parishioners as he sings the titular song. The bell is rung by church staff in humiliating manners. A minstrel show dandy and his gal jazz up the song as they dance their way to church. A mammy and old uncle shine the heads of children; a woman takes a bra off a clothesline to use as a bonnet for her twin children.

A mammy finds her husband Nicodemus playing dice and drags him off by the ear for his insolence. Nevertheless, Nicodemus sneaks out to steal a chicken, only to be knocked out in front of a poster of a judge. In his dream, he perceives the poster as "Hades Court of Justice" in Hell, where a demon reviews his crimes and sends him deeper into Hell, where he falls off a cliff and is flung like a pinball. Big-lipped demons carry him to the Devil himself, who sings to Nicodemus as a threat. Nicodemus is then prod with pitchforks, which are revealed to be chickens pecking at him. He notices the poster of the judge and repents, hearing the church bells and makes his way to the meeting house, just in time for mass.

== Reception ==
Boxoffice (Aug 22, 1936): "When a cartoon arouses enthusiasm in a projection room of hard-boiled critics, it denotes a hit. In Technicolor, this subject tells the story mostly in Negro rhythm and tuneful jazz."

National Exhibitor (Sept 5, 1936): "One of the best in the series this, however, should not be played on the same bill with Green Pastures. The shiftless darky doesn't want to go to church on Sunday, escapes from his wife, runs away, is knocked out chasing a chicken, dreams he is in Hell where he is made the ball in a bagatelle (pinball) game with other things happening to him. Finally he wakes up, heads for church. Color, animation, gags are above average with the whole thing a stand out. Very Good."
