= Sid Marcus =

American animator and director (1904–1985)

- Born: July 13, 1904; New York, U.S.
- Died: September 9, 1985 (aged 81); Santa Monica, California, U.S
- Occupations: Animator, director
- Years active: 1925–1979
- Employer(s): Associated Animators (1925–1926); Out of the Inkwell Films (1927–1930); Screen Gems (1930–1941; 1943–1946); Warner Bros. Cartoons (1947; 1952–1953); Walter Lantz Productions (1963–1966); DePatie–Freleng Enterprises (1969–1978)

Sidney Marcus (July 13, 1904 – September 9, 1985) was an American animator, story man and director, who worked at Screen Gems, Warner Bros. Cartoons, Walter Lantz Productions and DePatie–Freleng Enterprises.

== Career ==
Sid Marcus began his animation career in 1925 at Associated Animators working on the Mutt and Jeff cartoons. The studio closed by 1926 and Marcus began working at Fleischer Studios. His animation can be seen in the 1930 Talkartoon Hot Dog. In 1930 he and Fleischer colleague Dick Huemer were hired by Charles Mintz to make a series of cartoons for RKO in collaboration with Arthur Davis. After one season of Toby the Pup cartoons, the team began a new series of cartoons for Columbia instead, Scrappy. After Dick Huemer left the studio in 1933, Sid Marcus would take over direction of the Scrappy cartoons. In 1934, Sid Marcus directed the first Color Rhapsody, and would direct all four entries of the short lived Barney Google series. In 1941, Columbia let go of most of Screen Gems' staff, including Marcus, Davis and director Lou Lilly, (Ben Harrison, Manny Gould and Allen Rose had been fired before) with story man Frank Tashlin now in charge. Marcus' draft card from the time lists that he is employed at his own studio.

By 1943, Marcus was once again at Screen Gems, this time as a story man. He worked on the Li'l Abner, Fox and Crow, Flippy and Phantasy cartoons. He would even direct two cartoons, in place of Paul Sommer. In 1945, director Bob Wickersham would leave the studio with Marcus taking over his role. The studio shut down in 1946. Marcus would then become Arthur Davis' story man at Warner Bros. Cartoons where he wrote two cartoons: Bye, Bye Bluebeard and A Ham in a Role. Davis only finished one before his unit was disbanded in 1947 (Bye, Bye Bluebeard), Robert McKimson would complete the second (A Ham in a Role). Marcus was let go when the unit disbanded. He would return to Warner's in the early 1950s writing for McKimson. He was let go when the studio briefly shut down in 1953.

In the late 1950s Marcus worked on Joe Oriolo's Felix the Cat TV series, directed on Sam Singer's Courageous Cat and Minute Mouse in the early 1960s, directed at Walter Lantz's studio from 1963 to 1966, directed at Grantray-Lawrence Animation on The Marvel Super Heroes and Spider-Man (1967–1968), while freelancing stories for Walter Lantz and DePatie–Freleng Enterprises. By 1969 he was working on Here Comes the Grump at DePatie–Freleng where he would spend the rest of his career. His last credits were in 1979.

== Filmography ==
=== Theatrical Cartoons ===
Title	Release Date	Role	Series	Notes
The Museum	1930	Co-director with Dick Huemer	Toby the Pup	
The Fiddler	1930	Co-director with Dick Huemer	Toby the Pup	
The Miner	1930	Co-director with Dick Huemer	Toby the Pup	
The Showman	1930	Co-director with Dick Huemer	Toby the Pup	
The Bug House	1930	Co-director with Dick Huemer	Toby the Pup	
Circus Time	1931	Co-director with Dick Huemer	Toby the Pup	
The Milkman	1931	Co-director with Dick Huemer	Toby the Pup	
The Brown Derby	1931	Co-director with Dick Huemer	Toby the Pup	
Down South	1931	Co-director with Dick Huemer	Toby the Pup	
Hallowe’en	1931	Co-director with Dick Huemer	Toby the Pup	
Aces Up	1931	Co-director with Dick Huemer	Toby the Pup	
The Bull Thrower	1931	Co-director with Dick Huemer	Toby the Pup	
Yelp Wanted	1931	Animator	Scrappy	
The Little Pest	1931	Animator	Scrappy	
Sunday Clothes	1931	Animator	Scrappy	
The Dog Snatcher	1931	Animator	Scrappy	
Showing Off	1931	Animator	Scrappy	
Minding the Baby	1931	Animator	Scrappy	
The Chinatown Mystery	1932	Animator	Scrappy	
The Treasure Runt	1932	Animator	Scrappy	
Railroad Wretch	1932	Animator	Scrappy	
The Pet Shop	1932	Animator	Scrappy	
Stepping Stones	1932	Animator	Scrappy	
Battle of the Barn	1932	Animator	Scrappy	
Fare Play	1932	Animator	Scrappy	
Camping Out	1932	Animator	Scrappy	
The Black Sheep	1932	Animator	Scrappy	
The Great Bird Mystery	1932	Animator	Scrappy	
Flop House	1932	Animator	Scrappy	
The Bad Genius	1932	Animator	Scrappy	
The Wolf at the Door	1932	Animator	Scrappy	
Sassy Cats	1933	Animator	Scrappy	
Scrappy’s Party	1933	Animator	Scrappy	
The Beer Parade	1933	Animator	Scrappy	
The False Alarm	1933	Animator	Scrappy	
The Match Kid	1933	Director	Scrappy	
Technoracket	1933	Director	Scrappy	
The World’s Affair	1933	Director	Scrappy	
Movie Struck	1933	Director	Scrappy	
Sandman Tales	1933	Director	Scrappy	
Hollywood Babies	1933	Director	Scrappy	
Scrappy’s Auto Show	1933	Director	Scrappy	
Scrappy’s Art Gallery	1934	Director	Scrappy	
Scrappy’s Television	1934	Director	Scrappy	
Aw Nurse	1934	Director	Scrappy	
Scrappy’s Toy Shop	1934	Director	Scrappy	
Scrappy’s Dog Show	1934	Director	Scrappy	
Scrappy’s Theme Song	1934	Director	Scrappy	
Scrappy’s Relay Race	1934	Director	Scrappy	
The Great Experiment	1934	Director	Scrappy	
Scrappy’s Expedition	1934	Director	Scrappy	
The Trapeze Artist	1934	Director	Krazy Kat	
The Concert Kid	1934	Director	Scrappy	
Holiday Land	1934	Director	Color Rhapsody	
The Happy Butterfly	1934	Director	Scrappy	
The Gold Getters	1935	Director	Scrappy	
Little Rover	1935	Director	Color Rhapsody	
Neighbours	1935	Director	Color Rhapsody	
Tetched in the Head	1935	Director	Barney Google	
Patch Mah Britches	1935	Director	Barney Google	
The Bird Stuffer	1936	Director	Krazy Kat	
Spark Plug	1936	Director	Barney Google	
Major Google	1936	Director	Barney Google	
In My Gondola	1936	Director	Color Rhapsody	
A Boy and his Dog	1936	Director	Color Rhapsody	
The Novelty Shop	1936	Director	Color Rhapsody	
Mother Hen’s Holiday	1937	Director	Color Rhapsody	
Indian Serenade	1937	Director	Color Rhapsody	
Scary Crows	1937	Director	Color Rhapsody	
Hollywood Picnic	1937	Director	Color Rhapsody	
The Little Match Girl	1937	Director	Color Rhapsody	
The Air Hostess	1937	Director	Color Rhapsody	
The Foolish Bunny	1938	Director	Color Rhapsody	
Window Shopping	1938	Director	Color Rhapsody	
Poor Elmer	1938	Director	Color Rhapsody	
Little Moths Big Flame	1938	Director	Color Rhapsody	
Peaceful Neighbours	1939	Director	Color Rhapsody	
The House That Jack Built	1939	Director	Color Rhapsody	
Jitterbug Knights	1939	Director	Color Rhapsody	
Dreams on Ice	1939	Director	Color Rhapsody	
The Greyhound and the Rabbit	1940	Director	Color Rhapsody	
Tangled Television	1940	Director	Color Rhapsody	
The Mad Hatter	1940	Director	Color Rhapsody	
A Helping Paw	1941	Director	Color Rhapsody	
The Land of Fun	1941	Director	Color Rhapsody	
Tom Thumb’s Brother	1941	Director	Color Rhapsody	
The Cuckoo I.Q.	1941	Director	Color Rhapsody	
The Crystal Gazer	1941	Director	Phantasy	
Who’s Zoo in Hollywood	1941	Director	Color Rhapsody	
Red Riding Hood Rides Again	1941	Director	Color Rhapsody	
Amoozin’ But Confoozin’	1944	Story	Li’l Abner	
A Pee-Kool-Yar-Sit-Chee-Ay-Shun	1944	Story & Direction	Li’l Abner	
Mr. Moocher	1944	Story	Fox and Crow	
Kickapoo Juice	1944	Story	Li’l Abner	
Goofy News Views	1945	Story & Direction	Phantasy	
Booby Socks	1945	Story	Phantasy	
Phoney Baloney	1945	Story	Fox and Crow	
Unsure Runts	1946	Story	Fox and Crow	
Cagey Bird	1946	Story	Flippy	
Mysto Fox	1946	Story	Fox and Crow	
Up N’ Atom	1947	Director	Color Rhapsody	
Swiss Tease	1947	Director	Color Rhapsody	
Kitty Caddy	1947	Director	Phantasy	
Boston Beanie	1947	Director	Color Rhapsody	
Topsy Turkey	1948	Director	Phantasy	
The Coo-Coo Bird Dog	1949	Director	Color Rhapsody	
Cat-Tastrophy	1949	Director	Color Rhapsody	Final Columbia cartoon by Sid Marcus.
Bye, Bye Bluebeard	1949	Story	Merrie Melodies	
A Ham in a Role	1949	Story	Looney Tunes	
No Parking Hare	1954	Story	Looney Tunes	
Devil May Hare	1954	Story	Looney Tunes	Debut of Tasmanian Devil.
The Oily American	1954	Story	Merrie Melodies	
Gone Batty	1954	Story with Ben Washam	Looney Tunes	
All Fowled Up	1954	Story with Charles McKimson	Looney Tunes	
Lighthouse Mouse	1955	Story	Merrie Melodies	
The Hole Idea	1955	Story	Looney Tunes	
Dime to Retire	1955	Story	Looney Tunes	
Greedy Gabby Gator	1963	Director	Woody Woodpecker	
Stowaway Woody	1963	Director	Woody Woodpecker	
Salmon Loafer	1963	Director	Chilly Willy	
Coy Decoy	1963	Director	Woody Woodpecker	
The Tenant’s Racket	1963	Director	Woody Woodpecker	
Pesky Pelican	1963	Director	Chilly Willy	
Tepee For Two	1963	Director	Woody Woodpecker	
Science Friction	1963	Director	Woody Woodpecker	
Dumb Like a Fox	1964	Director	Woody Woodpecker	
Deep Freeze Squeeze	1964	Director	Chilly Willy	
Woody's Clip Joint	1964	Director	Woody Woodpecker	
Skinfolks	1964	Director	Woody Woodpecker	
Lighthouse Keeping Blues	1964	Director	Chilly Willy	
Get Lost! Little Doggy	1964	Director	Woody Woodpecker	
Ski-napper	1964	Director	Chilly Willy	
Three Little Woodpeckers	1965	Director	Woody Woodpecker	
Fractured Friendship	1965	Director	Chilly Willy	
Birds of a Feather	1965	Director	Woody Woodpecker	
Half Baked Alaska	1965	Director	Chilly Willy	
Sioux Me	1965	Director	Woody Woodpecker	
Pesky Guest	1965	Director	Chilly Willy	
Rough Riding Hood	1966	Director	Woody Woodpecker	
A Squeak in the Deep	1966	Story	Looney Tunes	
Teeny Weeny Meany	1966	Director	Chilly Willy	
Swing Ding Amigo	1966	Story	Looney Tunes	
Operation Shanghai	1967	Director	Chilly Willy	
Hot Time on Ice	1967	Story	Chilly Willy	
The Nautical Nut	1967	Story	Woody Woodpecker	
Chilly and the Woodpecker	1967	Story	Chilly Willy	
Think Before You Pink	1969	Story	Pink Panther	
Odd Ant Out	1970	Story	The Ant and the Aardvark	
The Foul Kin	1970	Story	Roland and Ratfink	
War and Pieces	1970	Story	Roland and Ratfink	
All Hams on Deck	1970	Story	Woody Woodpecker	
Chilly’s Cold War	1970	Story	Chilly Willy	
A Gooney is Born	1971	Story	Chilly Willy	
Rough Brunch	1971	Story	The Ant and the Aardvark	
Trick or Retreat	1971	Story	Roland and Ratfink	
Chilley’s Hide-A-Way	1971	Story	Chilly Willy	
The Rude Intruder	1972	Story	Chilly Willy	
Freeze a Jolly Good Fellow	1973	Director	The Blue Racer	
Giddy Up Woe	1974	Director	Hoot Kloot	
Mesa Trouble	1974	Director	Hoot Kloot	
Pinky Doodle	1976	Director	Pink Panther	
Pink Arcade	1978	Director	Pink Panther	
Dietetic Pink	1978	Director	Pink Panther	
Pink S.W.A.T.	1978	Director	Pink Panther	
Yankee Doodle Pink	1978	Director	Pink Panther	
Pink in the Drink	1978	Director	Pink Panther	
Pink Z-Z-Z	1978	Director	Pink Panther	
Toro Pink	1979	Director	Pink Panther	
Pink Pull	1979	Director	Pink Panther	
Doctor Pink	1979	Director	Pink Panther	

=== Television ===
Writer

- Felix the Cat (1958–1961)

Director

- Courageous Cat and Minute Mouse (1960–1962)
- Sinbad Jr. and His Magic Belt (1965–1966)
- The Marvel Super Heroes (1966)
- Spider-Man (1967–1968)
- Here Comes the Grump (1969)
- Doctor Dolittle (1970–1971)
- Baggy Pants and the Nitwits (1977)
- Misterjaw (1977–1978)

Animation Director

- Bailey's Comets (1973–1974)
