= Jungle Jitters =

1938 film by Isadore Freleng

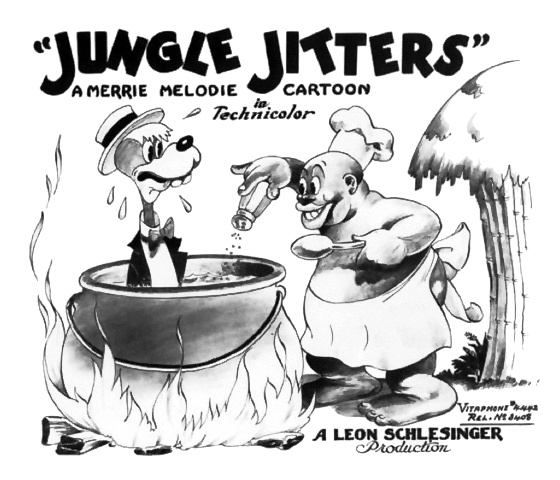
- Lobby card
- Directed by: Isadore Freleng
- Story by: George Manuell
- Produced by: Leon Schlesinger
- Starring: Mel Blanc; Tedd Pierce
- Music by: Carl W. Stalling
- Animation by: Phil Monroe
- Color process: Technicolor
- Production company: Leon Schlesinger Productions
- Distributed by: Warner Bros. Productions; The Vitaphone Corporation
- Release date: February 19, 1938
- Running time: 7 min
- Country: United States
- Language: English

Jungle Jitters is a 1938 American animated comedy short film directed by Isadore Freleng. The short was released on February 19, 1938. It is the 90th film in the Merrie Melodies series.

Because of the racial stereotypes of black people throughout the short, it prompted United Artists to withhold it from syndication within the United States in 1968. As such, the short was placed into the Censored Eleven, a group of eleven Merrie Melodies and Looney Tunes shorts withheld from official television distribution in the United States since 1968 due to heavy stereotyping of black people; because its copyright had already lapsed without renewal a year before this decision, it has remained publicly available through numerous unofficial distributors via secondhand prints.

== Plot ==
The full short

In a jungle, a primitive tribe of people with black noses and dark skin with light muzzles are going about their day, with the jungle elements being intertwined with modern-day gags; for example, the people dancing around a tent (in a style more reminiscent of Native American fire dances) when it turns into a makeshift merry-go-round, to the tune of "The Merry-Go-Round Broke Down", which promptly deflates and slows to a halt, and at least one of the denizens wears a top hat in resemblance of minstrel show stereotypes.

A traveling dog-faced salesman named Elmer (a parody of Al Pearce's character Elmer Blurt) comes by to offer them the latest in "assorted useful, useless, utensils". The natives, after initially trying their hardest to avoid him, decide he would make a delicious dinner, so they invite him in, ransack his goods, and throw him into a cauldron while a mammy chef prepares him as soup. They proceed to familiarize themselves with vacuum cleaners, batteries, light bulbs, etc.

Meanwhile, in the Palace, Africans were hungry for dinner, followed by the white village queen (a parody of Tizzie Lish) hears of the arrival of the salesman, and desperate for a husband, she brings him in. As Elmer delivers his sales pitch, the queen sees him as Clark Gable and Robert Taylor and is smitten, demanding her to be married right away. The two are rushed into a marriage, and when asked to kiss the bride, Elmer panics and jumps back into the cauldron; in a closing shot, he curses his captors with the hope that "they all get indigestion" as he submerges into the pot to his death.

== Reception ==
The Film Daily said on January 31, 1938, "Producer Leon Schlesinger goes to darkest Africa in this one with a highly amusing set of characters... There are some very funny sequences and gags, with the characterizations very amusing."

National Exhibitor agreed on February 1: "It sounds forced to say that this is better than the best so far, but that is what one must say about a series that improves continually. This is full of cute little touches that will be best appreciated by a class audience, but will still have the masses chuckling."

== See also ==
- List of animated films in the public domain in the United States
