= Dick Huemer =

American animator (1898–1979)

- Born: Richard Huemer; January 2, 1898; New York City, U.S.
- Died: November 30, 1979 (aged 81); Burbank, California, U.S.
- Occupations: Animator, director
- Years active: 1916–1973
- Employer: Raoul Barré Cartoon Studios (1916–1923) Fleischer Studios (1923–1930) Screen Gems (1930–1933) Walt Disney Productions (1933–1973)

Richard "Dick" Huemer (January 2, 1898 – November 30, 1979) was an American animator in the Golden Age of Animation.

== Career ==
While as an artist-illustrator living in the Bronx, New York City, Huemer first began his career in animation at the Raoul Barré cartoon studio in 1916. He joined Inkwell Studios in 1923 where he developed the Koko the Clown character. He redesigned the "Clown" for more efficient animation production and moved the Fleischer's away from their dependency upon the Rotoscope for fluid animation. Huemer created Ko-Ko's canine companion, Fitz.

Most importantly, Huemer set the drawing style that gave the series its distinctive look. Later he moved to Hollywood and worked as an animator and director for Screen Gems, creating the character Scrappy. He moved to Walt Disney Productions, where he remained for the duration of his career, except for a three-year hiatus from 1948–51 when he pioneered animated TV commercials and created with Paul Murry The Adventures of Buck O'Rue comic strip.

Some of Huemer's most creative work was done in partnership with Joe Grant. Examples include Fantasia (story director), Dumbo (screenplay), and several propaganda films to advance the U.S. war effort during World War II. Atypically, Huemer and Grant submitted Dumbo to Walt Disney not as a completed storyboard, but as a series of storyboard "chapters," each ending in a cliffhanger. This was intended to pique Walt Disney's enthusiasm for the project, and it worked. Huemer worked at Disney from April 16, 1933, to February 28, 1973.

== Awards and accomplishments ==
Huemer was given a Mousecar by the Disney Studio in February 1973 at a ceremony attended by a number of his peers.

He accepted the Winsor McCay Award at the Annie Awards in October 1978 and was introduced by Ward Kimball.

On October 10, 2007, Huemer's son Dr. Richard P. Huemer accepted the Disney Legends award that was given in his father's name.

== Filmography ==
=== Director ===
- Goofy and Wilbur (1939)
- The Whalers (1938)
- Scrappy's Auto Show (1933)
- Hollywood Babies (1933)
- Sandman Tails (1933)
- Movie Struck (1933)
- The World's Affair (1933)
- Technocracked (1933)
- The Match Kid (1933)
- False Alarm (1933)
- Beer Parade (1933)
- Scrappy's Party (1933)
- Sassy Cats (1933)
- The Wolf at the Door (1932)
- The Bad Genius (1932)
- Flop House (1932)
- The Great Bird Mystery (1932)
- Black Sheep (1932)
- Camping Out (1932)
- Fare Play (1932)
- Battle of the Barn (1932)
- Stepping Stones (1932)
- The Pet Shop (1932)
- Railroad Wretch (1932)
- The Treasure Runt (1932)
- Minding the Baby (1932)
- The Chinatown Mystery (1932)
- Showing Off (1931)
- The Dog Snatcher (1931)
- Sunday Clothes (1931)
- Little Pest (1931)
- Yelp Wanted (1931)
- The Museum (1930)

=== Writer ===
==== Features ====
- Alice in Wonderland (1951)
- Peter and the Wolf (1946)
- Make Mine Music (1946)
- Saludos Amigos (1943)
- Dumbo (1941)
- The Reluctant Dragon (1941)
- Fantasia (1940) (story director)

==== TV shows (some dates uncertain) ====
- Disneyland: "An Adventure in Art" (1958) #5694
- Disneyland: "Tricks of Our Trade" (1956) #5664
- Disneyland: "The Plausible Impossible" (1956) #5644
- Disneyland: "The Story of the Animated Drawing" (1955) #5605
- "Concerto con Doodle" (195?) (never aired)
- The Roy Williams Show (c. 1950)

==== Cartoons ====
- Toot, Whistle, Plunk and Boom (1953)*
- Melody (1953)
- Chicken Little (1943)
- Reason and Emotion (1943)
- Education for Death (1942)
- Der Fuehrer's Face (1942)*
- The New Spirit (1942)

=== Animator ===
- Wynken, Blynken and Nod (1938)
- Lonesome Ghosts (1937)
- Little Hiawatha (1937) ...a.k.a. Hiawatha (1937)
- Don Donald (1937)
- Mickey's Elephant (1936)
- Alpine Climbers (1936)
- Mickey's Rival (1936)
- Mickey's Polo Team (1936)
- Broken Toys (1935)
- Music Land (1935)
- Mickey's Garden (1935)
- Water Babies (1935)
- The Band Concert (1935)
- The Tortoise and the Hare (1934)*
- The Goddess of Spring (1934)
- Peculiar Penguins (1934)
- The Wise Little Hen (1934)
- Funny Little Bunnies (1934)
- The Grasshopper and the Ants (1934)
- The China Shop (1934)
- The Night Before Christmas (1933)
- Giantland (1933)
- The Steeplechase (1933)
- The Pied Piper (1933)
- Puppy Love (1933)
- Lullaby Land (1933)
- By the Light of the Silvery Moon (1927)
- Koko In 1999 (1927)
- Hell Is Freezing Over (c. 1926)
- Koko the Barber (1925)
- Oh Mabel (1924)

More for Fleischer, Associated Animators, and Raoul Barré – to be updated later.

* Denotes AMPAS ("Academy") Award.

== Miscellaneous at Disney's ==
=== Books ===
- Baby Weems
- 20,000 Leagues Under the Sea
- True Life Adventures

=== Newspaper features ===
- True-Life Adventures (March 14, 1955 – February 27, 1973)

=== Phonograph records ===
- The Who-zis and The What-zis
- Melody
- Toot, Whistle, Plunk, and Boom
- A Christmas Adventure in Disneyland

== Sources ==
- Huemer.com

Note to editors, this link does not work
