= Kartunes =

Animated film series

Title card of the series

Kartunes is a series of 12 theatrical short subjects produced by Famous Studios and released by Paramount Pictures from 1951 to 1953. These were identical in format to the studio's previous Screen Songs cartoons. The first half of each subject had various blackout gags related to the premise of the film, and the second half invited the audience to sing along "with the bouncing ball" as song lyrics were shown on the screen. The opening theme of each cartoon was "Sing a Song of Sixpence".

After Paramount Pictures lost the rights to the Screen Songs name, and the term "Bouncing Ball" couldn't be used anymore, the series became known as Kartunes. Even though the series ended in 1953, Famous quietly made two more "bouncing ball" shorts, Candy Cabaret (released in 1954) and Hobo's Holiday (released in 1963), as part of the Noveltoons series.

== Filmography ==
Film	Song	Director	Story	Animation	Scenics	Original release date
Vegetable Vaudeville	"Yes! We Have No Bananas"	Isadore Sparber	Larz Bourne	Myron Waldman; Nick Tafuri	Robert Little	November 9, 1951
Snooze Reel	"I Got Spurs that Jingle Jangle Jingle"	Seymour Kneitel	Joe Stultz	Al Eugster; Wm. B. Pattengill	Robert Owen	December 28, 1951
Off We Glow	"The Glow-Worm"	Isadore Sparber	Larz Bourne; Tex Henson	Dave Tendlar; Tom Golden	Robert Little	February 29, 1952
Fun at the Fair	"Wait 'Till the Sun Shines, Nellie"	Isadore Sparber	Larz Bourne	Al Eugster; Wm. B. Pattengill	Robert Owen	May 9, 1952
Dizzy Dinosaurs	"Sweet Adeline"	Seymour Kneitel	Isadore Klein	Myron Waldman; Gordon Whittier	Robert Little	July 4, 1952
Gag and Baggage	"I've Been Working on the Railroad"	Isadore Sparber	Larz Bourne	Dave Tendlar; Tom Golden	Robert Little	August 8, 1952
Forest Fantasy	"By the Light of the Silvery Moon"	Seymour Kneitel	Isadore Klein	Myron Waldman; Larry Silverman	Anton Loeb	November 14, 1952
Hysterical History	"Yankee Doodle Boy"	Isadore Sparber	Irving Spector	Al Eugster; George Germanetti	Robert Owen	January 23, 1953
Philharmaniacs	"Alexander's Ragtime Band"	Seymour Kneitel	Isadore Klein	Tom Johnson; John Gentilella	Jack Henegan	April 3, 1953
Aero-Nutics	"Come Josephine in My Flying Machine"	Seymour Kneitel	Irving Spector	Al Eugster; George Germanetti	Robert Owen	May 8, 1953
Invention Convention	"Let Me Call You Sweetheart"	Isadore Sparber	Isadore Klein	Al Eugster; Wm. B. Pattengill	Anton Loeb	June 10, 1953
No Place Like Rome	"Oh Ma-Ma (The Butcher Boy)"	Isadore Sparber	Irving Spector	Al Eugster; George Germanetti	Jack Henegan	July 31, 1953

Note: Hysterical History is the only Kartunes short in the public domain.
Note 2: Dizzy Dinosaurs and Forest Fantasy are the only Kartune films which featuring Inchy the Worm.

== TV distribution ==
The cartoons were later sold to TV distribution by Harvey Films to replace the original titles with the Harvey reissued ones, later being syndicated by Worldvision Enterprises. Currently, the Harvey reissued cartoons are distributed by NBCUniversal Television Distribution through its DreamWorks Animation subsidiary and their DreamWorks Classics unit.
