= Harry Rose =

Harry Rose may refer to:

- Harry M. Rose (1906–1986), microbiologist
- Harry Rose (footballer) (1870–1946), English footballer
- Harry Rose (vaudevillian) (1892–1962), American comedian
- Harry Rose, character in Orchis Fatalis
- Harry V. Rose, husband of Helen Rose
- Harry Keller Rose, director of Rose of Cimarron
- Harry Rose, lyricist of "Kitty from Kansas City"

== See also ==
- Henry Rose (disambiguation)
- Harold Rose (1900–1990), English footballer and football manager
- Harold Rose (economist) (1923–2018), English economist
