= The Sidewalks of New York (film) =

1925 film

- Directed by: Dave Fleischer
- Produced by: Max Fleischer
- Music by: song "The Sidewalks of New York" by Charles Lawlor and James W. Blake
- Production companies: Out of the Inkwell Studios (1925 version); Fleischer Studios (1929 version)
- Distributed by: Red Seal Pictures (1925 version); Paramount Famous Lasky Corporation (1929 version)
- Release dates: May 1925 (Red Seal); February 5, 1929 (Paramount)
- Country: United States
- Language: English

The Sidewalks of New York (1925 and 1929) are two cartoon short films made by animation pioneers Max Fleischer and Dave Fleischer, both films using the 1894 song "The Sidewalks of New York".

Both films feature the "Follow the Bouncing Ball" gimmick, and are also known under the title "East Side, West Side", the informal title of the original song. The Fleischer brothers, Lee DeForest, Hugo Riesenfeld, and Edwin Miles Fadiman formed Red Seal Pictures to release the Song Car-Tunes series, which started in May 1924 with the release of Oh Mabel.

The first film, released in May 1925, was made for the Song Car-Tunes series and was filmed in the DeForest Phonofilm sound-on-film process. The Song Car-Tunes series eventually totaled 36 films, of which 19 were made in sound using Phonofilm.

The film was remade in 1929 and was released on February 5 by Paramount Famous Lasky Corporation through the Fleischer brothers' new studio Fleischer Studios with a new soundtrack recorded in RCA Photophone. The second film was the first entry in the Fleischers' new series Screen Songs and the first by Fleischer Studios overall.
