= Kitty from the City =

Kitty from the City may refer to:

- Kitty from the City, a 1916 film directed by Harry Wulze
- Kitty from the City, a 1971 Woody Woodpecker film

== See also ==
- "Kitty from Kansas City", a song popularized by Rudy Vallée in 1930
- Kitty from Kansas City (film), a 1931 Betty Boop short animated film
