= Screen Songs =

Series of animated cartoons

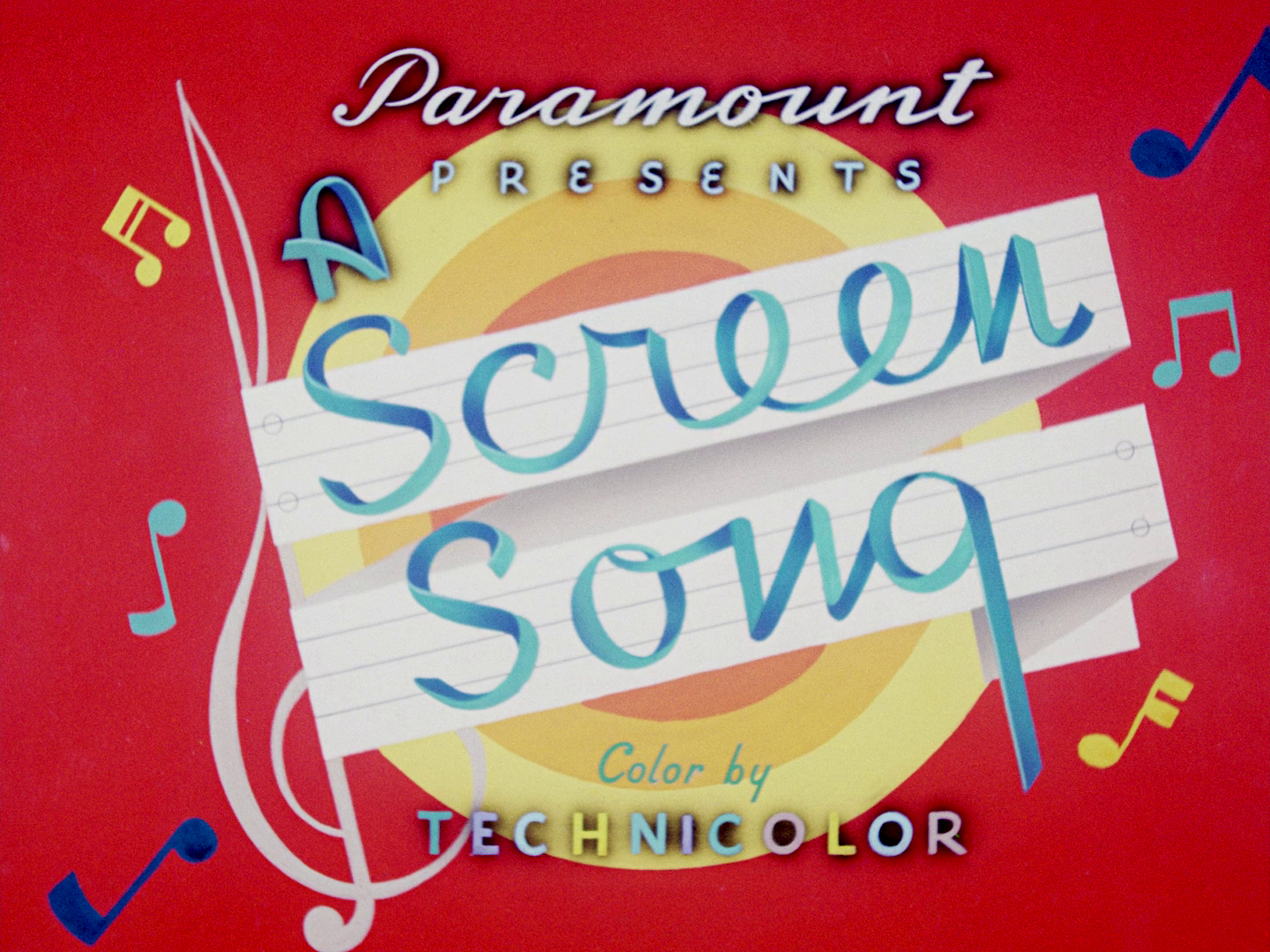
- The series' opening logo from the revival years
- Production companies: Fleischer Studios; Famous Studios
- Distributed by: Paramount Pictures
- Running time: 6–7 minutes (one reel)
- Country: United States
- Language: English

Screen Songs (formerly known as KoKo Song Car-Tunes) are a series of animated cartoons produced at the Fleischer Studios and distributed by Paramount Pictures between 1929 and 1938. Paramount brought back the sing-along cartoons in 1945, now in color and produced by Fleischer Studios' successor Famous Studios, and released them regularly through 1951.

== History ==
The Screen Songs are a continuation of the earlier Fleischer series Song Car-Tunes in color. They are sing-along shorts featuring the famous "bouncing ball", a sort of precursor to modern karaoke videos. They often featured popular melodies of the day. The early Song Car-Tunes were among the earliest sound films, produced two years before The Jazz Singer. They were largely unknown at the time because their release was limited to the chain of 36 theaters operated by The Red Seal Pictures Company, which was equipped with the early Lee DeForest Phonofilm sound reproduction equipment. The Red Seal theater chain—formed by the Fleischers, DeForest, Edwin Miles Fadiman, and Hugo Riesenfeld—went from the East Coast to Columbus, Ohio.

Between May 1924 and September 1926, the Fleischers released 36 Song Car-Tunes series, with 19 using the Phonofilm sound-on-film process. The films included Oh Mabel, Come Take a Trip in My Airship, Darling Nelly Gray, Has Anybody Here Seen Kelly?, and By the Light of the Silvery Moon. Beginning with My Old Kentucky Home (1926), the cartoons featured the "follow the bouncing ball" gimmick, that lead the audience singing along with the film. The other 17 films in the Song Car-Tunes series were silent, designed to be shown with live music in movie theaters.

The Fleischers were ahead of the sound revolution, and just missed the actual change when Red Seal Pictures filed for bankruptcy in the fall of 1926.

== Releases after Red Seal Pictures ==
In 1928, the Weiss Brothers reissued through their Artclass Pictures company and other independent distributors a number of the silent "Ko-Ko Song Car-tunes" with new animation created for the beginnings, removing the original titles and opening original footage.

- For Me and My Gal (1926)
- I Love to Fall Asleep (1926)
- In My Harem (1926)
- Just Try to Picture Me (1926)
- My Sweetie (1926)
- Old Pal (1926)
- Alexander's Ragtime Band (1926)
- The Sheik of Araby (1926)
- Annie Laurie (1926)
- Oh! How I Hate to Get Up in the Morning (1926)
- When I Lost You (1926)
- Margie (1926)
- When the Midnight Choo-Choo Leaves for Alabam' (1926)
- Oh! What a Pal Was Mary (1926)
- Everybody's Doing It (1926)
- Yak-A-Hula-Hick-A-Doola (1926)
- My Wife's Gone to the Country (1926)
- My Old Kentucky Home (1926)
- Beautiful Eyes (1926)
- Finiculee Finicula (1926)
- Micky (1926)
- When the Angelus Was Ringing (1926)
- When I Leave This World Behind (1926)
- Tumbledown Shack in Athlone (1927)
- The Rocky Road to Dublin (1927)
- Call Me Up Some Rainy Afternoon (1927)
- Oh I Wish I Was in Michigan (1927)

== New contract with Paramount Pictures ==
The Fleischers signed a new contract with Paramount Pictures in late 1928. Beginning in February 1929, the song cartoons returned under a new name, Screen Songs, using the Western Electric sound-on-film process. The first was The Sidewalks of New York (East Side, West Side) released on 5 February 1929. In the 1930s, the shorts began to feature such musical guest stars as Lillian Roth, Ethel Merman, Cab Calloway, Rudy Vallée, The Mills Brothers, the Boswell Sisters, and others. The series, which eventually focused on many of the "Big Bands" of "The Swing Era" continued until 1938. In 1945, Famous Studios, successors to the Fleischers, revived the Screen Songs as an all animated series. The earliest Screen Song released as part of the Noveltoons series, When G.I. Johnny Comes Home, was released on February 2, 1945.

== Filmography ==
=== Fleischer Studios ===
All films produced in 1930 or before are in the public domain.

=== 1929 ===
No.	Film	Characters/Musicians	Animation	Release date	Video if in the public domain
1	The Sidewalks of New York			February 5, 1929	
2	Yankee Doodle Boy			March 1, 1929	
3	Old Black Joe			April 5, 1929	
4	Ye Olde Melodies			May 3, 1929	
5	Daisy Bell			May 31, 1929	
6	Mother, Pin a Rose on Me			July 6, 1929	
7	Dixie			August 17, 1929	
8	Chinatown, My Chinatown	One-shot Chinese characters		August 29, 1929	
9	Goodbye My Lady Love			August 31, 1929	
10	My Pony Boy			September 13, 1929	
11	Smiles	One-shot human quartet		September 27, 1929	
12	Oh, You Beautiful Doll	Tommy and Mariah Cat		October 14, 1929	
13	After the Ball	Charles K. Harris and Fitz the dog (called fido in this short)		November 8, 1929	
14	Put on Your Old Grey Bonnet	One-shot animal characters		November 22, 1929	
15	I've Got Rings on My Fingers	One-shot black cannibal characters and (human) Irish cop		December 17, 1929	
=== 1930 ===
16	Bedelia	Bimbo		January 3, 1930	
17	In the Shade of the Old Apple Tree	One-shot bear characters		January 18, 1930	
18	I'm Afraid to Go Home in the Dark	Bimbo		January 30, 1930	
19	The Prisoner's Song	Bimbo		March 1, 1930	
20	I'm Forever Blowing Bubbles	One-shot mouse characters		March 15, 1930	
21	La Paloma	Bimbo		April 12, 1930	
22	Yes! We Have No Bananas	One-shot animal characters		April 26, 1930	
23	Come Take a Trip in My Airship	Mariah Cat (here called "Kitty")		April 26, 1930	
24	In the Good Old Summer Time	One-shot animal characters		June 6, 1930	
25	A Hot Time in the Old Town Tonight	One-shot mouse characters	Seymour Kneitel	August 1, 1930	
26	The Glow-Worm	Special bilingual entry Song sung first in German, then in English.	Rudy Zamora	August 23, 1930	
27	The Stein Song	One-shot animal characters	Rudy Zamora; Shamus Culhane	September 6, 1930	
28	Strike Up the Band	One-shot dog sailors	Al Eugster	September 27, 1930	
29	My Gal Sal	Bimbo	Willard Bowsky; Rudolph Eggeman	October 18, 1930	
30	Mariutch	Bimbo (in Italian lead role)	Grim Natwick; George Cannata	November 15, 1930	
31	On a Sunday Afternoon	One-shot dog characters and (briefly) Bimbo	Rudy Zamora; Shamus Culhane	November 29, 1930	
32	Row, Row, Row	Bimbo (in villainous lead role) and Betty Boop prototype	Seymour Kneitel; Rudolph Eggeman	December 20, 1930	
=== 1931 ===
33	Please Go 'Way and Let Me Sleep	One-shot animal characters	Grim Natwick; George Cannata	January 10, 1931	
34	By the Beautiful Sea	One-shot bear characters	Willard Bowsky; Reuben Timinsky (later Reuben Timmins)	January 24, 1931	
35	I Wonder Who's Kissing Her Now	Tommy and Mariah Cat	Al Eugster; George Cannata	February 14, 1931	
36	I'd Climb the Highest Mountain	Bimbo	Seymour Kneitel; Reuben Timinsky	March 7, 1931	
37	Somebody Stole My Gal	Bimbo	George Cannata; Reuben Timinsky	March 20, 1931	
38	Any Little Girl That's a Nice Little Girl	Tommy Cat and Betty Boop prototype	Seymour Kneitel	April 18, 1931	
39	Alexander's Ragtime Band	Bimbo	Rudy Zamora; Shamus Culhane	May 9, 1931	
40	And the Green Grass Grew All Around	One-shot bug characters		May 30, 1931	
41	My Wife's Gone to the Country	Bimbo and (briefly) Betty Boop		May 31, 1931	
42	That Old Gang of Mine	Mariah and (briefly) Tommy Cat		July 11, 1931	
43	Betty Co-ed	Rudy Vallée, Betty Boop prototype		August 1, 1931	
44	Mr. Gallagher and Mr. Shean	Gallagher and Shean	Al Eugster	August 29, 1931	
45	You're Driving Me Crazy	Harriet Lee, vocalist (Radio Queen of 1931-32); Snooks and his Memphis Ramblers		September 19, 1931	
46	Little Annie Rooney	Bimbo (in "Joe" role of song)	Seymour Kneitel; Bernard Wolf	October 10, 1931	
47	Kitty from Kansas City	Rudy Vallée, Betty Boop		October 31, 1931	
48	By the Light of the Silvery Moon	Bimbo and (briefly) Betty Boop	Seymour Kneitel; Myron Waldman	November 14, 1931	
49	My Baby Just Cares for Me	Eddie Cantor, Bimbo (monkeylike design)		December 5, 1931	
50	Russian Lullaby	Arthur Tracy, Aloysius		December 26, 1931	
=== 1932 ===
51	Sweet Jennie Lee	One-shot animal characters		January 9, 1932	
52	Show Me the Way to Go Home	One-shot animal characters		January 30, 1932	
53	When the Red, Red Robin Comes Bob, Bob, Bobbin' Along	One-shot bird characters		February 19, 1932	
54	Wait Till the Sun Shines, Nellie	The Round Towners Quartet, Betty Boop and Bimbo	Seymour Kneitel; Myron Waldman	March 4, 1932	
55	Just One More Chance	Art Jarrett, Betty Boop	Shamus Culhane Dave Tendlar	April 1, 1932	
56	Oh! How I Hate to Get Up in the Morning	Les Reis and Artie Dunn, Betty Boop	Seymour Kneitel Bernard Wolf	April 22, 1932	
57	Shine On Harvest Moon	Alice Joy, one-shot animal characters	Shamus Culhane Reuben Timinsky	May 6, 1932	
58	Let Me Call You Sweetheart	Ethel Merman, Betty Boop and Bimbo	Shamus Culhane Dave Tendlar	May 20, 1932	
59	I Ain't Got Nobody	The Mills Brothers, one-shot animal characters	Willard Bowsky Tom Bonfiglio	June 17, 1932	
60	You Try Somebody Else	Ethel Merman, Betty Boop		July 29, 1932	
61	Rudy Vallée Melodies	Rudy Vallée, Betty Boop		August 5, 1932	
62	Down Among the Sugar Cane	Lillian Roth, one-shot animal characters	Shamus Culhane William Henning	August 26, 1932	
63	Just a Gigolo	Irene Bordoni, Betty Boop	Shamus Culhane Reuben Timinsky	September 9, 1932	
64	School Days	Gus Edwards, one-shot animal characters	William Henning Dave Tendlar	September 30, 1932	
65	Romantic Melodies	Arthur Tracy, Betty Boop and Bimbo	Seymour Kneitel; Bernie Wolf	October 21, 1932	
66	Sleepy Time Down South	The Boswell Sisters, one-shot animal characters	Seymour Kneitel; Bernie Wolf	November 11, 1932	
67	Sing a Song	James Melton, one-shot animal characters	Seymour Kneitel; Myron Waldman	December 2, 1932	
68	Time on My Hands	Ethel Merman, Betty Boop	Willard Bowsky; Thomas Goodson	December 23, 1932	
=== 1933 ===
69	Dinah	The Mills Brothers, one-shot animal characters	Dave Tendlar; William Henning	January 13, 1933	
70	Ain't She Sweet?	Lillian Roth, Tommy and Mariah Cat	Seymour Kneitel; Tom Johnson	February 3, 1933	
71	Reaching for the Moon	Arthur Tracy, one-shot space alien characters	Willard Bowsky; Ugo D'Orsi	February 23, 1933	
72	Aloha Oe	Royal Samoans, one-shot jungle animal characters	Bernie Wolf; Dave Tendlar	March 17, 1933	
73	Popular Melodies	Art Jarrett	Willard Bowsky; Myron Waldman	April 7, 1933	
74	The Peanut Vendor	Armida, one-shot animal characters	Seymour Kneitel; Tom Johnson	April 28, 1933	
75	Song Shopping	Ethel Merman and Johnny Green, one-shot animal characters	Willard Bowsky; Dave Tendlar	May 19, 1933	
76	Boilesk	The Watson Sisters, one-shot animal characters	Willard Bowsky; Myron Waldman	June 9, 1933	
77	Sing, Sisters, Sing	Three X Sisters, one-shot animal characters	Bernie Wolf; Dave Tendlar	June 3, 1933	
78	Down by the Old Mill Stream	The Eton Boys, one-shot animal characters	Willard Bowsky; William Sturm	July 21, 1933	
79	Stoopnocracy	Stoopnagle and Budd, one-shot animal characters	Seymour Kneitel; William Henning	August 18, 1933	
80	When Yuba Plays the Rumba on the Tuba	The Mills Brothers	Bernie Wolf; Tom Johnson	September 15, 1933	
81	Boo Boo Theme Song	The Funnyboners	Willard Bowsky; Myron Waldman	October 13, 1933	
82	I Like Mountain Music	The Eton Boys	Willard Bowsky; Myron Waldman	November 10, 1933	
83	Sing, Babies, Sing	Baby Rose Marie	Seymour Kneitel; Dave Tendlar	December 15, 1933	
=== 1934 ===
84	Keeps Rainin' All the Time	Gertrude Niesen	Seymour Kneitel; William Henning	January 12, 1934	
85	Let's All Sing Like the Birdies Sing	Les Reis and Artie Dunn, one-shot cat and bird characters	Myron Waldman; Tom Johnson	February 9, 1934	
86	Tune Up and Sing	Lanny Ross	Willard Bowsky; Dave Tendlar	March 9, 1934	
87	Lazy Bones	Borrah Minnevitch and His Harmonica Rascals	Willard Bowsky; Dave Tendlar	April 13, 1934	
88	This Little Piggie Went to Market	Singin' Sam	Hicks Lokey; Paul Fennell	May 25, 1934	
89	She Reminds Me of You	The Eton Boys	Willard Bowsky; William Sturm	June 22, 1934	
90	Love Thy Neighbor	Mary Small	Myron Waldman; Edward Nolan	July 20, 1934	
91	Let's Sing with Popeye	Billy Costello	Seymour Kneitel; Roland Crandall (archival)	1934	Produced for Saturday morning matinee "Popeye Club".
=== 1935 ===
92	I Wished on the Moon	Abe Lyman and his Orchestra, Wiffle Piffle	Tom Johnson	September 20, 1935	
93	It's Easy to Remember	Richard Himber and his Orchestra (vocal by Stuart Allen)	Tom Johnson	November 29, 1935	
=== 1936 ===
94	No Other One	Hal Kemp and His Orchestra (vocal by Skinnay Ennis), Wiffle Piffle	Tom Johnson	January 24, 1936	
95	I Feel Like a Feather in the Breeze	Jack Denny and his Orchestra, Wiffle Piffle	Tom Johnson; Harold Walker	March 27, 1936	
96	I Don't Want to Make History	Vincent Lopez and his Orchestra (vocal by Johnny Morris), Wiffle Piffle	Tom Johnson; Harold Walker	May 22, 1936	
97	The Hills of Old Wyomin'	The Westerners / Curt Massey	Tom Johnson; Harold Walker	July 31, 1936	
98	I Can't Escape from You	Joe Reichman and His Orchestra (vocal by Billie Bailey)	Tom Johnson; David Hoffman	September 25, 1936	
99	Talking Through My Heart	Dick Stabile and his Orchestra, Wiffle Piffle	Tom Johnson; Harold Walker	November 27, 1936	
=== 1937 ===
100	Never Should Have Told You	Nat Brandwynne and His Orchestra, Wiffle Piffle	Roland Crandall	January 29, 1937	
101	Twilight on the Trail	The Westerners / Louise Massey	Roland Crandall	March 26, 1937	
102	Please Keep Me in Your Dreams	Henry King (musician) and his Orchestra (vocal by Barbara Blake)	Roland Crandall	May 28, 1937	
103	You Came to My Rescue	Shep Fields and His Rippling Rhythm Orchestra	Roland Crandall	July 30, 1937	
104	Whispers in the Dark	Gus Arnheim and his Orchestra (vocal by June Robbins)	Roland Crandall	September 24, 1937	
105	Magic on Broadway	Jay Freeman and his Orchestra	Roland Crandall	November 26, 1937	
=== 1938 ===
106	You Took the Words Right Out of My Heart	Jerry Blaine and his Streamline Rhythm Orchestra (vocal by Phyllis Kenny)	Roland Crandall	January 28, 1938	
107	Thanks for the Memory	Bert Block and his Orchestra	Roland Crandall	March 25, 1938	
108	You Leave Me Breathless	Jimmy Dorsey and his Orchestra (vocal by Bob Eberly)	Roland Crandall	May 27, 1938	
109	Beside a Moonlit Stream	Frank Dailey and his Orchestra	Roland Crandall	July 29, 1938	

=== Famous Studios ===
"Start your day with a song and sing the whole day through. Even while you're busy working, do just like the birdies do! Though the day may be long, you never will go wrong. Off-key, on-key, any old key, just start your day with a song!"

— Opening to the Famous Studios Screen Song shorts.

For all the shorts, the musical arrangements were made by Winston Sharples.

No.	Film	Song	Director	Story	Animation	Scenics	Original release date	Video if in the public domain
110	The Circus Comes to Clown (Note: First Famous Studios Screen Song short.)	"The Man on the Flying Trapeze"	I. Sparber	Bill Turner; Larz Bourne	Tom Johnson; Frank Endres	Anton Loeb	December 26, 1947	
111	Base Brawl	"Take Me Out to the Ball Game"	Seymour Kneitel	Bill Turner; Larz Bourne	Dave Tendlar; Tom Golden	Robert Connavale	January 23, 1948	
112	Little Brown Jug	"Little Brown Jug"	Seymour Kneitel	Bill Turner; Larry Riley	Orestes Calpini; Morey Reden; Bill Hudson	Tom Ford	February 20, 1948	
113	The Golden State	"California, Here I Come"	Seymour Kneitel	Larz Bourne; Larry Riley	Dave Tendlar; Bill Hudson	Robert Little	March 12, 1948	
114	Winter Draws On (Note: First two Screen Song shorts featuring Buzzy the Crow in the Paramount Picture series.)	"Alabamy Bound"	Seymour Kneitel	Larz Bourne; Bill Turner	Al Eugster; Irving Spector	Tom Ford	March 19, 1948	
115	Sing or Swim	"By the Beautiful Sea"	Seymour Kneitel	I. Klein; Larry Riley	Al Eugster; Irving Spector	Robert Connavale	June 16, 1948	
116	Camptown Races	"Camptown Races"	Seymour Kneitel	Bill Turner; Larry Riley	Al Eugster; Irving Spector	Tom Ford	July 30, 1948	
117	The Lone Star State	"Deep in the Heart of Texas"	I. Sparber	Larz Bourne	Dave Tendlar; Morey Reden	Robert Connavale	August 20, 1948	
118	Readin', 'Ritin' and Rhythmetic (Note: Previously lost; was later found and released on DVD and Blu-ray in 2026.)	"School Days"	Seymour Kneitel	I. Klein	Al Eugster; Bill Hudson	Tom Ford	October 22, 1948	
119	The Funshine State	"Tallahassee"	Seymour Kneitel	Larz Bourne	Dave Tendlar; Morey Reden	Shane Miller	January 7, 1949	
120	The Emerald Isle	"MacNamara's Band"	Seymour Kneitel	I. Klein	Al Eugster; Bill Hudson	Tom Ford; Robert Owen	February 25, 1949	
121	Comin' Round the Mountain	"She'll Be Comin' 'Round the Mountain"	I. Sparber	Bill Turner	Tom Johnson; Frank Endres	Anton Loeb	March 11, 1949	
122	The Stork Market	"Pretty Baby"	Seymour Kneitel	Bill Turner; Larry Riley	Al Eugster; Wm. B. Pattengill	Shane Miller	April 8, 1949	
123	Spring Song	"Spring Song"	I. Sparber	I. Klein	Myron Waldman; Larry Silverman	Shane Miller	June 3, 1949	
124	The Ski's the Limit	"I Miss My Swiss, My Swiss Miss Misses Me"	I. Sparber	Bill Turner; Larry Riley	Dave Tendlar; Tom Golden	Robert Connavale	June 24, 1949	
125	Toys Will Be Toys	"Oh, You Beautiful Doll"	Seymour Kneitel	I. Klein	Myron Waldman; Gordon Whittier	Robert Little	July 29, 1949	
126	Farm Foolery (Note: Only Screen Song short with only a picture cameo appearance of Little Audrey.)	"Shine On, Harvest Moon"	Seymour Kneitel	Larz Bourne	Al Eugster; Bill Hudson	Tom Ford	August 5, 1949	
127	Our Funny Finny Friends (Note: Only Screen Song short featuring the fishes from McElligot's Pool, based on the book by Dr. Seuss in the Paramount Picture series.)	"Three Little Fishies"	Seymour Kneitel	Larz Bourne; Larry Riley	Al Eugster; Bill Hudson	Tom Ford	August 26, 1949	
128	Marriage Wows	"For Me and My Gal"	I. Sparber	Bill Turner; Larry Riley	Myron Waldman; Gordon Whittier	Tom Ford	September 16, 1949	
129	The Big Flame Up (Note: Only Screen Song short featuring Tim Turtle in the Paramount Picture series.)	"There'll Be a Hot Time in the Old Town Tonight"	I. Sparber	I. Klein	Dave Tendlar; Martin Taras	Tom Ford	September 30, 1949	
130	Strolling Thru the Park	"Strolling Thru the Park"	Seymour Kneitel	I. Klein	Myron Waldman; Larry Silverman	Robert Little	November 4, 1949	
131	The Big Drip	"It Ain't Gonna Rain No Mo'"	I. Sparber	Larz Bourne; Larry Riley	Myron Waldman; Nick Tafuri	Tom Ford	November 25, 1949	
132	Snow Foolin'	"Jingle Bells"	I. Sparber	I. Klein	Myron Waldman; Gordon Whittier	Tom Ford	December 16, 1949	
133	Blue Hawaii	"Blue Hawaii"	Seymour Kneitel	Larz Bourne	Al Eugster; Wm. B. Pattengill	Lloyd Hallock Jr.	January 13, 1950	
134	Detouring Thru Maine	"The Maine Stein Song"	Seymour Kneitel	Larz Bourne	Al Eugster; Bill Hudson	Robert Connavale	February 17, 1950	
135	Short'nin' Bread	"Shortenin' Bread"	I. Sparber	Larz Bourne; Larry Riley	Myron Waldman; Gordon Whittier	Anton Loeb	March 24, 1950	
136	Win, Place and Show Boat	"Waiting for the Robert E. Lee"	I. Sparber	Larz Bourne; Larry Riley	Al Eugster; Wm. B. Pattengill	Robert Connavale	April 28, 1950	
137	Jingle Jangle Jungle	"Civilization (Bongo Bongo Bongo)"	Seymour Kneitel	Joe Stultz; Larry Riley	Myron Waldman; Larry Silverman	Tom Ford	May 19, 1950	
138	Heap Hep Injuns	"My Pony Boy"	I. Sparber	Larz Bourne	Tom Johnson; George Rufle	Anton Loeb	June 30, 1950	
139	Gobs of Fun (Note: Only Screen Song short featuring Herman in the Paramount Picture series.)	"Strike Up the Band (Here Comes a Sailor)"	I. Sparber	Larry Riley; Joe Stultz	Al Eugster; Irving Spector	Robert Owen	July 28, 1950	
140	Helter Swelter	"In the Good Old Summer Time"	Seymour Kneitel	Larz Bourne; Larry Riley	Al Eugster; Wm. B. Pattengill	Tom Ford	August 25, 1950	
141	Boos in the Nite (Note: Only Screen Song short featuring the ghosts from Casper the Friendly Ghost in the Paramount Picture series.)	"Pack Up Your Troubles"	I. Sparber	Joe Stultz; Larry Riley	Myron Waldman; Nick Tafuri	Anton Loeb	September 22, 1950	
142	Fiesta Time (Note: First Harveytoon short in the Paramount Picture series and first Screen Song/Harveytoon short reissued by Harvey Films.)	"El Rancho Grande"	Seymour Kneitel	I. Klein	Myron Waldman; Larry Silverman	Anton Loeb	October 20, 1950	
143	Fresh Yeggs (Note: Only Screen Song/Harveytoon and Harveytoon short featuring Wolfie in the Paramount Picture series.)	"Give My Regards to Broadway"	Seymour Kneitel	Larz Bourne	Myron Waldman; Nick Tafuri	Robert Owen	November 17, 1950	
144	Tweet Music (Note: Only Screen Song/Harveytoon and Harveytoon short featuring Inchy in the Paramount Picture series.)	"Let's All Sing Like the Birdies Sing"	I. Sparber	Joe Stultz	Al Eugster; George Rufle	Robert Owen	February 9, 1951	
145	Drippy Mississippi	"M-I-S-S-I-S-S-I-P-P-I"	Seymour Kneitel	Larz Bourne	Myron Waldman; Gordon Whittier	Anton Loeb	April 13, 1951	
146	Miners Forty-Niners	"Clementine"	I. Sparber	I. Klein	Myron Waldman; Larry Silverman	Anton Loeb	May 18, 1951	
147	Sing Again of Michigan (Note: Final Screen Song short featuring Buzzy the Crow in the Paramount Picture series and third Harveytoon short featuring him in it. Also final Screen Song short and the final Screen Song short reissued by Harvey Films.)	"I Want to Go Back to Michigan Down on the Farm"	I. Sparber	Larz Bourne	Al Eugster; George Rufle	Robert Owen	June 29, 1951	

== See also ==
- Bouncing ball (music)
- The Golden Age of American animation
- Kartunes
