= Rudy Vallee Melodies =

1932 short film

- Directed by: Dave Fleischer
- Starring: Margie Hines; Rudy Vallee as himself
- Production company: Fleischer Studios
- Distributed by: Paramount Pictures
- Release date: 5 August 1932 (United States)
- Running time: 11 minutes
- Country: United States
- Language: English

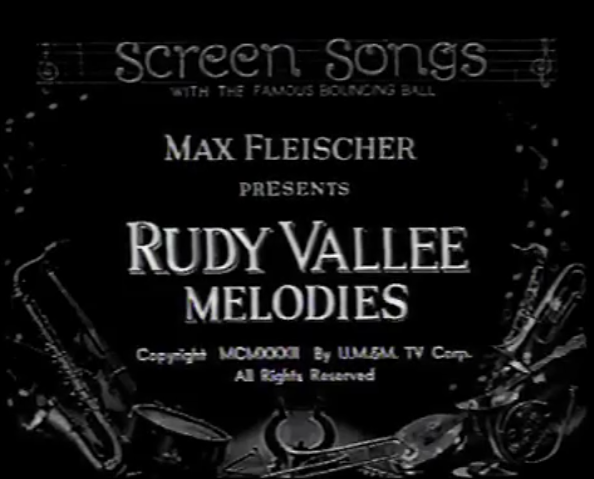
The title card of Rudy Vallee Melodies

Rudy Vallee Melodies is a 1932 short film which is presented by Max Fleischer and was originally released by Paramount Pictures. The film, which features Betty Boop with a plethora of animals as she throws a house party in her house, stars Rudy Vallee as he sings three separate songs. The film also features sing-along versions to the songs that Vallee sings.

The songs that Vallee sings during the film are: "Deep Night", "A Little Kiss Every Morning" and Vallee's "Stein Song".

Released on August 5, 1932, the film is part of the "follow the bouncing ball" series entitled Screen Songs. In these films, the audience would be invited to sing the songs featured in the film.

== Plot ==
"Stein Song", with accompanying footage of American football

The film begins at Betty Boop's house, as she throws a house party. She is seen in a room serving a drink to the other animals. Due to the drink, an argument breaks out between two animals, whom ultimately agree at the end to toss a coin. However, when one of the animals flips a coin, it comically ends up sideways. So one of the animals flips again, but flips it so high that a bird comically catches it and takes it. After that, Betty then asks for anyone that can sing and dance. A rabbit then comes forward and says that he can play the piano. So, Betty asks Hanson to bring in the piano. However Hanson is a small bug, so comically has to tug at it to get it in the room, whilst a big hippo comically only carries a stool. Betty then hands the rabbit some sheet music, but the rabbit says that he only plays "by ear". However, when he starts to play, he comically uses his ears to play the piano. Betty then requests for a singer whilst she plays. All of the animals decline her request. Until a picture of Rudy Vallee from a book of sheet music comes to life and says he will sing. Betty then asks Vallee is the songs will be old or new, Vallee then says that he'll sing songs that they will all know; and he'll sing them with the bouncing ball. His first song that he sings is "Deep Night", with footage of beaches and rainforests accompanying the song . The second song that he sings is "A Little Kiss Every Morning", with footage of a painting firstly showcasing multiple species of birds kissing, then transitioning to babies and their mothers, then to young couples, and then to elderly couples. The final song that Vallee sings is "Stein Song", a college song, with accompanying footage showcasing a noisy game of American football. After the three songs, the party concludes, and all the guests depart from Betty's house. Betty then wishes Vallee good night. Vallee, who is in a picture frame, begins to sing "Good Night Sweetheart". After that performance, Betty then laughs and wishes him a good night. The film ends with Vallee singing "Keep a Little Song Handy".

== Characters ==
In this film, there are a variety of characters. One of these characters is Betty Boop, whose house is the scene of the party which takes place during the film. These are also a variety of species of animals which are also featured in the film. The film, also includes Rudy Vallee, who sings the three songs during the bouncing ball sequences.

== Reception ==
Rudy Vallee Melodies received positive reviews from the cinema magazines at that time. The Film Daily said that the film was "Swell", and also said that the film was "A swell piece of entertainment". Whilst Variety said that the film was a "Novel kink", and also said that Vallee's singing "helped this film over nicely". And, The Motion Picture Herald said that the idea of combining Betty Boop and Rudy Vallee is "quite an idea", and also said that the film was "Pleasing entertainment, for young and old".
