= The Stein Song (film) =

1930 animated film

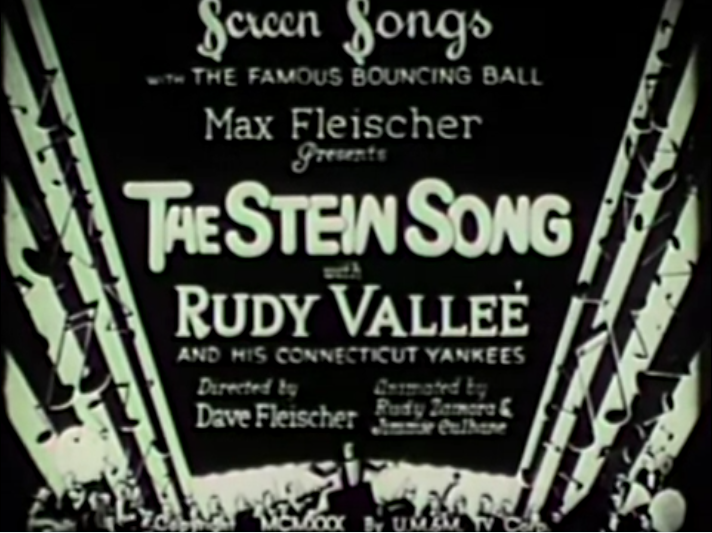
The title card of The Stein Song.

The Stein Song is a 1930 animated short film which is presented by Max Fleischer and was directed by Dave Fleischer. The film, which was animated by Rudy Zamora and Jimmie Culhane, features a sing-along version to "The Stein Song", which was written by Lincoln Colcord and was originally published in 1910. The song is also the school song for the University of Maine.

The film also features a cameo of Rudy Vallee, who is featured half-way through the film, inviting the audience to also sing-along to the song.

Copyrighted on September 5, 1930 and released on the same day, the film is part of the "follow the bouncing ball" series entitled Screen Songs. These films would instruct the audience to sing the title-song.

== Plot ==
The film

The film begins with a game of American football between Maine and Rutgers. Both sides begin to approach each other whilst they are both cheered on by their respective fans. Rutgers kick the ball first, which lands on a Maine player's head, whilst he is trying to catch it. Once the Maine player realises, he attempts to run across the field. Whilst he is doing this, the other team's players stop him by flinging themselves at the player. However, when the other team plays, the Maine player is comically found morphed in the ball. So, once the ball is on the ground, the Maine player (who was still in the ball) kicks the ball over and into the goal, scoring a goal for the Maine's. The ball then transitions into the bouncing ball used in the sing-along sequence.

The narrator (Billy Murray) then talks about The Stein Song, and about the song's rhythm. After the explanation, he then introduces Rudy Vallee.

Rudy Vallee then greets the audience and then invites the audience to sing-along to the "Stein Song" and to also follow the bouncing ball. Then, the song commences, sung by Rudy Vallee. In the second half of the film, multiple animals with flags of their universities begin to sing-along with Vallee, doing a verse each. After that, a Maine supporter begins to jump on the lyrics and begin to act like the bouncing ball. The lyrics lead him to a canoe with other mice. He commands the canoe until one of the rowers picks up a boot with his paddle and breaks the boat. The mouse then start to chant in the water. This makes the fish comically joining in their chanting. They both do this until the mice jump out of the water and the fish eat them. The film ends with the fish clapping.

== Characters ==
In the film, there are a variety of characters (all voiced by Billy Murray). The main characters are the two teams who play American football during the first half of the film. There are also the supporters of both teams, who come in a plethora of species. There is also the cameo of Rudy Vallee, who invites the audience to sing-along during the song section.

== Reception ==
The Stein Song was well received by the cinema magazines at the time. The Film Daily said that the film was "snappy as well as tuneful" and also said that Fleischer did "an excellent job with the cartoon work and the bouncing ball windup". The Motion Picture News said that the film was a "laugh riot".
