= Time on My Hands (film) =

1932 film

- Directed by: Dave Fleischer
- Produced by: Max Fleischer (producer)
- Starring: Ethel Merman; Mae Questel (uncredited)
- Color process: Black-and-white
- Production company: Fleischer Studios
- Distributed by: Paramount Pictures
- Release date: 1932
- Running time: 9 minutes
- Language: English

Time On My Hands is a 1932 American Screen Songs animated short, produced by Fleischer Studios and directed by Dave Fleischer. The song featured in this Screen Song, "Time on My Hands", was a popular song which was published in 1930.

== Summary ==
A fisherman deals with rebellious worms, a diver flirts with a Betty Boop-like mermaid who becomes Ethel Merman, singing the title song in live-action followed by the Bouncing Ball.
