= Kitty from Kansas City (film) =

1931 animated film

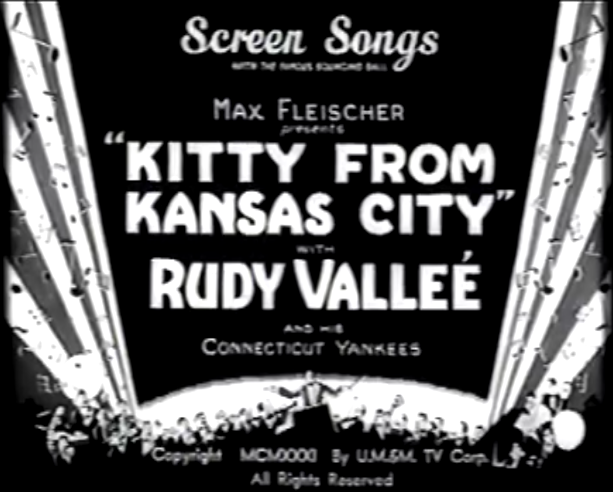
- The title card of Kitty from Kansas City.
- Directed by: Dave Fleischer
- Produced by: Max Fleischer
- Starring: Rudy Vallée; Mae Questel
- Music by: Lou Fleischer
- Production company: Fleischer Studios
- Distributed by: Paramount Pictures
- Release date: November 1, 1931 (United States)
- Running time: 8 minutes
- Country: United States
- Language: English

Kitty from Kansas City is a 1931 animated short film which is presented by Max Fleischer and was originally released by Paramount Pictures. The film, with features Betty Boop as she attempts to comically get to Rudy Valley, features a sing-along of the song "Kitty from Kansas City", a song that Vallee released on vinyl via the Victor record label.

Hence the name of Betty Boop's destination; it features a cameo of Rudy Vallee, who is featured half-way through the film. He invites the audience, via disguise, to sing-along to the title song.

The song which is sung during the film is about a woman who is called Kitty. The song discusses that she was unintelligent and was also unattractive, but is still loved nonetheless.

Copyrighted on November 3, 1931, and released 2 days prior, the film is part of the "follow the bouncing ball" series of films entitled Screen Songs. These sets of films would invite the audience to sing along to a selected song.

== Plot ==
The film begins with Betty Boop walking to the train station, with her cat, parrot and her suitcase. After descending onto the station, she asks a railroad worker about the distance between her current location and to 'Rudy Valley'. He informs her that the train will be arriving soon at the station. Whilst waiting for the train, the parrot bits Betty in the buttocks whilst she is turned away. She blames the railroad worker and strikes him in the face. After that, Betty is caught on a hook by an oncoming train. The train takes her to 'Rudy Valley', where she had intended on going. Once the train stops, Betty then hears some singing, and states on how that is Vallee. The film then transitions to a man with a mustache singing and smoking a cigar. The man then breaks the fourth wall, by asking the audience if they would be interested in hearing a song about his old girlfriend, whose name was Kitty. The bouncing ball then appears, which the man tips his hat to. The ball comically tips him back. The man then asks for the audience to get ready for the song, as it is about to start. Then the song commences, with the man singing it. During the song, the man gives examples about Kitty's unintelligence; such as Kitty thinking that Mussolini (then fascist leader of Italy) was an exercise, another example was she thinking that No man's land (a section of battlefield unoccupied during a war) was an old maid's room, and also thinking that Rudy Valley, was a place between two hills. Then, the man takes off his fake mustache, and it is discovered that the man is Rudy Vallee. Vallee then tips his hat to the audience. In the next section of the film, Kitty, who is still portrayed by Betty Boop, perform actions according to the lyrics, such as weighing herself during the lyric about her weight, and drinking in excessive amounts during the lyric about her gaining weight. She also comically gets the order of food utensils wrong, by putting a block of ice into the oven and putting coal in the fridge. In the final section of the film, Kitty attempts to mount on a horse, but she fails, as her weight tires the horse. Kitty agrees to comically be the horse and carry the actual horse, for which the actual horse agrees. However, she carrying the horse makes the horse obese. So, the horse carries Kitty from then on. Their journey leads them to the sea, where Kitty is thrown into by the horse. After that, Kitty then tries to swim back up multiple times, but the waves drag her back every time. However, Kitty comically finds a plug and pulls it out, which comically drains the entire ocean. The film ends with a parade featuring Kitty and several sea animals.

== Characters ==
In the film, there are a variety of characters. The main characters is Kitty, who is portrayed by Betty Boop. She attempts to go to 'Rudy Valley', which is a pun on Rudy Vallee, who (according to the song) was Kitty's former boyfriend. There are Kitty's animals, both a cat and a parrot. Kitty attempts to take them both to a train to her intended destination, but fails, as she is caught on a hook from another train. The film also features a cameo from Rudy Vallee, who is originally portrayed in a disguise. He reveals his true identity near the end of the song.

== Reception ==
Kitty from Kansas City received mixed reviews from the cinema magazines at that time. Whilst The Film Daily said that the film was a "clever combination" of animation and song. Variety said that the film had "too much of a buildup for a tune made popular some time back by Rudy Vallee". The magazine also stated that the "accompanying cartoon footage is not enough" to save the film.
