= Mother, Mother, Mother Pin a Rose on Me =

1925 film

- Directed by: Dave Fleischer
- Produced by: Max Fleischer
- Music by: song "Mother, Pin a Rose on Me"
- Production companies: Out of the Inkwell Studios (National Amusements)
- Distributed by: Red Seal Pictures
- Release date: March 1, 1925
- Country: United States
- Language: English

Mother, Mother, Mother Pin a Rose on Me is a film, produced by Out of the Inkwell Studios in the Phonofilm sound-on-film system, and released on March 1, 1925, as part of the Song Car-Tunes series.

Max Fleischer, Lee de Forest, Hugo Riesenfeld, and Edwin Miles Fadiman formed Red Seal Pictures to release the Song Car-Tunes series.

Early titles in the Song Car-Tunes series were Oh Mabel, Come Take A Trip in My Airship, and Goodbye My Lady Love, all released in May and June 1924. They were the first sound cartoons, (predating Disney's Steamboat Willie (1928)). The Song Car-Tunes series eventually totaled 36 films, including 21 made in the Phonofilm sound system.

"Mother, Mother, Mother Pin a Rose on Me" is a popular song from 1905. The Fleischers re-released this film on July 6, 1929, as simply Mother, Pin a Rose on Me, part of their Screen Songs series, made in Western Electric, and released through Paramount Pictures.
