= Tramp, Tramp, Tramp (disambiguation) =

Tramp, Tramp, Tramp and variations may refer to:

- "Tramp! Tramp! Tramp!", American Civil War song
- Tramp, Tramp, Tramp, 1926 American silent comedy film
- Tramp, Tramp, Tramp (1942 film), American comedy
- Tramp, Tramp, Tramp, the Boys Are Marching (1926 film), short animation film
- "Tramp, Tramp, Tramp", song from Victor Herbert's 1910 operetta Naughty Marietta
