= Song Car-Tunes =

Animated film series

Ko-Ko Song Car-Tunes, Song Car-Tunes, or (as some sources erroneously say) Sound Car-Tunes, is a series of short three-minute animated films produced by Max Fleischer and Dave Fleischer between May 1924 and September 1927, pioneering the use of the "Follow the Bouncing Ball" device used to lead audiences in theater sing-alongs. The Song Car-Tunes also pioneered the application of sound film to animation.

== History ==
47 Song Car-tunes were produced and released between 1924 and 1927. The first, Come Take a Trip on My Airship, was released on March 9, 1924. Beginning in 1925, an estimated 16 Song Car-tunes were produced using the Phonofilm sound-on-film process developed by Lee DeForest. The remaining 31 titles were released silent, designed to be played with live music in theaters.

The Fleischer brothers partnered with DeForest, Edwin Miles Fadiman, and Dr. Hugo Riesenfeld to form Red Seal Pictures Corporation, which owned 36 theaters on the East Coast of the U.S., extending as far west as Cleveland, Ohio. In September 1926, the U.S. division of DeForest Phonofilm and Red Seal Pictures Corporation filed for bankruptcy, and the Fleischers ended their use of the Phonofilm system, releasing their last sound Song Car-Tune, By the Light of the Silvery Moon (1927), just as the sound era was about to begin. In early 1929, the Fleischers signed a Paramount Pictures contract. Former Fleischer partner, Alfred Weiss re-released some of the silent Song Car-Tunes between 1929 and 1932 with new soundtracks, new animation, and new main titles that exploited the reputation of the popular song films with the elimination of the names of Max and Dave Fleischer.

With the sound era established, the Fleischers revived the song film series as Screen Songs in February 1929 on the strength of being the holders of the original Patent on the concept. Though Ko-Ko the Clown had been temporarily retired due to complications with the dissolution of the original Inkwell Studios, the "Bouncing Ball" was retained. This new series ran a full seven minutes, with more animation than the early Song Car-Tunes, built around the theme of the featured song.

The first films in the new series used standards such as The Sidewalks of New York (released on 5 February 1929) and Old Black Joe. The series continued with new productions of songs previously released in the earlier series, such as Daisy Bell, Good Bye, My Lady Love, Mother Pin a Rose On Me, Oh! How I Hate to Get Up in the Morning, and Come Take a Trip in My Airship, released by Paramount Pictures for nine years.

Many of the Screen Songs featured popular stars of stage, radio, and records such as Ethel Merman, Rudy Vallee, Lillian Roth, The Mills Brothers, and the Boswell Sisters. Starting in 1934, the Screen Songs series focused on the big bands of the "Swing Era", such as Abe Lyman, Shep Fields, Gus Arnheim, Hal Kemp, Jack Denny, Vincent Lopez, Henry King, Jay Freeman, Jerry Baline, Bert Block, Frank Dailey, and Jimmy Dorsey.

The "Screen Songs" concept was revised in a special edition of the Technicolor Noveltoons series in 1945 with When G. I. Johnny Comes Home Again, and the series officially returned in 1947 with The Circus Comes to Clown and continued until 1951. Paramount attempted to revive the series in 1963 after the television success of Sing Along With Mitch with the cartoon Hobo's Holiday.

The concept of the "Bouncing Ball" has become such an established cultural icon, that it has been used in television commercials to sell all sorts of products from sleeping tablets to cat food. Just before retiring in 1968, Dave Fleischer used a form of the "Bouncing Ball" for the ending of Thoroughly Modern Millie where he shot cutout animation to "bounce" the head of Beatrice Lillie over the lyrics to the title song.

== List of Song Car-Tunes ==
Screen Songs for sound reissues in Cinephone were released independently by Alfred Weiss.

1924

- Come Take a Trip in My Airship (March 9, 1924) (silent; sound re-issue)
- Goodbye My Lady Love (March 9, 1924) (sound)
- Oh Mabel (May 1924) (sound)

1925

- The Old Folks at Home (February 1, 1925)
- The Sidewalks of New York (May 1925) (sound)
- Daisy Bell (May 30, 1925) (sound)
- Swanee River (July 15, 1925)
- My Bonnie Lies over the Ocean (September 15, 1925)
- Ta-Ra-Ra-Boom-Dee-Aye (October 15, 1925)
- Dixie (November 15, 1925)
- Sailing Sailing Over the Bounding Main (November 15, 1925)
- Oh Suzanna (1925)
- Old Pal (Dear Old Pal) (1925) (sound)

1926

- I Love a Lassie (January 15, 1926)
- When I Leave This World Behind (January 30, 1926)
- Darling Nelly Gray (February 16, 1926) (sound)
- Has Anybody Here Seen Kelly? (February 21, 1926) (sound)
- My Old Kentucky Home (March 13, 1926) (sound)
- Sweet Adeline (May 1, 1926) (sound)
- Tramp, Tramp, Tramp, the Boys Are Marching (May 8, 1926) (silent; sound re-issue)
- Toot Toot Tootsie (June 5, 1926)
- Trail of the Lonesome Pine (July 17, 1926)
- In the Good Old Summertime (August 1926)
- Alexander’s Ragtime Band (September 1, 1926) (silent; sound re-issue)
- The Sheik of Araby (September 15, 1926) (sound)
- Coming Through the Rye (September 19, 1926) (sound)
- Annie Laurie (September 30, 1926) (sound)
- Oh! How I Hate to Get Up in the Morning (October 1, 1926) (sound)
- When I Lost You (October 15, 1926) (sound)
- Margie (October 30, 1926) (sound)
- Old Black Joe (November 1, 1926) (sound)
- When the Midnight Choo-Choo Leaves for Alabam' (November 1, 1926) (sound)
- Mother, Mother, Mother Pin a Rose on Me (December 1, 1926) (sound)
- Pack Up Your Troubles (December 15, 1926) (sound)
- Yak-A-Doola-Hick-A-Doola (December 15, 1926) (sound)
- My Wife's Gone to the Country (December 30, 1926) (sound)

1927

- By the Light of the Silvery Moon (January 1, 1927) (sound)
- Waiting for the Robert E. Lee (April 15, 1927)

1929

- Down In Jungle Town (1929) (sound)
- Summer Harmonies (1929) (sound)

== See also ==
- History of animation
- Sound film
- Phonofilm
- RCA Photophone

== Sources ==
- Leonard Maltin, Of Mice and Magic: A History of the American Animated Film (1980, revised 1987)
- Richard Fleischer, Out of the Inkwell: Max Fleischer and the Animation Revolution (2005)
- Ray Pointer, Max Fleischer's Ko-Ko Song Car-tunes (with the Famous Bouncing Ball) DVD (2002)
