= Chinatown, My Chinatown (film) =

1929 animated film

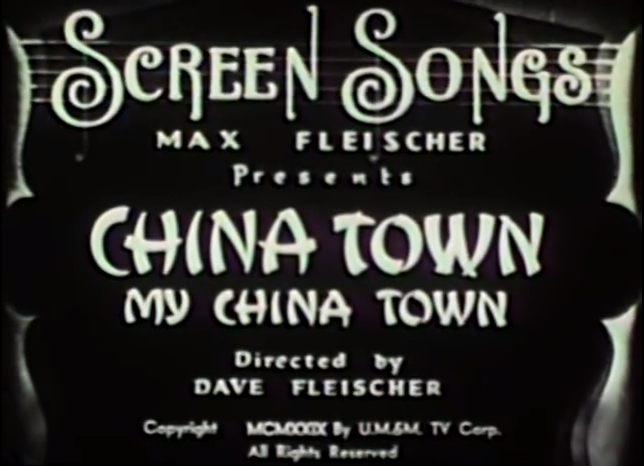
- The title card of Chinatown, My Chinatown
- Directed by: Dave Fleischer
- Production company: Red Seal Pictures Corporation
- Distributed by: Paramount
- Release date: August 29, 1929
- Country: United States
- Language: English

Chinatown, My Chinatown is a 1929 animated short film which was presented by Max Fleischer and directed by Dave Fleischer. The film, which was originally released by Paramount, features a sing-along version of the song "Chinatown, My Chinatown", a song that was originally published in 1910.

The film also features Chinese caricatures, whose doings are stereotypical Chinese, such as eating Chinese food and ironing a shirt, as it was common for laundromats to be run by Chinese immigrants at that time.

Copyrighted on August 2, 1929 and released on the 29nd, the film is part of "follow the bouncing ball" series entitled Screen Songs. These films would instruct the audience to sing that said-song.

== Plot ==
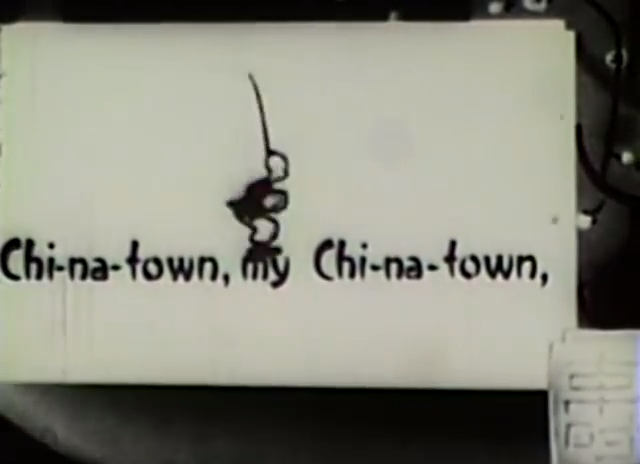
A Chinese caricature jumping on the lyrics and acting as the bouncing ball.

The film opens, with stereotypical Chinese music, to two Chinese caricatures. One of them is eating Chinese food with chopsticks, the other one is ironing a shirt next to him. Then, the ironer, whilst trying to test the heat of the iron, drops the shirt into the eater's bowl. The eater then comically eats the shirt. Once the ironer notices the shirt's disappearance and investigates the eater about it, he spits out a button. This angers the ironer, who pings it at the eater's face. This also angers the eater, who hits his chopsticks at the ironer's head. This starts a fight between the two of them, with both of them comically using their pointy hats as swords. This ends with the eater's hat being damaged, but this does not stop him for stabbing the ironer in the buttocks. This makes the ironer cry out a Chinese letter, which morphs into the bouncing ball, used in the Screen Songs to help the audience keep up with the song. An unnamed man invites the audience, through broken English and a Chinese accent, to sing-along and follow the bouncing ball. However, he comically warns the audience that if they do not sing, then they will not wash their clothes. The song sung is "Chinatown, My Chinatown", which is played with Chinese instruments, such as a gong which is struck several times during the song. There are also animated footage where other caricatures perform actions according to the lyrics which are played during the song. The last section of the song features a Chinese man in place of the bouncing ball, by jumping on the lyrics. The lyrics comically lead him to his clothes-line, and the film ends with him drawing his clothes-line to his house.

== Characters ==
The Full film.

In the film, there are numerous Chinese caricatures. The main two, which is featured in the first half of the film, speak nonsense words, which is meant to parody Mandarin, and they also fight near the end of the first half. The other caricatures, who are featured in the second half of the film, or the sing-along section, perform actions according to the lyrics, and also attempt to attack the person who is acting as the bouncing ball near the end of the film.

== Reception ==
Chinatown, My Chinatown was well received by The Film Daily. Reviewed as Chinatown, the magazine said the film was a "corking piece of entertainment" and also said the film was "Great fun".
