= Henry Rose =

Henry Rose may refer to:

- Henry H. Rose (1856–1923), mayor of Los Angeles
- Henry Rose (cricketer) (1853–1895), New Zealand cricketer
- Henry Rose (priest) (1800–1873), English churchman, theologian and scholar
- Henry Rose (MP) (fl. 1406), Member of Parliament for Guildford, England
- Henry Rose (Irish politician) (1675–1743), Irish politician and judge

== See also ==
- Harry Rose (disambiguation)
