= Crosby, Columbo, and Vallee =

1932 film

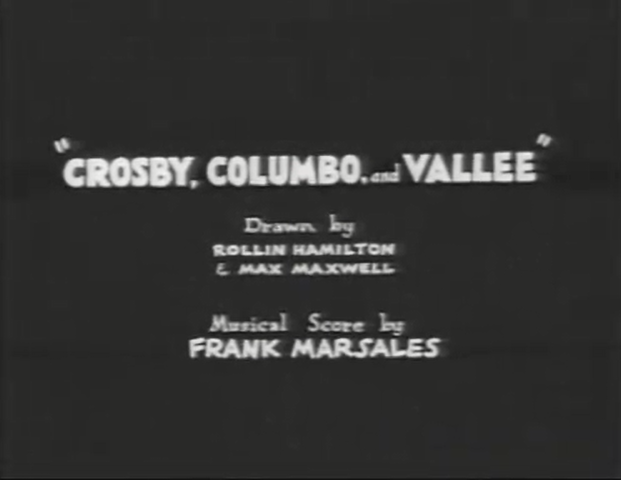
- Title card
- Directed by: Rudolf Ising
- Produced by: Hugh Harman; Rudolf Ising; Leon Schlesinger
- Starring: The King's Men; Johnny Murray
- Music by: Frank Marsales
- Animation by: Rollin Hamilton; Max Maxwell
- Color process: Black and white
- Production companies: Harman-Ising Productions; Leon Schlesinger Productions
- Distributed by: Warner Bros. Pictures; The Vitaphone Corporation
- Release date: March 19, 1932
- Running time: 7 min (one reel)
- Country: United States
- Language: English

Crosby, Columbo, and Vallee is a 1932 American animated comedy short film directed by Rudolf Ising. It is the ninth film in the Merrie Melodies series, featuring the titular song by Dick Robertson. It was released on March 19, 1932.

== Title song ==
The title song had been recorded by Dick Robertson in 1931 (Perfect 12772B) and called upon men to fight "these public enemies" brought into homes via radio.

== Plot ==
Full short

A tribe of American Indians sing the titular song, cursing the crooners Bing Crosby, Russ Columbo, and Rudy Vallée for stealing their [sic] squaws. One of them, a young boy, canoes through waterfalls to meet his girlfriend. He gives her an umbrella fashioned from a tree and starts a radio with a spider and its web as its antenna. They continue to sing the titular song while other animals join in, while a dog sings "This Is My Love Song". Some more tribesmen join in and dance with them. Unfortunately, a nearby campfire is also moved by the singing and dancing, with little fire creatures dancing to the tune and unintentionally causing a wildfire. Three baby birds are trapped on a burning tree, with the boy rushing to the three with a spiderweb lifted by bees to rescue them. He is chased by the fire creatures, which light his pants on fire. The three birds land on the spiderweb, only to be burnt by the last fire creature, which the boy then extinguishes with his saliva.

== Reception ==
The Film Daily called it "A lively cartoon...Makes a tuneful number, with the usual animated antics." The Motion Picture Herald said: "Amusing, especially for the younger element..."
