= Harry Rose (vaudevillian) =

American vaudeville comedian, singer and songwriter (c. 1893–1962)

Harry Rose (July 13, 1893 – December 10, 1962) was an American vaudeville comedian, singer and songwriter.

There is some uncertainty over his origins. Anthony Slide's The Encyclopedia of Vaudeville states that he was born in Leeds, England, on December 2, 1893, moving to Milwaukee as a child in 1905; but official records and a newspaper obituary give his birth name as Henry Arthur Rosenthal, born in Milwaukee on July 13, 1892. Rose claimed to be a nephew of the vaudeville comedian Joe Weber.

He made his stage debut as a comedian and singer in Milwaukee in 1910, and then served in the military in France during the First World War. After his return he became established on Broadway in shows such as George White's Scandals (1921), The O'Brien Girl (1921), and The Merry Malones (1927). He was a popular master of ceremonies, known as "The Broadway Jester". According to Slide, Rose "was a comedian who worked in the same somewhat effeminate style of Jack Benny and Lou Holtz." In 1929 he appeared in the early talkie short, Metro Movietone Revue, performing the risqué novelty song "Frankfurter Sandwiches".

Rose was also a lyricist, his most successful song being "Kitty from Kansas City", recorded by Rudy Vallée. In World War II he served in entertainment divisions, before making cameo movie appearances in such films as An Angel Comes to Brooklyn (1945), Varieties on Parade (1951), and Naughty New Orleans (1954).

Rose was a board member of the American Guild of Vaudeville Artists. He died in Los Angeles in 1962.
