= I'm Afraid to Go Home in the Dark =

1930 film

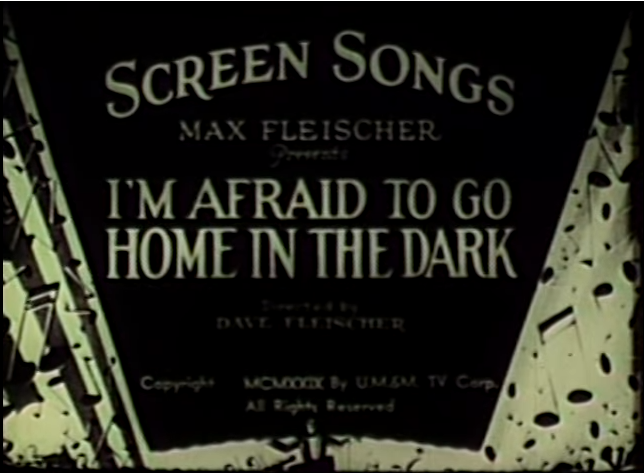
The title card of I'm Afraid To Go Home in the Dark.

I'm Afraid to Go Home in the Dark is a 1930 animated short film which is presented by Max Fleischer and was directed by Dave Fleischer. The film, which was originally released by the film company Paramount Pictures, features a sing-along version of the song "I'm Afraid to Come Home in the Dark", which was written by Egbert Van Alstyne and Harry Williams and was originally published in 1907.

The film also features an early prototype of Bimbo, the same that was used in the Fleischer cartoon Hot Dog, which was released in the same year.

Copyright on January 30, 1930, and released the same day, the film is part of the "Follow the bouncing ball" series entitled Screen Songs. These films would invite the audience to sing the song featured in them.

== Plot ==
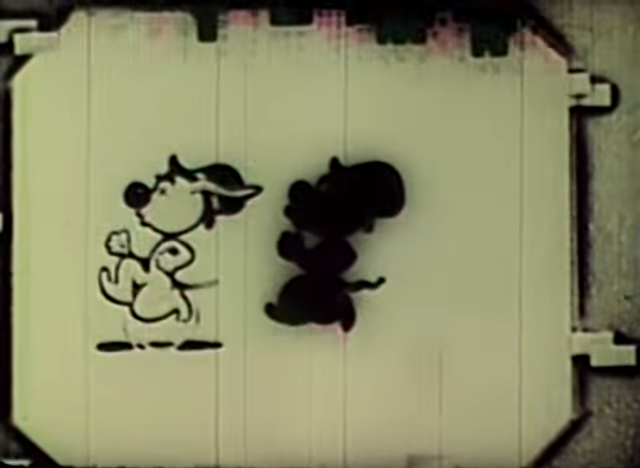
The title card of I'm Afraid To Go Home in the Dark.

The film begins with a set of two owls standing on a tree, one of them hooting. Then, a tower clock strikes 3am, with a chicken acting as the cuckoo. Bimbo is then seen leaving a bar. He then notices the owl's hoot and hides in front of the door. Bimbo then, with his legs shaking, tries to jog home whilst whistling the title song. However the owl hoots again and his jog turns into a run. The owl hoots for a third time and Bimbo's run turns into a fast gallop. Bimbo's shadow then comically morphs into a ghost. When Bimbo notices this, he comically hides under his hat, and begins to run in circles. Whilst under his hat, Bimbo attacks and tries to outrun the ghost. Until Bimbo comically hits the ghost on the head and it turns back into a shadow. However, the shadow is sticky, so Bimbo's feet, hands and nose are stuck. During an attempt to free himself. His nose comically falls off. The shadow, then turns back into a ghost and throws Bimbo's nose at Bimbo's face. His nose then becomes the bouncing ball, which is used during the song.

What follows is an unnamed poem which is read just before the song starts, recited by Billy Murray and James Stanley. The poem's subject is about skeletons and how to scare them. The poem runs thus:

When spirits squeak and inspectors creak;

And skeleton rowel and roam,

When gruesome hosts of spooks and ghosts;

Drop out of the ground and moan,

When the goblins out to get your skin;

And make it into a shroud,

The only way to scare 'em is to sing loud-and-loud!

[The] way to scare most anything is to sing out loud!

The song, which is "I'm Afraid to Come Home in the Dark" starts to plays (first verse sung by Billy Murray and second verse by Walter Van Brunt). The song is set to crude drawings which are according to the lyrics and are at the bottom of the screen. After some time, Bimbo reappears, with numerous dogs, and some beaters. He hits the dogs over the head with the beaters, mimicking a xylophone. After that, Bimbo then acts as the bouncing ball, and jumps on the lyrics. His doings at this section are according to the lyrics. His journey through the lyrics ends at his house. Bimbo tries multiple times to enter his property, but however multiple things like the stairs and the door comically move around, so that he cannot enter. The fight ends with the house comically dragging Bimbo inside. Bimbo then starts to yell outside his window. However, Bimbo and his house then comically morphs into a hot dog. The cartoon ends with the hot dog barking.

== Characters ==
In this film, an early prototype of Bimbo is featured as the main character. The same prototype is used on the animated film Hot Dog, which was released in 1930. Other characters include the two owls, whose hooting upsets and distresses Bimbo, and Bimbo's ghost, who Bimbo has a fight after attempting to run home from the bar.

== Reception ==
I'm Afraid To Go Home in the Dark was well received in the cinema magazines at that time. The Motion Picture News said that the film was "sure fire stuff", and also said the film was "Immensely clever". Whilst The Film Daily said that the film will "provide several minutes of entertainment for any class of folks" and also said the film was an "Amusing Sound Cartoon".
