= Tramp, Tramp, Tramp, the Boys Are Marching (1926 film) =

Tramp, Tramp, Tramp, The Boys are Marching
- Directed by: Dave Fleischer
- Produced by: Max Fleischer
- Music by: song "Tramp! Tramp! Tramp!" by George F. Root
- Production companies: Out of the Inkwell Studios (National Amusements)
- Distributed by: Red Seal Pictures (1926); Inkwell Studios (1929)
- Release date: May 8, 1926
- Country: United States
- Language: English

Tramp, Tramp, Tramp, the Boys Are Marching is a short animation film originally released on May 8, 1926, produced by Fleischer Studios as part of the Song Car-Tunes series. This cartoon features the original lyrics of "Tramp! Tramp! Tramp!" (1864) by George F. Root, but was later reissued by Alfred Weiss in 1928 or 1929 with new animation and sound and is in the series The Screen Tunes.
