= Darling Nelly Gray (film) =

1926 film

- The title card
- Directed by: Dave Fleischer
- Produced by: Max Fleischer
- Music by: song "Nelly Gray (song)" by Benjamin Hanby
- Production companies: Out of the Inkwell Studios (National Amusements)
- Distributed by: Red Seal Pictures
- Release date: February 16, 1926
- Running time: 5 minutes
- Country: United States
- Language: English

Darling Nelly Gray is a 1926 American animated short film, part of the Song Car-Tunes film series. It features the lyrics of "Darling Nelly Gray" (1856) by Benjamin Hanby, and was one of the 19 installments of the series to feature sound recorded in the Lee de Forest Phonofilm sound-on-film system.

== Plot ==
Ko-Ko the Clown jumps out of the ink bottle, goes on a theater stage and pulls the curtains. He changes his outfit, whistles for his quartet to come on stage, and writes on a chalkboard telling the audience to follow the bouncing ball and sing "Darling Nelly Gray".
