= Yankee Doodle Boy =

1929 film

- Directed by: Dave Fleischer
- Produced by: Max Fleischer
- Animation by: Seymour Kneitel
- Color process: Black and White
- Production company: Fleischer Studios
- Distributed by: Paramount Famous Lasky Corporation
- Release date: March 1, 1929
- Country: United States
- Language: English

Yankee Doodle Boy is a 1929 short film released by Paramount Famous Lasky Corporation and produced by Fleischer Studios. It was named after the song "The Yankee Doodle Boy" an equivalent to "Yankee Doodle" and was released in part of the Screen Songs.
