= Kitty from Kansas City =

1930 song popularised by Rudy Vallee

"Kitty from Kansas City" is a "comedy fox trot song" with lyrics by Harry Rose and music by Jesse Greer, popularized in 1930 by the singer Rudy Vallée.

Photos of sheet music, apparently from 1921, provide the names of Rose and Greer, as does a listing for Milt Coleman's 1930 recording. "New Arrangement" by Vallée and George Bronson appears just below the names of Rose and Greer on the 1931 sheet music. However, photos of the phonograph record, Victor 22419-A list "Rose-Branson-Vallée" as the authors.

The song is about a Midwestern girl called Kitty. Verses repeat the phrases, "She wasn't pretty", "She's so dumb", and "She wasn't hard to see; she weighed 243" as setups for punned gag lines. For example, "She's so dumb, her brain is in a whirl/Why, she thinks that Babe Ruth is a chorus girl!" Yet, the singer professes, he loves Kitty nonetheless.

The song was recorded by Vallée, the Imperial Dance Orchestra, Johnny Walker, and Milt Coleman.

In the 1931 animated short film Kitty from Kansas City, the cartoon character Betty Boop travels by train to Rudy Valley, where, in a live-action sequence, Rudy Vallée sings the song while a bouncing ball follows the lyrics on screen.
