= Oh Mabel =

1924 film

- Directed by: Dave Fleischer
- Produced by: Max Fleischer
- Music by: song "Oh, Mabel!" by Ted Fio Rito and Gus Kahn
- Production companies: Out of the Inkwell Studios (National Amusements)
- Distributed by: Red Seal Pictures
- Release date: May 1924 (United States)
- Country: United States
- Language: English

Oh Mabel is a 1924 American animated short film, part of the Song Car-Tunes film series. This film is the first sound film of the series, and used the Phonofilm sound-on-film system. The Song Car-Tunes series, before it ended in September 1926, eventually totaled 36 films, of which 19 were made with sound.

The Fleischer brothers, Lee de Forest, Hugo Riesenfeld, and Edwin Miles Fadiman formed Red Seal Pictures to release the Song Car-Tunes series.
