= The Maine Stein Song =

The Maine Stein Song is the school song of the University of Maine. Its lyrics were written by UMaine student Lincoln Colcord in 1904 and its tune was based on Opie, a march written by E. A. Fenstad. It was popularized in 1930 by Rudy Vallée and became the only college song to become a number one hit.

== Beginnings ==
In 1902, Adelbert W. Sprague, a sophomore at the University of Maine, discovered Opie, a march written by United States Army bandmaster E. A. Fenstad, while he was playing in an orchestra in Bar Harbor, Maine. In 1904, Sprague, then a senior and the school's band leader, was preparing for a concert to be held at the university. He handed part of Opie to his roommate, Lincoln Colcord, and asked him to provide some Maine-themed lyrics for the song. Colcord wrote the lyrics in half an hour and Sprague then rearranged the song slightly to fit the lyrics. The song was presented to the faculty advisor on music affairs, who disapproved of it on the grounds that it was a drinking song and it would be in poor taste for the state university of a state that prohibited the manufacture and sale of liquor to have its students singing such a song. However, Sprague had a chance meeting with University of Maine President George Emory Fellows, who told him that the lyrics were all right. The song was a hit at a concert and became popular with the student body.

The lyrics were first published on February 15, 1905 in the University of Maine student newspaper The Maine Campus. The song was copyrighted on June 23, 1910 by Carl Fisher, who owned the copyright to Opie, under the name "Opie" – The University of Maine Stein Song.

== Rudy Vallée ==
Rudy Vallée heard the Maine Stein Song when he attended the University of Maine from 1921 to 1922. In 1929, the National Broadcasting Company acquired the rights to Opie and Vallée, the host of the network's Fleischmann's Yeast Hour, recorded the song with a faster tempo and a few word changes. The song topped the charts for two months and was the leading song of 1930. It became the only college song to become a number one hit.

In 1953, Vallée sang the song before a live television audience of 60 million persons (broadcast live over the NBC and CBS networks) as part of The Ford 50th Anniversary Show.

== Reception ==
At the time the song became popular, its reference to drinking was said to be a violation of the Volstead Act. Its lyrics were also criticized for being pagan by proposing a toast "to the gods" and "to the fates". In 1930, Johnny Johnson and Harry McDaniel wrote I'd Like To Find The Guy Who Wrote The Stein Song, a comedy song about a man who is fed up with constantly hearing The Stein Song on the radio.

In the late 1980s and early 1990s, the song came under moralist fire again for its promotion of drinking and lyrics that were considered ‘sexist’ ("let every Maine man sing" and "to the lips and the eyes of the girls who will love us someday"). Various individuals began to push for a revision of the lyrics or the adoption of a new school song. These persons did not meet with success, the song remaining widely popular throughout the student body.

Bill Studwell ranked The Stein Song as the sixth best college fight song in his book College Fight Songs: An Annotated Anthology.
