= Bouncing ball (music) =

Visual indicator of the rhythm of a song

An example of the bouncing ball from Readin', 'Ritin', and Rhythmetic, a Paramount Screen Song.

The bouncing ball is a virtual device used in motion picture films and video recordings to visually indicate the rhythm of a song, helping audiences to sing along with live or prerecorded music. As the song's lyrics are displayed on the screen in a lower third of projected or character-generated text, an animated ball bounces across the top of the words, landing on each syllable when it is to be sung.

The bouncing ball is mainly used for English language songs in video recordings, however, in Japan, a similar device is used where the text changes color as it is sung, just like in karaoke.

== History ==
The Mills Brothers sing "I Ain't Got Nobody" with the bouncing ball in 1932

The bouncing ball technique was invented by Max Fleischer originally for the "Ko-Ko" Song Car-Tunes (1924–1927) and revised in 1929 as Screen Songs (1929–1938) for Paramount. It was introduced in March 1924 with the film Come Take a Trip in My Airship.

In early Song Car-Tunes such as "Margie" and Irving Berlin's "When the Midnight Choo-Choo Leaves for Alabam'" the ball is animated, looking like a beach ball clumsily hitting the words without precise timing. This awkwardness was eliminated by filming the ball live over printed lyrics, and the ball attached to a black baton that "bounced" a white disc over the tops of the lyrics. The movement was captured on high-contrast film that rendered the stick invisible. The ball would usually appear as white-on-black, though sometimes the ball and lyrics would be superimposed over (darkened) still drawings or photographs or even live-action footage.

While the Screen Song series started out employing standard songs such as "The Yankee Doodle Boy", "My Pony Boy", and "Yes! We Have No Bananas", the series soon integrated live action appearances of celebrities of Broadway, radio, and recordings. Many of these Screen Songs were planned as promotions for live theatrical appearances. This was part of a new marketing plan launched by Paramount for the 1930–1931 season. Rudy Vallee was the first on-screen celebrity, appearing in Betty Co-Ed (1931), and returned in "Kitty from Kansas City" (1931). He also appeared in a cameo in "Rudy Vallee Melodies" (1932). Other celebrities included The Boswell Sisters singing "When It's Sleepy Time Down South" (1932), Arthur Tracy in "Russian Lullaby" (1931) and "Romantic Melodies" (1932), Ethel Merman in "Let Me Call You Sweetheart" (1932), "You Try Somebody Else" (1932), "Time on My Hands" (1932), and "Song Shopping" (1933).

The Mills Brothers appeared in three Screen Songs: "I Ain't Got Nobody" (1932), "Dinah" (1933), and "When Yuba Plays the Rumba on the Tuba" (1933). Lillian Roth appeared in "Down Among the Sugar Cane" (1932) and "Ain't She Sweet" (1933).

Rose Marie (later famous from television's The Dick Van Dyke Show) was an established child singer in the late 1920s and made a number of early Vitaphone shorts for Warner Brothers billed as "Baby Rose Marie". She appeared in "Sing Babies, Sing" (1933). Radio comedians Stoopnagle and Budd appeared in the zany Stoopnocracy that also featured 12-year-old Harold Nicholas of the famous Nicholas Brothers Dance Team as a baby Cab Calloway.

By 1935, the Screen Songs series capitalized on the new Swing Era and featured appearances by a number of the Big Band Orchestras. This series of films was more commercially oriented with the films being booked a week in advance of live appearances of each orchestra. From 1935 to 1938, the "Screen Songs" featured the orchestras of Abe Lyman, Richard Huber, Hal Kemp, Vincent Lopez, Joe Reichman, Dick Stabile, Nat Brandwynne, Hal King, Shep Fields, Gus Arnheim, Jay Freeman, Jerry Baline, Bert Block, Frank Dailey, and Jimmy Dorsey. Although a popular attraction, the Screen Songs series was retired after nine years.

The Screen Songs were revived in 1945 starting with "When G.I. Johnny Comes Home" and continued into the early 1950s using an animated ball with a bounce cycle rendered on pan cells cel animation. Some modern video editing programs offer a "bouncing ball" feature. Others, as in karaoke, achieve the same effect by highlighting each displayed syllable as it is sung. An attempt was made to revive the series in 1963 with "Hobo's Holiday", using a more modern folk music style. Meanwhile, in the United States, younger generations of children continued to be familiar with the cartoons from television rebroadcasts into the 1970s and home video collections. They are now present on the Internet, on sites such as YouTube and Dailymotion.

== See also ==
- Disney Sing-Along Songs
