= Rudy Vallée =

American musician (1901–1986)

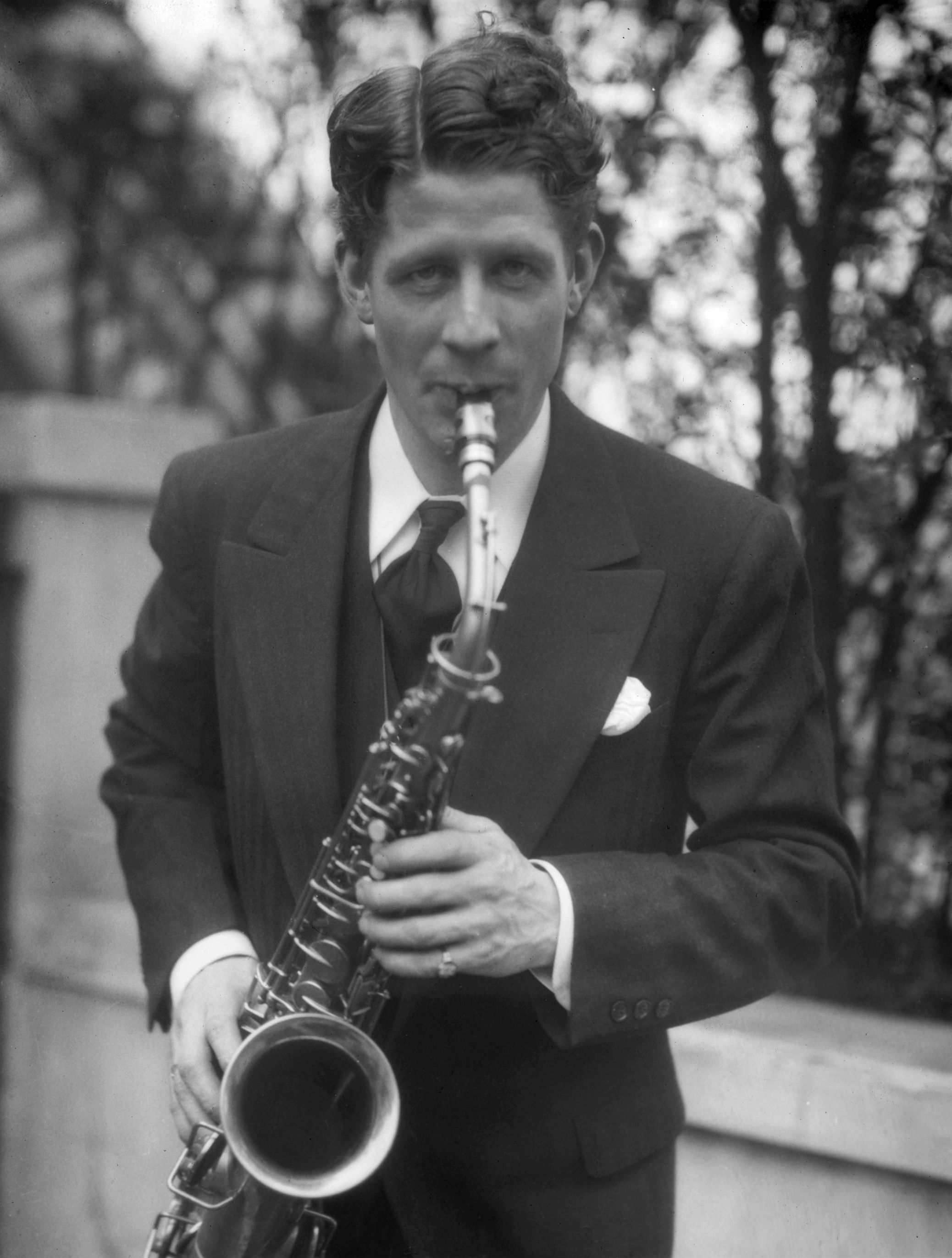
- Vallée, c. late 1920s
- Born: Hubert Prior Vallée; July 28, 1901; Island Pond, Vermont, U.S.
- Died: July 3, 1986 (aged 84); Los Angeles, California, U.S.
- Education: University of Maine; Yale University
- Occupations: Singer; musician; bandleader; actor; radio host
- Years active: 1924–1984
- Known for: The Fleischmann's Yeast Hour
- Notable work: Rudy Vallée & His Connecticut Yankees discography
- Musical career
- Genre: Traditional pop
- Instruments: Vocals; saxophone; clarinet
- Labels: Harmony; RCA Victor; Bluebird; Columbia; Hit of the Week; Melotone; Viva
- Formerly of: Savoy Havana Band; Yale Collegians; Rudy Vallée & His Connecticut Yankees
- Military career
- Branch: United States Navy; United States Coast Guard
- Service years: 1917; 1941–1944
- Rank: Lieutenant
- Commands: 11th District Coast Guard Band
- Awards: World War I Victory Medal; American Campaign Medal; World War II Victory Medal
- Website: rudyvallee.com

Hubert Prior Vallée (July 28, 1901 – July 3, 1986), known professionally as Rudy Vallée, was an American singer, musician, actor, and radio host. He was one of the first modern teen-idol pop stars.

== Early life ==
Hubert Prior Vallée was born in Island Pond, Vermont, United States, on July 28, 1901, the son of Catherine Lynch and Charles Alphonse Vallée. His maternal grandparents were English and Irish, while his paternal grandparents were French-Canadians from Quebec. Vallée grew up in Westbrook, Maine. On March 29, 1917, he enlisted to fight in World War I but was discharged when U.S. Navy authorities discovered he was only 15 years old. He had enlisted in Portland, Maine, under the false birth date of July 28, 1899. He was discharged at the Naval Training Station in Newport, Rhode Island, on May 17, 1917, after 41 days of active service.

== Career ==
=== Music ===
After playing the drums in his high school band, Vallée played clarinet and saxophone in bands around New England as a teenager. From 1924 to 1925, he played with the Savoy Havana Band at the Savoy Hotel in London, where band members discouraged his attempts to become a vocalist. After returning to the United States, he joined the Maine Alpha chapter of Sigma Alpha Epsilon while briefly attending the University of Maine. He received a degree in philosophy from Yale University, where he played in the Yale Collegians with Peter Arno, who became a cartoonist for The New Yorker magazine.

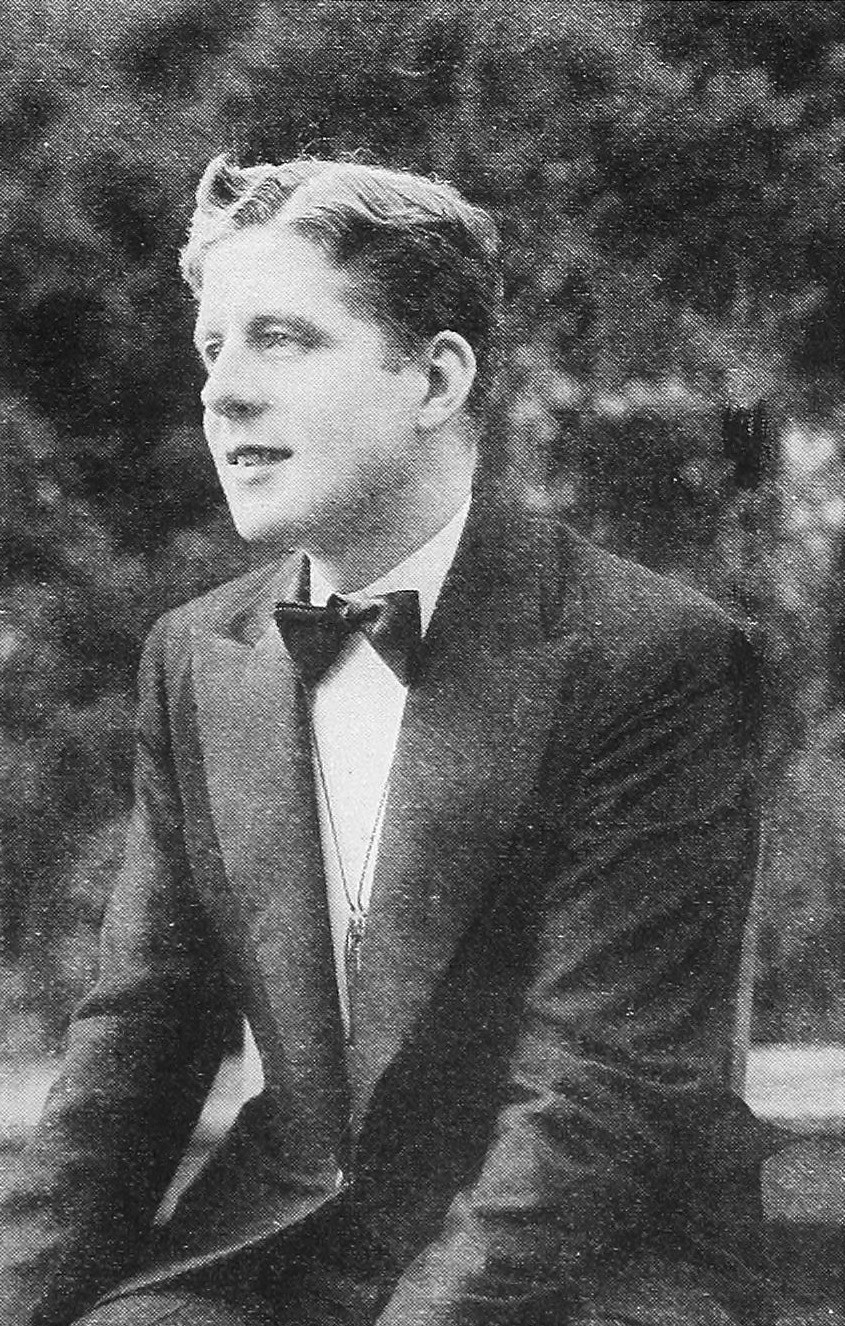
Vallée, c. 1929

After graduation, he formed Rudy Vallée and the Connecticut Yankees, having named himself after saxophonist Rudy Wiedoeft. With this band (formed in 1928), which included two violins, two saxophones, a piano, a banjo, and drums, he began singing. He had a thin, wavering tenor voice and seemed more at home singing sweet ballads than jazz songs. But his singing, suave manner and boyish good looks attracted attention, especially from young women. Vallée was given a recording contract, and, in 1928, he started performing on the radio, first at New York station WABC, leading his Yale Collegians Orchestra, and then on WEAF and the NBC Red Network beginning in February 1929.

Vallée was one of the first crooners. While singers needed strong voices to fill theaters in the days before microphones, crooners had soft voices that were suited to the intimacy of radio; the microphones, in this case, promoted direct access to "a vulnerable and sensuous interior", or in other words, "a conjured intimacy". Vallée's trombone-like vocal phrasing on "Deep Night" would inspire Bing Crosby, Frank Sinatra, and Perry Como to model their voices on jazz instruments.

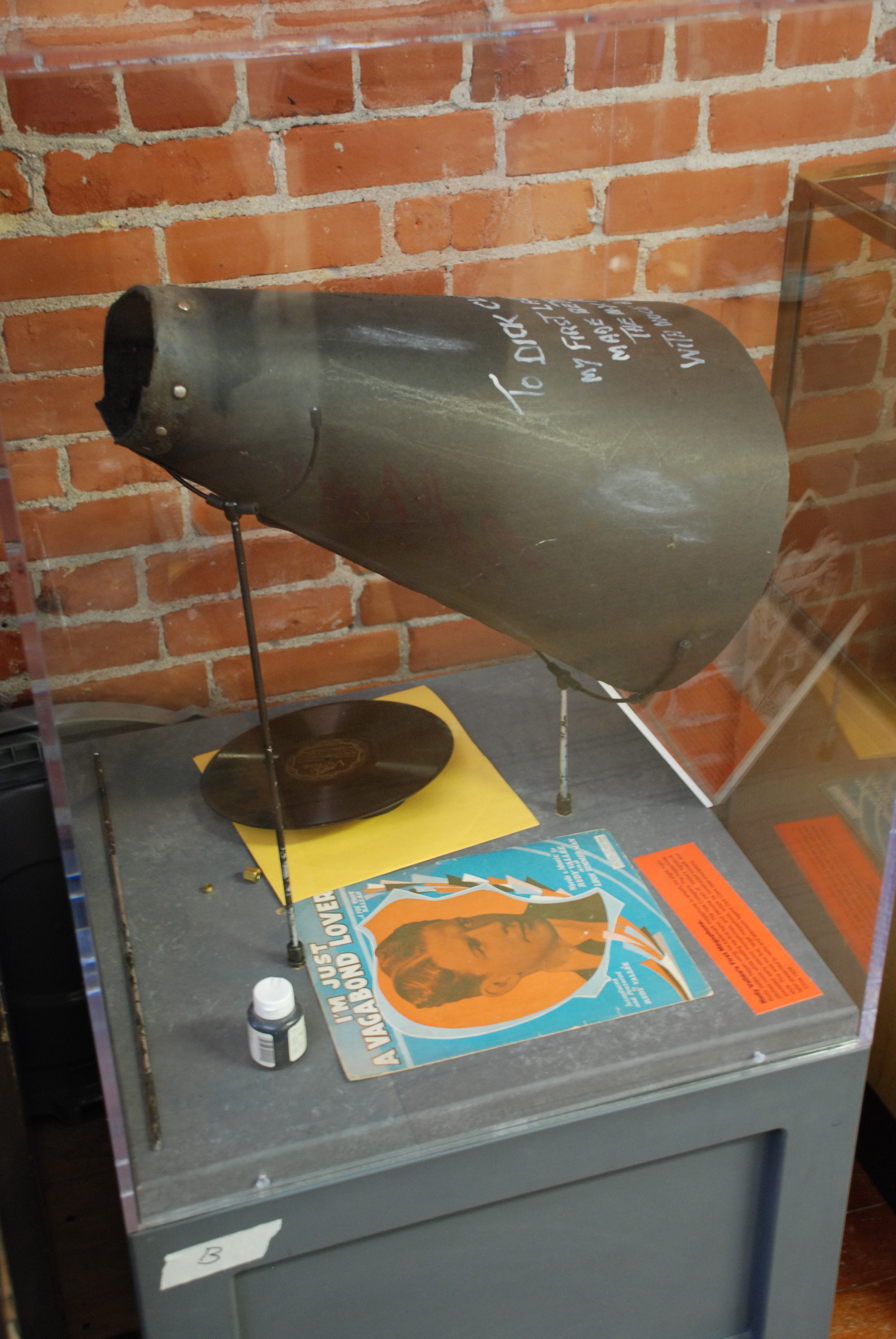
Vallée's megaphone, crafted in between shows at the New York Palace in May 1929

Vallée was one of the first celebrity pop stars and flappers pursued him wherever he went. His live appearances were usually sold out. Contrary to popular belief, he did not have screaming girls at his appearances. However, his voice still failed to project in venues without microphones and amplification, so he often sang through a megaphone. A caricature of him singing this way was depicted in the Betty Boop cartoon Poor Cinderella (1934). Another caricature is in Crosby, Columbo, and Vallee, which parodies him, Bing Crosby, and Russ Columbo.

In the words of a magazine writer in 1929, "At the microphone he is truly a romantic figure. Faultlessly attired in evening dress, he pours softly into the radio's delicate ear a stream of mellifluous melody. He appears to be coaxing, pleading and at the same time adoring the invisible one to whom his song is attuned."

Vallée had his share of detractors as well as fans when his popularity was at its height. Radio Revue, a radio fan magazine, held a contest in which people wrote letters explaining his success. The winning letter, written by a man who disliked Vallée's music, said, "Rudy Vallee is reaping the harvest of a seed that is seldom sown this day and age: LOVE. The good-looking little son-of-a-gun really and honestly LOVES his audience and his art. He LOVES to please listeners—LOVES it more than he does his name in the big lights, his mug in the papers. He loved all those unseen women as passionately as a voice can love, long before they began to purr and to caress him with two-cent stamps."

Vallée made his first records in 1928 for Columbia's low-priced labels Harmony, Velvet Tone, and Diva. He signed to RCA Victor in February 1929 and remained with the company through 1931, leaving after a heated dispute with executives over song selections. He then recorded for the short-lived Hit of the Week label which sold rather poor quality records laminated onto a cardboard base. In August 1932, he signed with Columbia and remained with the label through 1933. Vallée returned to RCA Victor in June 1933; his records were initially issued on Victor's low-priced Bluebird label until November 1933, when he was back on the standard Victor label. He remained with RCA Victor until signing with ARC in 1936. ARC issued his records on the Perfect, Melotone, Conqueror, and Romeo labels until 1937, when he again returned to RCA Victor.

With his group, the Connecticut Yankees, Vallée's best-known recordings include "The Stein Song" (a.k.a. University of Maine school song) in 1929 and "Vieni, Vieni" in the latter 1930s.

His last hit record was a reissue of "As Time Goes By", popularized in the 1942 film Casablanca. Due to the 1942–1944 musicians' strike (and recording ban), RCA Victor reissued the version he had recorded in 1931. During World War II, he enlisted in the U.S. Coast Guard to help direct the 11th district Coast Guard band as a chief petty officer. He was promoted to lieutenant and led the 40-piece band to great success. In 1944, he was placed on the inactive list and returned to radio.

According to George P. Oslin, Vallée, on July 28, 1933, was the recipient of the first singing telegram. A fan telegraphed birthday greetings, and Oslin had the operator sing "Happy Birthday to You".

=== Radio and film ===
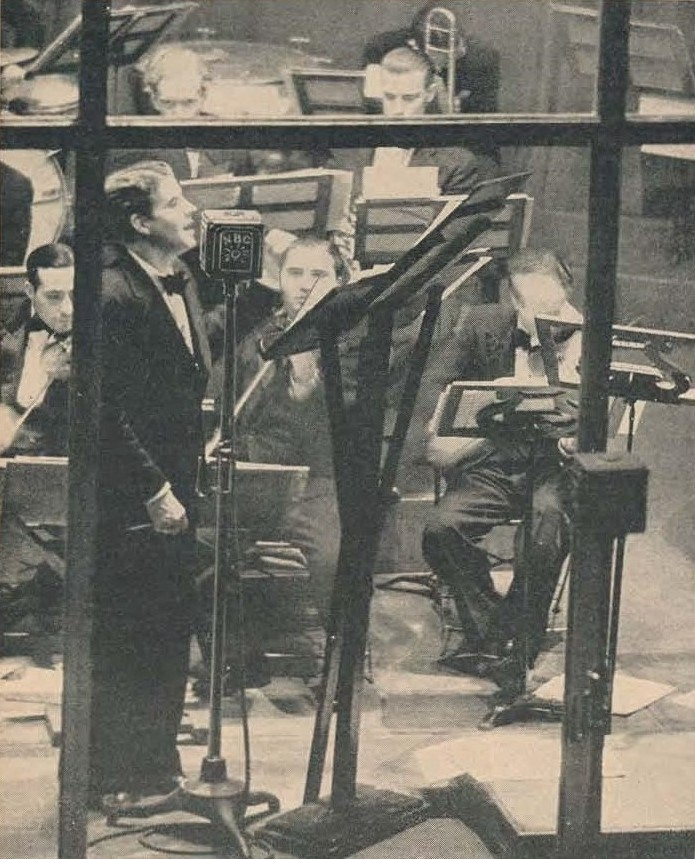
Vallée on The Fleischmann's Yeast Hour in 1933. He always signed on saying "Heigh-ho, everybody!"

In 1929, Vallée began hosting The Fleischmann's Yeast Hour, a popular radio show with guests such as Fay Wray and Richard Cromwell in dramatic skits. Vallée continued hosting radio shows such as the Royal Gelatin Hour, Vallée Varieties, and The Rudy Vallée Show through the 1930s and 1940s.

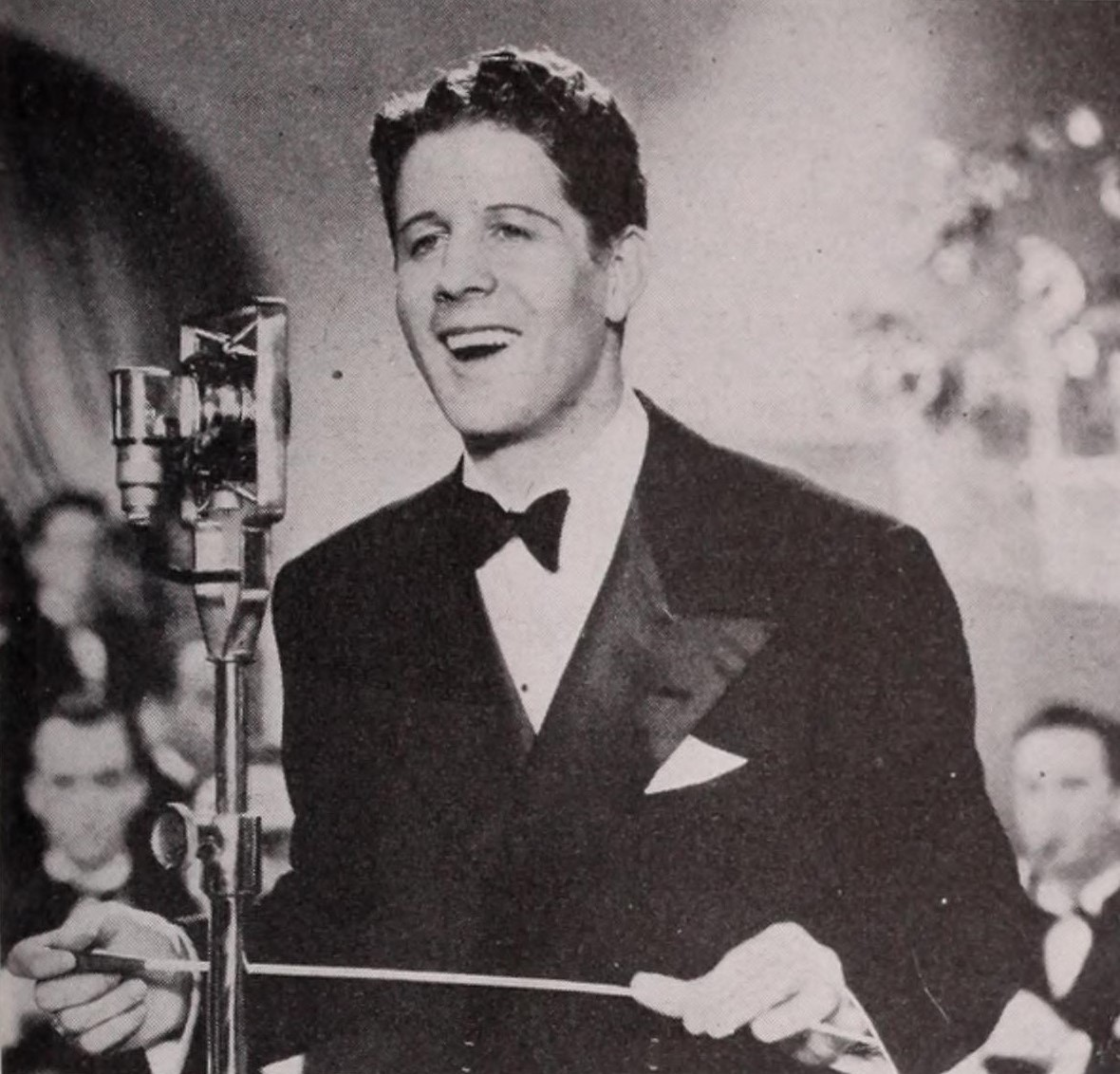
Vallée as bandleader Skip Houston in Sweet Music, 1935

When Vallée took his contractual vacations from his national radio show in 1937, he insisted his sponsor hire Louis Armstrong as his substitute. This was the first instance of an African-American hosting a national radio program. Vallée wrote the introduction for Armstrong's 1936 autobiography Swing That Music.

In 1929, Vallée made his first feature film, The Vagabond Lover, for RKO Radio. His first films were made to cash in on his singing popularity. While his initial performances were rather wooden, his acting greatly improved in the late 1930s and 1940s, and by the time he began working with Preston Sturges in the 1940s, he had become a successful comedic supporting player. He appeared opposite Claudette Colbert in Sturges's 1942 screwball comedy The Palm Beach Story. Other films in which he appeared include I Remember Mama, Unfaithfully Yours, and The Bachelor and the Bobby-Soxer.

In 1955, Vallée was featured in Gentlemen Marry Brunettes, co-starring Jane Russell, Alan Young, and Jeanne Crain. The production was filmed on location in Paris. The film was based on the Anita Loos novel that was a sequel to her acclaimed Gentlemen Prefer Blondes. Gentlemen Marry Brunettes was popular throughout Europe at the time and was released in France as A Paris Pour les Quatre ("Paris for the Four") and in Belgium as Tevieren Te Parijs.

Vallée performed on Broadway as J. B. Biggley in the 1961 musical How to Succeed in Business Without Really Trying and reprised the role in the 1967 film version. He appeared in the 1960s Batman television show as the villain Lord Marmaduke Ffogg and in 1971 as a vindictive surgeon in the Night Gallery episode "Marmalade Wine".

=== Vallee-Video ===
From 1948 to 1952, Vallée owned Vallee-Video, a television production company formed in the early days of national TV broadcasts. The company was incorporated on April 3, 1948. Vallée made 16 mm film shorts for television, including These Foolish Things and Under a Campus Moon, in which he appeared himself. Ed Wynn, Pinky Lee, Buddy Lester, and Cyril Smith also appeared in Vallee-Video productions. Comedy sequences in the productions featured dubbed-in laughter.

In 1949, Vallee-Video produced one of the first cartoon shows on television, Tele-Comics.

Vallee-Video's breakthrough in 1952 would have been a 15-minute television show based on the Dick Tracy comic strip starring Vallée's friend Ralph Byrd, who played the character in four successful Dick Tracy theatrical serials from 1937 to 1941. Vallée sold the show as a pilot to NBC. Vallée and Byrd also worked on a proposed radio show based on the comic strip Hawkshaw the Detective. However, Byrd died in August 1952, bringing the Dick Tracy production to a halt and spelling the end for Vallee-Video.

== Personal life ==
Vallée was married four times: first to Leonie Cauchois in 1928, then to Fay Webb in 1931, to Jane Greer in 1943, and finally to Eleanor Norris in 1949.

Vallée got into a fist fight with producer George White on the set of the 1934 film George White's Scandals. Dorothy Brooks wrote in 1936, "Other stars on the air have their troubles, their disagreements, and yet you don't read about their ending in black eyes. Only Rudy Vallée seems to figure in endings of this kind." In an interview with Brooks, Vallée claimed he found fighting "savage and stupid" and "the wrong way to try to solve problems, because it never solves them". When asked why he got into fights, he replied, "I just lost my temper. I'll admit I have a too-quick temper."

During his divorce from his second wife, Fay Webb, in 1936, she alleged that "Vallée is possessed of a violent, vicious, and ungovernable temper, and given to the use of blasphemy and the use of intemperate, vile, and vituperative language, particularly when applied to [her]". She accused him of committing adultery with three women, including actress Alice Faye. Vallée denied the allegations, and the judge found him "not guilty of any misconduct or maltreatment of Webb which detrimentally affected her health, physical or medical condition".

NBC announcer George Ansbro wrote in his memoir that Vallée "had quite a temper and a very foul mouth ... almost always the butt of his nastiness was the orchestra ... his outbursts were mean-spirited, and he didn't care who overheard". Alton Cook, however, wrote, "Vallée may be fuming at his orchestra, but a Vallée hour rehearsal never quite loses its air of being a gathering of old friends ... Rudy is grimly serious about rehearsal. He sometimes has his band spend a quarter-hour going over one short passage that doesn't satisfy him. On those occasions his temper wears thin".

Vallée married his third wife, Jane Greer, on December 2, 1943, in Hollywood, but they separated after three months and divorced on July 27, 1944.

He married his fourth wife, Eleanor Norris, in 1949, and they remained together for the rest of his life. Always loyal to Yale University, Vallée never forgot his Maine roots and maintained an estate at Kezar Lake.

Vallée died of cancer at his home on July 3, 1986, while watching the televised centennial ceremonies of the restored Statue of Liberty. His wife Eleanor said that his last words were "I wish we could be there; you know how I love a party." Eleanor, wrote a memoir of their life together titled My Vagabond Lover.

== Legacy ==
In 1995, a Golden Palm Star on the Palm Springs, California, Walk of Stars was dedicated to him.

For his work in radio, Vallée was inducted into the Vermont Association of Broadcasters Hall of Fame in 2011.

== Filmography ==
Films
Year	Title	Role	Notes
1929	Rudy Vallee and His Connecticut Yankees	Himself	Vitaphone Varieties #771; Lost film (soundtrack survives, containing the songs "Deep Night" and "Outside")
1929	Radio Rhythm	Himself	Short
1929	The Vagabond Lover	Rudy Bronson	
1929	Glorifying the American Girl	Himself	
1930	The Stein Song	Himself	Short
1931	Kitty from Kansas City	Himself	Short
1931	Musical Justice	Judge	Short
1932	College Sweethearts	Professor Vallee	Short
1932	The Musical Doctor	Dr. Vallee	Short
1932	Rudy Vallee Melodies	Himself	Short
1933	International House	Himself	
1934	George White's Scandals	Jimmy Martin	
1934	Hollywood on Parade # B-9	Himself	
1935	Sweet Music	Skip Houston	
1938	Gold Diggers in Paris	Terry Moore	Alternative title: The Gay Impostors
1939	Second Fiddle	Roger Maxwell	
1941	Too Many Blondes	Dick Kerrigan	
1941	Time Out for Rhythm	Daniel "Danny" Collins	
1942	The Palm Beach Story	John D. Hackensacker III	
1943	Happy Go Lucky	Alfred Monroe	
1945	It's in the Bag!	Himself	
1945	Man Alive	Gordon Tolliver	
1946	People Are Funny	Ormsby Jamison	
1946	The Fabulous Suzanne	Hendrick Courtney, Jr.	
1947	The Sin of Harold Diddlebock	Lynn Sargent	Alternative title: Mad Wednesday
1947	The Bachelor and the Bobby-Soxer	District Attorney Tommy Chamberlain	Released in the UK as Bachelor Knight
1948	I Remember Mama	Dr. Johnson	
1948	So This Is New York	Herbert Daley	
1948	Unfaithfully Yours	August Henshler	
1948	My Dear Secretary	Charles Harris	
1949	Mother Is a Freshman	John Heaslip	Alternative title: Mother Knows Best
1949	The Beautiful Blonde from Bashful Bend	Charles Hingleman	
1949	Father Was a Fullback	Mr. Roger "Jess" Jessup	
1950	The Admiral Was a Lady	Peter Pedigrew	
1954	Ricochet Romance	Worthington Higgenmacher	
1955	Gentlemen Marry Brunettes	Himself	
1957	The Helen Morgan Story	Himself	Alternative titles: Both Ends of the Candle; Why Was I Born?
1957	How to Succeed in Business Without Really Trying	Jasper B. Biggley	
1968	Live a Little, Love a Little	Louis Penlow	With Elvis Presley
1968	The Night They Raided Minsky's	Narrator	Voice
1970	The Phynx	Himself	
1975	Slashed Dreams	Proprietor	Alternative title: Sunburst
1976	Won Ton Ton, the Dog Who Saved Hollywood	Autograph Hound	

Television
Year	Title	Role	Notes
1953	The Ford 50th Anniversary Show	Himself	Song medley and banter with Bing Crosby and Frank Sinatra
1956	The Johnny Carson Show	Himself	1 episode
1956–1957	December Bride	Himself	2 episodes
1957	The Lucy–Desi Comedy Hour	Himself	1 episode
1961	What's My Line?	Himself	1 episode
1967	Batman	Lord Marmaduke Ffogg	3 episodes
1969	Petticoat Junction	Herbert A. Smith	Episode: "But I've Never Been In Erie, Pa"
1970	Here's Lucy	Himself	1 episode
1971	Night Gallery	Dr. Francis Deeking	1 episode
1971–1972	Alias Smith and Jones	Winford Fletcher	2 episodes
1976	Ellery Queen	Alvin Winer	Episode: "The Adventure of the Tyrant of Tin Pan Alley"
1979	CHiPs	Arthur Forbinger	Episode: "Pressure Point"
1984	Santa Barbara	Elderly Con	1 episode (final appearance)

== Gallery ==
=== Illustrations ===
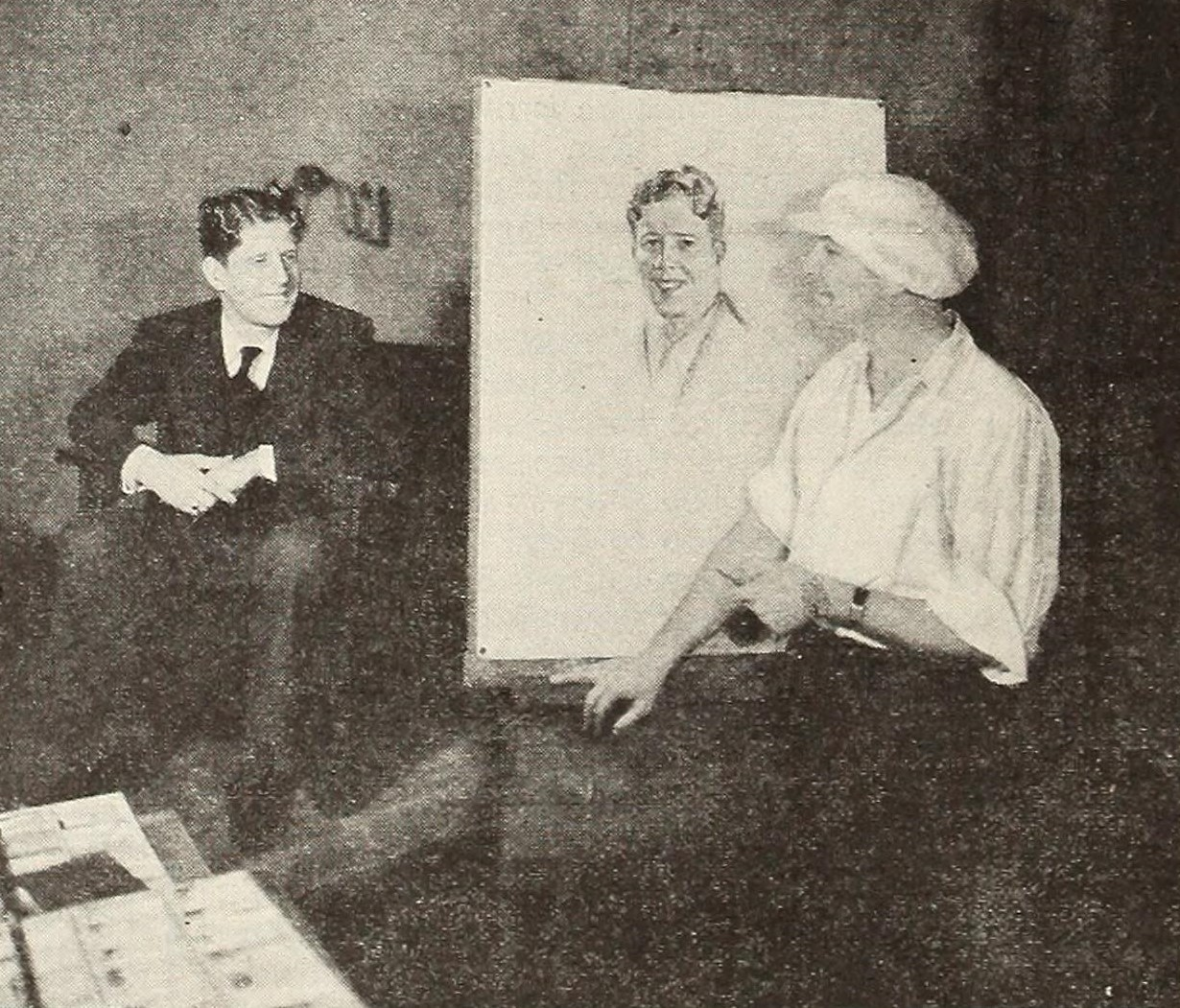
In the process of being painted by Rolf Armstrong on November 21, 1929

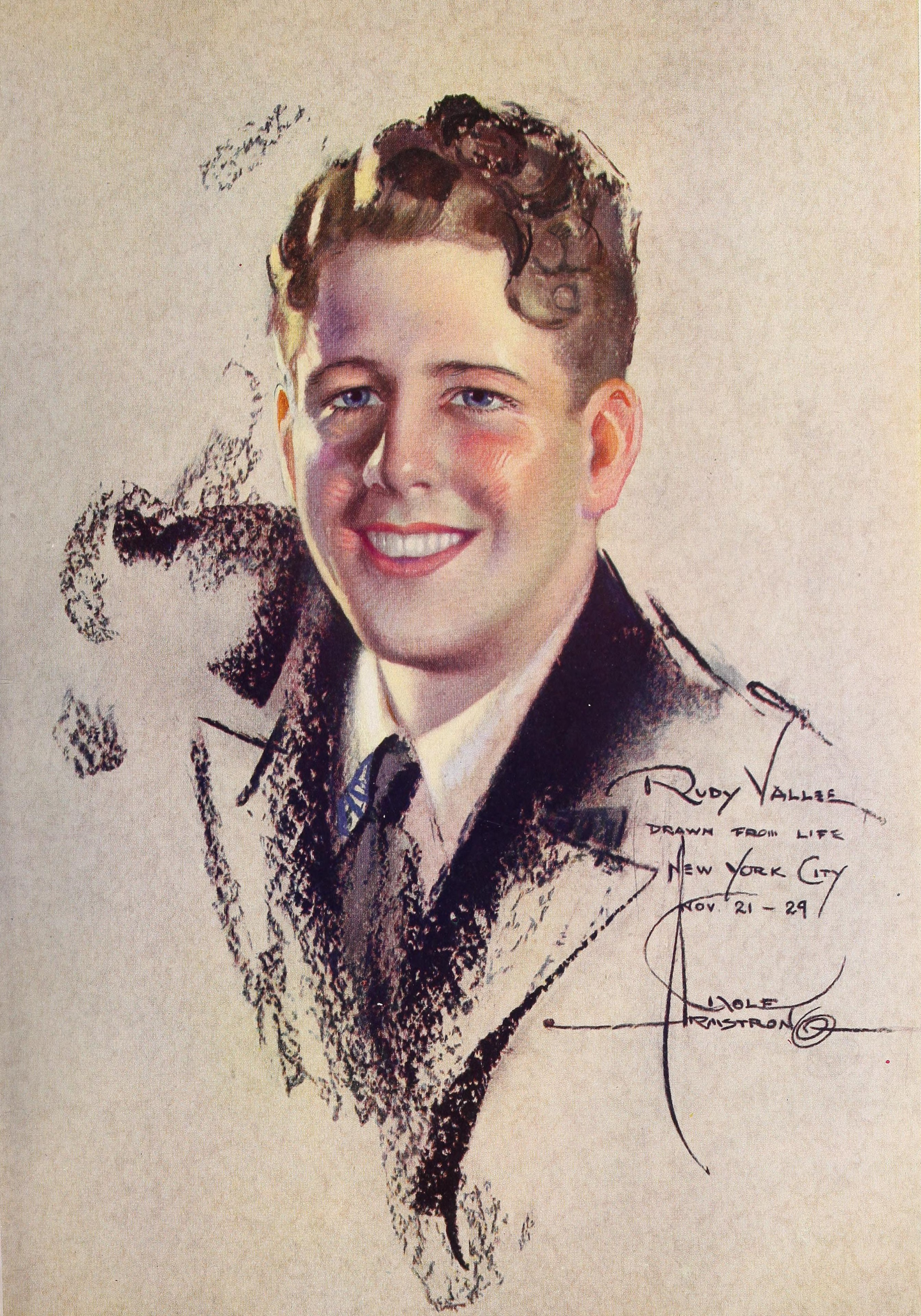
Portrait by Rolf Armstrong, November 21, 1929

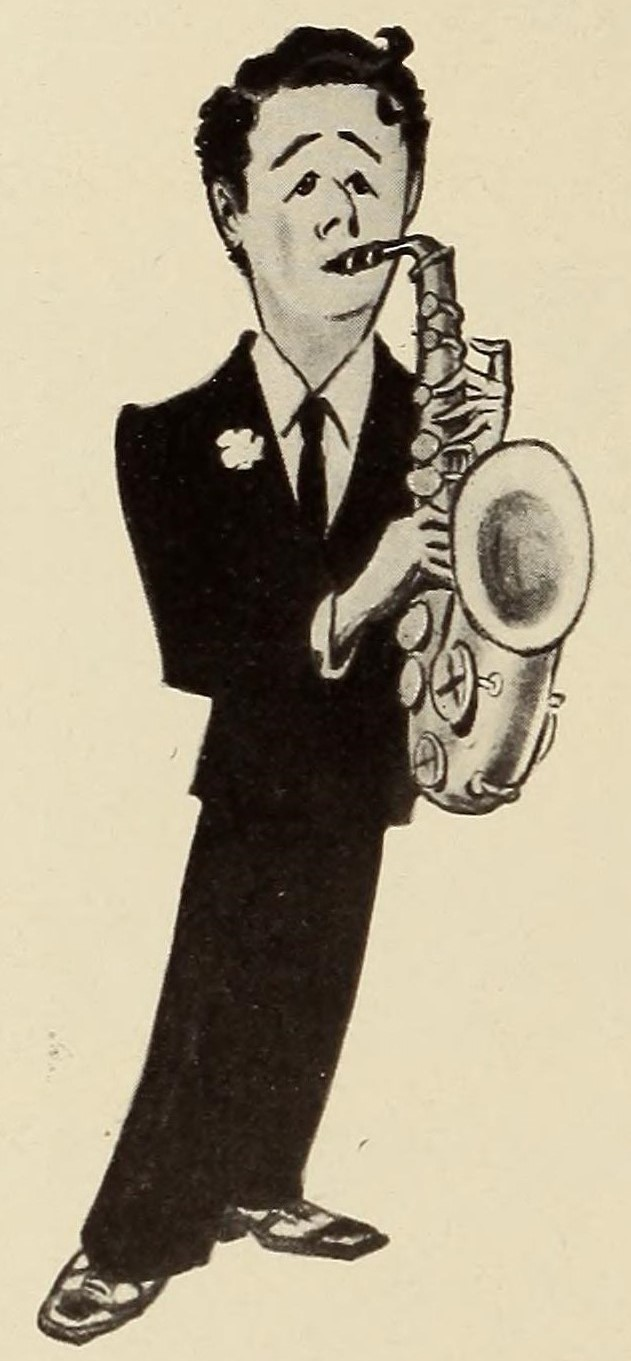
1929 caricature from Radio Revue

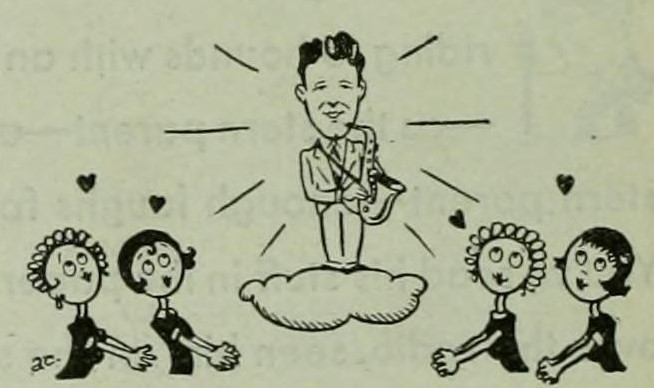
1930 caricature from Photoplay

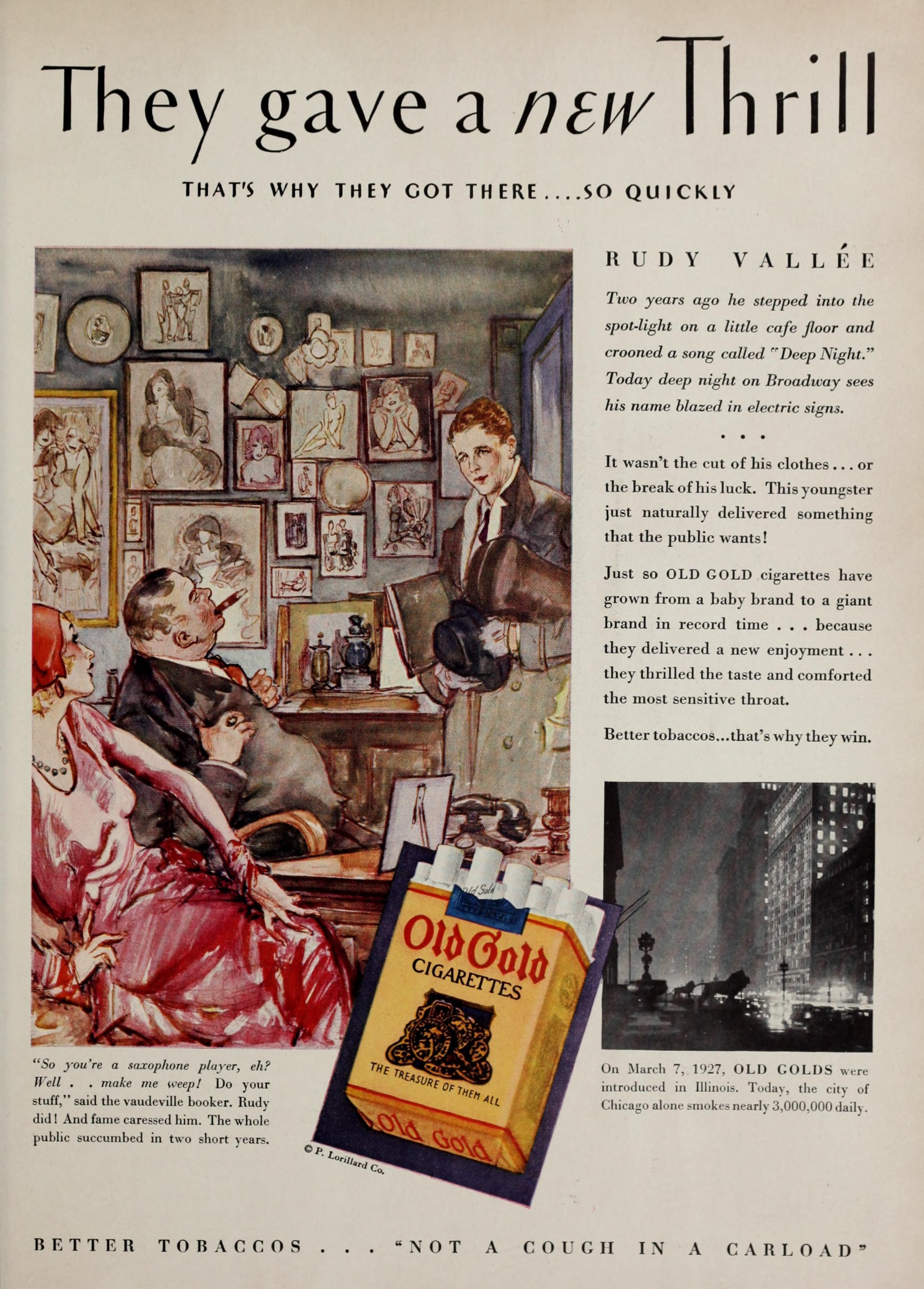
Advertisement for Old Gold Cigarettes with a fabricated biography

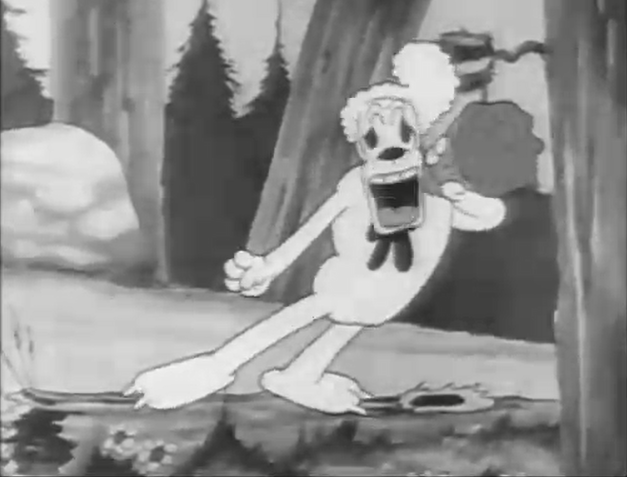
Caricature in the 1932 Merrie Melodies cartoon Crosby, Columbo, and Vallee; note the megaphone and the curl in his hair

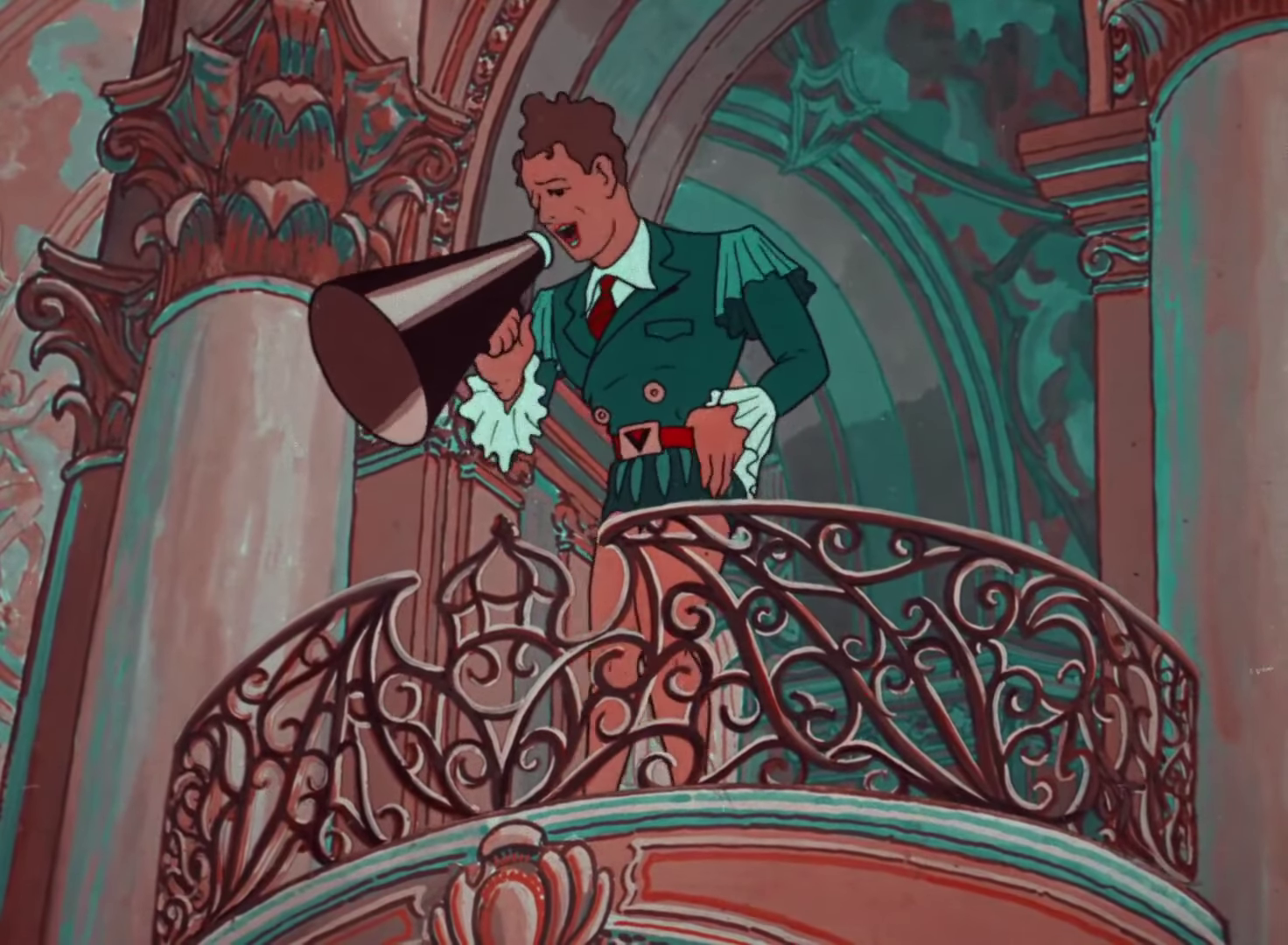
Caricature in the 1934 Betty Boop cartoon Poor Cinderella

=== Magazine covers ===
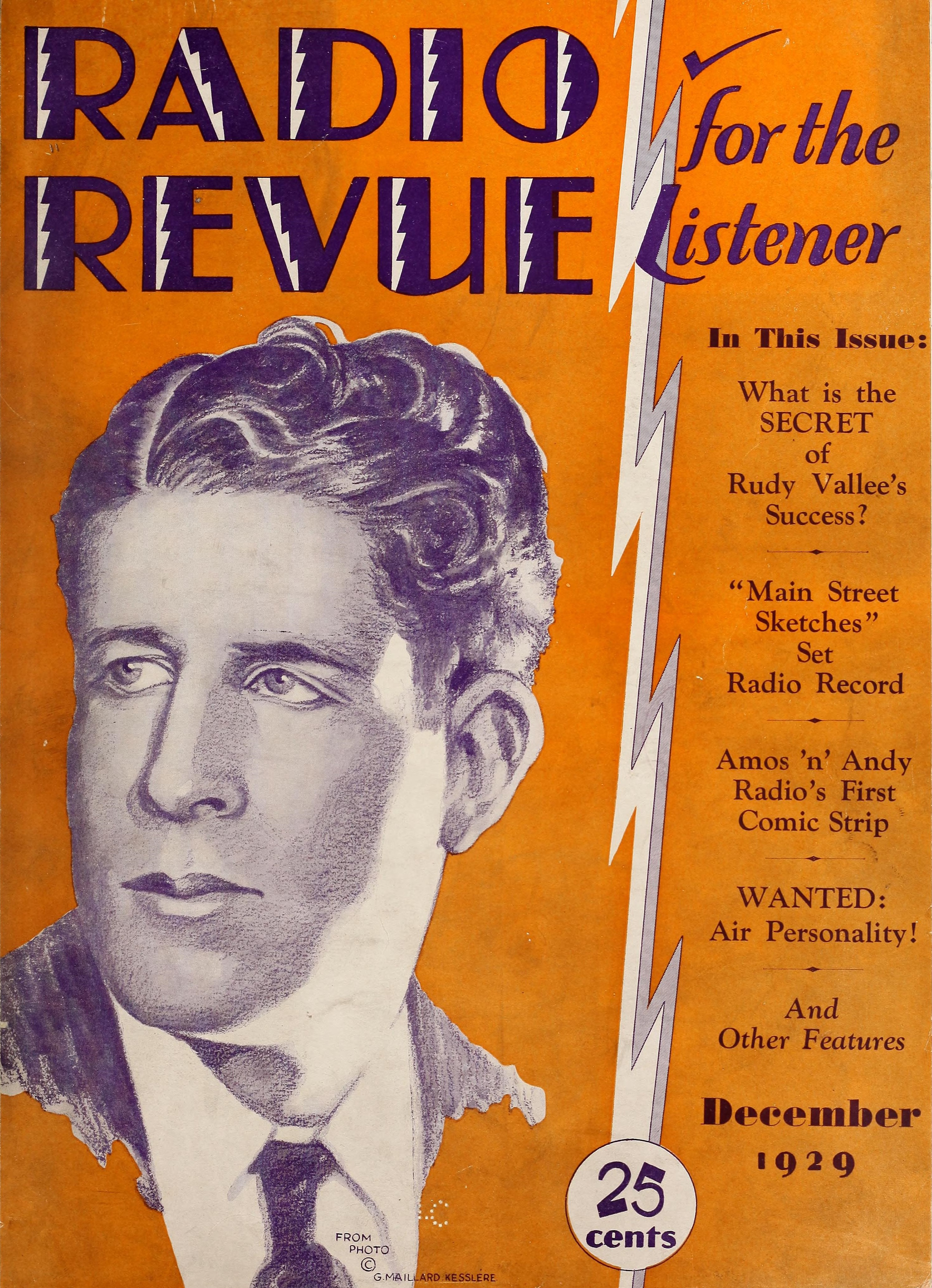
Radio Revue, December 1929

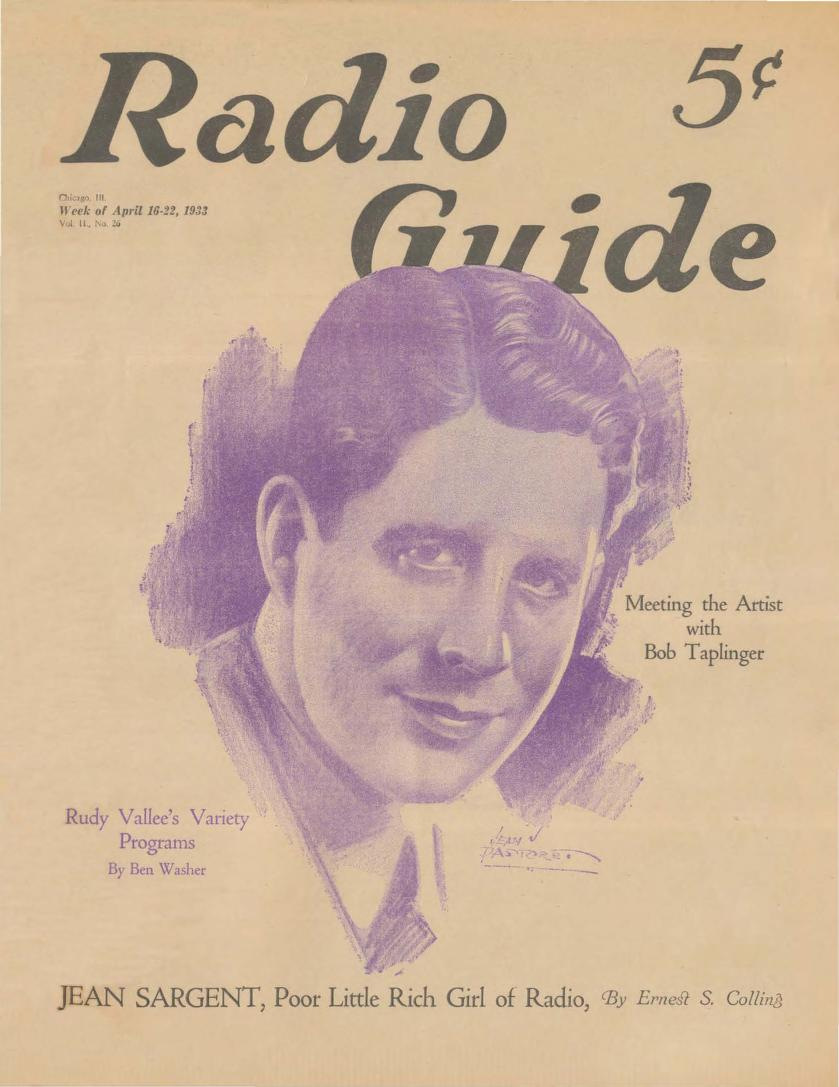
Radio Guide, April 16–22, 1933

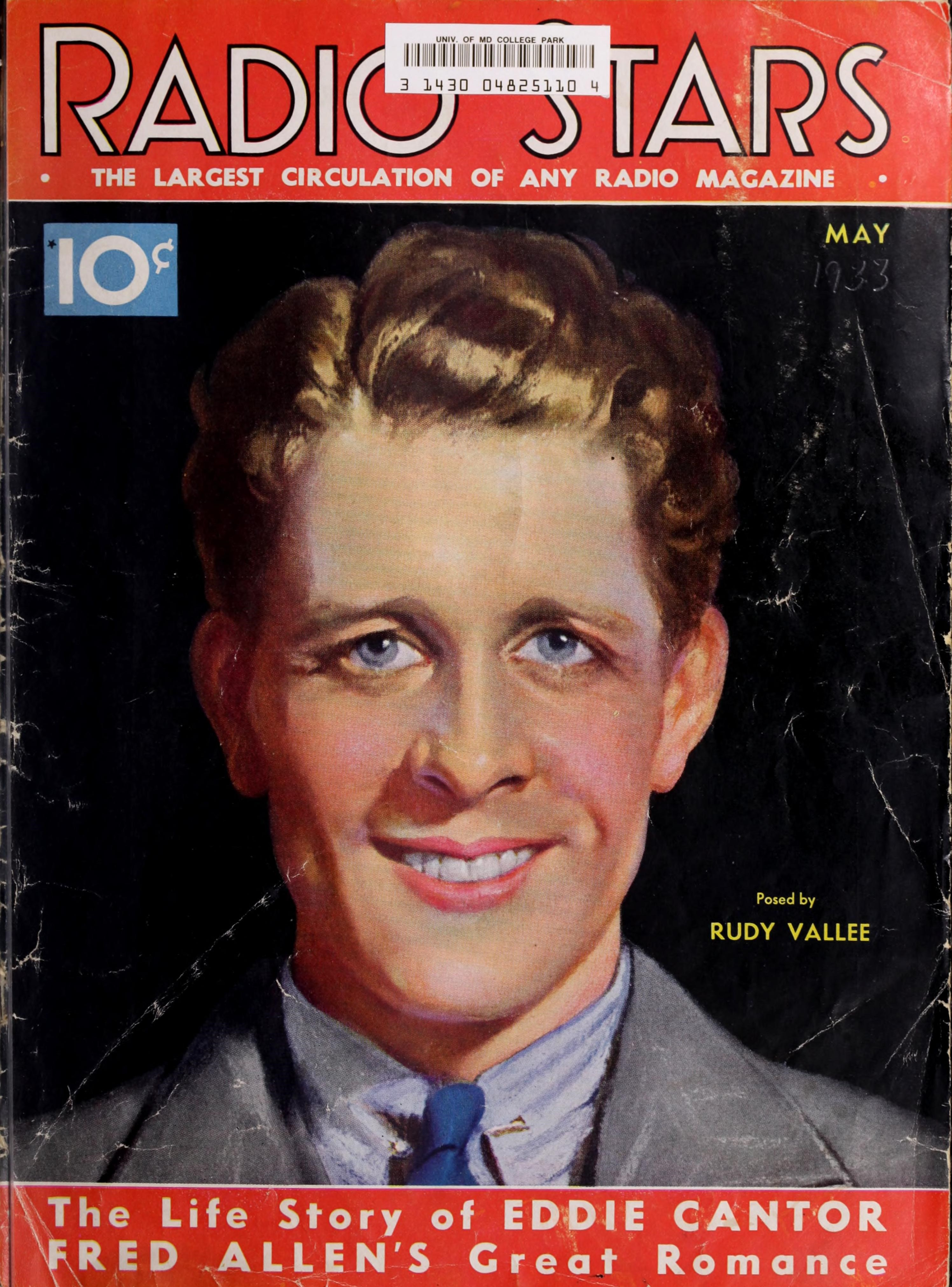
Radio Stars, May 1933

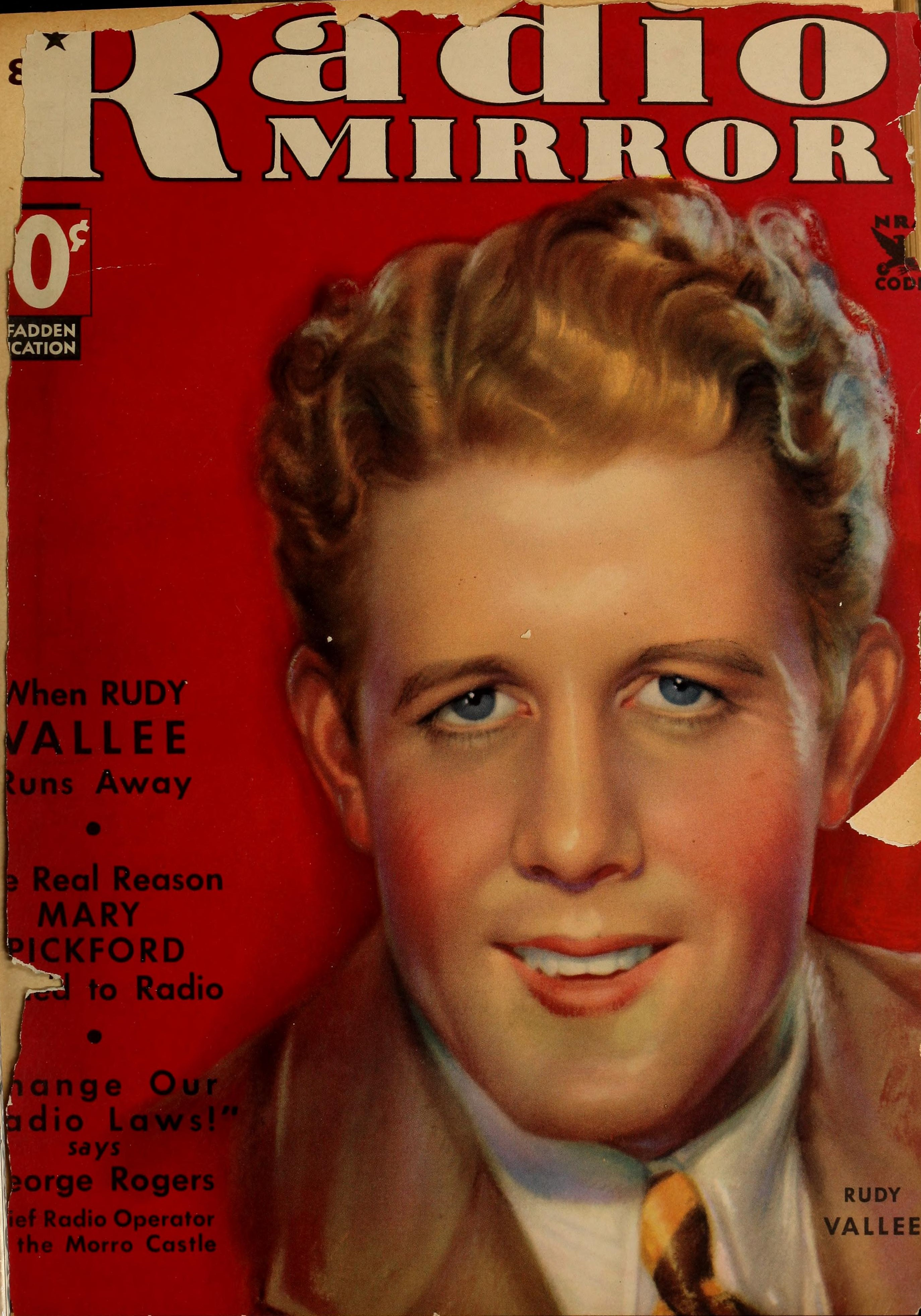
Radio Mirror, December 1934

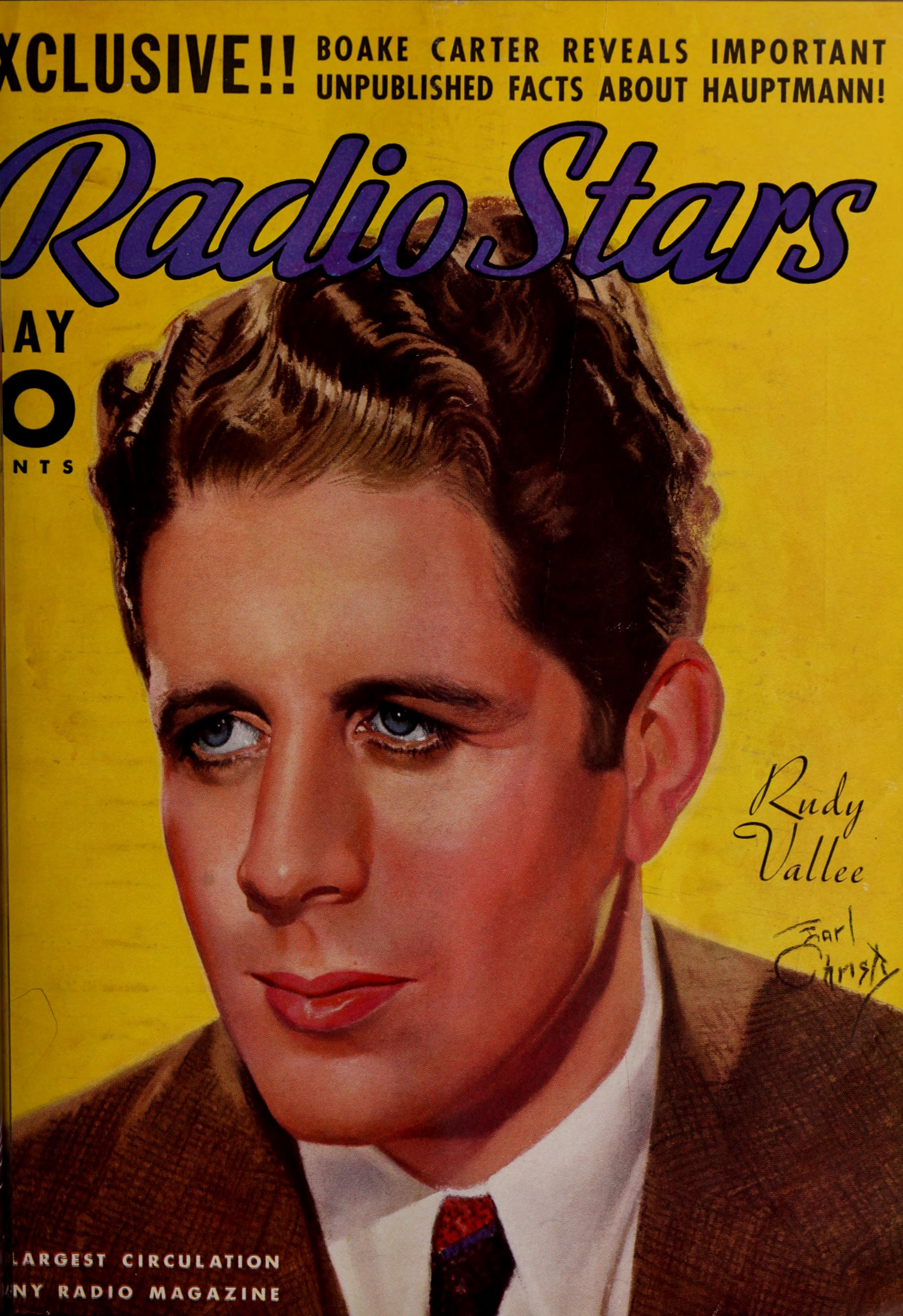
Radio Stars, May 1936

== See also ==
- Vallee Family House, a house listed on the National Register of Historic Places in Westbrook, Maine

== Bibliography ==
- Walker, Leo (1976). The Wonderful Era of the Great Dance Bands.
