= List of Little Lulu characters =

This is the list of the characters from the comic strip and comic book Little Lulu.

== Main characters ==
Lulu Moppet
- First appearance: 1935
- Created by: Marjorie Henderson Buell
- Voiced by: Cecil Roy (Paramount shorts only); Tracey Ullman & Jane Woods (TV series only)

In-universe information
- Species: Human
- Gender: Female

- Louise "Little Lulu" Moppet – The main character and Tubby and Annie's best friend. She is very smart, but stubborn and always initiates a battle with the boys to expose that the girls are as good as them. Lulu is also very creative and tells stories to Alvin to teach him a lesson with fun. She wears a red dress along matching hat and has long black curly hair with brown highlights. In Paramount's vintage animated Little Lulu theatrical shorts, she was voiced by Cecil Roy. In The Little Lulu Show, she was voiced by Tracey Ullman (Season 1 only) and Jane Woods (Seasons 2-3 only).
- Tubby Tompkins – Lulu's male best friend and her chief opponent in their disputes. He is the leader of the boys' club known as "The Fellers". He has relapsed and always forgets to pay the monthly fee or to fulfill the obligations, and his clubmates often take him out of office. He's in love with Gloria, but she's rarely given him a chance, although he never stops trying to win her heart. He has short, gelled-up red hair and wears a white sailor's hat, a black collared shirt and light brown/orange pants, making his outfit very similar to a sailor's uniform. His nature as a fat boy earned him his nickname Tubby. In Paramount's vintage animated Little Lulu theatrical shorts, he was voiced by Arnold Stang. In The Little Lulu Show, he was voiced by Bruce Dinsmore.
- Annie Inch (or Magee) – Lulu's female best friend who is involved in most of Lulu's escapades and adventures. She isn't as smart, but she is a true friend who helps Lulu with her plans. Sometimes, she is annoyed at everyone for no reason. Annie is Iggy's sister. She has short black straight hair and wears a blue dress (in earlier years, she wore a yellow dress). In The Little Lulu Show, she was voiced by Michael Caloz (Seasons 1-2 only) and Vanessa Lengies (Season 3 only).
- Iggy Inch – Tubby's male best friend and a member of the "Fellers". He is grumpy, mischievous and always pulling tricks. Iggy is Annie's brother. He has a shaved head, and wears a white collar shirt and orange pants (in earlier years, he wore an orange collared shirt and blue pants). In The Little Lulu Show, he was voiced by Jane Woods (Seasons 1-2 only) and Dawn Ford (Season 3 only).
- Willie Wilkins – One of Tubby's friends and the strongest member of the "Fellers". He has short black hair and wears an orange newsboy cap, a green shirt and orange knickers (in earlier years, he wore a brown newsboy cap, a red shirt and gray knickers). In The Little Lulu Show, he was voiced by Andrew Henry (Seasons 1-2 only) and Ricky Mabe (Season 3 only).
- Eddie Stimson – One of Tubby's friends and the smartest member of the "Fellers". He often creates the boys' plans against the West Side Boys. While one of the main characters of both the comic and TV series, Eddie plays a much more minor role in the 1970s anime series, appearing in only five episodes with no lines. He has short light blond hair and wears a blue whoopee cap, a red shirt and blue pants. In The Little Lulu Show, he was voiced by Justin Bradley.
- Wilbur Van Snobbe – The richest and most charming boy in town. He likes to be loved by the girls, but he is arrogant and petulant, being sweet only with Gloria. Wilbur has no friends, although he sometimes plays with the other kids. In the TV series however, he is portrayed as being less arrogant and more likable amongst the other kids (though occasionally prone to being antagonistic) and in the 1970s anime series, he is even portrayed as being part of the "Fellers". He has short curly blond hair and wears a purple (sometimes green) suit (in earlier years, he had red hair and a blue suit). He speaks with a snobby European accent. In The Little Lulu Show, he was voiced by Jacob Tierney.
- Gloria Goode (Darling) – The most beautiful girl in town. She is kind and compassionate with the girls, who secretly hate her out of envy, yet she is seductive with the boys, who fall in love with her. In the 1990s animated TV series, Gloria is seen as one of Lulu's friends rather than a rival. She is richer than most of the class, although less than Wilbur. She has long, wavy blonde hair and wears a ruffled pink dress. In The Little Lulu Show, she was voiced by Angelina Boivin.
- Alvin Jones (or James) – Lulu's 6-year-old neighbor. He is mischievous, bratty and only stops tantrums when Lulu tells a story. He has red hair with a quiff and wears a white shirt and blue overalls. In The Little Lulu Show, he was voiced by Ajay Fry (Seasons 1-2 only) and Jonathan Koensgen (Season 3 only).
- Mrs. Martha and Mr. George Moppet (Lulu's Mom & Dad) – Lulu's parents. She's a great cook. He always is targeted by Tubby's pursuit as a detective. In Paramount's vintage animated Little Lulu theatrical shorts, George was differently voiced by Jackson Beck and Wendell Holmes. In The Little Lulu Show, they are voiced by Pauline Little and Gary Jewell.
- Mrs. Ellie and Mr. Jim Tompkins (Tubby's Mom & Dad) – Tubby's parents. In The Little Lulu Show they are voiced by Susan Glover and Arthur Grosser.
- The West Side Boys – A gang of stronger, tougher bully boys from across town who are the rival club of the "Fellers" and always try to invade their club. The most frequently seen of the West Side Boys are Butch (the leader), Mickey and Spike, while other individual members include Mike, Slug, Junior and Guggy. In The Little Lulu Show, they are voiced by Michael Yarmush, Justin Bradley and Bruce Dinsmore.

== Supporting characters ==
- Margie – One of Lulu's friends. She is smart and helps Lulu in her plans against the boys. She falls in love with Eddie, but never told anyone. She has short light brown hair and wears a yellow dress. In The Little Lulu Show, she was also voiced by Angelina Boivin.
- Jeannie and Joannie – Identical twin sisters and both of Lulu's friends. They think the same and always complete each other's sentences. They both have long curly light brown hair and wear white shirts with orange overalls. In The Little Lulu Show, they are voiced by Danielle Desormeaux.
- Miss Memie Feeny – The kids' schoolteacher, who can never discipline them. In The Little Lulu Show, she was voiced by Ellen David.
- Poor Little Girl – A poor clone of Lulu, she is the main character in the stories that Lulu tells Alvin, who is always in trouble. She wears a tattered, patched dress.
- Witch Hazel and Little Itch –The witches (aunt and niece) of the stories that Lulu tells to Alvin. In the stories, Itch usually antagonizes the Poor Little Girl and Hazel supports her efforts. They did not appear in the TV series.
- Cranberry – Wilbur's butler. He speaks with a British accent. He was also voiced by Bruce Dinsmore.
- Mr. Benjamin and Mrs. Hinda Van Snobbe (Wilbur's Mom & Dad) – Wilbur's parents. His mother speaks with a regal English accent. They are investors of the stock exchange and millionaires. In The Little Lulu Show, they are voiced by Sonja Ball and Terrence Scammell.
- Mr. Davis and Mrs. Abby Inch (Annie and Iggy's Mom & Dad) – Annie and Iggy's parents. The mother is Martha's best friend and a good cook, though she always tests new recipes. They are voiced by Pauline Little and Terrence Scammell.
- Mr. Frankie Ernest – The school's principal.
- Officer McNab – One of the district's truant officers. He often incorrectly assumes Lulu to be playing hookey. In The Little Lulu Show, He speaks with an Irish accent and was voiced by Terrence Scammell.
- Sammi – A Martian and the leader of the Little Men, who appear only in the Tubby comics. He always comes to Earth to ask for help from Tubby in some trouble, but always helps him in return.
- Chubby Tompkins – Tubby's lookalike cousin (except he is smaller). Tubby dislikes his visits and tries to hide.

== Minor characters ==
- Mandy - Lulu's Black American housekeeper only appeared in some vintage Paramount cartoons.
- Cedric Jones – Alvin's baby brother. He did not appear in the TV series.
- Kathy Crowe – Alvin's only friend at school. Their relationship resembles that of Lulu and Tubby.
- Al – The owner of the Sunset Diner. He gives Tubby's unpleasant stale pies.
- Miss Clef Myster – Tubby's violin teacher. She was also voiced by Pauline Little.
- Mr. and Mrs. James (or Jones) – Alvin's and Cedric's parents. Mrs. Jones (Alvin's Mom) was voiced by Kate Hutchison.
- Grandpa Feeb (or McFeeb) – Annie and Iggy's grandfather, who is becoming deaf and forgetting things.
- Ada – A slightly overweight girl and Lulu's friend who is only seen in the earlier comics.
- Bernie – A bad boy who becomes Lulu's friend when she discovers that he is a pleased boy under the bully image. He appears rarely. He was also voiced by Andrew Henry.
- Suzy –One of Lulu's friends. She has long auburn hair with pigtail braids and wears a light blue dress. She appears rarely. She was also voiced by Angelina Boivin.
- Freddie – An ugly boy who falls in love with Lulu. He appears rarely.
- Gertie Greenbean – Lulu's friend who lives in a trailer home traveling the country with her mother. She spends a time in town and gets into fights with Wilbur. In The Little Lulu Show, she was also voiced by Angelina Boivin.
- Fifi – A French girl who befriends Lulu when she travels to Paris. She speaks with a French accent.
- Gregory Gallant – One of the minor male characters in the 1990s animated TV series. A best-known male child star, the protagonist of "Rich Little Poor Boy". In the real world, he has an obnoxious, egotistic and self-centered attitude and is rude towards his fans (especially the girls). He gets a taste of his own medicine post-show after chasing Lulu out of the show's venue, stumbling and ending up falling on Lulu's feet due to being tripped by Tubby. He was also voiced by Ricky Mabe.
- Marilyn – A female child star (named after a real-world actress) She is the leading lady of "Rich Little Poor Boy", the on-screen partner of Gregory Gallant; In the animated TV series' episode entitled, "Tiny Tot's Syrup", she replies to Lulu during an audition, "Oh, Please... I'm a professional." She was also voiced by Angelina Boivin.
- Marty the Midget – A notorious criminal who escaped prison after exchanging identities with Tubby. He is soon captured when Lulu outwitted his antics. He has the same voice as Binky from Marc Brown's Arthur (another WildBrain Montreal production). He was also voiced by Bruce Dinsmore.

== See also ==
- Little Lulu and Her Little Friends
- The Little Lulu Show
