= Tubby Tompkins =

- cover of Dell Comics' Four Color #461, featuring Marge's Tubby by John Stanley

Publication information
- Publisher: Dell Comics
- First appearance: 1946
- Created by: Marjorie Henderson Buell, John Stanley
- Voiced by: Arnold Stang (1940s theatrical shorts); Bruce Dinsmore (The Little Lulu Show)

In-story information
- Full name: Thomas "Tubby" Tompkins
- Team affiliations: The Fellers
- Notable aliases: "The Spider"

Tubby Tompkins, generally referred to as Tubby, is a comic book character created by Marjorie Henderson Buell. The character Thomas "Tubby" Tompkins first appeared in the Little Lulu comic panel in The Saturday Evening Post and went on to appear alongside Lulu in comic books, advertising, and animated cartoons, as well as in his own solo comic book series beginning in 1952.

Both preternaturally hungry and egotistical, Tubby's overriding monomania and blissful lack of self-awareness propel him through an endless series of near-disasters and minor epics of suburban adventure. Although he is best known as Little Lulu's sometimes-boyfriend and comic foil, Tubby is also Lulu's nemesis, acting as the antagonist in many of her adventures. Tubby is the leader of The Fellers, a gang of neighbourhood boys with a strict "No Girls Allowed" policy in their clubhouse, and it is in this role that he most often runs afoul of Lulu and her genius.

== Character evolution ==
Marge began introducing male school friends for Little Lulu in her panel for the Post as early as 1937. These unidentified boys (the strip was in pantomime, with no captions or word balloons) were often dressed alike, in typical schoolboy fashions of the period, with short pants, large collar with bow tie, suit jacket, and tiny sailor cap. Gradually, a more portly version of these boys began to appear, eventually becoming a "regular" in the feature, usually as a suitor or playmate to Lulu. Marge referred to this character as "Joe" but it wasn't until the character was adapted into animated form in a series of short films produced for Paramount that something of his personality began to emerge and the new name of Tubby was first used. Tubby makes silent appearances in two Lulu shorts from 1944, "It's Nifty to Be Thrifty" (released August 18, 1944), in which he appears licking a lollipop and wearing a blue shirt, and "Lulu's Birthday Party" (released December 1, 1944), where he appears as a party guest wearing a black shirt. However, in the next year's "Beau Ties" (released April 20, 1945), Tubby takes center stage as "Fatso", erstwhile boyfriend of Lulu, who discovers him two-timing her with Gloria (known in this cartoon as "Fifi") at the malt shop. The cowardly Fatso, voiced by popular character actor Arnold Stang, is then tormented by Lulu as punishment for his infidelity. The character next appears in "Bored of Education" (released March 1, 1946), at last named "Tubby" but dressed as a series of historical figures imagined by Lulu in a daydream. It is at this point that the basic Tubby template finally emerges, if only in name and costume.

At the mid-point of the film series (and with the Post gig ended in 1944), and several merchandised Lulu books to her credit, Marge turned to licensing the Lulu concept to comic books, inking a deal with Dell Comics to publish a series of try-out issues beginning in 1945. The characters of Lulu and Tubby appear together for the first time in this format in Dell Comics' Four Color #74 in a story titled "The Costume Party" and written and drawn by cartoonist John Stanley. Stanley had created several "proto-Tubby" characters earlier in his career with Dell and began applying some of these traits to Marge's fat school chum. The Tubby and Lulu of this first comic book story are both anarchic in character but that would change as Stanley gradually evolves both: Lulu becomes the voice of logic and Tubby comes to embody a sort of anarchic force of nature, impervious to societal critique or censure. The success of these four one-shots lead to a long-running Little Lulu series beginning in 1948, and eventually to a solo series for Tubby (Marge's Tubby), beginning with another series of one-shot try-outs in 1952 and running in various formats until 1964 thru issue #49.

== John Stanley's Tubby ==
Because Tubby was little more than a simple stereotype when his comic book adventures began, John Stanley was able to use him as a vehicle to explore a variety of themes and put his own stamp on the character. In this sense, Tubby is a relative rarity in the world of licensed American children's comics, akin to the Uncle Scrooge stories by Carl Barks. Under Stanley's guidance, through hundreds of stories, Tubby eventually reveals a reliable group of mostly anti-social personality traits that come to propel the narratives of his adventures. The comics critic Bill Schelly has proposed a six-point guide to Tubby's complex motivations and drives. According to Schelly, Tubby:

- Always seeks status, asserting (and assuming) his primacy, and claims to understand everything. That his concepts have little or no connection to reality never occurs to him.
- Is aware of social niceties but is so self-involved that he has little or no consideration for them when he is going after what he wants. Yet, when others don't take his feelings into account, Tubby whines.
- Aspires to be "what a man is supposed to be" from his kid point of view: a fireman, an Indian fighter, a hunter, detective, mountain climber, etc., pretending stoicism in the face of danger. Acknowledges no contradicition when he screams "MAWWWW" when he is even slightly hurt or afraid.
- Uses "kid logic" to interpret the world around him and solve problems.
- Absolutely believes in the superiority of men over women. He has to feel that he always has the upper hand with Lulu, even though it's clear she has the upper hand most of the time.
- Far from feeling stigmatized for being fat, he feels it entitles him to more food than others. Food is the most important thing to him, even trumping status.

— Bill Schelly, John Stanley: Giving Life to Little Lulu

With a multi-faceted character like Tubby in the role of coprotagonist in the Lulu stories, or as the protagonist of his own solo adventures, John Stanley was then free to add on to and expand the universe of these characters in a world-building exercise, introducing a supporting cast of characters and a variety of stock situations. These basic premises and situations would then be used to tell a humorous story with a series of more and more outrageous scenarios, actions and gags. Most of these premises are grounded in the reality of Tubby's small town environment, with the very occasional foray into a fantasy or science fiction setting. The generic situations include: 1) Romance (i.e., a romantic triangle involving Tubby and either Gloria, Lulu, or Wilbur); 2) Battle of the sexes (i.e., Tubby and The Fellers have some sort of conflict with Lulu); 3) crime or mystery (i.e., Tubby, as "The Spider", investigates a purported or imagined crime, invariably suspecting Lulu's father); and 4) Fantasy, science fiction or deus ex machina (i.e., Tubby has a dream or interacts with aliens).

== Supporting characters ==
- Lulu Moppet: Tubby's best friend and friendly rival.
- The Spider: Tubby's alias. A Sherlock Holmes-ian detective whose arch-enemy is Lulu's father.
- The Fellers: Tubby's gang. Tubby is the usual leader of this gang. Their headquarters is a clubhouse hidden in the woods with a prominent "No Girls Allowed" sign.
- The West Side Gang: A rival gang of tough kids.
- The Little Men from Mars: Diminutive aliens with amazing scientific powers and telepathy.
- George and Martha Moppet: Lulu's parents. She's a great cook. He works with Mr. Tompkins and always is targeted by Tubby's pursuit as a detective.
- Jim and Ellie Tompkins: Tubby's parents. Tubby refers to them as "Maw" and "Paw".

== Reprints ==
In 2010, Dark Horse reprinted the companion Tubby series (Little Lulu's Pal Tubby) in volumes similar to their Lulu volumes.

- The Castaway and Other Stories ISBN 1-59582-421-9 (reprints Four Color Comics No. 381, 430, 444, 461 and Tubby #5–6 in full color)
- The Runaway Statue and Other Stories ISBN 1-59582-422-7 (reprints Tubby #7–12 in full color)
- The Frog Boy and Other Stories ISBN 1-59582-635-1 (reprints Tubby #13–18 in full color)
- The Atomic Violin and Other Stories ISBN 1-59582-733-1 (reprints Tubby #19–24 in full color)

'John Stanley Library: Tubby', by John Stanley with book design by Seth (Drawn and Quarterly, 2010) ISBN 9781770460232 (collects issues 9-12 of the Dell Comics series)

Tubby is also featured prominently in many Little Lulu stories, many of which have been reprinted.

== Other media ==
In addition to the original Paramount Pictures animated films, Tubby and Lulu have appeared in numerous television series.
