= Little Lulu Library =

Slipcase cover to Volume III of the Little Lulu Library.

The Little Lulu Library is an 18-volume deluxe hardcover series of books reprinting a long run of Little Lulu comics from the period when John Stanley was writing the stories. Most of the stories collected were drawn by either Stanley or Irving Tripp. At the time they were published, they were the only Little Lulu comics that were in print in the English language.

The series was published by Another Rainbow Publishing between 1985 and 1992. The six three-volume boxed sets (18 volumes) of the Library reprinted the Little Lulu Four Color comics #374-387 as well as issues 1-87 of Little Lulu comics. Besides reprinting the Little Lulu stories, each set contains background articles on the artists, essays, and previously unpublished art.

== Reproduction ==
The eighteen 9" x 12" hardcover volumes are housed in 6 slipcases. The stories are reproduced larger than comic size and most are printed in black and white—while the front covers to the original comics are in full color. They are very similar in construction to the 30 volume/10 set collection of the Carl Barks Library, also published by Another Rainbow.

They reprinted Little Lulu Four Color #374-387 as well as issues 1-87 of the Little Lulu series. Each set also contains background articles on the artists, essays, and previously unpublished art. The artwork of most of the Stanley-drawn stories in the books, however, was "crudely trace[d...]as photostats for them did not exist."

The contents of the books were later scanned and republished (minus background material) as the first 18 volumes of Dark Horse Comics' Little Lulu reprint series, which then continued on in full colour, reprinting Little Lulu comics that Another Rainbow had not managed to get to.

== Volumes ==
The volumes were published in reverse order, with Volume VI coming first and Volume I last.

- Set I (published 1992)
  - Book I reprints Four Color Comics #74, 97, 110, 115
  - Book II reprints Four Color Comics #120, 131, 139, 146, 158
  - Book III reprints Four Color Comics #165 and Little Lulu #1-5
- Set II (published 1991)
  - Book I reprints Little Lulu #6-11
  - Book II reprints Little Lulu #12-17
  - Book III reprints Little Lulu #18-21
- Set III (published 1989)
  - Book I reprints Little Lulu #22-26
  - Book II reprints Little Lulu #27-31
  - Book III reprints Little Lulu #32-36
- Set IV (published 1988)
  - Book I reprints Little Lulu #37-41
  - Book II reprints Little Lulu #42-48
  - Book III reprints Little Lulu #49-53
- Set V (published 1986)
  - Book I reprints Little Lulu #54-57
  - Book II reprints Little Lulu #58-62
  - Book III reprints Little Lulu #63-67
- Set VI (published 1985)
  - Book I reprints Little Lulu #68-73
  - Book II reprints Little Lulu #74-80
  - Book III reprints Little Lulu #81-87

== Reception ==
A number of cartoonists, including Daniel Clowes and Chester Brown, have cited the Little Lulu Library series as making Lulu work available that influenced their own work.

== See also ==
- John Stanley (comics)
- Marge (cartoonist)
