= List of The Little Lulu Show episodes =

The following is a list of episodes for The Little Lulu Show, an animated series based on the homonymous character and her comic books created by Marjorie Henderson Buell (better known as "Marge"). It was produced by CINAR Animation, with the only co-production of TMO-Loonland for Season 3.

== Series overview ==
Season	Segments	Episodes	Originally released	
Season	Segments	Episodes	First released	Last released
1	18	6	October 22, 1995	December 26, 1995
2	60	20	May 3, 1996	July 4, 1996
3	78	26	November 30, 1998	February 21, 1999

== Episodes ==
=== Season 1 (1995) ===
No. overall	No. in season	Title	Original release date
1	1	"Green Girl" "Rainy Day" "Beautiful Lulu"	October 22, 1995 (HBO); November 11, 1995 (CTV)
Green Girl - Lulu stains her skin with green ink, which rouses a lot attention over her presumed illness.; Rainy Day - On a rainy day, Tubby and Lulu try to visit each other, but always happen to be in the wrong place.; Beautiful Lulu - Lulu overhears the boys saying she's homely. Mrs. Moppet gives her a new makeover which makes all the boys lovestruck.
2	2	"Alvin's Record Player" "Lulu's Television Debut" "Crybaby"	December 17, 1995
Alvin's Record Player - Mr. Moppet wants Lulu to put a stop to Alvin's annoying music on his record player. Nothing can get Alvin to stop.; Lulu's Television Debut - Mr. Quell wants to get back a valuable vase from Mrs. Moppet. As Lulu tries to deliver it, she appears on television.; Crybaby - Alvin is crying for no apparent reason. Lulu and Tubby start to quarrel over men and women's capabilities until they get bored of it.
3	3	"Snowball War" "Jr. Detective Tubby" "Picnic Pirates"	December 18, 1995
The Snowball War - The girls wage a snowball war against the boys who have been ambushing them with snowballs. After much battling, the boys are defeated.; Jr. Detective Tubby - Tubby goes detective to find out who is scribbling graffiti around. To Lulu's annoyance Tubby himself did it.; Picnic Pirates - Willie and Tubby steal the girls' picnic basket, then the girls take advantage of Willie and Tubby's missing clothes.
4	4	"Gilbert the Gorilla" "Snow Business" "The Case of the Egg in the Shoe"	December 19, 1995
Gilbert the Gorilla - Lulu visits the zoo wearing a strong aroma which makes Gilbert the Gorilla attracted to her.; Snow Business - Lulu and Annie compete against the boys to make some money off snow shovelling people's sidewalks.; The Case of the Egg in the Shoe - Lulu is accused of putting an egg in her father's shoe, but Tubby's investigation reveals it was a chicken.
5	5	"Business Girl" "The Pet Duck" "Lulu's Umbrella Service"	December 25, 1995
Business Girl - Lulu and Annie open a lemonade stand.; The Pet Duck - Lulu takes a wild duck home for a pet. Tubby tells Lulu that Daffy the Clown was missing his own pet duck Wilfred.; Lulu's Umbrella Service - Wilbur gets umbrella service from Lulu which is quite troublesome for Lulu, but eventually the joke's on Wilbur.
6	6	"Friends and Enemies" "The Beauty Contest" "Rich Little Poor Boy"	December 25, 1995
Friends and Enemies - 2 surprises await Lulu when she invites her enemies to her birthday party and her friends don't come. However she receives a surprise from her friends in the end.; The Beauty Contest - The boys start up a beauty contest and Gloria bribes them to make her the winner. Lulu makes sure that is not to be.; Rich Little Poor Boy - The newspaper publish that Lulu is in love with Gregory Gallant and Lulu tries to clear her name.

=== Shorts (1995–96) ===
These special mini-episodes, shown with the title of "Lulu-Bite", were transmitted only in the first 2 seasons (from 1995 to 1996) as an interlude between 1 episode and another. They are all musically themed and the characters do not speak.

No.	Title	Storyboarded by	Original release date
S01	"Childcare 101 / TV Trouble"	TBA	November 11, 1995
S02	"Lulu's Yoyo / Apple Surprise"	TBA	December 17, 1995
S03	"For the Birds / Tunnel Vision"	TBA	December 18, 1995
S04	"Helpful Hands / Old Dog-New Trick"	TBA	December 19, 1995
S05	"The Cat's Meow / Soap Disaster"	TBA	December 25, 1995
S06	"Yes Means... Ahhhhhh! / Take the Bus"	TBA	December 26, 1995
S07	"Slurp / Ping Pong Pow"	Jean Lajeunesse	May 3, 1996
S08	"Sucker! / Zzzzz-Yeow!"	Jean Lajeunesse	May 4, 1996
S09	"Flip Flop / The New Do"	Jean Lajeunesse	May 10, 1996
S10	"Oh Me, Oh Meow! / Baby-Line"	Jean Lajeunesse	May 11, 1996
S11	"Seeds Away / Water Girl"	Jean Lajeunesse	May 17, 1996
S12	"Up a Tree / Picture Perfect"	Jean Lajeunesse	May 18, 1996
S13	"Leaves Please / Lulu in the Box"	Jean Lajeunesse	May 24, 1996
S14	"Witching Hour / Hide & Seek"	Jean Lajeunesse	May 25, 1996
S15	"Banana-ade / Bucks in Books"	Jean Lajeunesse	May 31, 1996
S16	"Bubble Gum Fun / Swing City"	Jean Lajeunesse	June 1, 1996
S17	"The Bigger the Stocking... / Santa-Mat"	Jean Lajeunesse	June 2, 1996
S18	"Sweepy Time / Sick as a Dog"	Jean Lajeunesse	June 7, 1996
S19	"Take a Seat / Standing on Only One Leg"	Éric Bergeron	June 8, 1996
S20	"Beddy-Bye / Windbags"	Éric Bergeron	June 14, 1996
S21	"Cat in My Hat / Baseball Blues"	Éric Bergeron	June 15, 1996
S22	"Walk This Way / Seeing Stars"	Éric Bergeron	June 21, 1996
S23	"Bird?, Plane?, or Underwear? / Hat Rack"	Éric Bergeron	June 22, 1996
S24	"Skip It / Train-ing Manual"	Éric Bergeron	June 27, 1996
S25	"Shovel Full of Trouble / Digging In"	Éric Bergeron	June 28, 1996
S26	"Something Fishy / The Rendez-vous"	Éric Bergeron	July 4, 1996

=== Season 2 (1996) ===
No. overall	No. in season	Title	Written by	Storyboarded by	Original release date
7	1	"Boy Cannon Ball" "Noses Off" "Hairy Day"	Patrick Granleese Stephen Ashton Joseph Mallozzi	Sarô Jamie Whitney Sarô	May 3, 1996
Boy Cannon Ball - Lulu is very skeptical about Tubby's cannon firing stunt. Lulu exposes the elements of the boys' trick.; Noses Off - Wilbur frames Lulu for breaking the nose off an antique bust. Wilbur's mom loves the look of the bust from Lulu and Annie's handiwork.; Hairy Day - Lulu and Tubby try to mix a formula to grow Lulu's dad some hair, but instead it stains his head blue. However the tonic they made actually works, only too well.
8	2	"The Popcorn Thief" "The Little Tornado" "She Flies Through the Air"	Thomas LaPierre and Joseph Mallozzi Rowby Goren Brian Cameron Fuld	Robert Browning Sarô Robert Browning	May 4, 1996
The Popcorn Thief - Tubby is hired for detective work at Annie's home cinema to find out who has been stealing popcorn there, enduring a girly night.; The Little Tornado - Believing Lulu has super strength, Tubby permits her into his club. When they assign her to take care of the West Side Boys, a small tornado takes care of them.; She Flies Through the Air - Lulu and Tubby go skiing at Hilltop Mountain, and Lulu becomes an accidental ski champion.
9	3	"Tiny Tot's Syrup" "The Night Before Christmas" "The Piggy Bank Guard"	Brian Cameron Fuld Thomas LaPierre Joseph Mallozzi	Sarô Robert Browning Sarô	May 10, 1996
Tiny Tot's Syrup - Tired of the bad tasting Tiny Tot's Syrup, Lulu goes to the factory to lodge a complaint, which eventually makes the desired changes.; The Night Before Christmas - Tubby's gang creates a plan to trap Santa Claus and get presents for themselves.; The Piggy Bank Guard - Tubby entrusts Lulu to guard his piggy bank so he won't spend it yet. Lulu quits her guard work when she realises he wanted to buy a present for Gloria.
10	4	"Space Kids" "The Case of the Disappearing Drum" "From Hero to Zero"	Joseph Mallozzi Ken Ross Joseph Mallozzi	Robert Browning Robert Browning Sarô	May 11, 1996
Space Kids - Tubby's gang trick Annie and Lulu that their make-belief rocket ship and the trip to Mars is real and the 2 girls respond with their own trick.; The Case of the Disappearing Drum - Tubby thinks Mr. Moppet took Alvin's drum and tries to prove Lulu he is right, all the while making Mr. Moppet go distracted.; From Hero to Zero - Tubby tries to be a hero by saving Lulu, but Lulu takes credit for his heroic deeds.
11	5	"The Old Master" "Swap Shot Pops" "The Detective Story"	Rowby Goren Patrick Granleese Stephen Ashton	Sarô Robert Browning Charles Finck	May 17, 1996
The Old Master - A painter sells one of his paintings to an art museum but it is switched with a painting that Lulu drew.; Swap Shot Pops - Lulu doesn't have enough money to buy a present for her father's birthday. So she decides to swap one of Mr. Tompkins fish trophy for one.; The Detective Story - Tubby becomes the spider again to follow a suspicious-looking man believed to be a bank robber. However he is actually a detective looking for the real thief.
12	6	"The Case of the Missing Wig" "Froglegs" "A Wrong Move"	Ken Ross Thomas LaPierre Rick Jones	Jean-Charles Finck Sarô Gerry Capelle	May 18, 1996
The Case of the Missing Wig - Someone stole Annie's wig for her doll and Lulu asks Tubby for help.; Froglegs - Lulu and Tubby try to find with the frogs to get the Froglegs.; A Wrong Move - Lulu tries to find wood to help her father build a book shelf.
13	7	"Special Delivery" "Little Sew and Sews" "Tubby's Doll"	Shaun Lyng Thomas LaPierre Anne-Marie Perrotta	Robert Browning Jean-Charles Finck Gerry Capelle	May 24, 1996
Special Delivery - Lulu wonders where babies come from.; Little Sew and Sews - The West Side Boys attack both Tubby's gang and Lulu's friends, so Lulu decides to get even.; Tubby's Doll - Tubby gets a doll from his Aunt Martha and tries to get rid of it by giving it to Lulu.
14	8	"Tuxedo Tango" "The Football Star" "Spook Delivery"	Thomas LaPierre Christel Kleitsch Stephen Ashton	Gerry Capelle Sarô Sarô	May 25, 1996
Tuxedo Tango - Lulu is asked by her father to pick up a tuxedo for him but she accidentally picks up officer McNabb's uniform.; The Football Star - The West Side Boys challenge Tubby's gang to a football game.; Spook Delivery - Lulu and Tubby are asked to deliver a package to an old abandoned house.
15	9	"The Dance" "Locked Out" "The Kissing Game"	Barry Julien Thomas LaPierre Joseph Mallozzi	Gerry Capelle Robert Browning Sarô	May 31, 1996
The Dance - Gloria invited Tubby's gang to the dance and Lulu with her friends Annie and Margie.; Locked Out - Lulu is locked outside her house in the night and tries to get back in.; The Kissing Game - Tubby makes a bet with Wilbur that Lulu can kiss him.
16	10	"The Fuzzythingus Poopi" "Leaves for Everyone" "A Moving Experience"	Dennise Fordham Rowby Goren Brian Cameron Fuld	Gerry Capelle Dave Brown Sarô	June 1, 1996
The Fuzzythingus Poopi - Lulu tries to find a gift for her mother's birthday.; Leaves for Everyone - Lulu is asked by her father to rake leaves and she tries to trick Tubby's gang into doing it.; A Moving Experience - Lulu overhears her parents and believes she is moving away.
17	11	"Oh Christmas Tree" "Santa's Snowman" "The Snoopers"	Don Arioli Stephen Ashton and Thomas LaPierre Christel Kleitsch	Gerry Capelle Sarô Robert Browning	June 2, 1996
Oh Christmas Tree - Lulu and her father go to the forest to cut a tree for Christmas, which doesn't come free like they thought.; Santa's Snowman - Lulu and her friends meet Santa's Snowmen.; The Snoopers - Lulu and Tubby receive presents that they don't want. This is just a game Mrs. Moppet and Mrs. Tompkins are playing to teach their children not snoop for presents.
18	12	"The Big Jewel Robbery" "Pot Luck" "The Spook Tree"	Anne-Marie Perrotta and Tan Schultz Joseph Mallozzi Thomas LaPierre	Gerry Capelle Dave Brown Gerry Capelle	June 7, 1996
The Big Jewel Robbery - A thief steals a bunch of jewels and after hiding them, believes that Lulu and Annie stole them.; Pot Luck - Tubby has a fight with Willie. Meanwhile the West Side Boys plot to steal the boys clubhouse.; The Spook Tree - Lulu overhears from Tubby about the Spook Tree and that if you make a wish on it at midnight, it will come true.
19	13	"Valentine's Day" "Gertie Greenbean" "Stop Fiddling Around"	Caroline Maria Rowby Goren David Hamburg and Mitchell Goldsmith	Sarô Sarô Gerry Capelle	June 8, 1996
Valentine's Day - Gloria is getting the boys to give her a valentine.; Gertie Greenbean - Lulu becomes friends with Gertie.; Stop Fiddling Around - While cutting onions, Lulu believes she broke her father's favorite pipe. Tubby tries to learn the violin.
20	14	"Lucky Lulu" "Pieces of Eight" "Jumping Beans"	Shaun Lyng Thomas LaPierre Joseph Mallozzi	Sarô Gerry Capelle Dave Brown	June 14, 1996
Lucky Lulu - Lulu and Annie find a turkey named "Alice" and try to protect her from Tubby's gang and Mr. Moppet.; Pieces of Eight - Lulu, Tubby and Alvin go to the beach and hear about a hot dog contest.; Jumping Beans - Both Lulu and Tubby have to run errands. They trick Iggy into doing them.
21	15	"Alvinsitting" "Two Lulus" "The Hat"	Elyse Friedman Christel Kleitsch Anne-Marie Perrotta and Tean Schultz	Gerry Capelle Sarô Sarô	June 15, 1996
Alvinsitting - Lulu is asked by her mother to babysit Alvin.; Two Lulus - Lulu tells Tubby's gang a story about Mr. Winkle who turns kids into mannequins. They believe her when they see a mannequin of Lulu herself.; The Hat - Lulu and Tubby wreck her mother's new hat and try to fix it.
22	16	"Prisoner Exchange" "The Balloon Derby" "Dummy Skeleton"	Joseph Mallozzi Ken Ross David Hamburg and Mitchell Goldsmith	Gerry Capelle Dave Brown Paul Schibli	June 21, 1996
Prisoner Exchange - Marty the Midget, a criminal who looks like Tubby, escapes from prison and switches places with him.; The Balloon Derby - A contest is held to see how many balloons can be caught.; Dummy Skeleton - Lulu with Annie and Tubby with Iggy have mix up between a mannequin and a skeleton delivery, which also causes quite a commotion.
23	17	"The Bear Trap" "Shirley the Shadow" "A Dog's Life Saver"	Gerald Sanford Thomas LaPierre Dennise Fordham	Dave Brown Sarô Gerry Capelle	June 22, 1996
The Bear Trap - Lulu, Tubby and Wilbur foil a pair of thieves trying to steal his father's money.; Shirley the Shadow - Lulu tells Alvin a story about a little girl who lost her shadow.; A Dog's Life Saver - Lulu wants to have a dog. She tries to stop a dog catcher from capturing a stray.
24	18	"The Bogeyman" "Tattoos" "Mimibur"	Joseph Mallozzi Rowby Goren Barbara Bryan	Sarô Richard Vanatte Dave Brown	June 27, 1996
The Bogeyman - Lulu tells Alvin a story about how she met the Bogeyman.; Tattoos - A new tattoo parlour opens. The idea of children having tattoos causes an uproar from their mothers, but the tattoos are only pictures.; Mimibur - Lulu and Annie dress Wilbur as a girl and send him to his own party, causing him a lot of humiliation.
25	19	"Lancelot Jr." "The Lucky Lady" "5 Little Babies"	Stephen Ashton Rick Jones Thomas LaPierre	Gerry Capelle Dave Brown Gerry Capelle	June 28, 1996
Lancelot Jr. - When Wilbur decides to wear Sir Lancelot Jr.'s suit of armor for fun, Lulu and Tubby want to join in on it.; The Lucky Lady - When a woman in the newspaper offers to give $10 to a child if he or she can prove to be nice, the kids of the town scrabble to clean up their act.; 5 Little Babies - After Lulu gets pranked by Wilbur and the boys, she and Annie get back at them by stealing their clothes and dressing them up in diapers.
26	20	"Potato Kids" "The Ventriloquist" "Bunny Fun"	Thor Bishopric and Todd Swift Lucie Lortie and Peter Landecker Paul Mullie	Dave Brown Gerry Capelle Daniel DeCelles	July 4, 1996
Potato Kids - Lulu unleashes a potato frenzy when she finds one that resembles Tubby.; The Ventriloquist - Tubby starts to trick Lulu and the other guys with mimic voices.; Bunny Fun - Tubby has to perform in a play while wearing a bunny costume.

=== Season 3 (1998–99) ===
No. overall	No. in season	Title	Written by	Original release date
27	1	"The Fright Racket" "The Lucky Gold Piece" "Very Little Lulu"	Paul Mullie	November 30, 1998
The Fright Racket - Lulu must enter a haunted house for initiation if she wishes to join the boy's club.; The Lucky Gold Piece - Lulu tries to find her father's lucky gold piece.; Very Little Lulu Lulu tells Alvin a story of how she shrank when she went out to play in the rain.
28	2	"The Big Egg" "The Little Girl Who Never Heard of Ghosts" "The Case of the Missing Perfume"	Joseph Mallozzi Thomas LaPierre Christel Kleitsch	December 1, 1998
The Big Egg - Tubby charges kids who want to see an egg shaped rock.; The Little Girl Who Never Heard of Ghosts - Alvin locks Lulu in the room and forces her to tell a ghost story. Lulu then tells him the story of a girl who has never heard of ghosts.; The Case of the Missing Perfume - Lulu hires Tubby to find her mother's missing perfume.
29	3	"Wild Boy" "The Whistle Blower" "Elephant Ride"	Joseph Mallozzi Joseph Mallozzi Christel Kleitsch	December 7, 1998
Wild Boy - Lulu and Annie set up an apple juice stand. Tubby gets an idea of dressing up as a wild boy and scaring the girls, but things go too far when the police and grown ups get involved, thinking the wild boy to be real.; The Whistle Blower - The West Side Boys take over the club house, while the police uses whistles to alert each other instead of a siren.; Elephant Ride - Lulu and Alvin visit a circus, but Iggie, Eddie and Willie (by order of Tubby) sneaks backstage and scares off the elephant by popping a balloon. The elephant chases the children around.
30	4	"The Beast in the Clubhouse" "Gone Fishin'" "Out, Out, Darned Spot"	Christel Kleitsch Thomas LaPierre Thomas LaPierre	December 8, 1998
The Beast in the Clubhouse - The clubhouse is infested by a bird, who keeps on attacking the boys to keep them away from her nest.; Gone Fishin' - Lulu and Tubby go fishing. Lulu has a dream that a merman tries to eat her.; Out, Out, Darned Spot - Lulu and Tubby try to clean off a stain from the carpet, making a bigger mess than before.
31	5	"The Curse of the Thingamajig" "House Guest Blues" "The Monster Hunt"	Joseph Mallozzi Thomas LaPierre Paul Mullie	December 14, 1998
The Curse of the Thingamajig' - The story of the so-called cursed thingamajig.; House Guest Blues - Tubby is staying with the Moppets for the weekend and he causes the family some inconveniences.; The Monster Hunt - Tubby and Iggie see a mud monster. They get help from Lulu and Annie to try and catch it.
32	6	"Blackout" "Mind Your Manners" "To Tell the Tooth"	Stephen Ashton Anne-Marie Perrotta and Tean Schultz Joan Scott	December 15, 1998
Blackout - A snowstorm causes a blackout across the city.; Mind Your Manners - Tubby accidentally received an audio record of good manners, he tries to use it impress Gloria.; To Tell the Tooth - =Lulu has a loose tooth and she tells her friends. However her friends misheard her and this leads to a bunch of rumors.
33	7	"Spaced Out" "Switched at Birth" "The Great Outdoors"	Kim Segal Thomas LaPierre Elyse Friedman	December 21, 1998
Spaced Out - In a planetarium, Lulu and her friends go a space voyage, which turns out to be a space simulation experience.; Switched at Birth - Lulu with Tubby sees a woman in the market who looks just like her.; The Great Outdoors - Lulu and her friends have a camp out in her backyard. Tubby and his friends try to ruin their fun.
34	8	"Bowlfinger" "Great Tubbini" "Shiny, Sheeny, Bouncy-Cleany"	David Hamburg and Mitchell Goldsmith Joseph Mallozzi Joseph Mallozzi	December 22, 1998
Bowlfinger - Lulu and Annie bet Tubby and Iggie in a bowling game. Tubby gets his fingers stuck in a bowling ball.; Great Tubbini - Tubby dresses up as a fortune teller.; Shiny, Sheeny, Bouncy-Cleany - Lulu with Annie creates a new shampoo to clean pet hair.
35	9	"Polly Patrol" "Money Problems" "The Tubby 2000"	Caroline Maria Shaun Lyng Kristine Van Dusen	December 27, 1998
Polly Patrol - Mrs. Feeny asks Lulu to take care of her pet parrot but it runs away.; Money Problems - Wilbur's family are losing money.; The Tubby 2000 - Tubby decides to sell a house cleaning robot that Lulu made for a science fair.
36	10	"No Pain, No Gain" "On the Job" "Tragic Magic"	Anne-Marie Perrotta and Tean Schultz Stephen Ashton Gerard Lewis	December 28, 1998
No Pain, No Gain - During a game of hockey, Tubby pretends to injure his leg and has Lulu do some favours for him.; On the Job - On career day, Lulu becomes a news reporter.; Tragic Magic - Tubby and Lulu performs in a magic show.
37	11	"First-Aid Brigade" "Matinee Madness" "It's a Dog's Life"	Joseph Mallozzi Brian Cameron Fuld Caroline Maria	January 4, 1999
First-Aid Brigade - Lulu and Annie along with the other members of the squirrel scouts try to earn their first-aid patch.; Matinee Madness - Lulu and Tubby work at a movie theater.; It's a Dog's Life - Tubby has to take care of his Aunt Martha's dog. He gives it to Lulu to take care of it.
38	12	"Lulu Stays Put" "Shoeless Lulu" "Star Search"	Bruce Robb Michael F. Hamill Ian James Corlett	January 5, 1999
Lulu Stays Put - Lulu overhears her mother and thinks she is going to sell her house. Lulu tries to stop her by scaring away the potential buyers.; Shoeless Lulu - There are new shoes in the market that are the latest fad, the problem is that everyone has them except Lulu.; Star Search - A television executive is looking for someone to star in a commercial and Lulu and various other kids want to join.
39	13	"The Untold Story" "Amok in the Mall" "The World Record"	Kim Segal Rick Jones and John Handforth Ian James Corlett	January 11, 1999
The Untold Story - Alvin gets a story telling session by Tubby.; Amok in the Mall - Lulu and Annie take Alvin to the barber. But problems occur when he runs away.; The World Record - Lulu desperately tries to break a world record. Ultimately breaking the records of the most unsuccessful attempts of breaking records.
40	14	"Breakout" "The Great Golf Club Chase!" "Jumpin' Jellybeans"	Thomas LaPierre Joseph Mallozzi Alister McAlister and Stewart Silver	January 12, 1999
Breakout - Marty the Midget escapes from prison again.; The Great Golf Club Chase! - Lulu and Tubby accidentally get rid of Mr. Moppet's golf equipment and hastily get it back in time for Mr. Moppet's golf play.; Jumpin' Jellybeans - Lulu and friends take part in a contest involving jellybeans.
41	15	"Iggy and the Ice Cream Factory" "Game Show Gaffe" "Art Frenzy"	Jacques Bouchard Joseph Mallozzi Anne-Marie Perrotta and Tean Schultz	January 17, 1999
Iggy and the Ice Cream Factory - Iggie's idea gets selected as a new flavor by an ice cream company.; Game Show Gaffe - Lulu's father enters in a game show.; Art Frenzy - Lulu's class goes on a field trip to an art museum.
42	16	"Order in the Court" "Maybe Use Sugar" "Road Trip"	Stephen Ashton Thomas LaPierre Kim Segal	January 18, 1999
Order in the Court - Lulu's class holds a trial in order to find who broke Iggy's ukulele.; Maybe Use Sugar - Annie's mother is not a very good cook and Annie is worried that she might wreck the bake sale.; Road Trip - Lulu tells her school class a story about her summer road trip vacation in a Recreational vehicle, with Tubby spoiling Mr. Moppet's relaxation.
43	17	"Bicycle Built for Too Many" "Tax Time Trouble" "Mayor for a Day"	Shaun Lyng Natalie Dumoulin Anne-Marie Perrotta and Tean Schultz	January 24, 1999
Bicycle Built for Too Many - Someone stole Tubby's bicycle and he believes that Butch of The West Side Boys stole it after seeing him use a similar bike.; Tax Time Trouble - Wilbur's mother hosts a charity event.; Mayor for a Day - Lulu is appointed as the Mayor of the city for a day.
44	18	"Hooky Holiday" "Red Tape Run-Around" "Country Clubby Tubby"	Gerard Lewis Michael F. Hamill Paul Mullie	January 25, 1999
Hooky Holiday - Lulu and Tubby decide to skip school.; Red Tape Run-Around - Lulu fails her career aptitude test, she goes to the authority to report the mistake.; Country Clubby Tubby - Tubby wins a million dollars and Wilbur invites him to a country club.
45	19	"Dancin' Fools" "Hop Hazard" "Stage Fright"	Paul Mullie Natalie Dumoulin Stephen Ashton	January 31, 1999
Dancin' Fools - The school holds a dance contest.; Hop Hazard - Lulu and Annie take home a rabbit but trouble soon starts when it begins to multiply.; Stage Fright - Lulu directs a play, with her friends as cast members.
46	20	"The Unnatural" "The People's Choice" "SuperLulu"	Anne-Marie Perrotta and Tean Schultz Barbara Bryan and Paul Mullie Lienne Sawatsky and Elana Devine	February 1, 1999
The Unnatural - A new kid joins the school soccer team.; The People's Choice - Lulu goes up against Wilbur in the school election.; SuperLulu - Lulu imagines herself as a superhero, with her sidekick Annie and Tubby as the villain who has taken over every TV channel that broadcast programs starring Tubby himself.
47	21	"Tubby Kicks the Habit" "How the West Was Lost" "Infomercial"	Jason Bogdaneris and Sarah Musgrave Natalie Dumoulin Kim Segal	February 2, 1999
Tubby Kicks the Habit - Tubby makes a bet with Lulu that he can go a week without TV.; How the West Was Lost - Lulu wins a trip to the Wild West; unfortunately Annie is so allergic to horses that she can't even watch a western movie without breaking into a rash, so the only option left is Tubby.; Infomercial - Lulu and Tubby go to see an infomercial about exercising and health products.
48	22	"Bulldozer Blues" "Telethon of Fallen Stars" "What's Fair Is Fare"	Sarah Musgrave and Jason Bogdaneris Paul Mullie Natalie Dumoulin	February 7, 1999
Bulldozer Blues - Construction workers plan to destroy Tubby's clubhouse and build a building over it.; Telethon of Fallen Stars - Lulu's soccer team must sell cookies in order to enter the national championships. Lulu and her friends host a telethon to raise money.; What's Fair Is Fare - Lulu's class holds a fair in order to raise money.
49	23	"Malpractice Makes Perfect" "Involuntary Volunteers" "Mobile Masterpiece"	Gerard Lewis Kim Segal Kristine Van Dusen	February 8, 1999
Malpractice Makes Perfect - Tubby gets a splinter and believing it's infected, goes to the hospital.; Involuntary Volunteers - For school's volunteer week, Lulu and Tubby help an old lady.; Mobile Masterpiece - Wilbur's father orders his butler, Cranberry, to get rid of his wife's Elvis painting. However he must get it back after his wife gets upset.
50	24	"Castaway Kids" "Wrestling Away" "Never Too Late"	Stephen Ashton Michael F. Hamill Natalie Dumoulin	February 14, 1999
Castaway Kids - Lulu and Tubby along with Annie and Iggie head to an island for a picnic but they get stranded on it.; Wrestling Away - Tubby becomes a professional wrestler.; Never Too Late - Lulu's friends are busy reading a book for a test and she tries many ways to get out of reading it.
51	25	"Tubby on Ice" "Dr. X's Xtremely Xcellent X-Ray Specs" "Iggie's New Leaf"	Paul Mullie Jacques Bouchard Sarah Musgrave and Jason Bogdaneris	February 15, 1999
Tubby on Ice - When sledding down dead man's rock, Tubby becomes buried in snow and wakes up in the future.; Dr. X's Xtremely Xcellent X-Ray Specs - Tubby tricks Alvin into trading a rare card for a pair of glasses that supposedly give X-ray vision.; Iggie's New Leaf - Iggie's mother threatens to send him to military school unless he learns to stay out of trouble.
52	26	"You Do the Math" "The Great Escape" "The Little Lola Show"	Paul Mullie Kim Segal and Daryl Brown Paul Mullie	February 21, 1999
You Do the Math - Lulu gains a mysterious calculation power enabling her to go through math quizzes successfully.; The Great Escape - Tubby's gang and Lulu try to get their hockey champion Arlin out of detention, but land themselves in trouble.; The Little Lola Show - Lulu and her friends work at the TV studio to produce the Little Lola Show sitcom, but it gets cancelled.
