= Bill Schelly =

American author and historian (1951–2019)

- Born: William Carl Schelly; November 2, 1951; Walla Walla, Washington, U.S.
- Died: September 12, 2019 (aged 67)
- Education: University of Idaho
- Occupation: Author
- Website: billschelly.net

William Carl Schelly (November 2, 1951 – September 12, 2019) was an Eisner Award-winning author who chronicled the history of comic books and comic book fandom, and wrote biographies of comic book creators, including Otto Binder, L.B. Cole, Joe Kubert, Harvey Kurtzman, John Stanley, and James Warren as well as silent film comedian Harry Langdon.

== Early life ==
Bill Schelly was born in Walla Walla, Washington, and had been a comic book enthusiast since 1960. He was living in a suburb of Pittsburgh, Pennsylvania when he heard about comics fandom in 1964. Upon seeing his first amateur publication about comics, a mimeographed fanzine called Batmania, Schelly decided to become a fanzine publisher himself. He launched Super-Heroes Anonymous in February 1965, the first in a string of magazines he edited and published until 1972.

It was for his fanzine Sense of Wonder that Schelly became known to the comics community. Begun while living in Pittsburgh, but mostly published after he moved to Lewiston, Idaho, in 1967, it began as a collection of amateur comic strips and stories. In 1970, while attending the University of Idaho, Schelly changed the format of Sense of Wonder to a "general fanzine" made up of articles and artwork about the history of comic books. By the end of its 12-issue run, Sense of Wonder had presented the first attempt to chronicle the whole career of comics innovator Will Eisner, as well as work by Steve Ditko, Frank Frazetta and Stanley Pitt. It was discontinued after he graduated from the University of Idaho with a B.S. in education in 1973.

== Writing ==
In 1990, Schelly began researching the history of the classic era of comic book fandom. Eventually, his research culminated in a book-length manuscript called The Golden Age of Comic Fandom It was well-received, quickly sold out, and was nominated for a Will Eisner Comic Industry Award. A revised and expanded edition was published in 1998, and another printing was done in 2003.

== Awards ==
Schelly won a Inkpot Award at San Diego Comic-Con for Fandom Services in 2011 and the 2016 Eisner Award for Best Comics-Related Book for his biography, Harvey Kurtzman: The Man Who Created Mad and Revolutionized Humor in America (Fantagraphics Books, 2015)

== Death ==
Bill Schelly died September 12, 2019, due to blood clotting in the lungs during chemotherapy for his recently diagnosed multiple myeloma.

== Bibliography ==
- Harry Langdon (Scarecrow Press, 1982)
- The Golden Age of Comic Fandom (Hamster Press, 1995)
- (with Roy Thomas) Alter Ego: The Best of the Legendary Comics Fanzine (Hamster Press, 1997; re-issued by TwoMorrows Publishing in 2008)
- Fandom's Finest Comics Vol. 1 (Hamster Press, 1997)
- Fandom's Finest Comics Vol. 2 (Hamster Press, 1998)
- Giant Labors of Love (Hamster Press, 2000)
- Sense of Wonder: A Life in Comic Fandom (TwoMorrows Publishing, 2001)
- Comic Fandom Reader (Hamster Press, 2002)
- The Best of Star-Studded Comics (Hamster Press, 2005)
- Words of Wonder: The Life and Times of Otto Binder (Hamster Press, 2003)
- Man of Rock: A Biography of Joe Kubert (Fantagraphics Books, 2008)
- Harry Langdon: His Life and Films (substantially revised and appended second edition, McFarland, 2008)
- Founders of Comic Fandom: Profiles of 90 Publishers, Dealers, Collectors, Writers, Artists and Other Luminaries of the 1950s and 1960s (McFarland Books, 2010)
- The Art of Joe Kubert (Fantagraphics Books, 2011)
- Weird Horrors and Daring Adventures (Fantagraphics Books, 2012)
- (with Roy Thomas) The Best of Alter Ego, Vol. 2 (TwoMorrows Publishing, 2013)
- American Comic Book Chronicles: The 50s (TwoMorrows Publishing, 2013)
- Black Light: The World of L.B. Cole (Fantagraphics Books, 2015)
- Harvey Kurtzman: The Man Who Created Mad and Revolutionized Humor in America (Fantagraphics Books, 2015)
- Otto Binder: The Life and Work of a Comic Book and Science Fiction Visionary (North Atlantic Books, 2016)
- John Stanley: Giving Life To Little Lulu (Fantagraphics Books, 2017)
- Sense of Wonder, My Life in Comic Fandom--The Whole Story (North Atlantic Books, 2018)
- Bill Schelly Talks with the Founders of Comic Fandom, Vol. 1 (Pulp Hero Press)
- The Bill Schelly Reader: Collected Essays about Comic Books, Comic Fandom & James Bond (Pulp Hero Press, 2019)
- Come With Me (novel; Pulp Hero Press, 2019)
- James Warren, Empire of Monsters: The Man Behind Creepy, Vampirella, and Famous Monsters (Fantagraphics Books, 2019)
