= Luluzinha Teen e sua Turma =

Brazilian comic series (2009–2015)

- Cover of the first issue of Luluzinha Teen e sua Turma, art by Labareda Design

Publication information
- Publisher: Ediouro
- Format: Ongoing series
- Genre: Action/adventure, humor/comedy
- Publication date: June 2009 - February 2015
- No. of issues: 65

Creative team
- Written by: Renato Fagundes; Labareda Design

Luluzinha Teen e sua Turma (lit: Little Lulu Teen and her Gang) was a manga-style Brazilian comic based on the U.S. comic strip Little Lulu, from Marjorie Henderson Buell. It was launched in June 2009, a year after the launch of the Monica Teen series, which also adopts the manga style and is also inspired in a popular comic book, Monica's Gang.

In its early days was one of the best-selling comics in Brazil second only to those of Monica Teen. Nevertheless, the comics were canceled in 2015 due to low sales, reaching 65 issues released.

== Plot ==
The series shows the life of Little Lulu and her friends as 14-year-old high schoolers. The city in which the characters live is called Liberta. The five main protagonists in the story are Lulu, Tubby (Bolinha), Annie (Aninha), Gloria (Glorinha) and Alvin (Alvinho), remodeled as modern teenagers with very different personalities from those the original comics. Lulu is the heroine, always ready to solve cases and mysteries that occur at school or city. Tubby is aspiring rockstar, has a lean physique and dates several girls throughout the series. Annie is fascinated by technology and video games, being considered a geek. Gloria is the stereotype of a preppy obsessed by fashion and shopping, and now is a close friend of Lulu. Alvin is a rebellious preteen who enjoys extreme sports such as skateboarding and surfing.

== Characters ==
=== Main Characters ===
- Lulu (Luluzinha) - The class leader. In this series, she shows a secret crush on Tubby, but she can't muster the courage to confess it to him. She has a blog where she frequently posts interviews with celebrities who visit the city.
- Tubby (Bolinha / Bola) - Lulu's best male friend. In this series, he is portrayed as an aspiring rock star who is the leader of a rock band known as Loki (which serves as an equivalent to The Fellers) along with his boy friends. Unlike the original series, he is portrayed as being tolerable around girls and even dating or developing crushes on several of them throughout the series, although deep down he has a secret crush on Lulu.
- Annie (Aninha) - Lulu's best friend. In this series, she is portrayed as a geeky girl obsessed with technology, especially video games. At the beginning of the series, she is seen focusing on the online game Katana, but after the second arc, she is no longer seen playing this game.
- Gloria (Glorinha) - Lulu's second best friend. Unlike the original series where she was portrayed as Lulu's rival, in this series she is introduced having made peace with Lulu in the meantime, having grown up with Gloria frequently accompanying Lulu most of the time. She is portrayed as having divorced parents, as well as being obsessed with clothes and models.
- Alvin (Alvinho) - The youngest of the group, described as being two years younger than Lulu. In this series he is portrayed as a radical kid obsessed with surfing and skateboarding, having been influenced by his grandfather, Mr. Lauro, to pursue a career as a surfer. Initially, he studied at the same school as Lulu, but from the third arc onwards, he starts studying at the Rosseau boarding school.

=== Original Characters ===
- Vitor Vergerus - The main villain to appear in the series. A rich, evil, and corrupt businessman who considers himself an archenemy to Lulu and her grandmother. The son of a corrupt politician who abandoned him in childhood after being accused of fraud, he vowed revenge against the city for the loss of his father. He was the main antagonist of the first arc and had a few returns throughout the series.
- Alexandre and Felipe - Two boys who are friends of Tubby and Iggy and are members of the band Loki.
- Diana - An antagonistic classmate for Lulu and her friends. She behaves in a more snobbish, arrogant, and aggressive manner than Gloria, often going so far as to provoke and belittle others with insults and engaging in bad behavior such as stealing or blaming others.
- Mozz - Alvin's best friend. He was initially introduced as an arrogant boy and rival to Alvin, but quickly made peace with him. He initially attended iNova school, but began attending Rosseau alongside Alvin from the third arc onwards.
- Mr. Lauro - Alvin's grandfather. He is a surfer who has frequented Liberta beach since his youth and is largely responsible for influencing his grandson to take up the sport.
- Leon - A young man who works at the iNova school and is an ally of Lulu and her friends. He was one of the main characters during the first four arcs, initially showing romantic interest in Lulu and later serving as Gloria's boyfriend until they eventually break up at the end of the fourth arc due his actions and make rare appearances after that.
- Rosa - One of Lulu's classmates. During the first four arcs, she was the vocalist for the band Loki and also Tubby's girlfriend during the first two arcs. She even dates Iggy during the fourth arc in an attempt to get Tubby's attention again, but her actions end up getting her kicked out of the group.
- Lila - One of Alvin's friends. Just as Mozz was introduced as a student at iNova High School, having served as a love interest for Alvin during the first four arcs and having dated Bandit in the past. At the end of the fourth arc, Alvin breaks up with her because he thinks she wants to get back with Bandit.

== Differences from the original series ==
The most notable change in this series is that the characters now have personalities and appearances that are quite different from the originals. All the characters ended up with different hairstyles, with Tubby and Alvin becoming blonde and Wilbur with brown hair, except for Annie and Iggy who still have hairstyles similar to the original. Gloria notably had her role elevated, being portrayed as Lulu's second best friend, while characters like Iggy and Wilbur had their roles were drastically reduced and are never portrayed as protagonists. Willie and Eddie were initially removed from the series and replaced by two other boys named Alexandre and Felipe, who took over their roles as Tubby's other friends besides Iggy, with the excuse that they moved to another city, although they reappear in small appearances throughout the series. The series even makes mention of this in some issues, with the characters justifying the change in their appearances, such as Lulu saying that she depended on her mother to have her hair braided as a child and that her mother became too busy to do it as she grew up, or Annie claiming that she wore braces in the meantime to correct her teeth. All the characters from the original series have notably started behaving in a more likeable way, which is quite noticeable in Tubby, Gloria, Wilbur, and Butch, who have become more friendly and mature with each other or in front of Lulu. The characters also came to be portrayed as living in a fictional Brazilian city located in São Paulo called Liberta instead of being Americans living in Peekskill in New York.
