= Melvin Monster =

Dell Comics character

Melvin Monster is a 1960s satirical children's comic book character created by John Stanley and published by Dell Comics. Melvin first appeared in 1965. Nine issues were published on a semi-annual basis.

Melvin Monster is a green-skinned boy who lives in Monsterville. He attends the Little Black School House, where he is taught by Miss McGargoyle. His parents (Mummy and Baddy) are disappointed that he wants to be helpful. He has a pet crocodile, Cleopatra, who repeatedly tries to eat him.
