= Memo Aguirre =

Famous Chilean musician and singer (born 1952)

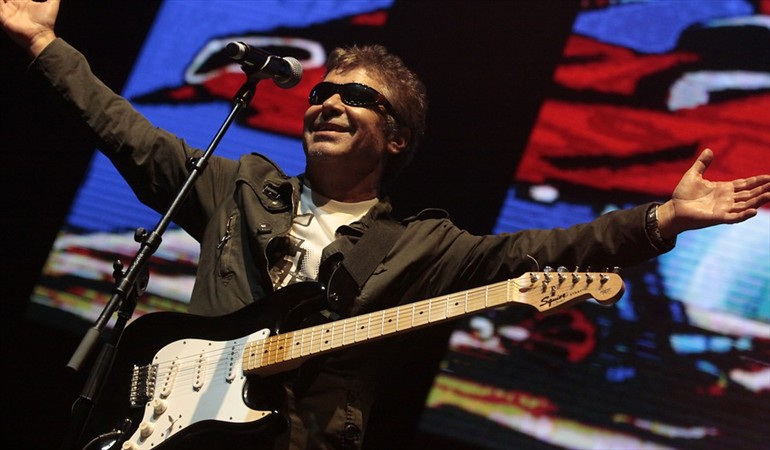
Memo Aguirre

Juan Guillermo Aguirre Mandiola (born December 22, 1952), better known as «Memo Aguirre» or «Capitán Memo», is a Chilean singer and musician famous for performing the opening and closing themes of several animated series during the 1970s and 1980s.

== Biography ==
Juan Guillermo Aguirre was born on December 22, 1952, in Santiago de Chile, his early musical career started during his adolescence when participated in the band named "Los Sacros", in 1972 Aguirre moved to the United States, setting in San Francisco, working as a singer in bars and nightclubs. Later he got a job in the company Sound Connection Studios. Aguirre during the 1970s and 1980s sung the opening and credits songs for cartoon and anime shows such as: He-Man, Captain Future, Steel Jeeg, Candy Candy, and Little Lulu, some of them in collaboration with the American Shuki Levy.

In addition to composing jingle for famous series such as Dallas and Dynasty, he also composed for albums by American performers such as Kenny Rogers, several of his songs are compiled in "Las grandes aventuras" and "La legión de los superhéroes" under the name of "Superbanda" (Superband). In 2004, under the artistic name of «Capitán Memo» (Captain Memo) he released "El Regreso de los Robots" (The Return of the Robots), a CD album which contains many old songs that were composed by him re-recorded the following year "Grand Prix" was released, equally credited to Capitan Memo.

== List of works ==
- 1973: Fables of the Green Forest (Siempre en el bosque)
- 1975: Steel Jeeg (El Vengador)
- 1975: Maya the Honey Bee (La abeja Maya)
- 1976: Gaiking (El Gladiador)
- 1976: Magne Robo Gakeen (Supermagnetrón)
- 1976: Time Bokan (La Máquina del Tiempo)
- 1976: Little Lulu (La Pequeña Lulú)
- 1978: Captain Future (Capitán Futuro)
- 1978: Starzinger (El Galáctico)
- 1979: Lulu, The Flower Angel (Ángel, la niña de las flores)
- 1979: Josephina the Whale (La Ballena Josefina)
- 1979: Spider-Woman (Mujer Araña)
- 1979: King Arthur (TV series) (Rey Arturo)
- 1980: Zukkoke Knight: Don De La Mancha (Don Quijote y los Cuentos de la Mancha)
- 1983: He-Man and the Masters of the Universe (He-Man y los amos del Universo)

== Discography ==
as Superbanda

- La Pequeña Lulú (1981)
- Las grandes aventuras (1981)
- La legión de los superhéroes (1981)

as Capitán Memo

- El regreso de los robots (2004)
- Grand Prix (2005)
