= Irving Tripp =

American comic book artist

- Born: Irving Tripp; June 5, 1921 Poughkeepsie, New York
- Died: November 27, 2009 (aged 88) Haines City, Florida
- Areas: Artist, Inker
- Pseudonyms: Bud, Poppy
- Notable works: Little Lulu

Irving Rose Tripp (June 5, 1921 – November 27, 2009), was an American comic book artist, best known as the illustrator of Little Lulu comics.

Irving was born in 1921 in Poughkeepsie, New York. He began working in comics in 1941 when he joined Dell Comics as a staff artist. He helped to produce approximately a half-dozen issues of Four Color before leaving to join the U.S. Army during World War II, where he served in the Philippines.

He returned to work at Dell Comics in 1946 and remained there as a valued staff artist until his retirement in 1982. In 1949, he began working with Little Lulu writer John Stanley when the success of the early comic books called for a more rigorous publishing schedule than Stanley was capable of meeting.

Tripp also worked on a number of other comic books during his four decades at Dell. He inked comic book version of Tom and Jerry and Bugs Bunny. He also aided in illustrating a number of Disney adaptations, most memorably Dumbo. He provided much of the art work in the Clyde Crashcup #1 comic published by Dell.

On November 27, 2009, Tripp died from complications from cancer in Lakeland, Florida.

== See also ==
- Little Lulu
- John Stanley
