= Little Lulu and Her Little Friends =

Japanese anime television series

- リトル・ルルとちっちゃい仲間
- Based on: Little Lulu by Marjorie Henderson
- Screenplay by: Fumi Takahashi
- Directed by: Fumio Kurokawa
- Music by: Nobuyoshi Koshibe
- Country of origin: Japan
- Original language: Japanese
- No. of episodes: 26

Production
- Producer: Seitaro Kodama
- Production companies: Asahi Broadcasting; Nippon Animation

Original release
- Network: ANN (ABC, NET/TV Asahi)
- Release: October 3, 1976 – April 3, 1977

Little Lulu and Her Little Friends (リトル・ルルとちっちゃい仲間, Ritoru Ruru to Chitchai Nakama) is a Japanese anime television series produced by Nippon Animation, based on the Little Lulu comic by American cartoonist Marjorie Henderson Buell (Marge). The series was animated and directed by Fumio Kurokawa.

== Plot ==
The series follows the everyday adventures of Little Lulu, Tubby, and the rest of their friends. The most prominent themes derived from the comics include the boys vs. girls rivalry, Tubby's clubhouse, and mishaps with the troublemaking Westside Gang.

== Cast ==
- Lulu: Eiko Masuyama (episodes 1–3), Minori Matsushima (episodes 4-26)
- Tubby: Keiko Yamamoto
- Wilbur: Noriko Ohara
- Iggy: Yoneko Matsukane
- Annie: Junko Hori
- Alvin: Sachiko Chijimatsu
- Martha: Noriko Ohara
- George: Masayuki Katō
- Putchy: Hiroshi Masuoka
- Floory: Mahito Tsujimura
- Willie: Yuko Mita

== International broadcasting ==
The TV series was produced by Nippon Animation, and aired on ABC and NET from October 3, 1976, to April 3, 1977, in Japan. Their opening theme "Homonymous" and ending theme "I'm Lulu!" were written by Miko Kayama, composed by Nobuyoshi Koshibe, and performed by Mitsuko Horie. Little Lulu was also dubbed in Greek, Italian, German, Hebrew, Arabic, Spanish, and Brazilian Portuguese.

=== English versions ===
An English dub of the anime was made by ZIV International in 1978, and Mark Mercury composed the opening score, while the opening and credits sequence consisted of scenes taken from episodes. The on-screen English title for the series was simply Little Lulu, while its VHS releases were titled The Adventures of Little Lulu and Tubby in the United States, and The Adventures of Little Lulu in the UK.

In 1985, Harmony Gold produced another English dub, changing the voice cast, the opening sequence was kept and the ending sequence was changed, but the Mercury composition was intact.

=== Italian versions ===
Two dubs were produced in Italy, the first one was in 1981. This dub is currently lost. In this same year, Heritage Cinematografica produced a film for Italian cinemas that used several of the episodes of the television program, in addition to replacing the music of Mercury, and the opening and ending theme was changed to one composed of Cesare Regazzoni and Massimo Chiodi. In 2010 EMI Film released the film on DVD. The second dub was done by SD Cinematografica in 1995, using the Mercury soundtrack.

=== Spanish versions ===
In 1972, the Chilean musician Juan Guillermo Aguirre known as Memo Aguirre (and Capitán Nemo) emigrated to United States, settling in San Francisco and dedicating himself to being a singer in bars and discos. Later he was given a job at the Sound Connections Studios company and dedicated himself to the interpretation of musical themes in Spanish from various cartoons from the 70s and 80s, being credited as "Superbanda" (Superband). These included Little Lulu and Her Little Friends, replacing the Mercury theme.

== Episodes ==
No.	Title (Note: Bolded episode titles are translations from Japanese. Episodes without transliteration instead use the names found in the English ZIV/Harmony Gold home video releases.)	Original release date
1	"The Angel Kid" "Little Angel" (Japanese: ちびっこ天使)	October 3, 1976
Hoping to become an angel, Lulu tries to help those in need, including Tubby, Alvin, Iggy, Annie, Wilbur and Snobbly. Most of her efforts, however, have the opposite effect.
2	"A Chaotic Babysitting Experience!" "Operation Babysitter" (Japanese: 大さわぎのおるすばん)	October 10, 1976
Mrs. Tompkins asks Lulu to babysit Tubby, much to his protest. The two exchange pranks by scaring each other, until Tubby's gang get the better of the both of them.
3	"Good Luck, Watchman!" "Good Luck Guard" (Japanese: がんばれ見はり番)	October 17, 1976
Lulu is appointed to guard Tubby's club house, but sends them false alarms. She then smashes up the club house after they broke a promise they made to her.
4	"Hunger Race" "The Endurance Test" (Japanese: 腹ぺこレース)	October 24, 1976
Lulu and her friends are taking part in a Survival Fasting course for their camping trip, which Tubby is not confident to try, so he makes some secret food stashes. Lulu thwarts his attempts, but Tubby wins the course fair and square.
5	"Save the Prisoners"; Transliteration: "Horyo o Sukuidase" (Japanese: 捕虜をすくいだせ)	October 31, 1976
The West Side Boys capture Tubby and eventually all of his gang, while Lulu's efforts to release them do not work. She is able to keep the West Side Boys busy with her rollerskating antics, as Tubby and the gang make their hasty exit.
6	"Lulu Rides a Fire Truck" "Little Fireman" (Japanese: 消防車に乗ったルル)	November 7, 1976
Lulu tries to impress the boys by forming her own fire brigade, but their efforts are counter-productive. Tubby tricks Lulu into getting stranded in a tree, which becomes her ticket to riding the fire engine.
7	"The Winner of the Kids' Race"; Transliteration: "Chibi-kko Rēsu no Yūshō-sha" (Japanese: ちびっ子レースの優勝者)	November 14, 1976
The kids are preparing for a soapbox derby, but a wrench is thrown into Lulu and Annie's plans to remodel a baby doll carriage into a racer.
8	"Looking for Pirate Treasure" "The Treasure Hunt" (Japanese: 海賊の宝さがし)	November 21, 1976
Tubby and the fellers play pirates and dig a hole to bury their treasure. When Lulu and Annie are set up to go and find it, Tubby moves the goalposts like always.
9	"Stop Fighting!"; Transliteration: "Nakatagai wa Yamero" (Japanese: 仲たがいはやめろ)	November 28, 1976
Tubby and the fellers get into trouble with the West Side Boys, but Lulu, ever the negotiator, finds a way for them to make up through playing cowboys and Indians.
10	"A Most Troublesome Doll"; Transliteration: "Hito Sawagasena Ningyō" (Japanese: 人さわがせな人形)	December 5, 1976
Tubby receives a baby doll as a gift, and gives it to Lulu since he doesn't want it. However, Mrs. Tompkins expects her boy to take advantage of a gift, and a big switcheroo plot ensues.
11	"It's Tough to Put a Smile on a Face!"; Transliteration: "Nikoniko Kao wa Tsurai yo" (Japanese: にこにこ顔はつらいよ)	December 12, 1976
Wilbur invites the kids over to his family's mansion, but cause too much trouble and are barred from visiting. When Wilbur gets sick, Lulu, Tubby, and the gang hatch a plan to send their get-well wishes in-person.
12	"Get Rid of the Butler!"; Transliteration: "Shitsuji o Oidase!" (Japanese: 執事を追い出せ!)	December 19, 1976
When Wilbur's family butler, Snobbly, falls ill, an interim takes his place, Mr. Strong, who proves to be too mean for Wilbur and his friends to have fun. Naturally, the kids get their due.
13	"The Beautiful Lady Spy"; Transliteration: "Utsukushī On'na Supai" (Japanese: 美しい女スパイ)	December 26, 1976
Tubby and the fellers are stuck in a snowfort battle with the West Side Boys, and won't let Lulu join on it being strictly a boys' affair. In retaliation, Lulu joins in disguise as a heavily-bundled-up boy.
14	"Funny Bunny Hunting" "Looking For Rabbits" (Japanese: へんなうさぎ狩り)	January 9, 1977
Butch of the West Side Boys steals Lulu's bunny as a target for their hunting. It's up to Lulu and Tubby to get it back, all the while Mr. and Mrs. Moppett fix up dinner.
15	"Chase the Mud Cake!"; Transliteration: "Doro no Kēki o Oe!" (Japanese: 泥のケーキを追え!)	January 16, 1977
The gang are enamored with a local baker's cakes, but can't look through the window because of the West Side Boys' pestering. Tubby manages to get himself some, but with his archenemies on his tail, Lulu boxes up one of her famous mudpies in identical packaging, leading to mass confusion amongst the kids.
16	"Girls are Most Welcome"; Transliteration: "On'nanoko wa Dai Kangei" (Japanese: 女の子は大歓迎)	January 23, 1977
When Tubby excludes Lulu, Annie, and Gloria from "guys' stuff", including the clubhouse, the girls get even with the West Side Boys' help to teach their friends a lesson about masculinity and femininity.
17	"A Tree Falls Ill"; Transliteration: "Ki ga Byōki ni Na~tsu Chatta" (Japanese: 木が病気になっちゃった)	January 30, 1977
When Lulu finds the gang playing on a sapling, she tells them off, as trees are living beings too. After a prank where the tree is uprooted, Lulu plants the sapling in her yard, but trouble ensues as the kids bake a cake commemorating the planting.
18	"Snack Chase!"; Transliteration: "O Yatsu o Oikakero" (Japanese: おやつを追いかけろ)	February 6, 1977
After the West Side Boys release an old lady's pet parrot, Lulu and Tubby play detective to bring home birdie, while keeping the West Side Boys on their toes with decoys and tricks.
19	"School Starts Today!"; Transliteration: "Kyō Kara Gakkō" (Japanese: きょうから学校)	February 13, 1977
The first day of the school year is starting for the kids, and Lulu is eager to step into education with all her friends by her side. Unfortunately, Tubby isn't ready to face learning just yet, and the others have the problem of getting to class on time.
20	"The Paint War"; Transliteration: "Penki Sensō" (Japanese: ペンキ戦争)	February 20, 1977
A tag war breaks out between Lulu's girls and Tubby's fellers, with their territory being painted all over. The girls call on the help of the West Side Boys, but get into trouble with the police.
21	"Break the Violin!"; Transliteration: "Baiorin o Kowase" (Japanese: バイオリンをこわせ)	February 27, 1977
Lulu and Tubby hate their music lessons, but Tubby especially can't stand practicing violin. After running away from home and trying to flatten his strings, problem after problem befalls Tubby.
22	"Party Animals"; Transliteration: "Mōjū Pāti" (Japanese: 猛獣パーティ)	March 6, 1977
Wilbur invites the gang over for his birthday party, but the West Side Boys dirty them before they arrive. Once cleaned up, Snobbly and Wilbur surprise them with a trip to the mansion's taxidermy room after some brief misbehaving.
23	"We're Headed Off to Mars!"; Transliteration: "Kasei Ryokō e Shuppatsu!" (Japanese: 火星旅行へ出発!)	March 13, 1977
Lulu finds Alvin in the park playing spaceman, with Tubby challenging the two that he can build a real rocket to Mars. Of course, this is all a prank, but Lulu knows the best way to get back at Tubby is with his own weapons.
24	"The Dirt-Digging Competition"; Transliteration: "Tsuchi Hori Kyōsō" (Japanese: 土ほり競争)	March 20, 1977
Tubby's delusions of grandeur are tested when Lulu and the girls trick him and the West Side Boys into digging for oil, but a water main breaks in the shuffle.
25	"A Big Fuss Over a Turkey!"; Transliteration: "Shichimenchō de Dai Sawagi" (Japanese: 七面鳥で大さわぎ)	March 27, 1977
Lulu really wants a puppy from the pet store, but manages to get herself a pet turkey instead. When the bird causes too much trouble for her parents and friends, Lulu must learn the importance of livestock, even if she has to give up her Tom.
26	"Mama's Birthday"; Transliteration: "Mama no Tanjōbi" (Japanese: ママの誕生日)	April 3, 1977
Mrs. Moppett's birthday is today, and Lulu wants to give her mom a taste of the country. When the groceries are low, a trip to the farm teaches her about where dairy, meats, and eggs come from to make her mom a belated breakfast-in-bed.
