= John Stanley (cartoonist) =

American cartoonist (1914–1993)

- Stanley at NewCon in 1976
- Born: March 22, 1914 Harlem, New York City, U.S.
- Died: November 11, 1993 (aged 79) Sleepy Hollow, New York, U.S.
- Areas: Cartoonist, Writer
- Notable works: Little Lulu
- Awards: Inkpot Award; Will Eisner Hall of Fame; Bill Finger Award

John Stanley (March 22, 1914 – November 11, 1993) was an American cartoonist and comic book writer, best known for writing Little Lulu comic book stories from 1945 to 1959. While mostly known for scripting, Stanley also drew many of his stories, including the earliest issues of Little Lulu and its Tubby spinoff series. His specialty was humorous stories, both with licensed characters and those of his own creation. His writing style has been described as employing "colorful, S. J. Perelman-ish language and a decidedly bizarre, macabre wit (reminiscent of writer Roald Dahl)", with storylines that "were cohesive and tightly constructed, with nary a loose thread in the plot". He has been compared to Carl Barks, and cartoonist Fred Hembeck has dubbed him "the most consistently funny cartoonist to work in the comic book medium". Captain Marvel co-creator C. C. Beck remarked, "The only comic books I ever read and enjoyed were Little Lulu and Donald Duck".

== Biography ==
John Stanley was born March 22, 1914. Details about Stanley's early years are unclear. He had an older sister Marion, two younger brothers, Thomas and James and a younger sister, Marguerite. He received a scholarship to attend art classes at Textile High School in Chelsea, Manhattan. Fellow student and future comic book artist Gill Fox when interviewed by Alter Ego magazine reminisced about Stanley "You wouldn't believe how good his work was at 16—as good as most professionals today." There are also references to his attending an institution known variously as the New York School of Design or School of Art. Afterward he began working at Fleischer Studios as an opaquer and eventually in-betweening.

Stanley left Fleischer's studio in 1935 to work for Hal Horne, contributing artwork to the then just starting Mickey Mouse Magazine (3rd series). From there he went to work on Disney merchandise art for Kay Kamen, while selling gag cartoons to various magazines (including The New Yorker). In this period (1935–37) Don Phelps in his piece for the 1976 New Con program book notes that Stanley attended classes in lithography at the Art Students League of New York. Stanley then started working as a freelancer out of the east coast office of Western Publishing under editor Oskar Lebeck in 1943. Stanley during this time did stories for a range of characters, including Bugs Bunny, Raggedy Ann and Andy, Woody Woodpecker and Andy Panda, along with his own creations such as Peterkin Pottle and Jigg & Mooch. His scripting was done much like a storyboard in animation, with rough drawings to guide the artists and the dialogue in balloons.

Stanley was respected by his peers. Artist Dan Noonan who was a contemporary at Western Publishing during the 1940s in an interview stated that Stanley was, “one of the few truly capable and funny writers in the business. His stuff, the ideas he sent to The New Yorker, for example, I would say had as high a sales percentage as anything from anyone in their history... And an omnivorous reader, always. He reads everything he can lay his hands on. I'd say he's an authority on writers like Samuel Pepys and Boswell. He has a very strange, wonderful feel for words.” Walt Kelly as an in-joke in an Oswald the Rabbit one-shot (Four Color #102, 1946) has a pirate refer to a cannon that "in 1927 wouldn't say anything but 'John Stanley'—she's fickle"

Calling his story for Raggedy Ann and Andy #38 (July 1949) a classic, Maggie Thompson opined "Until John Stanley took over the Raggedys, they were a cheery duo whose adventures demonstrated that loving kindness was the attitude of choice. Suddenly, their world is a dark, unsettling place that is the equal of any nightmare: in this case, a castle that is an endless maze of despair. Yikes!"

Stanley and his wife Barbara had two children, Lynda, and James (born in 1962).

== Little Lulu ==
Modest about his talent, Stanley claimed it was utter chance that he was selected to bring panel cartoon character Little Lulu to comics: "Oscar [Lebeck] handed me the assignment, but I'm sure it was due to no special form of brilliance that he thought I'd lend to it. It could have been handed to Dan Noonan, [Walt] Kelly, or anyone else. I just happened to be available at the time". Stanley had one meeting with Lulu creator Marjorie Henderson Buell (known professionally as Marge) before doing the first issue to discuss the background of the character. While Marge continued to exercise oversight of the comics this was the sole time she directly gave input regarding the depiction of her creation in comic books. Stanley drew the initial Lulu Four Color one shots but once a regular series began in 1948 (for the first year bi-monthly then thereafter monthly) Irving Tripp and Charles Hedinger (Tripp inking Hedinger before eventually assuming both duties) assumed the job of translating Stanley's sketch scripts into finished art. But Stanley continued to do the covers (and perhaps due to deadlines drew the majority of Little Lulu #31 [1951]). The only time Stanley received credit was Little Lulu #49 (July 1952) where a box at the bottom of the inside front cover listed him as being among the staff writers and illustrators who worked on the issue; it also gives Stanley a separate credit for the front cover.

Whereas the old Saturday Evening Post panels depicted the humorous antics of a mischievous tomboy, Stanley quickly expanded the cast of characters in Lulu's universe to an entire neighborhood of children while sketching out rich characterizations that captured as Don Phelps noted "the mannerisms and slang" of kids. Many stories revolved around the competition between the boys and girls, often involving the club Tubby, Iggy and the other boys formed whose clubhouse bore the iconic sign "No Girls Allowed". Lulu and her friend Annie would often scheme to "teach the fellers a lesson", much to the shock of the boys who were firm in the belief of the superiority of their gender. However, in a fewer stories, Lulu and Annie's scheme would often backfire at them due to something that would ruin their plot, leaving the boys to have the upper hand. This battle of the sexes was highlighted by the boys' club celebrating the first Monday of each month as "mumday", when members were forbidden to speak to any of the girls (or even their own mothers). Shaenon Garrity notes "When not plotting against the girls, Tubby and his gang [would] mix it up with the much tougher West Side Gang".

Other stories related Tubby's exploits as The Spider, a detective who invariably accused Lulu's father as being the culprit of whatever he was investigating (and nearly invariably Mr. Moppet proved to be guilty). On occasion Lulu would be forced to avoid recurrent foil Truant Officer McNabbem, by means of "straight-up slapstick chases". And in flights of imagination Lulu would tell stories to a vexing young neighbor boy named Alvin, many of which involved an unnamed poor little girl (who looked just like Lulu) and her scary encounters with Witch Hazel and Hazel's niece Little Itch. Engrossed in her invention, Lulu would bring her narrative to an uproarious climax, only to discover that her unappreciative audience (Alvin) was nowhere to be seen, having taken advantage of Lulu's reverie to escape her company, leaving her to tell her story only to herself.

Stanley also wrote between 1952 and 1959 the four Four Color tryout issues (nos. 381, 430, 444 and 461) of the companion series Tubby plus the stories in the subsequent series through #35. Stanley scholar Frank Young notes Stanley's only sustained run doing artwork during the 1950s was for #2-9 of Tubby. The main artist on Tubby was Lloyd White, and per Young besides Tubby White also "pinch-hit" on the Lulu title, for example drawing some of the solo Tubby stories that appeared there.

== Post-Lulu career ==
Little Lulu #135, in early 1959, was Stanley's last, whereupon he began writing Nancy and Sluggo (titled Nancy for issues #146-173) starting with issue #162 and through at least #185, as well as several Dell Giant's (#34 & 45, and Nancy & Sluggo Traveltime). For this title he created the character Oona Goosepimple, who lived in a haunted house inhabited by weird relatives and mysterious little people known as Yoyos who hid behind the fireplace. While she only appeared in twenty issues(#162,166-178, 190-192 plus some Summer Camp Specials - Four Color #1034, Dell Giants #34 and #45) Oona has since attained something of a cult status. He also created Mr. McOnion, Sluggo's crabby neighbor. He also probably did the Nancy and Sluggo stories in Dell's Tip Top Comics #218-220, 222.

In the 1960s Stanley created a number of humorous titles for Dell Comics. These include:

- Kookie #1-2 1961–1962, drawn by Bill Williams. Kookie is a 20-something single girl living in a Greenwich Village-like environment with roommate Clara and working in a hip coffee shop. Supporting characters include Momma Poppa, the brash, overweight owner of the coffee shop, and Bongo and Bop and other beatniks. The subjects of their own back-of-the-book story, Bongo and Bop never interacted directly with Kookie.
- Around the Block with Dunc & Loo #1-8 1961–1963, humor with urban teens drawn by Bill Williams
- Thirteen (Going on Eighteen) #1-25 1961–1967, humor with suburban pre-teens drawn by Stanley starting with #3 [#26-29 reprints of #1-4]
- Melvin Monster #1-9 1965–1969, humorous horror drawn by Stanley [#10 reprints #1]

In a change of pace he also did the melodramatic medical/romance Linda Lark (#1-8 1961–1963) and two forays into straight horror:

- Tales From the Tomb, 1962 one-shot giant edited by L. B. Cole
- Ghost Stories #1, September.-November 1962 (Stanley wrote only the first issue)

Stanley also continued doing stories for licensed characters including Clyde Crashcup (#1-5, 1963–64) and Nellie the Nurse (Four Color #1304, 1962).

All of the foregoing were done for Dell Comics; when it and Western Publishing parted ways in 1962 Stanley was among the few creators who chose to stick with Dell.

Stanley did a one-page strip "Bridget and Her Little Brother Newton the Nuisance" for the unusual Wham-O Giant Comic Book (published in 1967).

During the 1950s and 1960s, Stanley also drew cartoon storyboards for various New York-based animation studios.

In 1965, his sole children's book was published by Rand McNally, It's Nice to be Little, with illustrations by Jean Tamburine. It sold well enough to warrant a second printing the following year.

Stanley's last works in comics were done for Gold Key: a 1969 one shot starring the Good & Plenty mascot Choo Choo Charlie, and in 1971 O.G. Whiz #1, featuring the adventures of a boy owning his own toy company. Both were scripted and drawn by Stanley.

== Later years ==
After leaving comic books, Stanley worked as the head of a silk screen company in upstate New York and in advertising for many years, and did cartoon illustration work for David C. Cook, a publisher of Christian-oriented books. In this period his marriage foundered and he moved out for an extended period.

Fans, including Don Phelps and Robert Overstreet, tracked Stanley down and began to publicize him in comics fandom. His first and only appearance at a fan gathering was at the 1976 New Con in Boston. Stanley was invited to be a guest at the 1977 Comic Art Convention and did attend. Despite some advance publicity listing him as a guest, he didn't attend the 1980 San Diego Comic-Con.

Later in life, Stanley did commissions of painted re-creations of classic Little Lulu and Tubby cover-gags. One of the last published pieces of artwork by him was a sketch that appeared in The Art of Mickey Mouse (1991).

Stanley died November 11, 1993, of esophageal cancer. His wife had died in 1990. His daughter, Lynda, is a photographic retoucher who has worked for numerous magazines and advertising agencies. His son, James, was an environmental consultant who later worked in computer graphic design and IT.

=== Legacy ===
Stanley's work on Little Lulu was #59 on Comics Journal's list of 100 top comics

Four of Stanley's Little Lulu stories were included in the 1981 collection A Smithsonian Book of Comic-Book Comics edited by Martin Williams and Michael Barrier. New York: Smithsonian Institution Press and Harry N. Abrams, 1981.

Stanley fandom eventually coalesced around John Merrill's fanzine The Stanley Steamer (1982–1992). The current outlet for Stanley fans is the infrequently issued fanzine the HoLLywood Eclectern edited by Ed Buchman. There is also a gathering commemorating Lulu and Stanley at the annual Comic-Con International organized by Buchman and Joan Appleton. This includes fans performing a radio-play style recreation of a classic Stanley Lulu story.

Author-comics scholar Frank M. Young is researching Stanley's authorship of stories published by Dell in various comics during the 1940s and 1950s, posting the results on a Stanley Stories blog he started in 2008 (from 2001 to 2005 he compiled a Stanley Stories website with a similar aim that ceased displaying in 2009 but whose content is slowly being incorporated into the blog).

Most of the segments on Cinar's The Little Lulu Show (broadcast on HBO from 1995 to 1999) were adaptations of Stanley's stories (without crediting him beyond stating the series was done "in association with Western Publishing".) Famous Studios in the early 1960s did two theatrical cartoons based on Stanley stories, reviving their Lulu series of the 1940s.

Comic book creator Pete Von Sholly has done a computer generated version of the Stanley story "The Monster of Dread End" and with permission of the Stanley family a new issue of Melvin Monster posted online.

The 2008 anthology The Mammoth Book of Best Horror Comics reprints Dread End, the original and Von Sholly's retelling.

"Hester's Little Pearl" is an adaptation of The Scarlet Letter with the novel's characters and the overall look drawn in the style of Lulu by Robert Sikoryak and published in Drawn & Quarterly Vol. 4 (2001). It was reprinted in the collection Masterprice Comics in late 2009.

The graphic novel Wimbledon Green by Seth contains an extended homage to Stanley.

A Stanley painting recreating a Lulu cover was featured as one of two covers offered for the 35th edition of the Overstreet Comic Book Price Guide (2005). The hard cover of the Lulu version sold out on the day the Guide was released. The soft cover version sold out two days later.

Another Rainbow's Little Lulu Library issued between 1985 and 1992 brought the Lulu stories to a new generation of readers. Among other things it published the landmark article, in its definitive form, by Brad Tenan that—based on clues in the stories—laid out the case for Lulu's hometown being modeled on Peekskill, New York, where Stanley lived for some years.

And in the current decade a series of Lulu trade paperbacks have been published by Dark Horse reprinting Stanley's stories.

Free Comic Book Day 2009 (May 2, 2009) included a John Stanley collection that included Nancy and Melvin Monster in a flipbook style. Free Comic Book Day 2010 (May 1, 2010) included a John Stanley collection that included Nancy, Tubby, Melvin Monster, Judy Junior, and Choo Choo Charlie - all of them spunky cartoon kids written (sometimes also drawn) by John Stanley.

Bill Schelly's John Stanley, Giving Life to Little Lulu published in May 2017 is the first book-length biography of Stanley, including never before known information about his family of origin, and quotes from the only known extensive interview ever given by the cartoonist (at the 1976 Boston Newcon), which had never been fully transcribed before.

=== Awards ===
- Inkpot Award in 1980 from San Diego Comic-Con
- Inducted in 2004 into the Will Eisner Hall of Fame
- 2015 Bill Finger Award

== Online comics ==
- links to scans of the legendary “The Monster Of Dread End”, from Ghost Stories #1
- a story with Oona Goosepimple from Nancy and Sluggo #175, March-April 1960
- Last of the Spinner Rack Junkies Has links to several Stanley stories from Dunc and Loo, Thirteen (Going on Eighteen) and Kookie #1.
- I'm Learning to Share! scans of selected pages from Kookie #2.

== Reprint collections ==
- Little Lulu Library (info) Six sets containing 18 hardbound volumes published between 1985 and 1992 by Another Rainbow; reprints in black and white the stories in Little Lulu (including one-shots) through #87 plus articles and historical background to the series.
- Dark Horse Little Lulu softcover collections 18 trade paperbacks published between 2004 and 2008 reprints in black and white the stories published in the Another Rainbow Little Lulu Library, sans articles and covers. One color special was also published. New volumes in color continuing the series (and now including the covers of the original comics) began appearing in 2009. In all Dark Horse issued twenty nine volumes collecting Stanley's entire run on the series, including Dell Giant specials. In addition four volumes collecting issues 1-24 of the companion Tubby title were published in 2010-2011 as Little Lulu's Pal Tubby.
- John Stanley Library Nine volumes from Drawn & Quarterly (2009-2013) collecting a sample of Stanley's non-Lulu series, including the entirety of Melvin Monster, the first nine issues of Thirteen (Going on Eighteen), Nancy/Nancy and Sluggo (#146-150, #167-177 plus Summer Camp Four Color #1034) and one volume of Tubby (containing issues #9-12); volumes designed by longtime Stanley devotee Seth.
  - Melvin Monster, 3 volumes (v1 ISBN 978-1-897299-63-0; v2 ISBN 978-1-77046-003-4; v3 ISBN 978-1-77046-030-0)
  - Nancy, 4 volumes (v1 ISBN 978-1-897299-77-7; v2 ISBN 978-1-897299-96-8; v3 ISBN 978-1-77046-050-8; v4 ISBN 978-1-770461-09-3)
  - Thirteen going on Eighteen, (v1 ISBN 978-1-897299-88-3)
  - Tubby, (v1 ISBN 978-1770460-23-2)
- Marge's Little Lulu A five volume hardcover series published by Drawn & Quarterly reprinting the classic Lulu stories written by Stanley in color, restored with historical background by co-editors D+Q Executive Editor Tom Devlin and Stanley scholar Frank M. Young.
  - v.1 Little Lulu: Working Girl [Nov. 2019] (reprints the initial five Four Color appearances of Lulu in comic books from 1945 to 1946 (#74, 97, 110, 115 and 120), the first three of which were written AND drawn by Stanley). ISBN 978-1-770463-65-3
  - v.2 Little Lulu: The Fuzzythingus Poopi [Sep. 2020] ISBN 978-1-770463-66-0
  - v.3 Little Lulu: The Little Girl Who Could Talk to Trees [Dec. 2021] ISBN 978-1-770463-89-9
- The TOON Treasury of Classic Children's Comics Collection of classic comic book stories for young children edited by Art Spiegelman and his wife, Françoise Mouly. Includes selections by Stanley, Carl Barks and Walt Kelly. (ISBN 0-8109-5730-2)
- Golden Collection of Krazy Kool Klassic Kids' Komics A kids comic book story collection (exclusively public domain) edited by Craig Yoe. Includes selections by Stanley, Barks, Kelly, Jack Kirby, Wally Wood and others. (ISBN 978-1600105203)
- The Great Treasury of Christmas Comic Book Stories edited by Craig Yoe. Includes selections by Stanley, Kelly, Richard Scarry and others. (ISBN 978-1684050093)
