= The Little Lulu Show =

Television series

- Genre: Comedy
- Based on: Little Lulu by Marjorie Henderson Buell
- Directed by: Greg Bailey; Louis Piché; Nick Rijgersberg
- Voices of: Tracey Ullman (season 1); Jane Woods (seasons 2–3)
- Theme music composer: Buddy Kaye; Sidney Lippman; Fred Wise
- Opening theme: "Little Lulu" performed by Richard Groulx
- Ending theme: "Little Lulu" (instrumental)
- Composer: Jeff Fisher
- Countries of origin: Canada; Germany (season 3)
- Original language: English
- No. of seasons: 3
- No. of episodes: 52 (156 segments) (list of episodes)

Production
- Executive producers: Micheline Charest; Nancy Steingard; Ronald A. Weinberg; Peter Völkle (season 3)
- Producers: Ronald A. Weinberg; Cassandra Schafhausen; Lesley Taylor
- Running time: 22 minutes (7 minutes per segment)
- Production companies: CINAR Corporation (Note: Known as CINAR Films for the first two seasons. Animation outsourced to Wang Film Productions (seasons 1–2) and AKOM (season 3).); TMO-Loonland Film GmbH (season 3)

Original release
- Network: CTV (Canada, seasons 1–2); Family Channel (Canada, season 3); HBO (United States, seasons 1–2); HBO Family (United States, season 3)
- Release: October 22, 1995 – February 21, 1999

The Little Lulu Show is an animated series based on Marjorie Henderson Buell's comic strip character Little Lulu. The series first aired in 1995 and ended in 1999.

The series was produced by the CINAR Corporation, in association with Western Publishing Company, Inc./Golden Books Family Entertainment, alongside HBO, Beta Film and the CTV Television Network Ltd. for the first two seasons, with the participation of The Cable Production Fund (Season 2) and the Family Channel (Season 3). For the third season, TMO-Loonland Film co-produced the series with CINAR.

== Plot ==
Quick-witted Lulu can outsmart boys, bullies and even grownups. Whether she is catching frogs for a local restaurant, treasure hunting or tracking down a thief, Lulu always has an ace up her sleeve. Together with her best friend Tubby, pint-sized Alvin, buck-toothed Annie, smooth Willie and the rest of the neighborhood gang, Lulu always finds herself in the middle of an adventure.

The series focuses on the life and adventures of Lulu Moppet (voiced by Tracey Ullman and later Jane Woods) and Tubby Tompkins. Between stories called LuluToon, they featured stand-up comedy that Lulu hosted and a series of musical shorts called Lulu-Bite is also shown. Each episode contains 3 sketches with the different stories, interspersed with a "stand up-comedy" presented by Lulu and 2 short 30-second introductions without speech, based on the last comic stories (with only 3 scenes).

Each storyline featured in the LuluToons is used from comic book releases (including John Stanley ones), with minor alterations.

The series is different from Little Lulu and Her Little Friends, a Japanese anime featuring the same characters made in 1976 and aired internationally in 1978.

== Broadcast ==
The series was aired on HBO and HBO Family in the United States and CTV in Canada. The series continued to air on Family Channel, Teletoon Retro (English and French), VRAK.TV, and TeleNiños (Spanish dub only). In foreign countries, the series is also aired on the Australian ABC (part of ABC for Kids), Rai 2, E-Junior, Cartoon Network and TV Globo.

== Episodes ==
Season	Segments	Episodes	Originally released	
Season	Segments	Episodes	First released	Last released
1	18	6	October 22, 1995	December 26, 1995
2	60	20	May 3, 1996	July 4, 1996
3	78	26	November 30, 1998	February 21, 1999

== Voice cast ==
Characters	Voice actors		
	Season 1 (1995)	Season 2 (1996)	Season 3 (1998-1999)
"Little" Lulu Moppet	Tracey Ullman	Jane Woods	Jane Woods
Thomas "Tubby" Tompkins	Bruce Dinsmore	Bruce Dinsmore	Bruce Dinsmore
Annie Inch	Michael Caloz	Michael Caloz	Vanessa Lengies
Iggie Inch	Jane Woods	Jane Woods	Dawn Ford
Willie Wilkins	Andrew Henry	Andrew Henry	Ricky Mabe
Eddie Stimson	Justin Bradley	Justin Bradley	Justin Bradley
Wilbur Van Snobbe	Jacob Tierney	Jacob Tierney	Jacob Tierney
Gloria Goode Darling	Angelina Boivin	Angelina Boivin	Angelina Boivin
Alvin Jones	Ajay Fry	Ajay Fry	Jonathan Koensgen
Mrs. Martha Moppet	Pauline Little	Pauline Little	Pauline Little
Mr. George Moppet	Gary Jewell	Gary Jewell	Gary Jewell
Mrs. Ellie Tompkins	Susan Glover	Susan Glover	Susan Glover
Mr. Jim Tompkins	Arthur Grosser	Arthur Grosser	Arthur Grosser
Officer McNabb	Terrence Scammell	Terrence Scammell	Terrence Scammell
Margie	Angelina Boivin	Angelina Boivin	Angelina Boivin
Jeannie and Joannie	Danielle Desormeaux	Danielle Desormeaux	Danielle Desormeaux
Janie	Danielle Desormeaux	Danielle Desormeaux	Danielle Desormeaux
Miss Feeny	Ellen David	Ellen David	Ellen David
Butch, the Lead West Side Boy	Ellen David	Ellen David	Ellen David
