= Little Lulu =

1935–1944 American comic strip

- The first Little Lulu cartoon from February 23, 1935 issue of The Saturday Evening Post
- Author: Marjorie "Marge" Henderson Buell
- Current status/schedule: Ended
- Launch date: February 23, 1935
- End date: December 30, 1944
- Publisher: The Saturday Evening Post
- Genre: Comic strip

Little Lulu is a comic strip created in 1935 by American cartoonist Marjorie Henderson Buell. The character, Lulu Moppet, first introduced in The Saturday Evening Post on February 23, 1935, in a single panel, appearing as a flower girl at a wedding and mischievously strewing the aisle with banana peels. Little Lulu replaced Carl Anderson's Henry, after Henry had been picked up for national distribution by King Features Syndicate. The Little Lulu panel continued to run weekly in The Saturday Evening Post until December 30, 1944.

Little Lulu was created as a result of Anderson's success. Schlesinger Library curator Kathryn Allamong Jacob wrote:

Lulu was born in 1935, when The Saturday Evening Post asked Buell to create a successor to the magazine’s Henry, Carl Anderson’s stout, mute little boy, who was moving on to national syndication. The result was Little Lulu, the resourceful, equally silent (at first) little girl whose loopy curls were reminiscent of the artist’s own as a girl. Buell explained to a reporter, "I wanted a girl because a girl could get away with more fresh stunts that in a small boy would seem boorish".

== History ==
Marge's Little Lulu

Publication information
- Publisher: Dell/Gold Key(Western)
- Schedule: bi-monthly
- Format: Ongoing series
- Genre: Humor/comedy
- Publication date: Jan/Feb 1948 – March 1984
- No. of issues: 268

Creative team
- Written by: John Stanley
- Artist(s): Irving Tripp; John Stanley

Collected editions
- In the Doghouse: ISBN 1-59307-345-3
- Lulu Goes Shopping: ISBN 1-59307-270-8
- Lulu Takes a Trip: ISBN 1-59307-317-8
- Letters to Santa: ISBN 1-59307-386-0
- Lulu's Umbrella Service: ISBN 1-59307-399-2

Pennsylvania native Marjorie Henderson Buell (1904–1993), whose work appeared under the pen name "Marge", had created two comic strips in the 1920s: The Boy Friend and Dashing Dot, both with female leads. She first had Little Lulu published as a single-panel cartoon in The Saturday Evening Post on February 23, 1935. The single-panel strip continued in the Post until the December 30, 1944 issue, and continued from then as a regular comic strip. Buell herself stopped drawing the comic strip in 1947. In 1950, Little Lulu became a daily syndicated series by Chicago Tribune–New York News Syndicate, and ran until 1969.

Comic-book stories of the character scripted by John Stanley appeared in ten issues of Dell's Four Color before a Marge's Little Lulu series appeared in 1948 with scripts and layouts by Stanley and finished art by Irving Tripp and others. Stanley greatly expanded the cast of characters and changed the name of Lulu's pudgy pal from "Joe" to "Tubby", a character that was popular enough himself to warrant a Marge's Tubby series that ran from 1952 to 1961. Little Lulu was widely merchandised, Writer/artist John Stanley's work on the Little Lulu comic book is highly regarded. He did the initial Lulu comics, later working with artists Irving Tripp and Charles Hedinger (because Tripp inked Hedinger before eventually assuming both duties), writing and laying out the stories.

He continued working on the comic until around 1959. Stanley is responsible for the many additional characters in the stories. After Stanley, other writers produced the Lulu stories for Gold Key Comics, including Arnold Drake. The comics were translated into French, Spanish, Japanese, Arabic, Portuguese, and other languages. After Buell's retirement in 1972 she signed the rights to Western Publishing. Marge's was dropped from the title, and the series continued until 1984.

== Characters ==
The main characters of the Little Lulu comic strip include the following. Full details and supporting and minor characters can be found in the main article of Little Lulu characters. Variations from the comic strip and other media representations are discussed in the main article.

- Little Lulu – Louise "Little Lulu" Moppet is the main character and Tubby and Annie's best friend. She is very smart, but stubborn, and she always initiates a battle with the boys to show that the girls are as good as the boys. Lulu is also very creative and tells stories to Alvin to teach him a lesson in an entertaining way. She wears a red dress and hat and has long black curly hair with brown highlights.
- Tubby Tompkins – Thomas "Tubby" Tompkins is Lulu's male best friend and her chief opponent in their disputes. He is the leader of the boys' club known as "The Fellers". He is negligent and always forgets to pay the monthly fee or to fulfill the obligations and his clubmates often take him out of office. Tubby is in love with Gloria, but she's rarely given him a chance. He has red hair and wears a white sailor hat, a black suit jacket, a large blue bowtie and light brown/orange pants, making his attire very similar to a sailor's uniform. See main article: Tubby Tompkins.
- Annie Inch – Lulu's female best friend who is involved in most of Lulu's escapades and adventures. She is not as smart, but she is a true friend who helps Lulu in her plans. Sometimes she is annoyed at everyone for no reason. Annie is Iggy's sister. She has short black straight hair and wears a blue dress (in the earlier years, she wore a yellow dress).
- Iggy Inch – Tubby's male best friend and a member of the "Fellers". He is grumpy, mischievous and always doing tricks. Iggy is Annie's brother. He has a shaved head, and wears a white collar shirt and orange pants (in the earlier years, he wore an orange collared shirt and blue pants).
- Willie Wilkins – One of Tubby's friends and the strongest member of the "Fellers". He has short black hair and wears an orange cap, a green suit jacket, and orange knickers (in the earlier years, he wore a brown cap, a red shirt and gray knickers).
- Eddie Stimson – One of Tubby's friends and the smartest member of the "Fellers". He often creates the boys' plans against the West Side Boys. He has short blond hair and wears a blue whoopee cap, a red sweater and blue pants.
- Wilbur Van Snobbe – The richest and most charming boy in town. He likes to be loved by the girls, but he is arrogant and petulant, being sweet only with Gloria. Wilbur has no friends, although he sometimes plays with the other kids. He has curly blond hair and wears a purple suit (in the earlier years, he had red hair and a blue suit).
- Gloria Goode (Darling) – The most beautiful girl in town. She is nice and playful with the girls, who secretly hate her out of envy, and the boys, who fall in love with her. Gloria has a friendly rivalry with Lulu and she is richer than most of the class, although less wealthy than Wilbur. She has long, wavy blonde hair and wears a ruffled pink dress.
- Alvin Jones – Lulu's 6-year-old neighbor. He is mischievous, bratty and only stops tantrums when Lulu tells a story. He has red hair with a quiff and wears a blue and white ball cap, a white shirt and blue overalls.
- George and Martha Moppet – Lulu's parents. Martha is a great cook and George is always targeted by Tubby's pursuit as a detective.
- Jim and Ellie Tompkins – Tubby's parents.
- The West Side Boys – A gang of stronger, tougher bully boys from across town who are the rival club of the "Fellers" and always try to invade their club. The most frequently seen of the West Side Boys are Butch (the leader), Mickey and Spike, while other individual members include Mike, Slug, Junior and Guggy.

== Comic strips and comic books ==
John Stanley's Little Lulu No. 72 (June 1954).

A daily comic strip, entitled Little Lulu, was syndicated by the Chicago Tribune–New York News Syndicate from June 5, 1950, through May 31, 1969. Artists included Woody Kimbrell (1950–1964), Roger Armstrong (1964–1966), and Ed Nofziger (1966–1969).

Little Lulu appeared in ten issues of Dell Comics' Four Color comic book series (#74, 97, 110, 115, 120, 131, 139, 146, 158, 165), before being promoted to her own title: Marge's Little Lulu in 1948.

With the Dell Comics/Western Publishing split that created Gold Key Comics, Little Lulu went to Gold Key with issue No. 165. Tubby got his own comic series from 1952 to 1961, first appearing in Four Color No. 381, 430, 444, and 461; then his own title Marge's Tubby from No. 5 through No. 49. In this series, Tubby had his own adventures without Lulu, especially with the Little Men from Mars.

Upon retirement, Marge sold Little Lulu to Western Publishing. The comic was renamed Little Lulu with No. 207 (September 1972). Publication of the comics stopped printing in 1984 (with issue No. 268, the last few under the Whitman Comics name), when Western discontinued publishing comics. Artist Hy Eisman retained stories intended for #269–270 (scripted by Paul Kuhn) because the artwork was returned to him after the comic was cancelled. Three of these are to be reprinted in the Lulu fanzine The HoLLywood Eclectern (HE). "The Case of the Disappearing Tutu", slated to be the lead story in Little Lulu No. 270, appears in HE No. 47 (2008).

There were also two giant-sized Annuals (#1–2, 1953–1954), 14 Dell Giants (with seasonal and other themes), a regular-sized unnumbered special on visiting Japan and three Gold Key Specials (two with Lulu on Halloween and summer camp and one with Tubby and the Little Men from Mars). Lulu also appeared in 20 issues of March of Comics and was reprinted in several Golden Comics Digests.

Between 1985 and 1992 Another Rainbow Publishing published a hardbound 18-volume set, the Little Lulu Library, collecting the stories in the Four Color issues, plus the regular series through No. 87.

While Western Publishing's Little Lulu stopped being released in 1984, in Brazil, new Lulu stories, penned by local artists, kept being published by Editora Abril. Primaggio Mantovi was responsible for overseeing the production. Luluzinha, Abril's main monthly Lulu comic series, ended in 1993.

== Advertising and merchandising ==
Little Lulu was featured on numerous licensed products, and she was the centerpiece of an extensive advertising campaign for Kleenex tissues during the 1940s–50s, being the first mascot for Kleenex tissues; from 1952 to 1965 the character appeared in an elaborate animated billboard in Times Square in New York City. and she was also seen in Pepsi-Cola magazine ads during that period. Kleenex commercials featuring Little Lulu were regularly seen in the 1950s on Perry Como's TV show. Buell (the comics' creator) played an active role in merchandising Little Lulu, often taking a hands-on role in terms and negotiations. Currently, the trademarks on Little Lulu are held by NBCUniversal (which manages the properties of DreamWorks Classics, as well as its parent company, DreamWorks Animation).

== Adaptations ==
=== Short films ===
Between 1943 and 1948, Lulu appeared in 26 theatrical animated shorts produced by Famous Studios for Paramount Pictures, replacing the Superman shorts of the 1940s. Paramount went on to create a similar character, Little Audrey, after failing to renew the Lulu license, and thereby avoiding the payment of royalty fees.

Lulu was voiced by Cecil Roy, while Tubby was voiced by Arnold Stang. The theme song for the shorts was written by Buddy Kaye, Fred Wise, and Sidney Lippman, and performed by the singing group Helen Carroll and the Satisfiers. All musical arrangements were done by Winston Sharples and Sammy Timberg.

In 1956, all the 26 Little Lulu cartoons were sold to U.M. & M. TV Corporation and are currently back in the hands of Paramount Pictures. However since U.M. & M. and their successors (NTA and Republic) did not renew their copyrights, all Little Lulu cartoons released from 1946 to 1948 are in the public domain. While the cartoons have been widely available on unaurthorized VHS and DVD sets (usually in poor quality), there was no official DVD or Blu-Ray release of these cartoons until 2026.

On January 26, 2026, film preservationist Thad Komorowski announced the Famous Studios Champions Collection, the first officially licensed DVD and Blu-ray release of some of the Paramount-owned Famous Studios cartoons. Distributed by ClassicFlix, and released under Komorowski's Cartoon Logic label on April 21, 2026, the set featured 18 cartoons restored from the original studio materials (in co-operation with the Paramount Pictures Archives). Out of the 18 shorts, only two Little Lulu cartoons were included, with those being Bargain Counter Attack (1945) and A Bout with a Trout (1947).

==== List of Little Lulu cartoons ====
No.	Title	Directed by	Written by	Animated by	Scenics by	Original release date	Musical arrangement by
1	"Eggs Don't Bounce"	I. Sparber	Carl Meyer, Jack Mercer, and Jack Ward	Nick Tafuri, Joe Oriolo, Tom Golden, and John Walworth	Robert Little	December 14, 1943	Sammy Timberg
Lulu buys some eggs for the stereotypical African-American maid Mandy, but when they end up broken, she tries to borrow eggs from Henrietta.
2	"Hullaba-Lulu"	Seymour Kneitel	Joe Stultz and Graham Place	Graham Place, Abner Kneitel, Gordon A. Sheehan, and Paul Busch	Shane Miller	February 25, 1944	Sammy Timberg
Lulu sneaks into the circus, where she disrupts every performance, but saves the ringmaster from a lion.
3	"Lulu Gets the Birdie"	I. Sparber	Carl Meyer	Dave Tendlar, Morey Reden, John Walworth, and John Gentilella	Robert Connavale	March 31, 1944	Winston Sharples
When Mandy scolds Lulu for making a mess because she heard from "a little bird", Lulu decides to literally go after the bird.
4	"Lulu in Hollywood"	I. Sparber	Joe Stultz and Dana Coty	Nick Tafuri, Tom Golden, John Walworth, and Joe Oriolo	Anton Loeb	May 19, 1944	Sammy Timberg
Lulu receives a telegram from a director and she is brought to Hollywood where he plans to make her famous.
5	"Lucky Lulu"	Seymour Kneitel	Carl Meyer	Graham Place, Abner Kneitel, and Gordon A. Sheehan	Robert Connavale	June 30, 1944	Winston Sharples
Lulu resolves to be good to avoid another spanking, but Mandy tells her it is Friday the 13th. She convinces Lulu to carry a good luck charm, so she obtains a horseshoe to keep out of trouble.
6	"It's Nifty to Be Thrifty"	Seymour Kneitel	Carl Meyer	Orestes Calpini, Reuben Grossman, Otto Feuer, and Frank Little	Robert Little	August 18, 1944	Sammy Timberg
Lulu's father tells the story of The Grasshopper and the Ant, and Lulu swears that she will be good with her money, then gives in to temptation at a candy store.
7	"I'm Just Curious"	Seymour Kneitel	William Turner and Jack Ward	Graham Place, George Cannata, Lou Zukor, and Sidney Pillet	Robert Connavale	September 8, 1944	Sammy Timberg
Lulu sings "I'm Just Curious" after being scolded by her father, then she encounters a chicken hawk.
8	"Lulu's Indoor Outing"	I. Sparber	Joe Stultz and Carl Meyer	Nick Tafuri, Tom Golden, John Walworth, and Gordon Whittier	Anton Loeb	September 29, 1944	Winston Sharples
Lulu has a picnic in a haunted house, much to Mandy's dismay. After eating the food, the ghosts reveal themselves to be hungry and Lulu invites them home.
9	"Lulu at the Zoo"	I. Sparber	Seymour Kneitel	Nick Tafuri, Tom Golden, John Walworth, and Gordon Whittier	Robert Connavale	November 17, 1944	Sammy Timberg
Lulu wreaks havoc at the zoo where she feeds the animals, to the zookeeper's chagrin.
10	"Lulu's Birthday Party"	I. Sparber	Bill Turner and Otto Messmer	Dave Tendlar, Morey Reden, Joe Oriolo, and John Gentilella	Robert Little	December 1, 1944	Sammy Timberg
Lulu accidentally spoils her birthday cake as Mandy is making it; later she is greeted by a wonderful surprise.
11	"Magica-Lulu"	Seymour Kneitel	Jack Ward	Graham Place, Lou Zukor, George Cannata, and Gordon Whittier	Anton Loeb	March 2, 1945	Winston Sharples
Inspired by a magician's act, Lulu decides she wants to be part of the show. Note: In the U.M. & M. TV Corporation version, this cartoon is titled Magical Lulu.
12	"Beau Ties"	Seymour Kneitel	Joe Stultz and Carl Meyer	Orestes Calpini, Reuben Grossman, Otto Feuer, and Frank Little	Shane Miller	April 20, 1945	Sammy Timberg
Shocked that Tubby (named "Fatso" in this cartoon) has started hanging out with Gloria (named "Fifi" in this cartoon), Lulu gets mad at him. He promises to put a carving on a giant tree saying that he will marry Lulu. Tubby then dreams that he is grown up and married to a henpecking Lulu.
13	"Daffydilly Daddy"	Seymour Kneitel	Joe Stultz and Carl Meyer	Orestes Calpini, Reuben Grossman, Otto Feuer, and Frank Little	Anton Loeb	May 25, 1945	Winston Sharples
The plant Lulu guards for her father ends up in the park, where a bulldog watches over it. Note: In the U. M. & M. TV Corporation version, this cartoon is titled Daffy Dilly Daddy.
14	"Snap Happy"	Bill Tytla	I. Klein	Orestes Calpini, Reuben Grossman, Otto Feuer, and Frank Little	Robert Connavale	June 22, 1945	Winston Sharples
Lulu pesters a photographer to take her picture, ruining his chances to get good scoops.
15	"Man's Pest Friend"	Seymour Kneitel	I. Klein and George Hill	Graham Place, Gordon Whittier, Lou Zukor, and Martin Taras	Shane Miller	December 7, 1945	Winston Sharples
Lulu helps her dog, Pal, evade the dogcatcher.
16	"Bargain Counter Attack"	I. Sparber	Bill Turner and Otto Messmer	Nick Tafuri, John Walworth, and Tom Golden	Anton Loeb	January 11, 1946	Winston Sharples
Lulu wants to exchange her doll for another toy at a department store. She has fun looking for something to exchange, but the store manager is annoyed with her indecision.
17	"Bored of Education"	Bill Tytla	I. Klein and George Hill	Nick Tafuri, John Walworth, Tom Golden, and Frank Little	Shane Miller	March 1, 1946	Winston Sharples
Confined to the corner in history class, Lulu dreams of chasing Tubby through history, until she gets a splash of the Fountain of Youth.
18	"Chick and Double Chick"	Seymour Kneitel	Carl Meyer and Jack Ward	Graham Place, Martin Taras, and Lou Zukor	Robert Little	August 16, 1946	Winston Sharples
Lulu and her dog closely guard some eggs in an incubator from a sneaky black cat.
19	"Musica-Lulu"	I. Sparber	Bill Turner and Otto Messmer	Myron Waldman, Gordon Whittier, Nick Tafuri, and Irving Dressler	Anton Loeb	January 24, 1947	Winston Sharples
Lulu wants to play baseball instead of her violin. After a knock on the head, she dreams that she is on trial for disregarding her violin. Note: In the U. M. & M. TV Corporation version, this cartoon is titled Musical Lulu.
20	"A Scout with the Gout"	Bill Tytla	Joe Stultz and Carl Meyer	George Germanetti, Tom Golden, Martin Taras, and Irving Dressler	Anton Loeb	March 24, 1947	Winston Sharples
Lulu's father teaches her how to be a Girl Scout, but a hungry raccoon gets him into a dangerous predicament.
21	"Loose in the Caboose"	Seymour Kneitel	Bill Turner and Larry Riley	Myron Waldman, Gordon Whittier, Nick Tafuri, Irving Dressler, and Wm. B. Pattengill	Robert Connavale	May 23, 1947	Winston Sharples
Traveling by train for a holiday, Lulu tries to avoid the conductor, who thinks she boarded without a ticket. Note: In the U. M. & M. TV Corporation version, this cartoon is titled Loose in a Caboose.
22	"Cad and Caddy"	I. Sparber	Woody Gelman and Larry Riley	Myron Waldman, Gordon Whittier, Nick Tafuri, Irving Dressler, and Wm. B. Pattengill	Anton Loeb	July 18, 1947	Winston Sharples
A golfer hires Lulu to be his caddy, promising to pay her a big juicy red lollipop. But she disappoints him, so she tricks him with the help of her pet frog, Quincy.
23	"A Bout with a Trout"	I. Sparber	I. Klein and Jack Ward	Myron Waldman, Gordon Whittier, Nick Tafuri, Irving Dressler, and Wm. B. Pattengill	Robert Connavale	October 30, 1947	Winston Sharples
Lulu decides to skip school and go fishing, but her guilt for truancy gets the better of her. Features the song "Swinging on a Star", from the film Going My Way.
24	"Super Lulu"	Bill Tytla	Joe Stultz and Carl Meyer	Steve Muffatti, George Germanetti, and Bill Hudson	Robert Connavale	November 21, 1947	Winston Sharples
Lulu likes super-hero stuff over Jack and the Beanstalk. She then dreams of rescuing her father from the giant's castle as Super Lulu.
25	"The Baby Sitter"	Seymour Kneitel	Bill Turner and Larry Riley	Dave Tendlar, Al Eugster, Martin Taras, and Tom Golden	Robert Little	December 12, 1947	Winston Sharples
Lulu opens a babysitting service, but the child she looks after (Alvin Jones) hits her on the head and she dreams that she is chasing the baby through town.
26	"The Dog Show-Off"	Seymour Kneitel	I. Klein and Jack Mercer	Myron Waldman, Gordon Whittier, Nick Tafuri, Irving Dressler, and Wm. B. Pattengill	Lloyd Hallock Jr.	January 30, 1948	Winston Sharples
Lulu helps a little boy enter his dog in the Annual Dog Show and tricks the judge into giving it first prize.

In the 1960s, Paramount and Famous Studios produced two new Little Lulu cartoons, "Alvin's Solo Flight" (a Noveltoon cartoon), and "Frog's Legs" (a Comic Kings cartoon), both based on two of John Stanley's comic stories. Cecil Roy reprised her role as Lulu, but Arnold Stang did not return as Tubby, as by that time, he already left Famous Studios to work at Hanna-Barbera Productions where he would perform the voices for Top Cat.

No.	Title	Directed by	Written by	Animated by	Scenics by	Original release date
27	"Alvin's Solo Flight"	Seymour Kneitel	John Stanley	Nick Tafuri and I. Klein	Robert Little	April 1961
Tubby and Lulu try to enjoy the beach while looking after little Alvin, who gives them a hard time.
28	"Frog's Legs"	Seymour Kneitel	John Stanley	Nick Tafuri, Jack Ehret, and Wm. B. Pattengill	Anton Loeb	April 1962
Tubby takes Lulu to catch some frogs to sell at the restaurant for money, but the frogs only cause chaos in the restaurant.

=== Feature films ===
ABC aired two half-hour live-action specials based on the comic on Saturday morning as part of ABC Weekend Special. Little Lulu was released on November 4, 1978 and The Big Hex of Little Lulu on September 15, 1979. The cast included:

- Lauri Hendler as Lulu
- Kevin King Cooper as Tubby
- Lulu Baxter as Annie
- Robbie Rist as Iggy
- Annrae Walterhouse as Gloria
- Billy 'Pop' Atmore as Willie
- Nicky Manfredi as Eddie
- Billy Jayne as Alvin
- Nita DiGiampaolo as Margie
- Shari Belafonte as Janie

=== Television adaptations ===
Little Lulu was adapted for the Japanese anime TV series Little Lulu to Chitchai Nakama (English: Little Lulu and Her Little Friends), was directed by Seitaro Kodama, produced by the Japanese studio Nippon Animation and written by Niisan Takahashi. the TV series was issued in Japan by ABC and NET. Lulu was interpreted by Eiko Masuyama in the first three episodes and Minori Matsushima for the remainder, Keiko Yamamoto interpreted to Tubby Tompkins, Alvin was voiced by Sachiko Chichimatsu and Annie and Iggy Inch were voiced by Junko Hori and Yoneko Matsukane respectively. The music was composed by Nobuyoshi Koshibe, The main theme in the original language was composed by and the end theme "Watashi wa Lulu" (I am Lulu) was composed only by Mitsuko Horie. An English-dubbed version of the anime was made for the American market by ZIV International in 1978, and this same company distributed globally the TV series; the show lasted from 1976 to 1977 with 26 episodes in total.

The characters in Little Lulu 1995 series. First row: Wilbur, Annie, Gloria, Alvin, Tubby, Little Lulu, Jeannie and Joannie and Margie; second row: Eddie, Iggy, Willie, Mr. George and Mrs. Martha Moppet.

In 1995, Little Lulu was adapted for The Little Lulu Show, an HBO animated TV series with the voices of Tracey Ullman (season 1) and Jane Woods (seasons 2–3) as Lulu Moppet. The series was produced by Canada-based CINAR (now WildBrain) after Marge's death two years earlier. The series ended in 1999, but continued to air on Family Channel (until 2003) and now-defunct Teletoon Retro in Canada.

=== Manga-style Brazilian comic ===
In 2009, Luluzinha Teen e sua Turma (English: Teen Little Lulu and her Gang), a Brazilian comic book series depicting Lulu and her friends as teenagers, was launched. The book was created in an attempt to rival Monica's Adventures, another comic book which also adapts a popular franchise (in this case, Brazilian Monica's Gang) by using a manga style and presenting its original characters were now as teenagers.

Lulu and Tubby have their first kiss in #50, a commemorative edition.

Luluzinha Teen e sua Turma became very popular in its introduction, being one of the best-selling comics in Brazil for a while, second only to its "rival". Nevertheless, unlike Monica's Adventures (which remains being published), Little Lulu's teen-aimed spin-off was canceled in 2015, after 65 issues.

== Later days ==
Lulu fans hold an annual gathering at San Diego Comic-Con in which they perform a play adapted from a classic Lulu story.

== Reprints ==
=== The Little Lulu Library ===
Published by Another Rainbow Publishing, were a series of six-book boxsets released from 1985 to 1992. They were published in reverse order, with Set VI being released first, then counting down to Set I. Each of the six sets contains three volumes, each with about six comics. The comics are printed in B&W; however, the covers are printed in full color. The books are about 9" by 12", with the pages being larger than the original comic book pages.

=== Dark Horse reprints ===
In 2004, Dark Horse Comics obtained the rights to reprint Little Lulu comics. 18 B&W volumes, plus an unnumbered color special, were published through early 2008. After a short hiatus, the series resumed in mid-2009 in full color. Volumes 4-5 were originally published until the first three volumes, as it was felt that their content was more accessible.

Little Lulu panel from March 20, 1943 issue of The Saturday Evening Post.

1. My Dinner with Lulu ISBN 1-59307-318-6 (reprints Four Color Comics No. 74, 97, 110, 115, 120)
2. Sunday Afternoon ISBN 1-59307-345-3 (reprints Four Color Comics No. 131, 139, 146, 158)
3. Lulu in the Doghouse ISBN 1-59307-345-3 (reprints Four Color Comics No. 165 and Little Lulu #1–5)
4. Lulu Goes Shopping ISBN 1-59307-270-8 (reprints Little Lulu #6–12)
5. Lulu Takes a Trip ISBN 1-59307-317-8 (reprints Little Lulu #13–17)
6. Letters to Santa ISBN 1-59307-386-0 (reprints Little Lulu #18–22)
7. Lulu's Umbrella Service ISBN 1-59307-399-2 (reprints Little Lulu #23–27)
8. Late for School ISBN 1-59307-453-0 (reprints Little Lulu #28–32)
9. Lucky Lulu ISBN 1-59307-471-9 (reprints Little Lulu #33–37)
10. All Dressed Up ISBN 1-59307-534-0 (reprints Little Lulu #38–42)
11. April Fools ISBN 1-59307-557-X (reprints Little Lulu #43–48)
12. Leave It to Lulu ISBN 1-59307-620-7 (reprints Little Lulu #49–53)
13. Too Much Fun ISBN 1-59307-621-5 (reprints Little Lulu #54–58)
14. Queen Lulu ISBN 1-59307-683-5 (reprints Little Lulu #59–63)
15. The Explorers ISBN 1-59307-684-3 (reprints Little Lulu #64–68)
16. A Handy Kid ISBN 1-59307-685-1 (reprints Little Lulu #69–74)
17. The Valentine ISBN 1-59307-686-X (reprints Little Lulu #75–81)
18. The Expert ISBN 1-59307-687-8 (reprints Little Lulu #82–87)
19. The Alamo and Other Stories ISBN 1-59582-293-3 (reprints Little Lulu #88–93 in full color)
20. The Bawlplayers and Other Stories ISBN 1-59582-364-6 (reprints Little Lulu #94–99 in full color)
21. Miss Feeny's Folly and Other Stories ISBN 1-59582-365-4 (reprints Little Lulu #100–105 in full color)
22. The Big Dipper Club and Other Stories ISBN 1-59582-420-0 (reprints Little Lulu #106–111 in full color)
23. The Bogey Snowman and Other Stories ISBN 1-59582-474-X (reprints Little Lulu #112–117 in full color)
24. The Space Dolly and Other Stories ISBN 1-59582-475-8 (reprints Little Lulu #118–123 in full color)
25. The Burglar-Proof Clubhouse and Other Stories ISBN 1-59582-539-8 (reprints Little Lulu #124–129 in full color)
26. The Feud and Other Stories ISBN 1-59582-632-7 (reprints Little Lulu #130–135 in full color)
27. The Treasure Map and Other Stories ISBN 1-59582-633-5 (reprints Dell Giant/Marge's Little Lulu and her Special Friends No. 3 and Dell Giant/Marge's Little Lulu and her Friends No. 4 in full color)
28. The Prize Winner and Other Stories ISBN 1-59582-731-5 (reprints Dell Giant/Marge's Little Lulu and Tubby at Summer Camp No. 5 and Dell Giant/Marge's Little Lulu and Tubby Halloween Fun No. 6 in full color)
29. The Cranky Giant and Other Stories ISBN 1-59582-732-3 (reprints Dell Giant/Marge's Little Lulu and Tubby at Summer Camp No. 2 and Dell Giant/Marge's Lulu and Tubby Halloween Fun No. 2 in full color)
- Little Lulu Color Special ISBN 1-59307-613-4 (reprints a selection of stories from Little Lulu No. 4 through No. 86 in full color)

Dark Horse later began issuing Giant Size volumes; each collects three of their reprint books.

1. Giant Size Little Lulu Volume 1 ISBN 1-59582-502-9 (reprints Four Color Comics No. 74, 97, 110, 115, 120, 131, 139, 146, 158, 165 and Little Lulu #1–5)
2. Giant Size Little Lulu Volume 2 ISBN 1-59582-540-1 (reprints Little Lulu #6–22)
3. Giant Size Little Lulu Volume 3 ISBN 1-59582-634-3 (reprints Little Lulu #23–37)
4. Giant Size Little Lulu Volume 4 ISBN 1-59582-752-8 (reprints Little Lulu #38–53)

In 2010, Dark Horse reprinted the companion Tubby series (Little Lulu's Pal Tubby) in volumes similar to their Lulu volumes.

1. The Castaway and Other Stories ISBN 1-59582-421-9 (reprints Four Color Comics No. 381, 430, 444, 461 and Tubby #5–6 in full color)
2. The Runaway Statue and Other Stories ISBN 1-59582-422-7 (reprints Tubby #7–12 in full color)
3. The Frog Boy and Other Stories ISBN 1-59582-635-1 (reprints Tubby #13–18 in full color)
4. The Atomic Violin and Other Stories ISBN 1-59582-733-1 (reprints Tubby #19–24 in full color)

=== Drawn & Quarterly reprints ===
In May 2018, Drawn & Quarterly announced that they will be reprinting John Stanley's Little Lulu comics in a multi-volume best-of series, beginning in spring 2019. Drawn & Quarterly reprinted a selection of John Stanley's stories for Free Comic Book Day 2019.

- Marge's Little Lulu in World's Best Comic Book ISBN 978-1-77046-379-0 (reprints a selection of stories from John Stanley's tenure on Little Lulu in full color for Free Comic Book Day 2019)
- Little Lulu: Working Girl (November 2019), ISBN 978-1-77046-365-3
- Little Lulu: The Fuzzythingus Poopi (September 2020), ISBN 978-1-77046-366-0
- Little Lulu: The Little Girl Who Could Talk To Trees (December 2021), 978-1-77046-389-9

In 2009, Drawn & Quarterly printed a volume of John Stanley Tubby comics as part of their John Stanley Library series.

- Tubby: The John Stanley Library ISBN 978-1-77046-023-2 (reprints the comic material from Tubby #9–12, designed by Seth)

== In popular culture ==
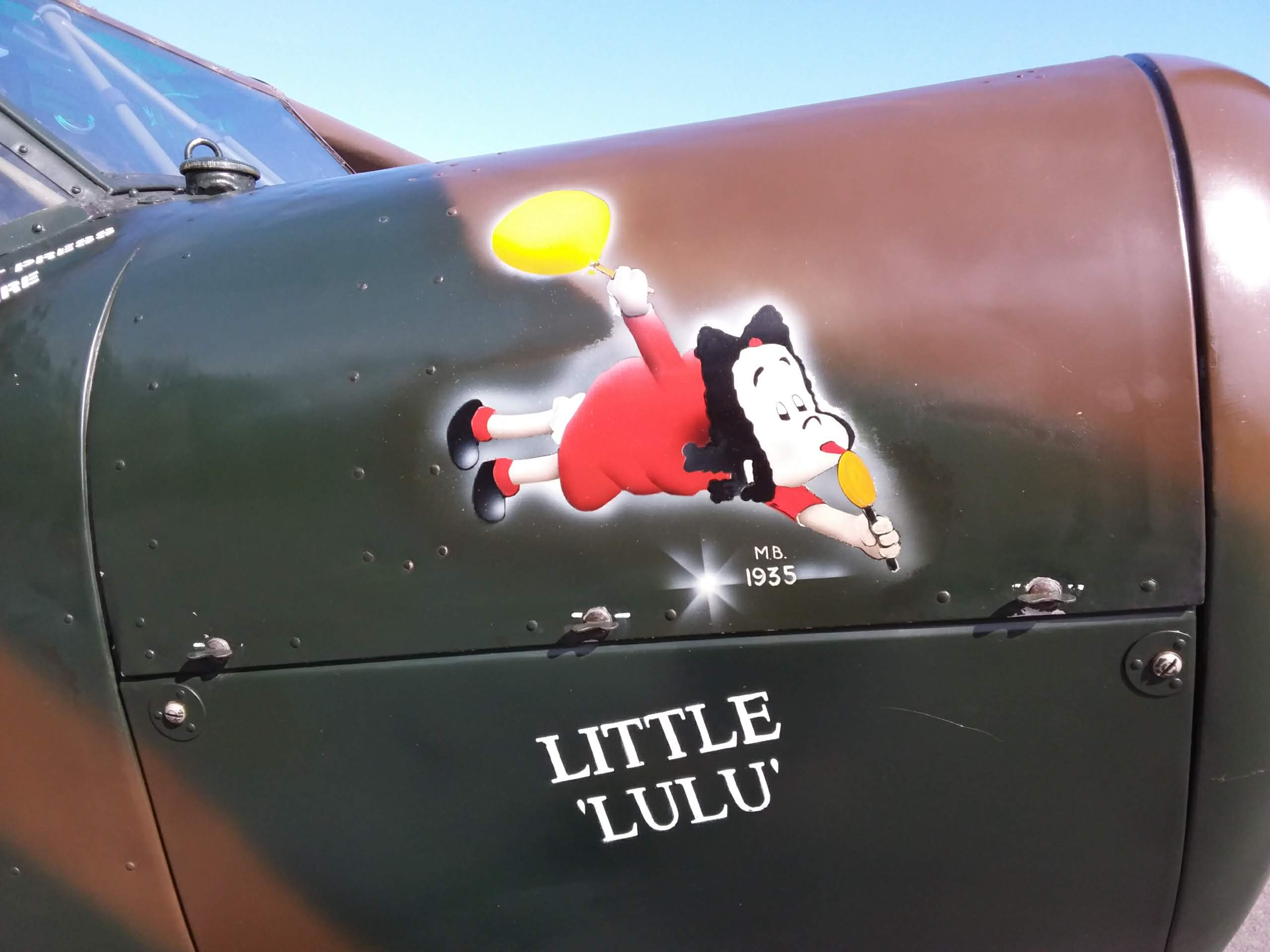
WW2 "Little Lulu" Nose Art on Auster Mk.IV NJ695

During WW2 the RAF Auster Mk.IV aircraft serial number NJ695 was named "Little Lulu" and was adorned with the character as nose art.

As a cameo appearance, Little Lulu was planned for the 1988 Disney live-action/animated hybrid family comedy film Who Framed Roger Rabbit, but rights to the character could not be obtained in time.

In 1994, an organization called Friends of Lulu, was founded that lasted until 2011, its name was based on Little Lulu. In 2006, Buell's family donated a collection of Buell's artwork and related papers as Marge Papers to the Schlesinger Library on the History of Women in America.

She makes a cameo appearing on a comic book cover in The Simpsons episode "Husbands and Knives" (2007), being read by Alan Moore.

In Brazil, the expression for "boys' club" (an environment that did not include women) is "clube do Bolinha" (meaning "Tubby's club").

== See also ==
- Little Lulu and Her Little Friends
- The Little Lulu Show
- Friends of Lulu, a U.S. organization promoting participation of women in the comic-book industry
