= Marge (cartoonist) =

American cartoonist

- Marge working on a sketch of her most famous character, Little Lulu
- Born: Marjorie Lyman Henderson; December 11, 1904 Philadelphia, Pennsylvania, U.S.
- Died: May 30, 1993 (aged 88) Elyria, Ohio, U.S.
- Area: Cartoonist
- Notable works: Little Lulu

Marjorie Henderson Buell (née Marjorie Lyman Henderson, December 11, 1904 – May 30, 1993) was an American cartoonist who worked under the pen name Marge. She was best known as the creator of Little Lulu.

== Early life ==
Marjorie Lyman Henderson was born in 1904 in Philadelphia to Horace Lyman Henderson and Bertha Brown Henderson. She and her two sisters grew up on a farm outside Malvern. The three sisters drew comics for birthday cards and family events while they were growing up. At the age of 8 she began selling her work to friends. She attended and then graduated from Villa Maria Academy High School in 1921.

== Career ==
At 16, she sold her first cartoon to the Public Ledger. Her work appeared in humor magazines and other periodicals, including Collier's, Judge, Life. She also created illustrations for Country Gentleman and Ladies' Home Journal. By the late 1920s, she worked under the name "Marge" and had a syndicated comic strip, The Boy Friend, her first syndicated comic strip, which ran from 1925 through 1926. This and another strip of hers, Dashing Dot, both featuring female leads. Marge was friends with Oz author Ruth Plumly Thompson and illustrated her fantasy novel King Kojo (1933).

In 1934, The Saturday Evening Post requested Buell to create a strip to replace Carl Anderson's Henry. Buell created a little girl character in place of Henry's little boy as she believed "a girl could get away with more fresh stunts that in a boy would seem boorish". The first single-panel installment ran in the Post on February 23, 1935; in it, Lulu appears as a flower girl at a wedding and strews the aisle with banana peels. The single-panel strip continued in the Post until the December 30, 1944, issue, and continued from then as a regular comic strip. Buell retained the rights, unusual for the time. Buell marketed Little Lulu widely throughout the 1940s. Buell herself ceased drawing the strip in 1947, and in 1950 Little Lulu became a daily syndicated by Chicago Tribune–New York News Syndicate and ran until 1969. After she stopped drawing the strip, Buell herself drew Lulu only for the lucrative Kleenex advertisements.

The first Little Lulu from the February 23, 1935 issue of The Saturday Evening Post

Paramount Pictures approached Buell in 1943 with a proposal to develop a series of animated shorts. She traveled to New York to meet with Paramount executives and tour the animation facilities, and there was introduced to William C. Erskine, who became her business representative.

Thereafter, Little Lulu was widely merchandised, and was the first mascot for Kleenex tissues; from 1952 to 1965 the character appeared in an elaborate animated billboard in Times Square in New York City designed by Artkraft Strauss.

The character appeared in comic books, animated cartoons, greeting cards and more. Little Lulu comic books, popular internationally, were translated into Arabic, Dutch, Finnish, French, Japanese, Norwegian, Portuguese, Spanish, Swedish and Greek. Buell stopped drawing Little Lulu in 1947, and the work was continued by others, while she kept creative control. Sketching and writing of the Little Lulu comic book series was taken on by John Stanley, who later drew Nancy and Sluggo. Buell sold her Little Lulu rights to Western Publishing when she retired in 1971.

== Personal life ==
On January 30, 1935, she married Clarence Addison Buell who had a career in the Bell Telephone Company. The two reached a compromise in their career ambitions, in that the husband agreed to turn down promotions that would result in relocation, and the wife would keep her creation enough in check that she would be available for her children. The couple had two sons: Larry , born in 1939; and Fred, born in 1942.

She shied from the spotlight, rarely giving interviews or allowing publication of photos of herself. She also shied away from politics, and resisted requests from her sons to include progressive elements such as a black playmate for Lulu or overtly feminist themes. Her son Larry stated in 2007 that "she didn't think of Lulu as a part of politics. She drew a line between entertainment and didacticism."

After the sale of the Lulu copyrights in 1971, the Buell couple retired to Ohio, where Larry lived. Buell died May 30, 1993, of lymphoma in Elyria, Ohio. Buell's son Larry is a professor of American Literature at Harvard, and her son Fred is a professor of English at Queens College.

== Legacy ==
The nonprofit organization Friends of Lulu (1994–2011) was named after Little Lulu — the organization, which was dedicated to promoting the readership of comic books by women and the participation of women in the comic book industry, chose its name based on the repeated trope of Little Lulu trying to break into the boys' clubhouse, where girls aren't allowed. In 2000, Marge was inducted into Friends of Lulu's Women Cartoonists Hall of Fame.

In July 2006, Buell's family donated the "Marge Papers" to the Schlesinger Library at Harvard University. The papers include a collection of fan mail, comic books, scrapbooks of high points in Lulu's history and a complete set of the newspaper cartoons.

In 2005, Heritage Auctions sold the original art to the first Little Lulu panel for $9,200. In recent years, Buell's original art from Little Lulu panels regularly bring between $2,000-$3,000 at auction.
