= The Harveytoons Show =

Television series of 1950s

The Harveytoons Show is a television series presenting theatrical animated cartoons produced by Famous Studios from 1950 until 1962, which were acquired by The Harvey Entertainment Company from Paramount Pictures.

== History ==
This show features Noveltoons characters and series including: Casper the Friendly Ghost, Little Audrey, Tommy Tortoise and Moe Hare, Wendy the Good Little Witch, Baby Huey, Herman and Katnip, Spooky the Tuff Little Ghost, Buzzy the Crow, Inchy the Worm, Finny the Goldfish, Goodie the Gremlin, Kozmo the Space Kid, Professor Schmaltz, Timothy Turkey, Jeepers and Creepers and others. The New Casper Cartoon Show and the Film Roman version of Richie Rich have also been featured on the final season of The Harveytoons Show. The show itself contained three full cartoons and one "ToonTake", an abbreviated cartoon. Jerry Beck was the show consultant.

== The Harveytoons Show broadcast history ==
- 1960s-Early 2000s: ABS-CBN and RPN (Philippines)
- Mid 1990s–Early 2010s: TPI/MNCTV (IDN)
- 1990–1994: The Children's Channel (as Casper and Friends) (UK)
- 1991–1992: Channel 2 (as Casper and Friends) (New Zealand)
- 1998–1999: Fox Family Channel (USA)
- 2000s: Trans TV (IDN)
- 2003–2006: Boomerang (as Casper and Friends) (USA)
- 2005-2009: Astro Ceria (Malaysia)
- 2008–2015: Tooncast and Boomerang (also as Casper and Friends) (LatAM)
- 2008–2012, 2015: Teletoon Retro (also as Casper and Friends) (Canada)
- 2010-2012: Nickelodeon (India)
- 2011-2016: PBJ (USA)
- 2012–2018: KTV (though in a small selection) (USA)
- 2014: Retro TV (USA)
- 2016-2019: INTV (IDN)
- 2020–present: Nusantara TV (IDN)
- 2024–present: MeTV Toons (as Casper and Company) (USA)

== Sources ==
- Casper and Friends
- The New Casper Cartoon Show
- The Baby Huey Show
- Richie Rich

== Episodes ==
The show consisted of Famous Studios-produced cartoons from 1950 to 1962. There were 223 theatrical cartoons released during that period. Only 165 cartoons were included in their full format, although the original theatrical titles were changed when Harvey assumed ownership from Famous. The remainder of the 58 cartoons were either only included as fragments or not included. Jerry Beck later explained that the trimming of some cartoons was only done to help each episode fit the half-hour format, and some were excluded from the show either from oversight or because the content of those cartoons could be considered to be not politically correct.

All original television-produced shorts on the show were either from later TV cartoons featuring Casper and the Film Roman version of Richie Rich, and those were mostly featured in the final season of The Harveytoons Show.

Each episode included three full cartoons and one "ToonTake" segment.

=== Season 1 ===
- Episode 1: Casper the Friendly Ghost – Boo Moon / Harveytoon featuring Little Audrey – Dizzy Dishes / Harveytoon present a Modern Madcap featuring a prototypical Kozmo – Out of This Whirl / Harvey ToonTake – Invention Convention
- Episode 2: Herman and Katnip – Mouse Trapeze / Harveytoon presents Casper the Friendly Ghost - Casper Comes to Clown / Harveytoon presents a Modern Madcap – Jolly the Clown / Harvey ToonTake featuring Baby Huey – Clown on the Farm
- Episode 3: Scout Fellow featuring Baby Huey / Harveytoon presents Casper the Friendly Ghost – Boo Scout / Harveytoon presents a Modern Madcap featuring Jeepers and Creepers – Scouting for Trouble / Harvey ToonTake featuring Herman and Katnip – Northwest Mousie
- Episode 4: Herman and Katnip – Cat Tamale / Harveytoon presents Casper the Friendly Ghost – Bull Fright / Harveytoon – Pedro and Lorenzo / Harvey ToonTake – Fiesta Time
- Episode 5: Casper the Friendly Ghost – Once Upon a Rhyme / Harveytoon featuring Little Audrey – Little Audrey Riding Hood / Harveytoon presents a Modern Madcap – Dante Dreamer / Harvey ToonTake featuring Tommy Tortoise and Moe Hare – Winner by a Hare
- Episode 6: Herman and Katnip – Mousetro Herman / Harveytoon presents Casper the Friendly Ghost – Boo Bop / Harveytoon – Animal Fair / Harvey ToonTake – Vegetable Vaudeville
- Episode 7: Huey's Ducky Daddy featuring Baby Huey / Harveytoon featuring Little Audrey – The Seapreme Court / Harveytoon featuring Finny – Feast and Furious / Harvey ToonTake featuring Casper the Friendly Ghost – Casper's Spree Under the Sea
- Episode 8: Herman and Katnip – Herman the CAToonist / Harveytoon presents Casper the Friendly Ghost – Ghost of Honor / Harveytoon presents Tommy Tortoise and Moe Hare – Rabbit Punch / Harvey ToonTake featuring Inchy Worm – Tweet Music
- Episode 9: Casper the Friendly Ghost – Which is Witch / Harveytoon featuring Little Audrey – Case of the Cockeyed Canary / Harveytoon presents a Modern Madcap – Perry Popgun / Harvey ToonTake featuring Tommy Tortoise and Moe Hare – Sleuth But Sure
- Episode 10: Herman and Katnip – Mice Meeting You / Harveytoon presents Casper the Friendly Ghost – True Boo / Harveytoon featuring Baby Huey – Jumping with Toy / Harvey ToonTake featuring Casper the Friendly Ghost – Ice Scream
- Episode 11: Casper the Friendly Ghost – Boos and Saddles / Harveytoon featuring Baby Huey – Git Along Little Ducky / Harveytoon presents a Modern Madcap – Shootin' Stars / Harvey ToonTake featuring Herman and Katnip – Cat Carson Rides Again
- Episode 12: Casper the Friendly Ghost – Casper Takes a Bow-Wow / Harveytoon featuring Little Audrey – Dawg Gone / Harveytoon featuring Martin Kanine – Fido Beta Kappa / Harvey ToonTake featuring Herbert – By Leaps and Hounds
- Episode 13: Herman and Katnip – Cat in the Act / Harveytoon presents Casper the Friendly Ghost – Ghost Writers / Harveytoon presents a Modern Madcap featuring The Cat – Top Cat / HarveyToon Take featuring Baby Huey – Starting from Hatch

=== Season 2 ===
- Episode 14: Swab the Duck featuring Baby Huey / Harveytoon presents Casper the Friendly Ghost – Deep Boo Sea / Harveytoon presents Herman and Katnip – Ship-a-Hooey / Harvey ToonTake – Drippy Mississippi
- Episode 15: Casper the Friendly Ghost – Boos and Arrows / Harveytoon featuring Baby Huey – Huey's Ducky Daddy / Harveytoon presents Land of the Lost - Land of the Lost Watches / Harvey ToonTake featuring Little Audrey – Fishing Tackler
- Episode 16: Herman and Katnip – Of Mice and Menace / Harveytoon presents Casper the Friendly Ghost – Ghost of the Town / Harveytoon presents a Modern Madcap – TV Fuddlehead / Harvey ToonTake featuring Little Audrey – Law and Audrey
- Episode 17: Casper the Friendly Ghost – Do or Diet / Harveytoon presents Herman and Katnip – You Said a Mouseful / Harveytoon featuring Timothy the Turkey – The Voice of the Turkey / Harvey ToonTake – Hysterical History
- Episode 18: Herman and Katnip – Mice-Capades / Harveytoon presents Casper the Friendly Ghost – Fright from Wrong / Harveytoon – Crazytown / Harvey ToonTake – Houndabout
- Episode 19: Herman and Katnip – One Funny Knight / Harveytoon presents Casper the Friendly Ghost – Red, White, and Boo / Harveytoon presents a Modern Madcap – Silly Science / Harvey ToonTake featuring Inchy Worm – Dizzy Dinosaurs
- Episode 20: Casper the Friendly Ghost – Boo Kind to Animals / Harveytoon featuring Little Audrey – Surf Bored / Harveytoon featuring Spunky – Okey Dokey Donkey / Harvey ToonTake – Fun at the Fair
- Episode 21: Herman and Katnip – Robin Rodenthood / Harveytoon presents Casper the Friendly Ghost – Cage Fright / Harveytoon presents a Modern Madcap featuring The Cat – Bopin Hood / Harvey ToonTake featuring Little Audrey – Hold the Lion, Please
- Episode 22: Pest Pupil featuring Baby Huey / Harveytoon presents Casper the Friendly Ghost – Hooky Spooky / Harveytoon presents a Modern Madcap featuring Kozmo – Kozmo Goes to School / Harvey ToonTake featuring Little Audrey – Fishing Tackler
- Episode 23: One Quack Mind featuring Baby Huey / Harveytoon presents Casper the Friendly Ghost – Heir Restorer / Harveytoon featuring Herbert – By Leaps and Hounds / Harvey ToonTake featuring Herman and Katnip – Surf and Sound
- Episode 24: Casper the Friendly Ghost – Boo Ribbon Winner / Harveytoon featuring Little Audrey – Law and Audrey / Harveytoon presents a Modern Madcap featuring Specs – Cape Kidnaveral / Harvey ToonTake – Candy Cabaret
- Episode 25: Casper the Friendly Ghost – Good Scream Fun / Harveytoon presents Herman and Katnip – Mouseum / Harveytoon presents a Modern Madcap – Fine Feathered Friend (untitled) / Harvey ToonTake featuring Inchy Worm – Forest Fantasy
- Episode 26: Clown on the Farm featuring Baby Huey / Harveytoon presents Casper the Friendly Ghost – Hide and Shriek / Harveytoon presents Modern Madcap featuring Specs – Popcorn Politics (untitled) / Harvey ToonTake – Snooze Reel

=== Season 3 ===
- Episode 27: Casper the Friendly Ghost – Little Boo Peep / Harveytoon featuring Little Audrey – Fishing Tackler / Harveytoon presents a Modern Madcap featuring Luigi – The Shoe Must Go On / Harvey ToonTake – Gag and Baggage
- Episode 28: Herman and Katnip – A Bicep Built for Two / Harveytoon presents Casper the Friendly Ghost – North Pal / Harveytoon presents a Modern Madcap featuring Kozmo – The Kid from Mars / Harvey ToonTake featuring Little Audrey – The Seapreme Court
- Episode 29: Herman and Katnip – Drinks on the Mouse / Harveytoon presents Casper the Friendly Ghost – Pig-A-Boo / Harveytoon featuring Snappy – News Hound / Harvey ToonTake – Trick or Tree
- Episode 30: Huey's Father's Day featuring Baby Huey / Harveytoon presents Casper the Friendly Ghost – Peek-A-Boo / Harveytoon featuring Loui the Lion – Lion in the Roar / Harvey ToonTake featuring Little Audrey – Dizzy Dishes
- Episode 31: Herman and Katnip – Owly to Bed / Harveytoon presents Casper the Friendly Ghost – Boo-Hoo Baby / Harveytoon presents a Modern Madcap – Bouncing Benny / Harvey ToonTake featuring Harry the Hound – Hound About That
- Episode 32: Herman and Katnip – Sky Scrappers / Harveytoon presents Casper the Friendly Ghost – By the Old Mill Scream / Harveytoon featuring Waxey Weasel and Wishbone – Poop Goes the Weasel / Harvey ToonTake featuring Baby Huey – Pest Pupil
- Episode 33: Starting from Hatch featuring Baby Huey / Harveytoon featuring Casper the Friendly Ghost – Casper Genie / Harveytoon – Right off the Bat / Harvey ToonTake featuring Swifty and Shorty (a.k.a. Ralph and Percy) – TV or Not TV
- Episode 34: Herman and Katnip – From Mad to Worse / Harveytoon featuring Casper the Friendly Ghost – Doing What's Fright / Harveytoon presents a Modern Madcap featuring Silly Stork – Stork Raving Mad / Harvey ToonTake featuring Baby Huey – One Quack Mind
- Episode 35: Herman and Katnip – Hide and Peak / Harveytoon presents Casper the Friendly Ghost – Ice Scream / Harveytoon featuring Inchy Worm – Oily Bird / Harvey ToonTake featuring Baby Huey – Scout Fellow
- Episode 36: Casper the Friendly Ghost – Down to Mirth / Harveytoon featuring Mortimer Tortoise and the Hare – Turtle Scoop / Harveytoon presents a Modern Madcap – The Inquisit Visit / Harvey ToonTake featuring Herman and Katnip – Cat in the Act
- Episode 37: Casper the Friendly Ghost – Ground Hog Play / Harveytoon featuring Buzzy and Katnip (re-dubbed soundtrack) – Sock-a-Bye Kitty / Harveytoon presents a Modern Madcap – Talking Horse Sense / Harvey ToonTake – Aero-Nutics
- Episode 38: Casper the Friendly Ghost – Keep Your Grin Up / Harveytoon featuring Tommy Tortoise and Moe Hare – Sleuth But Sure / Harveytoon featuring Possum Pearl – Possum Pearl / Harvey ToonTake featuring Mike the Masquerader – Disguise the Limit
- Episode 39: Party Smarty featuring Baby Huey / Harveytoon presents Casper the Friendly Ghost – Casper's Birthday Party / Harveytoon presents a Modern Madcap – Miceniks / Harvey ToonTake featuring Professor Schmaltz – Mighty Termite

=== Season 4 ===
- Episode 40: Casper the Friendly Ghost – Not Ghoulty / Harveytoon featuring Buzzy and Katnip (re-dubbed soundtrack) – Hair Today, Gone Tomorrow / Harveytoon presents a Modern Madcap – Galaxia / Harvey ToonTake – Trick or Tree
- Episode 41: Casper the Friendly Ghost – Penguin for Your Thoughts / Harveytoon featuring Tommy Tortoise and Moe Hare – Mr. Money Gags / Harveytoon presents a Modern Madcap – Electronica / Harvey ToonTake featuring Mike the Masquerader – Disguise the Limit
- Episode 42: Casper the Friendly Ghost – Spook and Span / Harveytoon presents Herman and Katnip – Mice Paradise / Harveytoon featuring Danny Dinosaur – Cock-a-Doodle Dino / Harvey ToonTake Little Audrey – Little Audrey Riding Hood
- Episode 43: Casper the Friendly Ghost – Zero the Hero / Harveytoon featuring Buzzy and Katnip (re-dubbed soundtrack) – Cat-Choo / Harveytoon presents a Modern Madcap – Finnegan's Flea / Harvey ToonTake – No Place Like Rome
- Episode 44: Herman and Katnip – City Kitty / Harveytoon presents Casper the Friendly Ghost – Spooking Africa / Harveytoon presents a Modern Madcap – Travelaffs / Harvey ToonTake featuring Swifty and Shorty (a.k.a. Ralph and Percy) – Without Time or Reason
- Episode 45: Herman and Katnip – Northwest Mousie / Harveytoon presents Casper the Friendly Ghost – Dutch Treat / Harveytoon presents a Modern Madcap – Fit to Be Toyed / Harvey ToonTake – No Place Like Rome
- Episode 46: Casper the Friendly Ghost – Boo Bop / Harveytoon featuring Buzzy and Katnip (re-dubbed soundtrack) – Better Bait Than Never / Harveytoon featuring Julius – Houndabout / Harvey ToonTake featuring Swifty and Shorty (a.k.a. Ralph and Percy) – TV or Not TV
- Episode 47: Herman and Katnip – Rail Rodents / Harveytoon presents Casper the Friendly Ghost – Spook No Evil / Harveytoon presents a Modern Madcap featuring Mike the Masquerader – Mike the Masquerader / Harvey ToonTake featuring Baby Huey – Huey's Father's Day
- Episode 48: Herman and Katnip – Of Mice and Magic / Harveytoon presents Casper the Friendly Ghost – Puss 'N' Boos / Harveytoon presents a Modern Madcap – Funderful Suburbia / Harvey ToonTake featuring Jeepers and Creepers – The Boss is Always Right
- Episode 49: Casper the Friendly Ghost – Ghost of Honor / Harvey ToonTake Buzzy and Katnip (re-dubbed soundtrack) – The Awful Tooth / Harveytoon presents a Modern Madcap featuring Skit and Scat – Planet Mouseola / Harvey ToonTake – Off We Glow
- Episode 50: Herman and Katnip – Surf and Sound / Harveytoon presents Casper the Friendly Ghost – Spunky Skunky / Harveytoon presents a Modern Madcap – The Phantom Moustacher / Harvey ToonTake featuring Tommy Tortoise and Moe Hare – Mr. Money Gags
- Episode 51: Casper the Friendly Ghost – Ghost of the Town / Harveytoon featuring Buzzy and Katnip (re-dubbed soundtrack) – As the Crow Lies / Harveytoon presents a Modern Madcap featuring Sir Reginald Tweedledum IV – The Lion's Busy / Harvey ToonTake featuring Swifty and Shorty – Hi-Fi Jinx
- Episode 52: Casper the Friendly Ghost – Spooking with a Brogue / Harveytoon presents Herman and Katnip – Will Do Mousework / Harveytoon presents a Modern Madcap featuring Skit and Scat – Be Mice to Cats / Harvey ToonTake featuring Inchy Worm – The Oily Bird

=== Season 5 ===
- Episode 53: Casper the Friendly Ghost – Fright-day the 13th / Harveytoon presents Herman and Katnip – Frighty Cat / Harveytoon – Spooking of Ghosts / Harvey ToonTake featuring Waxey Weasel and Wishbone – Poop Goes the Weasel
- Episode 54: Casper the Friendly Ghost – To Boo or Not to Boo / Harveytoon presents Herman and Katnip – Mousieur Herman / Harveytoon featuring Goodie the Gremlin – Good and Guilty / Harvey ToonTake – Miners 49ers
- Episode 55: Herman and Katnip – Cat Carson Rides Again / Harveytoon presents Casper the Friendly Ghost – Boos and Saddles / Harveytoon presents a Modern Madcap featuring The Cat – Cane and Able / Harvey ToonTake featuring Little Audrey – Little Audrey Riding Hood
- Episode 56: Casper the Friendly Ghost – Line of Scream-age / Harveytoon featuring Tommy Tortoise and Moe Hare – Winner by a Hare / Harveytoon presents a Modern Madcap – Sportickles / Harvey ToonTake featuring Herman and Katnip – Robin Rodenthood
- Episode 57: Casper the Friendly Ghost – Puss 'N' Boos / Harveytoon presents Herman and Katnip – Felineous Assault / Harveytoon featuring Kitty Kuddles – Kitty Kornered / Harvey ToonTake featuring Baby Huey – Git Along Little Ducky
- Episode 58: Quack-A-Doodle Doo (untitled) featuring Baby Huey / Harveytoon presents Casper the Friendly Ghost – Red, White and Boo / Harveytoon presents a Modern Madcap – Grateful Gus / Harvey ToonTake featuring Herman and Katnip – Of Mice and Magic
- Episode 59: Herman and Katnip – Fun on Furlough (banned short) / Harveytoon presents Casper the Friendly Ghost – Boo Moon / Harveytoon presents a Modern Madcap featuring Renoir the Matchmaker – L'Amour the Merrier / Harvey ToonTake – From Dime to Dime
- Episode 60: Herman and Katnip – Katnip's Big Day / Harveytoon presents Casper the Friendly Ghost – Which Is Witch / Harveytoon – Sir Irving and Jeames / Harvey ToonTake featuring Wolfie – Fresh Yeggs
- Episode 61: Casper the Friendly Ghost – Doing What's Fright / Harveytoon featuring Little Audrey – Audrey the Rainmaker / Harveytoon presents a Modern Madcap featuring Renoir the Matchmaker – La Petite Parade / Harvey ToonTake featuring Wolfie – Fresh Yeggs
- Episode 62: Casper the Friendly Ghost – Boo-Hoo Baby / Harveytoon presents Herman and Katnip – Herman the Cartoonist / Harveytoon presents a Modern Madcap featuring Jeepers and Creepers – Trouble Date / Harvey ToonTake featuring Jeepers and Creepers – The Boss is Always Right
- Episode 63: Casper the Friendly Ghost – Casper Genie / Harveytoon featuring Goodie the Gremlin – Goodie the Gremlin / Harveytoon presents a Modern Madcap featuring Silly Stork – Monkey Doodles / Harvey ToonTake featuring Skit and Scat – Counter Attack
- Episode 64: Casper the Friendly Ghost – Fright from Wrong / Harveytoon featuring Little Audrey – Surf Bored / Harveytoon presents a Modern Madcap featuring The Cat – Cool Cat Blues / Harvey ToonTake featuring Jeepers and Creepers – Busy Buddies
- Episode 65: Casper the Friendly Ghost – Dutch Treat / Harveytoon featuring Baby Huey – Swab the Duck / Harveytoon presents a Modern Madcap featuring Professor Schmaltz – Fiddle Faddle / Harvey ToonTake – Miners 49ers

=== Season 6 ===
- Episode 66: Casper the Friendly Ghost – A Visit from Mars / Harveytoon presents Casper the Friendly Ghost – Hide and Shriek / Harveytoon - Abner the Baseball
- Episode 67: Casper the Friendly Ghost – The Absent-Minded Robot / Harveytoon presents Richie Rich – Bugged Out / Casper the Friendly Ghost – The Magic Touch / Harveytoon presents a Modern Madcap – Crumley Cogswell (banned short)
- Episode 68: Casper the Friendly Ghost – Bedtime Troubles / Harveytoon presents Richie Rich – Back in the Saddle / Harveytoon presents Casper the Friendly Ghost – Mother Goose Land / Harveytoon presents a Modern Madcap featuring Professor Schmaltz – Giddy Gadget (banned short)
- Episode 69: Casper the Friendly Ghost – Bored Billionaire / Harveytoon presents Richie Rich – Girls Only / Harveytoon presents Casper the Friendly Ghost – Professor's Problem
- Episode 70: Casper the Friendly Ghost – City Snickers / Harveytoon presents Richie Rich – Dognapped / Harveytoon presents Casper the Friendly Ghost – Red Robbing Hood / Harvey ToonTake – Fiesta Time
- Episode 71: Casper the Friendly Ghost – Boo Scout / Harveytoon – Crazytown / Harveytoon presents Casper the Friendly Ghost – Small Spooks / Harveytoon – Peck Your Own Home (banned short)
- Episode 72: Casper the Friendly Ghost – The Enchanted Horse / Harveytoon presents Richie Rich – Invasion of the Cadbury Robots / Harveytoon presents Casper the Friendly Ghost – Super Spooks
- Episode 73: Casper the Friendly Ghost – The Enchanted Prince / Harveytoon presents Richie Rich – Rich and Chocolatey / Harveytoon presents Casper the Friendly Ghost – The Timid Knight / Harveytooon presents a Modern Madcap – Slip Us Some Redskin (banned short)
- Episode 74: Casper the Friendly Ghost – The Greedy Giants / Harveytoon presents Richie Rich – Richie's Great Race / Casper the Friendly Ghost – Twin Trouble / Harveytoon presents a Modern Madcap featuring Professor Schmaltz – Terry the Terror (banned short)
- Episode 75: Casper the Friendly Ghost – Growing Up / Harveytoon presents Richie Rich – One of a Kind / Harveytoon presents Casper the Friendly Ghost – The Wandering Ghosts / Harveytoon presents a Modern Madcap – Trigger Treat (banned short)
- Episode 76: Casper the Friendly Ghost – True Boo / Harveytoon presents Richie Rich – Roughin' It / Harveytoon presents Casper the Friendly Ghost – Weather or Not / Harvey ToonTake featuring Inchy Worm – Dizzy Dinosaurs
- Episode 77: Casper the Friendly Ghost – Kings of Toyland / Harveytoon presents Richie Rich – Richie's Circus / Harveytoon presents Casper the Friendly Ghost – Wendy's Wish / Harvey ToonTake – Fun at the Fair
- Episode 78: Casper the Friendly Ghost – Little Lost Ghost / Harveytoon presents Richie Rich – The Love Potion / Harveytoon presents Richie Rich – Nothing to Hiccup At

== Not included on the show ==
This is the list of 8 theatrical Harvey-owned Famous Studios shorts and one Film Roman Richie Rich episode that were not included on the show, neither as full cartoons nor as "Toon Takes".

Produced by Famous Studios:

- Sing Again of Michigan – Harveytoon featuring Buzzy the Crow
- Philharmaniacs - Kartunes
- No Ifs, ands or Butts – Harveytoon featuring Buzzy the Crow

Produced by Paramount Cartoon Studios:

- Chew Chew Baby - Harveytoon
- Turning the Fables – Harveytoon featuring Mortimer Tortoise and the Hare
- Northern Mites – Harveytoon
- In the Nicotine – Modern Madcaps
- The Plot Sickens – Modern Madcaps

Produced by Film Roman:

- Cleaned Out - Richie Rich

== Home releases ==
In January 2005, a single DVD release titled "Hooky Spooky" containing three episodes of this series (the Casper and Friends version) was released by Right Entertainment/Universal Pictures Video in the United Kingdom.

In 2006, Classic Media released 52 of the show's 78 episodes on a four-disc DVD set titled Harvey Toons – The Complete Collection. The set received mixed reviews from animation fans, and the show's consultant, Jerry Beck, said Classic Media did not consult with him on making this DVD release. He stated that he would not have included the show's formatting of those cartoons, but did applaud Classic Media for the very good picture quality of the included shorts and for the set's low price tag, considering the high number of cartoons in the set. In 2011, Vivendi Entertainment and Classic Media released all Herman and Katnip cartoons on a single disc DVD set titled Herman and Katnip: The Complete Collection. In the same year, Shout! Factory released 61 of 78 Casper cartoons from The Harveytoons Show on a three-disc DVD set titled Casper the Friendly Ghost: The Complete Collection. In 2021, Universal Home Entertainment released 30 episodes on the DVD set titled The Best of the Harveytoons Show.
