= Bill Tytla =

American animator (1904–1968)

- Born: Vladimir Peter "Bill" Tytla; October 25, 1904; Yonkers, New York, U.S.
- Died: December 30, 1968 (aged 64); Flanders, Connecticut, U.S.
- Occupations: Animator, director
- Years active: 1920-1968
- Employer(s): Paramount Magazine (1920); Raoul Barré studio (1920-1925); John Terry studio (1925-1929); Terrytoons (1929-1934; 1943-1944; 1959-1962); Walt Disney Productions (1934-1943); Metro-Goldwyn-Mayer cartoon department (1942); Famous Studios (1945-1950); Tempo Productions (1950-1952); Warner Bros. Cartoons (1964); Format Films/Halas and Batchelor (1966-1967); Hanna-Barbera (1967-1968)
- Spouse: Adrienne le Clerc (m. 1938)
- Children: 2

Vladimir Peter "Bill" Tytla (October 25, 1904 – December 30, 1968) was a Ukrainian-American animator known for his work during the Golden Age of American animation, in the Walt Disney Productions animation unit, Paramount's Famous Studios, and Terrytoons. In his Disney career, Tytla is particularly noted for the animation in Snow White and the Seven Dwarfs, Pinocchio, Fantasia (The Sorcerer's Apprentice and Night on Bald Mountain/Ave Maria segments) and Dumbo. He was inducted as a Disney Legend in 1998.

Tytla was also known for co-creating Little Audrey for Paramount Pictures alongside Seymour Kneitel.

== Early years ==
Vladimir Peter Tytla was born on October 25, 1904, in Yonkers, New York, to Ukrainian immigrant parents. His parents reportedly recognized talent in their son and encouraged it. In 1914, when Tytla was 9, he visited Manhattan and saw a vaudeville performance of Gertie the Dinosaur, which greatly influenced him.

Tytla attended the New York Evening School of Industrial Design while still in high school. But eventually high school lost out to his interest in art and he quit. In 1920, at age 16, Tytla was working for the Paramount animation studio in New York. His assignment was providing lettering for title cards. He was nicknamed "Tytla the Titler."

His first animation experiences were on Mutt and Jeff short films at the Bronx studio of Raoul Barré and the Joy and Bloom Phable at the Greenwich Village studio of John Terry, later creator of the aviation comic strip Scorchy Smith. His brother Paul Terry, founder of Terrytoons, soon hired Tytla to work on his Aesop's Fables.

In just three years, he was earning a great salary as an animator and supporting his family. The simplistic nature of cartoons at the time did not challenge Tytla, who dreamed of becoming a fine artist. He took up his studies again at the Art Students League of New York and studied under Boardman Robinson.

In 1929, Tytla sailed for Europe with some of his school friends to study painting in Paris. There he not only studied painting, but sculpture with Charles Despiau. To this has been attributed the weight and three-dimensionality of his work. In Europe he was able to see first hand the masterpieces he had only read about. True to his nature of never wanting to be second best, Tytla came to the conclusion that he could never top these masters and destroyed most of his work.

== Back in America ==
Tytla returned to the United States with the attitude that he could become a great master of animation by incorporating his rich knowledge of art. Now animated shorts had sound which in turn brought a new enthusiasm and a need for talented animators. Paul Terry offered Tytla a job right away. There he met animator Art Babbitt, who became his close friend and roommate. Babbitt eventually left to work for Walt Disney because of the challenging work and good working conditions. For two years, Babbitt tried to entice Tytla to come out to Hollywood, but Tytla did not want to leave his family and a well-paying job during the Great Depression. Finally in 1934 Tytla flew to Hollywood. He was very impressed and accepted the job even at a lower salary than he was being paid at Terrytoons.

During his "probationary" year in 1935 Tytla worked on three shorts:

- The Cookie Carnival, a Silly Symphonies short, first released on May 25, 1935.
- Mickey's Fire Brigade, a cartoon featuring firefighters Mickey Mouse, Goofy and Donald Duck attempting to rescue Clarabelle Cow from a burning boarding house. First released on August 3, 1935.
- Cock o' the Walk, a Silly Symphonies short, first released on November 30, 1935.

The Cookie Carnival (1935)

Tytla in The Cookie Carnival was responsible for animating the gingerbread boy and girl as well as the rivalry between the angel-food and devil's food cakes. He animated the broadly comic Clarabelle Cow in Mickey's Fire Brigade. In Cock o' the Walk, Tytla animated his first "heavy," a bully rooster dancing the Carioca. Grim Natwick, creator of Betty Boop, remarked, "Bill hovered over his drawing board like a giant vulture protecting a nest filled with golden eggs, he was an intense worker—eager, nervous, absorbed... Key drawings were whittled out with impassioned pencil thrusts that tore holes in the animation paper."

His work did not go unnoticed by Walt Disney, who soon came to realize what he had in Tytla. Consequently, both his responsibilities and his wages increased dramatically. Tytla and Babbitt quickly became two of Disney's top-salaried artists, and again shared a residence—this time a Tuxedo Terrace house complete with a maid. He continued to send money home and purchased for his family 150 acre (607,000 m^{2}) of farmland in East Lyme, Connecticut. Babbitt started after hours "Action Analysis" classes and brought in Don Graham to teach. Tytla was an eager participator in these classes (later to become officially sanctioned by Disney), which have been credited with some of the phenomenal leaps in the quality of animation during this period.

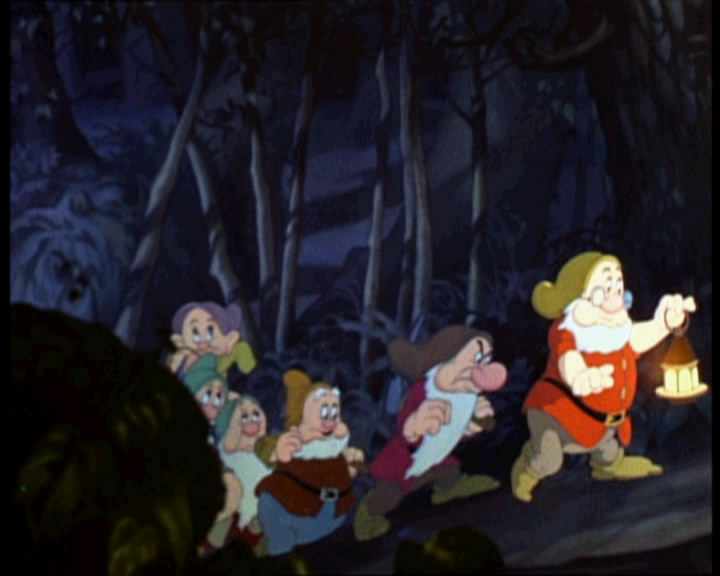
The dwarfs from Disney's Snow White and the Seven Dwarfs—Bill Tytla supervised the animation of the dwarfs and worked on Grumpy (second in line) in particular

Tytla was one of the first animators assigned to Snow White and the Seven Dwarfs. Fred Moore and Tytla were responsible for much of the design of the film and the definition of the personalities of the seven dwarfs. One of Tytla's famous scenes from the film (as described by John Canemaker) is where woman-hating Grumpy is kissed by Snow White. As he brusquely walks away, an internal warmth generated by the kiss gradually slows him, bringing a soft smile and sigh to his lips, revealing his true feelings of love. Grumpy's inner feelings are portrayed solely through pantomime—in his telling facial expressions, his body language, and the timing of his reactions.

== Marriage ==
One evening of 1936 in the art classes of Don Graham, a 22-year-old actress and fashion model from Seattle named Adrienne le Clerc posed for the animators, including Tytla. She shared his volcanic temperament, but admitted "My glass was half-filled with enthusiasm, his often half-empty with self-doubts. We were, however, definitely yin and yang". Their thirty-year marriage began on April 21, 1938.

Clearly, she was a great inspiration and support for her husband although she complained that to get her husband's attention when he was intently working on his animation, she had to stand in the doorway naked.

== Continued Disney career ==
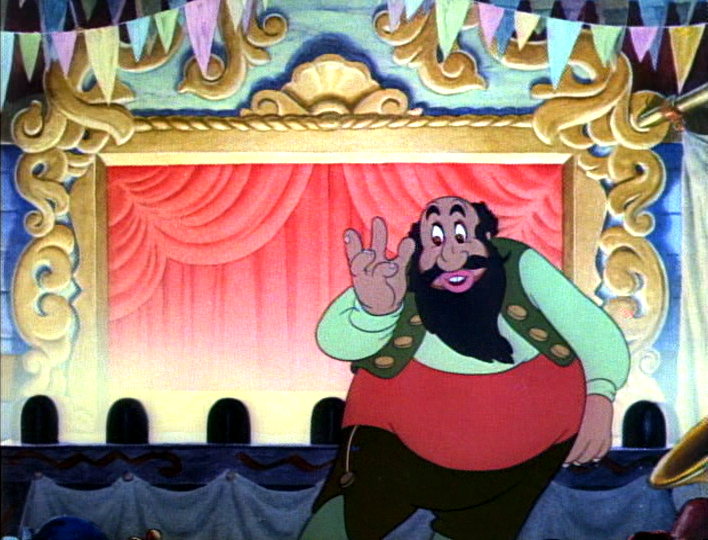
The villainous puppeteer Stromboli in Walt Disney's Pinocchio, primarily animated by Bill Tytla

Snow White and the Seven Dwarfs was eventually completed and premiered/released on December 21, 1937. Tytla was next assigned to animate Stromboli, an explosive puppeteer and kidnapper in Pinocchio. "Bill was powerful, muscular, high-strung and sensitive, with a tremendous ego," wrote Disney animators Frank Thomas and Ollie Johnston in their book The Disney Villain. "Everything was 'feelings' with Bill. Whatever he animated had the inner feelings of his characters expressed through very strong acting. He did not just get inside Stromboli, he was Stromboli and he lived that part." Animator T. Hee saw Tytla so wrapped up in his work, that he quietly scurried out of the room.

Brave Little Tailor was a 1938 short featuring Mickey and Minnie Mouse. Tytla animated the giant who was as dumb as he was huge. The character "became the model for all giants throughout the industry from gags to personality," according to Johnston and Thomas. The short was nominated for the Academy Award for Animated Short Film of 1939. But it lost to Ferdinand the Bull, another Disney short, directed by Dick Rickard, animated by Milt Kahl and Ward Kimball.

Early in 1938, Tytla animated Yen Sid, the old magician in "The Sorcerer's Apprentice", which would eventually become a segment in Fantasia. However the character from Fantasia which Tytla is better known for is Chernabog, an adaptation of Crnobog the Black God, from the "Night on Bald Mountain/Ave Maria" sequence. It is often said that Chernabog was based on actor Bela Lugosi, and Walt did bring him in to do live-action reference for the character. However, Tytla already had a good idea of what he wanted to do and did not like Lugosi's interpretation of the character. Instead he had Wilfred Jackson (who is credited for the music of Steamboat Willie) act out the part for him, and that is what he used as a live-action reference.

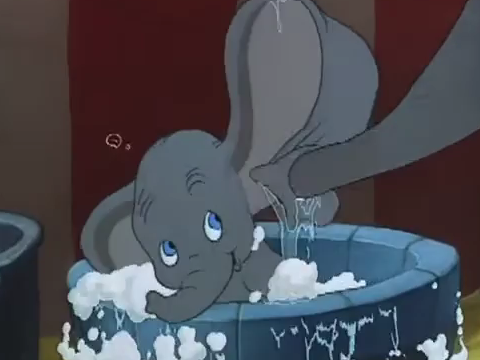
The baby elephant Dumbo with oversized ears, animated by Bill Tytla based on his infant son Peter

Not one to want to be typecast as an animator who only worked the strongest characters, Tytla requested as his next assignment Dumbo, the baby elephant ridiculed and rejected because of his big ears. This time, his reference was his infant son Peter. The intent was to do something nontheatrical and sincere, to try to put the personality of a human child into that of an elephant so that it rings true. As an adult, Peter became a collage artist focusing on images made from photographs of junk cars.

== The strike ==
While Snow White and the Seven Dwarfs was hugely successful the following films had a hard time making money due to the war in Europe cutting of nearly 50% of their revenue. This led to staff layoff and broken promises with regard to job security, raises and bonuses.

While the top animators like Tytla and Babbitt were highly paid, they were all too aware of the low wages being paid to assistants and Film production people. Babbitt even went as far as paying his assistant out of his own pocket. But in early 1941, Babbitt was fired for union activities. The day after Babbitt led over 300 Disney studio employees in a strike, demanding union representation. To Disney's surprise and dismay, Tytla joined the strike line. "I was for the company union, and I went on strike because my friends were on strike," said Tytla. "I was sympathetic with their views, but I never wanted to do anything against Walt." The strike lasted over two months and was so divisive that it profoundly altered the course of American character animation. As the strike ended, America entered World War II and the Golden age was effectively over.

Tytla returned to the studio, but "there was too much tension and electricity in the air," according to Adrianne Tytla. With Vladimir, "everything was instinctive and intuitive, and now the vibes were all wrong." Due to the economics of the studio at the time, assignments were less challenging. In Saludos Amigos Tytla animated Pedro (a baby airplane) and Jose Carioca (a Brazilian parrot). His small and final portrayals at Disney were a witch and a Nazi teacher in the short Education for Death and the climactic battle between a giant octopus and an American eagle in the feature Victory Through Air Power. Tytla's perception that he was unwelcome at the studio, less challenging work, his wife's three-year-long illness with tuberculosis, fear of Japanese attack, and a desire to live on his Connecticut farm eventually led him to the decision to leave the studio. He resigned from the Disney studio on February 24, 1943, an action he regretted for the remainder of his life.

== Work at Terrytoons and Famous Studios ==
After leaving the Disney studio, Tytla returned to Terrytoons for a short while. There he was assigned as a film director for the short The Sultan's Birthday (1944). Tytla soon left Terrytoons but would continue to act as a director for the rest of his animation career.

His next employer was Famous Studios, owned by Paramount Pictures. His directorial efforts there include several shorts:

- Starring Little Lulu.
  - Snap Happy (June 22, 1945).
  - Bored of Education (March 1, 1946).
  - A Scout with the Gout (March 24, 1947).
  - Super Lulu (November 21, 1947).
- Starring Popeye.
  - Service with a Guile (April 19, 1946).
  - Rocket to Mars (August 9, 1946).
  - Island Fling (December 27, 1946).
  - Popeye Meets Hercules (June 18, 1948).
  - Tar with a Star (August 12, 1949).
  - Jitterbug Jive (June 23, 1950).
- Noveltoons featuring Little Audrey.
  - The Lost Dream (March 18, 1949).
  - Song of the Birds (November 18, 1949).
  - Tarts and Flowers (May 26, 1950).
  - Goofy Goofy Gander (August 18, 1950).
- Starring Casper the Friendly Ghost.
  - Casper's Spree Under the Sea (October 13, 1950).
  - Ghost Writers (April 25, 1958) (directed by Seymour Kneitel, Izzy Sparber and him).
- Noveltoons featuring Paddy.
  - The Wee Men (August 8, 1947).
  - Leprechaun's Gold (October 14, 1949).
- Noveltoon featuring Timothy Turkey:
  - Voice of the Turkey (October 13, 1950).
- Noveltoons featuring all the characters:
  - Sudden Fried Chicken featuring Herman and Henry (October 18, 1946)
  - We're in the Honey (March 19, 1948).
  - The Bored Cuckoo (April 9, 1948).
  - The Mite Makes Right (October 15, 1948).
  - Hector's Hectic Life (November 19, 1948).
  - Campus Capers featuring Herman (July 1, 1949)

His own daughter Tammy reportedly provided inspiration for the Little Lulu and Little Audrey shorts. She would later pursue a career as an artist and photographer, known as Tamara Schacher-Tytla.

== Work at Tempo Productions ==
Tytla left Famous Studios during the early 1950s to work for Tempo Productions. Tempo was founded in 1946 as a partnership between David Hilberman and Zack Schwartz. They were both former Disney colleagues of Tytla. David had notably served as an art director for Bambi and Zack for "The Sorcerer's Apprentice". They were among the founders of the United Productions of America but later sold their shares to their partner Stephen Bosustow.

At first the two intended to produce educational films but soon found there was only a limited market for them. However Jack Zander, head of the animation department of Transfilm Inc., which produced television commercials, approached them with an offer to produce animated advertisements for his company. They were at first assigned to advertise Camel cigarettes. Later their assignments included Standard Brands, Plymouth automobile, National Dairy Association, Tide and Clark Gum Company. Zack Schwartz had left the company in 1948/1949 but assignments continued. David Hilberman decided to expand the staff. The expansion included hiring Tytla as advertisement director.

The squared-off stylized designs reportedly frustrated Tytla. But he produced some good work there including some stop motion animation. His animated advertisements though are perhaps the least well-remembered part of his career. When the revival of interest in classical animation started in the 1980s, they were long unavailable to audiences, presumably lost. A reason for this was that Tempo proved short-lived, blacklisted during the Red Scare of the early 1950s.

Tytla, however took time to visit his former colleagues at Disney in 1954. Unlike Babbitt he was welcome to do so and even had his picture taken with his old boss Walt. In a letter to Marc Davis written in December 1954, Tytla said "What a helluva swell time I had, It did me a world of good".

== Later years ==
His next sources of employment were animated series. He is credited as director for episodes of four different series:

- Popeye (September 10, 1956 –September 28, 1963).
- Deputy Dawg (September 5, 1959 – 1972).
- Matty's Funday Funnies (featuring Beany and Cecil by Bob Clampett, October 11, 1959 – 1962).
- The New Casper Cartoon Show (1963–1969).

He also took time to create one last short for Terrytoons, First Flight Up (1962). His last work of animation on a film was for Warner Bros. Cartoons on The Incredible Mr. Limpet, a comedy feature film mixing live action and animation, directed by Arthur Lubin and starring Don Knotts as a fish. However, during this time Tytla became ill and a lot of the actual animation was completed by animation director Robert McKimson, Hawley Pratt and Gerry Chiniquy. All three of them are better known for their Looney Tunes work. Tytla had also been working on the idea for an animated movie called "Mousthusula, the 2000 Year Old Mouse", but could not find anyone being interested.

Following this Tytla suffered many small strokes, which left him blind in his left eye. On August 13, 1967, the opening night of the Montreal Expo's World Exhibition of Animation Cinema, featured a screening of Dumbo as part of an Hommage Aux Pionniers. Tytla was invited, but worried if anyone would remember him. When the film finished, they announced the presence of "The Great Animator." When the spotlight finally found him, the audience erupted in "a huge outpouring of love. It may have been one of the great moments of his life," recalled animation historian John Culhane.

In a letter dated August 27, 1968, W.H. Anderson, then-Vice President of Walt Disney Productions, rejected Tytla's offer to do "trial animation", saying, "We really have only enough animation for our present staff." And as late as October 11, 1968, less than three months before Tytla's death, Disney director Wolfgang Reitherman responded to story material Tytla submitted explaining "... I'm sorry to say that your story ideas don't fit into our present program.. We have not forgotten that you are anxious to animate here at the studio, but ... So far, we can just barely keep our present crew of animators busy ... rest assured you have many friends here at the studio who are pulling for you."

After briefly working at Hanna-Barbera, and directing The Lone Ranger cartoon for Format Films, Vladimir Tytla died on his farm on December 30, 1968, aged 64. He was an atheist.

== Filmography ==
| Year | Title | Credits | Characters | Notes |
|---|---|---|---|---|
| 1937 | Snow White and the Seven Dwarfs | Supervising Animator | | Credited as Vladimir Tytla |
| 1940 | Pinocchio | Animation Director | | Credited as Vladimir Tytla |
| 1940 | Fantasia | Animation Supervisor - Segments "The Sorcerer's Apprentice" and "Night on Bald Mountain/Ave Maria" | | Credited as Vladimir Tytla |
| 1941 | Dumbo | Animation Director | | Credited as Vladimir Tytla |
| 1943 | Saludos Amigos | Animator | | |
| 1943 | Victory Through Air Power (Documentary) | Animator | | |
| 1945 | Snap Happy (Short) | Director | | |
| 1946 | Bored of Education (Short) | Director | | |
| 1946 | Service with a Guile (Short) | Director | | |
| 1946 | Rocket to Mars (Short) | Director | | |
| 1946 | Sudden Fried Chicken (Short) | Director | | |
| 1946 | The Island Fling (Short) | Director | | |
| 1947 | A Scout with the Gout (Short) | Director | | |
| 1947 | The Wee Men (Short) | Director | | |
| 1947 | Super Lulu (Short) | Director | | |
| 1948 | We're in the Honey (Short) | Director | | |
| 1948 | The Bored Cuckoo (Short) | Director | | |
| 1948 | Popeye Meets Hercules (Short) | Director | | |
| 1948 | The Mite Makes Right (Short) | Director | | |
| 1948 | Hector's Hectic Life (Short) | Director | | |
| 1949 | The Lost Dream (Short) | Director | | |
| 1949 | Campus Capers (Short) | Director | | |
| 1949 | Tar with a Star (Short) | Director | | |
| 1949 | Leprechauns Gold (Short) | Director | | |
| 1949 | Song of the Birds (Short) | Director | | |
| 1950 | Tarts and Flowers (Short) | Director | | |
| 1950 | Jitterbug Jive (Short) | Director | | |
| 1950 | Goofy Goofy Gander (Short) | Director | | |
| 1950 | The Voice of the Turkey (Short) | Director | | |
| 1950 | Casper's Spree Under the Sea (Short) | Director | | |
| 1956 | The Magical World of Disney (TV Series) | Animator - "The Plausible Impossible" | | |
| 1964 | The Incredible Mr. Limpet | Supervising Animation Director: Special Piscatorial Effects | | |
| 2000 | Fantasia 2000 | Animation Supervisor - Segment "The Sorcerer's Apprentice" | | Credited as Vladimir Tytla |

== See also ==
- Golden age of American animation
- Walt Disney Animation Studios
- List of animators
