= Olive Oyl for President =

- Directed by: I. Sparber; Animation Director: Tom Johnson (uncredited)
- Story by: Joe Stultz; Larry Riley
- Produced by: I. Sparber; Seymour Kneitel; Executive Producer: Sam Buchwald (all uncredited)
- Starring: Jack Mercer; Mae Questel; Jackson Beck; Sid Raymond (all uncredited)
- Music by: Winston Sharples
- Animation by: Tom Johnson; John Gentilella; Frank Endres (unc.); Els Barthen (unc.)
- Backgrounds by: Tom Ford (scenic artist)
- Color process: Cinecolor
- Production company: Famous Studios
- Distributed by: Paramount Pictures
- Release date: January 30, 1948 (USA)
- Running time: 6 min. (one reel)
- Language: English

Olive Oyl for President is a 1948 entry in the Popeye the Sailor animated short subject series, produced by Famous Studios and released on January 30, 1948 by Paramount Pictures. The short is a reworking of a 1932 Betty Boop cartoon, Betty Boop for President, and depicts what Popeye imagines the world would be like if Olive Oyl were president.

== Synopsis ==
The downtown streets of Popeye and Olive Oyl's town are flooded with crowds who have turned out to hear various presidential candidates trying to convince voters to elect them to the White House. Olive wonders aloud why no women are running for president, to which Popeye replies, "because they're too busy runnin' fer huskbands!"

Undaunted, Olive is certain what the United States needs is a female president, an idea Popeye ridicules mercilessly. Olive beans Popeye over the head with a frying pan, and shouts "Yes, if I were President..."

Unconscious, Popeye suddenly finds himself in a fantasy world where Olive herself is on stage appealing to voters in song. Olive promises luxuries such as clean streets decorated with bows, giant ice cream cones for children (including Little Audrey), and creative solutions to public transportation and housing shortages. She has a "special Cabinet" composed of handsome male film stars Alan Ladd, Bing Crosby, Bob Hope, William Holden, and Ray Milland. The once skeptical Popeye now applauds his girlfriend's dream, and, to his delight, Olive wins the election. She becomes the country's first female President, and quickly tames a Congress populated with literal representations of the two major political parties: donkey Democrats and elephant Republicans).

Popeye awakens from his dream with a changed heart, and Olive Oyl soon finds herself riding a parade float, dressed as the Statue of Liberty. Standing beside her, an enthusiastic Popeye shouts into the crowd as a mock auctioneer, "For Presidink...Olive Oyl... Sold to America!"

== Voice Cast ==
- Jack Mercer as Popeye the Sailor
- Mae Questel as Olive Oyl
- Jackson Beck as Gibberish-Speaking Candidate
- Sid Raymond as Additional Voices

== Notes and comments ==
Many of the gags and situations in Olive Oyl for President are reworked from Betty Boop for President, produced by Famous Studios' predecessor Fleischer Studios in 1932. Newly created Famous cartoon character Little Audrey from the Noveltoon Santa's Surprise is seen briefly licking a giant ice cream cone; Audrey's first starring short, Butterscotch and Soda, would be released six months after Olive Oyl for President. Olive Oyl for President was also double-featured with the Little Lulu short, The Dog Show-Off, which was the final Little Lulu short after Famous Studios decided not to renew the license to Marjorie Henderson Buell for the Little Lulu character, and had created Little Audrey (as mentioned before). All five cartoons shared the same voice actress, Mae Questel.

Olive Oyl's version of the "If I Were President" song (an earlier version appeared in Betty Boop for President) was parodied in a track of the same name from Bizarre Ride II the Pharcyde, the 1992 debut album by hip hop group The Pharcyde.

It is also the Popeye cartoon whose ending title music was reused in many A.A.P. Popeye TV prints, but in the DVD/Blu-ray version, Popeye the Sailor: The 1940s, Volume 3, the ending music from Abusement Park was used instead.
