= Betty Boop for President =

1932 American animated short film

- Directed by: Dave Fleischer
- Produced by: Max Fleischer
- Starring: Mae Questel
- Music by: Sammy Timberg
- Animation by: Seymour Kneitel; Roland Crandall; Bernard Wolf (uncredited)
- Color process: Black-and-white
- Production company: Fleischer Studios
- Distributed by: Paramount Pictures
- Release date: November 4, 1932
- Running time: 7 mins (one reel)
- Language: English

Betty Boop for President is a 1932 Fleischer Studios animated short film starring Betty Boop. It was released by Paramount Pictures on November 4, 1932, four days before that year's presidential election day.

== Plot ==
Betty runs for the office of President against Mr. Nobody. Both candidates state their platform through song and dance.

In answer to various problems and political issues, Mr. Nobody consistently promises that "nobody" will solve the problem:

Who will make your taxes light?... Mr. Nobody!
Who'll protect the voters' right?... Mr. Nobody!
Should you come home some early dawn,
Find a new milkman is on:
Who cares if your wife is gone?... Mr. Nobody

Betty's promises for improvements are shown, including door to door trolley stops, improved conditions for keeping the streets clean, and even a giant umbrella to protect the whole city from rain. Betty also promises to tame a split and incorrigible Congress made up of donkey Democrats and elephant Republicans, and offers a simple solution for prison reform: she will transform each hardened criminal into a limp-wristed sissy.

Betty's campaign promises win the crowd over, and she is voted into the White House by a landslide. A large parade is held in the new President's honor, as she thanks one and all. The film ends with a static shot of a glass of beer, possibly indicating that Betty will also end prohibition.

== Notes and comments ==
- Betty Boop briefly morphs into caricatures of Herbert Hoover and Al Smith. Smith was the Democratic Party candidate in 1928 and was widely expected to run again, but the nominee would end up being Franklin D. Roosevelt. The use of Smith in the cartoon was probably the result in the lead time needed to animate the cartoon before it appeared in theaters.
- The cartoon ends with the image of a glass of beer; repeal or modification of Prohibition in the United States was a major contemporary issue.
- Betty Boop for President was reworked by the Fleischer staff sixteen years later, when the studio, by then known as Famous Studios, produced a Popeye the Sailor cartoon entitled Olive Oyl for President. This 1948 short reuses many of the gags, as well as a reworked version of Betty's "If I Were President" song, applying them to a fantasy story about Olive Oyl running for president.
- The "Nobody for President" slogan was later taken up by hippie activist and entertainer Wavy Gravy.
- It is the first depiction of a fictional president to appear on screen.

== Remake ==
There is a film called Hurray for Betty Boop made in 1980, based on this short's running-for-office premise. Record producer Dan Dalton took scenes from over 30 Korean-colorized 1930s Betty Boop cartoons and wrote a connecting narrative to make this feature. He employed the voice-acting talents of Tommy Smothers and Victoria D'Orazi, and songs by Debby Boone, Cab Calloway, and The Association. Dalton claimed "it was difficult to keep the continuity" to Fleischer authority Michael Dobbs. Dalton explicitly asserted in 1982 that New Line Cinema's lack of promotion was from the film's failure to receive a theatrical release. It only made its home video release by Warner Home Video in 1984 before it was stored away in obscurity resulting its negative reception.

This 90-minute film finally received a DVD release in 2004, under the name Betty Boop for President, on the Brentwood Home Video imprint. Despite this, Dalton uploaded the abandoned compilation film on social media in March 2016.
