= Richie Rich (1996 TV series) =

- Created by: Warren Kremer; Sid Jacobson
- Based on: Richie Rich by: Alfred Harvey; Warren Kremer
- Starring: Katie Leigh; René Auberjonois; Jeannie Elias; Patrick Fraley; Martin Jarvis; Susan Silo
- Country of origin: United States
- Original language: English
- No. of seasons: 1
- No. of episodes: 13

Production
- Running time: 30 minutes
- Production companies: Jeffrey A. Montgomery Productions; The Harvey Entertainment Company; Film Roman

Original release
- Network: Syndication
- Release: September 14 – December 7, 1996

Richie Rich is a 1996 animated television series produced by The Harvey Entertainment Company and Film Roman and distributed by Claster Television. It is based on the Harvey Comics character of the same name. It aired for one season, and also includes select Harveytoons shorts.

Unlike the Hanna-Barbera version which depicted a somewhat older Richie closer to adolescence, this revival series was more faithful to the comics, as Richie Rich appeared in his original form as a younger child in his tuxedo and shorts.

== Voices ==
- Katie Leigh – Richie Rich, Irona
- René Auberjonois – Richard Rich, Chef Pierre, Professor Keenbean
- Jeannie Elias – Tiny, Freckles, Reggie Van Dough, Gloria Glad
- Patrick Fraley – Dollar the Dog
- Martin Jarvis – Cadbury, Bascomb
- Susan Silo – Regina Rich

== Crew ==
- Susan Blu – voice director

== Production ==
In November 1993, it was reported that Harvey Comics would be launching a new Richie Rich animated series to follow on from the feature film in development from Warner Bros. Pictures.

== Episodes ==
13 episodes were produced, with each one split into three segments. The first segment is always a new Richie Rich short; the second and third segments in Episodes 1-12 were original Harveytoon cartoons (in the same manner as The Baby Huey Show). The second segment was always a Herman and Katnip cartoon (or at least featured one of the duo), while the third segment featured Little Audrey cartoons for Episodes 1-9 and miscellaneous cartoons for Episodes 10-12. Episode 13 replaced both segments for original cartoons with reruns of a previous Richie Rich short.

Episode List
Episode Number	Segment A	Segment B	Segment C	Airdate
1	Richie Rich: One of a Kind	Herman and Katnip: Will Do Mousework (1956)	Harvey Girls featuring Little Audrey: The Seapreme Court (1954)	September 14, 1996
2	Richie Rich: Nothing to Hiccup At	Harveytoons: Cat Tamale featuring Herman and Katnip (1952)	Harvey Girls featuring Little Audrey: Dawg Gone (1958)	September 21, 1996
3	Richie Rich: Richie's Great Race	Herman and Katnip: Of Mice and Menace (1954)	Harvey Girls featuring Little Audrey: The Case of the Cockeyed Canary (1952, Academy Award-submitted short)	September 28, 1996
4	Richie Rich: Girls Only	Herman and Katnip: Mice Capades (1952, Academy Award-submitted short)	Harvey Girls featuring Little Audrey: Dizzy Dishes (1954, Academy Award-submitted short)	October 5, 1996
5	Richie Rich: Rich and Chocolatey	Herman and Katnip: From Mad to Worse (1957)	Harvey Girls featuring Little Audrey: Audrey the Rainmaker (1951, banned cameo character, Aunt Petunia, cut)	October 26, 1996
6	Richie Rich: Richie's Circus	Herman and Katnip: Drinks on the Mouse (1953, censored)	Harvey Girls featuring Little Audrey: Surf Bored (1953)	October 12, 1996
7	Richie Rich: Dognapped	Harveytoons: Mice Paradise featuring Herman (1951)	Harvey Girls featuring Little Audrey: Law and Audrey (1952)	October 19, 1996
8	Richie Rich: Back in the Saddle	Harveytoons: City Kitty (1952, featuring Katnip)	Harvey Girls featuring Little Audrey: Little Audrey Riding Hood (1955)	November 2, 1996
9	Richie Rich: Roughin' It (a.k.a. Pampered Campers)	Herman and Katnip: Mousier Herman (1955, Academy Award-submitted short)	Harvey Girls featuring Little Audrey: Fishing Tackler (1957)	November 9, 1996
10	Richie Rich: Bugged Out	Herman and Katnip: Mousestro Herman (1956, Academy Award-submitted short)	Modern Madcaps: T.V. Fuddlehead (1959, Academy Award-submitted short)	November 16, 1996
11	Richie Rich: Invasion of the Cadbury Robots (a.k.a. Cadbury Overload)	Herman and Katnip: Felineous Assault (1959, Academy Award-submitted short)	Harveytoons: Feast and Furious featuring Finny (1952)	November 23, 1996
12	Richie Rich: The Love Potion	Harveytoons: Mice Meeting You featuring Herman (1950)	Harveytoons: Jolly the Clown (1957)	November 30, 1996
13	Richie Rich: Cleaned Out	Richie Rich: Back in the Saddle (rerun)	Richie Rich: Rich and Chocolatey (rerun)	December 7, 1996

== Broadcast ==
The series was broadcast in the United States through broadcast syndication beginning September 21, 1996 airing as part of the weekday cartoon block Power Block where it was paired with All Dogs Go to Heaven: The Series and Vor-Tech: Undercover Conversion Squad.

== Syndication ==
Minisodes of the show are available for streaming for free in the US on Sony owned Crackle. In addition, all full-length episodes (except "Cleaned Out") are available to watch on Amazon Video as The Richie Rich Collection. As of now, the episodes are occasionally aired on MeTV Toons as part of the Casper and Company block.
