= The New Casper Cartoon Show =

American animated television series

- Genre: Animation
- Directed by: Seymour Kneitel
- Voices of: Norma MacMillan; Bradley Bolke; Jack Mercer
- Composer: Winston Sharples
- Country of origin: United States
- Original language: English
- No. of seasons: 1
- No. of episodes: 26

Production
- Executive producer: Alfred Harvey
- Producers: Leon Harvey; Robert Harvey
- Running time: 30 minutes
- Production companies: Paramount Cartoon Studios; Harvey Funnies

Original release
- Network: ABC
- Release: September 7, 1963 – February 29, 1964

Related
- Matty's Funday Funnies; Casper and the Angels; The Harveytoons Show

The New Casper Cartoon Show is a 1963–1964 animated television series that appeared on ABC's Saturday morning schedule, based on the Famous Studios cartoon character Casper the Friendly Ghost. Casper's co-stars included his friends from the Harvey Comics stories: Wendy the Good Little Witch, the Ghostly Trio, Spooky the Tuff Little Ghost, and the ghost horse Nightmare. The show premiered on October 5, 1963 and is one of the earliest Saturday morning cartoons.

The show included a mix of 26 new Casper cartoons created for this show by Paramount Cartoon Studios, who had previously sold the characters to Harvey, as well as a selection of 1959–62 cartoons from the aforementioned Paramount, which were mostly the later Modern Madcaps and Noveltoons (the latter series repackaged as "Modern Madcaps"). Most voices in the newly-produced Casper episodes were performed by Norma MacMillan and Bradley Bolke.

All of the new material was created for the first season in 1963-1964, but the show continued airing in reruns on ABC for six seasons, ending on January 30, 1970.

Later, in early 1976, the 26 episodes were packaged for syndication along with the theatrical Casper shorts.

== Episodes ==
All directed by Seymour Kneitel, and all with music by Winston Sharples and graphic arts by Warren Kremer.

No.	Title	Animated by	Directed by	Scenics	Original release date
1	"The Greedy Giants"	Shamus Culhane	Seymour Kneitel	Robert Little	September 7, 1963
Casper's new friend the Weeping Willow is tired of being teased by the other trees, and the little ghost decides to help him.
2	"Red Robbing Hood"	Tom Golden	Seymour Kneitel	Robert Little	September 14, 1963
Casper must help the good vigilante Red Robbing Hood win his throne back from his evil cousin.
3	"The Lonesome Giant"	Shamus Culhane	Seymour Kneitel	Anton Loeb	September 21, 1963
Casper meets a giant with no friends, and introduces him to the forest animals, but the animals aren't so sure they want to be friends with a giant.
4	"A Visit from Mars"	Martin Taras	Seymour Kneitel	Robert Little	September 28, 1963
When a little Martian boy playing hooky crashes his "borrowed" saucer into the house, Casper shows him around, but the Martians are convinced that the saucer was stolen by humans and declare war on the Earth.
5	"Bedtime Trouble"	Chuck Harriton	Seymour Kneitel	Robert Little	October 5, 1963
After the Trio's racket drives Casper from his bed, the friendly ghost encounters a Bear with insomnia. He enlists the help of the Sandman, but the bear seems incurable.
6	"The Bored Billionaire"	Graham Place	Seymour Kneitel	Anton Loeb	October 12, 1963
Casper saves a billionaire from a witch.
7	"City Snicker"	Shamus Culhane	Seymour Kneitel	Anton Loeb	October 19, 1963
Casper meets his cousin, Spooky and befriends him. That night, Spooky gets frightened by strange noises and Casper wants to protect Spooky.
8	"Cold Wave"	Shamus Culhane	Seymour Kneitel	Anton Loeb	October 26, 1963
Casper must foil the plans of an evil scientist who is trying to block the light of the sun from reaching Earth.
9	"Growing Up"	Gordon Whittier	Seymour Kneitel	Anton Loeb	November 2, 1963
The Ghostly Trio make mischief by slipping Casper an enlarging potion.
10	"Kings of Toyland"	Graham Place	Seymour Kneitel	Anton Loeb	November 9, 1963
Casper settles a war between the Blue King and the Red King.
11	"Little Lost Ghost"	Gordon Whittier	Seymour Kneitel	Robert Little	November 16, 1963
Casper helps a lost ghost named Something to find his mother.
12	"Mother Goose Land"	Tom Golden	Seymour Kneitel	Anton Loeb	November 23, 1963
The Ghostly Trio are running amok in Mother Goose Land, and its up to Casper and Wendy to stop their fun.
13	"The Professor's Problem"	Tom Golden	Seymour Kneitel	Robert Little	November 30, 1963
Casper helps a professor get to the moon, with the help of his horse Nightmare.
14	"Small Spooks"	Martin Taras	Seymour Kneitel	Anton Loeb	December 7, 1963
The Trio see Casper reading a book about insects and decide if they could become tiny, they could spook all the insects in the Enchanted Forest. Fatso tricks Casper into getting them some magic reducing pills from the witches.
15	"Super Spooks"	Chuck Harriton	Seymour Kneitel	Anton Loeb	December 14, 1963
Casper's lookalike - but big and muscular - cousin Powerhouse drops by for a visit, and they team up to scare the Ghostly Trio into ending their bullying ways.
16	"The Absent-Minded Robot"	Nick Tafuri	Seymour Kneitel	Anton Loeb	December 21, 1963
Casper meets Robbie, a "misfit robot", who's been kicked out of the robot factory for being chronically absent-minded. The ghost helps Robbie to make some new friends in the forest.
17	"The Enchanted Horse"	Tom Golden	Seymour Kneitel	Anton Loeb	December 28, 1963
The evil Eastern magician Ali Booboo feeds an ensorcelled apple to Nightmare, turning her into his slave. Casper and Wendy must pursue Booboo to his castle in the clouds to rescue their friend.
18	"The Enchanted Prince"	Tom Golden	Seymour Kneitel	Anton Loeb	January 4, 1964
Wendy helps Casper remove a spell from a prince.
19	"The Heart of Gold"	Shamus Culhane	Seymour Kneitel	Robert Little	January 11, 1964
Midas the Miser wishes to rid himself of The Golden Touch, and to do so he must find a heart of gold.
20	"The Magic Touch"	Graham Place	Seymour Kneitel	Anton Loeb	January 18, 1964
Casper tries to help The Great Foozini perform his magic act.
21	"The Timid Knight"	Graham Place	Seymour Kneitel	Robert Little	January 25, 1964
Casper visits King Arthur's castle and scares the knights out of their armor. He tries to help a cowardly knight get courage, thus assisting him in saving the princess from an evil dragon.
22	"The Wandering Ghost"	Chuck Harriton	Seymour Kneitel	Anton Loeb	February 1, 1964
A boatload of Pilgrims is attacked by a sea monster and Casper tries to help them.
23	"The Witching Hour"	Chuck Harriton	Seymour Kneitel	Anton Loeb	February 8, 1964
The Evil Witch had cast a spell on Wendy's house and they ran away. Casper will end the witching hour til everything is back to normal.
24	"Twin Trouble"	Tom Golden	Seymour Kneitel	Anton Loeb	February 15, 1964
Wendy's aunts and Casper's uncles magic up mischievous twins of Casper and Wendy to cause trouble around the Enchanted Forest.
25	"Weather or Not"	Shamus Culhane	Seymour Kneitel	Robert Little	February 22, 1964
The Ghostly Trio want to go out "booing" in bad weather, so they send Casper out to check the forecast.
26	"Wendy's Wish"	Tom Golden	Seymour Kneitel	Anton Loeb	February 29, 1964
Wendy wishes on a star for new red dancing shoes, but this wish causes an unintentional consequences.

== Home media ==
On October 11, 2011, Shout! Factory released Casper the Friendly Ghost: The Complete Collection 1945–1963 on DVD in Region 1. The 3-disc set features 55 original theatrical cartoons as well as all 26 episodes from The New Casper Cartoon Show on DVD.

== See also ==
- List of ghost films
