= Romper Room =

American children's television series

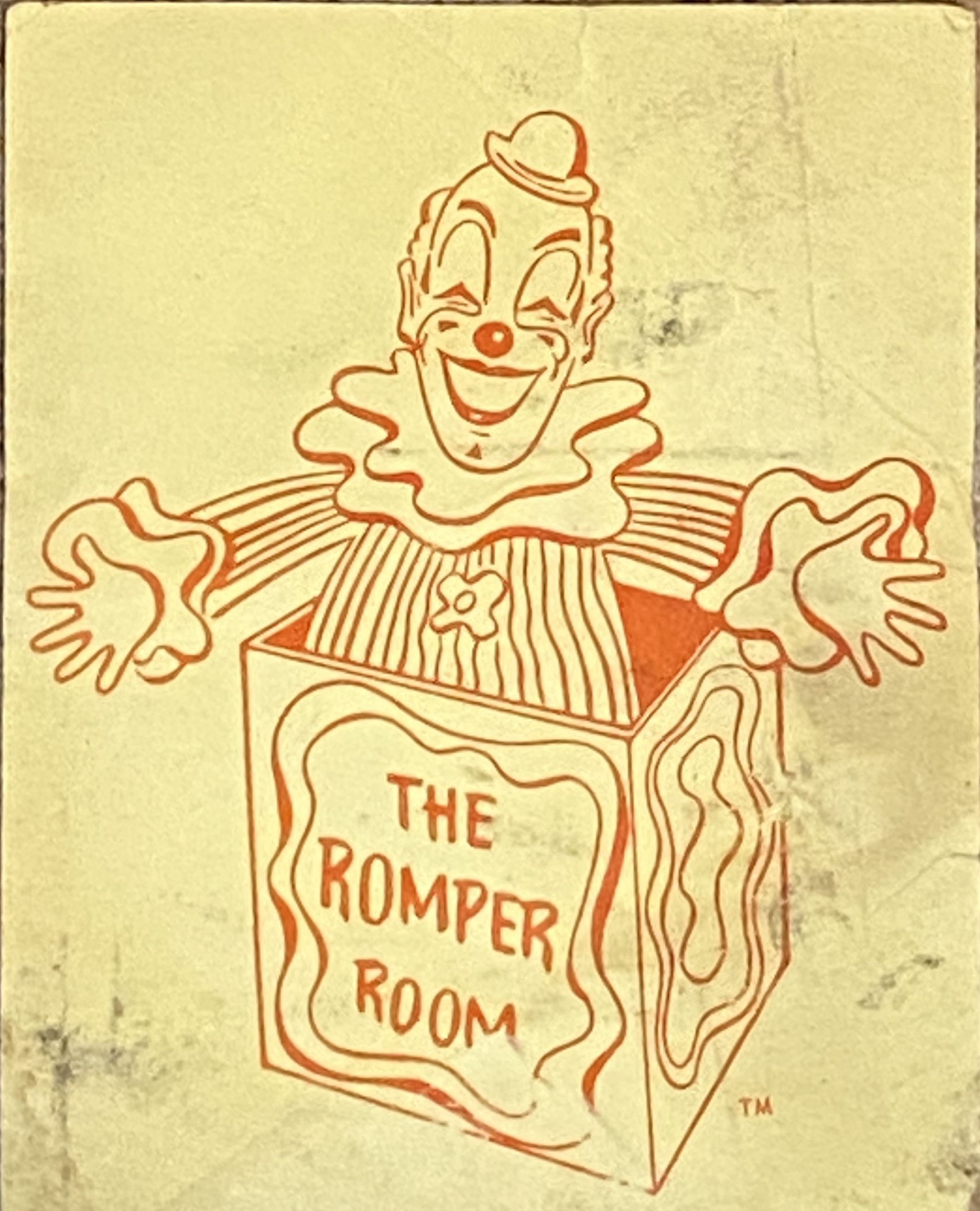
- Postcard sent to a child viewer by Miss Louise of the New York version, 1966
- Genre: Children's television series
- Created by: Bert Claster; Nancy Claster
- Starring: National – Nancy Terrell; Locally and internationally – various presenters
- Country of origin: United States
- Original language: English

Production
- Production company: Claster Television

Original release
- Release: February 10, 1953 – December 20, 1994

Romper Room is an American children's television series that was franchised and syndicated from 1953 to 1994. The program targeted preschoolers (children five years of age or younger), and was created and produced by Bert Claster and his presenter wife, Nancy Claster, of Claster Television. Sally Claster Bell Gelbard, their daughter, later trained hostesses. The national version was presented by Nancy Terrell and filmed in Baltimore from its inception in 1953.

== Television franchises and syndications ==
Romper Room was a rare case of a series being both franchised and syndicated, and some local affiliates—Los Angeles and New York being prime examples—would produce their own versions of the show instead of airing the national telecast. For some time, local shows all over the world used the same script but with local children.

Nancy Cledenin Terrell (born 1940, Richmond, Virginia), known to audiences as "Miss Nancy", was the national hostess in the 1960s and early 1970s, when Romper Room was seen on ABC-owned and operated stations throughout the United States in locales that did not have their own hostesses.

Some affiliates, starting with KWEX-TV in San Antonio, translated the scripts into Spanish for local airings. Kids would be on waiting lists for years (sometimes before birth) to be on the show. When Edna Anderson-Taylor left the KSL-TV version of Romper Room, the waiting list was over three years long. In 1959, John Crosby reported that the waiting list in Baltimore was so long, some of the preschoolers on the waiting list would not have a turn on the show until they were 40.

Some children reportedly reappeared on the show if they were comfortable in front of the camera. The show was called "an actual kindergarten".

Other local affiliates have included: San Francisco, Pittsburgh, Boston, Cleveland, Birmingham, Alabama, and Chicago.

Romper Room was also franchised internationally at various times in Canada, the United Kingdom, Japan, the Philippines, Finland, New Zealand, Puerto Rico, Paraguay, Brazil, Australia, Papua New Guinea, Argentina and Greece.

== Episode format ==
Each program opens with a greeting from the hostess and the Pledge of Allegiance in American broadcasts. The hostess and her group of children then embark on 30 or 60 minutes of games, exercises, songs, story-telling and moral lessons, which were regularly accompanied by background music. The hostess (or sometimes the children in cadence) would ask, "Mr. Music, please!" or "We're ready, Mr. Music", to prompt the background music. The young cast, which ranged from four to five years old, was rotated every two months, with many of the hostesses having prior experience working with small children and many being former kindergarten teachers.

Etiquette was a focus of Romper Room. The hostesses were always addressed as "Miss". The show also had a mascot, Mr. Do-Bee. Mr. Do-Bee was an oversized bumblebee who came to teach the children proper etiquette. He was noted for always starting his sentence with "Do Bee", as in the imperative "Do be"; for example, "Do Bee good boys and girls for your parents!" There was also a "Mr. Don't Bee" to show children exactly what they should not do. Do-Bee balloons were made available for purchase to the public. Each balloon featured a painted sketch of Do-Bee. When the balloons were inflated and then released, they would fly around slowly and emit a buzzing sound.

The hostess would also serve milk and cookies to the children. Before eating, they would recite the celebrated Romper Room grace: "God is great; God is good. Let us thank Him for our food. Amen."

At the end of each broadcast, the hostess would look through a "magic mirror"—actually an open frame with a handle, the size and shape of a hand mirror—and recite the rhyme, "Romper, bomper, stomper boo. Tell me, tell me, tell me, do. Magic Mirror, tell me today, did all my friends have fun at play?" She would then name the children she saw in "television land", saying, for example, "I can see Kathleen and Owen and Julie and Jimmy and Kelly and Tommy and Bobby and Jennifer and Martin" and so forth. Children were encouraged to mail in their names, which would be read on the air (first names only).

The show used the then-popular Mattel Jack-in-the-box (sometimes called "Happy Jack") for its opening and closing titles, with its traditional nursery rhyme "Pop Goes the Weasel" as a theme song, but, from 1981 onwards, a new original theme song was used.

== Romper Room and Friends ==
In 1981, the format of Romper Room was overhauled and re-titled Romper Room and Friends. One hundred syndicated versions were taped in Baltimore with Molly McCloskey (credited as Molly McCloskey-Barber after 1985) as host. At that point, teachers were no longer used. The biggest change to the program was the introduction of a series of new puppet characters, including a full costume character named Kimble and puppets named Granny Cat and Up-Up. Kimble and Up-Up were performed by Bruce Edward Hall and Granny Cat by McCloskey, a.k.a. "Miss Molly". The three characters were developed by The Great Jones Studios in NYC. The new characters starred in a series of vignettes, somewhat similar to the "Neighborhood of Make-Believe" segments on Mister Rogers' Neighborhood, and were meant to introduce or reinforce simple moral lessons. About 100 of these skits — each running three to five minutes — were produced for insertion into local Romper Room programs; the host would introduce each segment and comment after its conclusion.

In addition, a new opening and closing credits sequence, and lyrical theme – "Romper Room and Friends", containing mostly nonsensical lyrics, but also naming the characters Up-Up, Do Bee, Granny Cat, and Kimble in the lyrics as well – were introduced, replacing the "Pop Goes the Weasel" theme that had been used. New songs/music beds were also created and composed by David Spangler including a somber Magic Mirror theme. Two British-made shows, Paddington (narrated by Michael Hordern) and Simon in the Land of Chalk Drawings (narrated by Bernard Cribbins) were also featured.

The last host of the syndicated series was Sharon Jeffery, the only African-American to host the show. Miss Sharon hosted the show from 1987 until the series was last filmed in 1992, although new episodes were aired until 1994. Jeffery's shows were filmed at KTVU in Oakland, California (the longtime San Francisco Bay Area affiliate of the series).

== See also ==
- Ding Dong School
