= Little Audrey =

Fictional character

- Noveltoons character
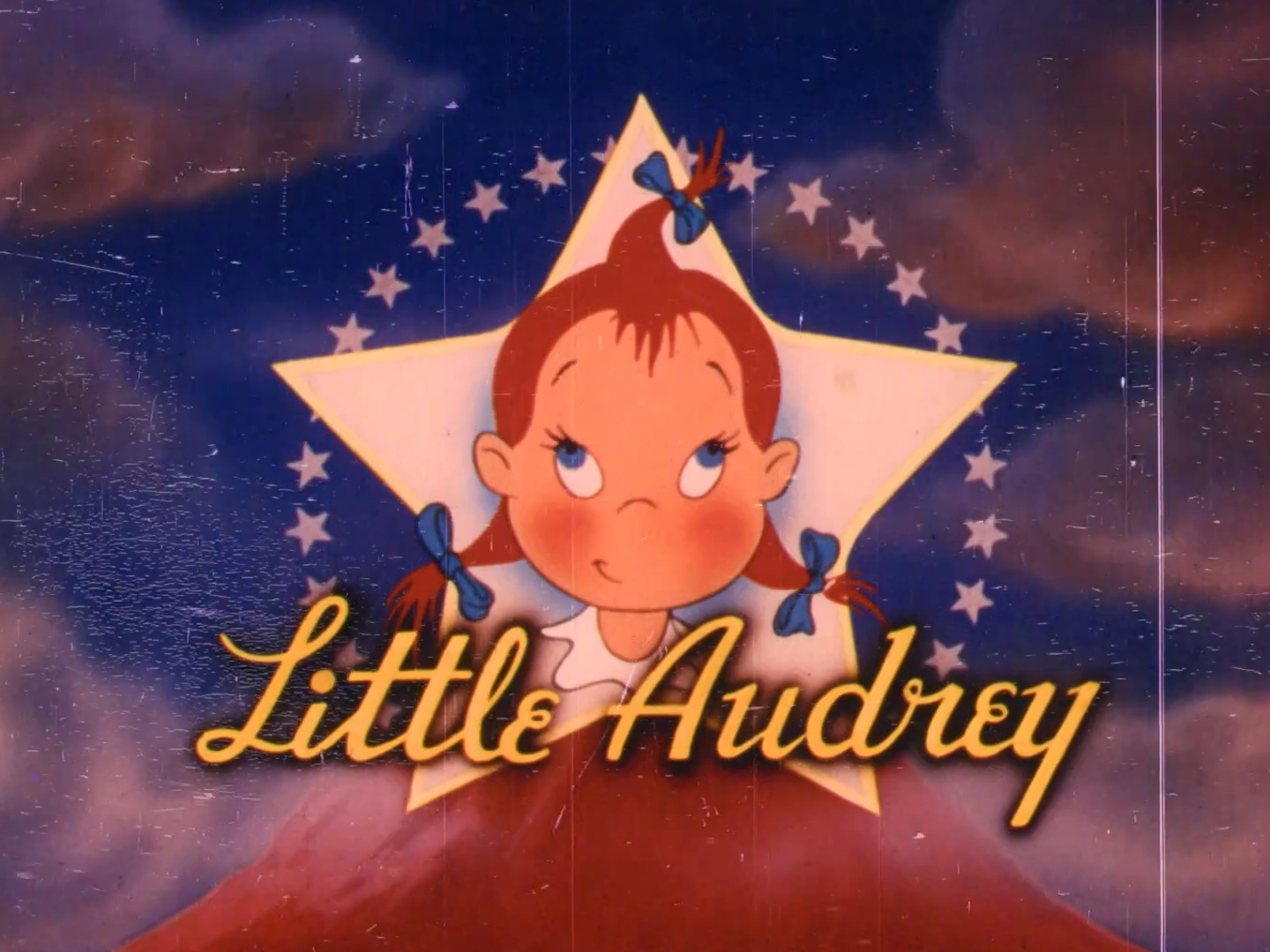
- First appearance: Santa's Surprise (December 5, 1947)
- Created by: Bill Tytla (design)
- Portrayed by: Tiffany Taubman (1999; Baby Huey's Great Easter Adventure)
- Voiced by: Mae Questel (1947–1958); Stephanie Lemelin (2018–2020; Harvey Girls Forever!)

In-universe information
- Alias: Audrey Smith
- Species: Human
- Gender: Female
- Occupation: City girl
- Relatives: Mrs. Smith (mother); Suzie (cousin); Grandma (grandmother); Petunia the Maid (auntie); Pal (dog); Patches (brother); Audrey II (descendant); Zoe (descendant's sister)
- Nationality: American

Audrey Smith, nicknamed Little Audrey, is a fictional animated cartoon character, appearing in early 20th century comics prior to starring in a series of Paramount Pictures' Famous Studios cartoons from 1947 to 1958. She was devised after Paramount decided not to renew the license on Little Lulu, the comic strip character created by Marjorie Henderson Buell (a.k.a. "Marge").

Despite superficial similarities between the characters, the Famous animators were at pains to design Audrey in contrast to Lulu. As opposed to Buell's individualistic rendering of Lulu, the animators adopted an entirely different color scheme for Audrey and employed the stylistic conventions common to Famous Studios' late 1940s repertoire.

Veteran animator Bill Tytla designed Little Audrey, reportedly inspired by his daughter Tammy (also his inspiration for Famous' version of Little Lulu, on which he worked and for which he directed several shorts). The original voice of Little Lulu was performed by actress Cecil Roy (who was also the voice of Casper the Friendly Ghost). Little Audrey was voiced by Mae Questel, whose character voices included Betty Boop, Olive Oyl from the Popeye cartoons, and most of Paramount's other major female cartoon characters.

== History ==
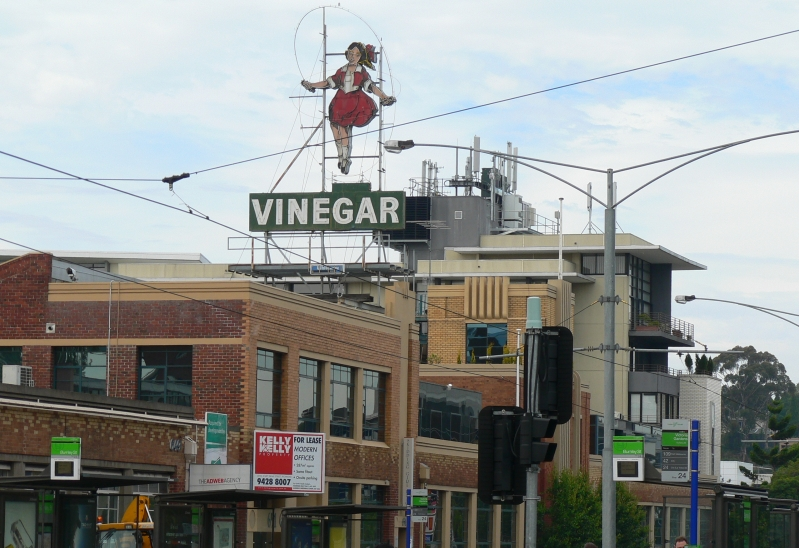
View of the Melbourne, Australia Skipping Girl Sign nicknamed Little Audrey where the jokes were very popular.

Prior to her adoption by Famous in 1947, Little Audrey had a long career in cartoons but also in a series of mostly slapstick gags, some going as far back as the First World War.

=== In cartoons and juvenile humor ===
According to B.A. Botkin's A Treasury of American Folktales:

Little Audrey is a cartoon character about whom thousands of nonsensical short tales during the past five or six years — have been told. Sometimes Little Audrey parades as Little Emma or Little Gertrude, but she usually is recognizable by a catch phrase "she just laughed and laughed." The amusing incident is typically a catastrophe.

One of the most famous:

One day, Li'l Audrey was playing with matches. Her mother told her she'd better stop before someone got hurt. But Li'l Audrey was awfully hard headed and kept playing with matches, and eventually she burned their house down. "Oh, Li'l Audrey, you are sure gonna catch it when your father comes home!" said her mother. But Li'l Audrey just laughed and laughed, because she knew her father had come home early to take a nap.

Pierre Berton, in The Dionne Years: A Thirties Melodrama (1978), offers this example of a Little Audrey joke in fashion around 1934 when the Dionne quintuplets were born:

Li'l Audrey's mother asked her to buy some groceries at the Safeway. But Li'l Audrey just laughed and laughed, because she knew there was no safe way.

=== Animated cartoons ===
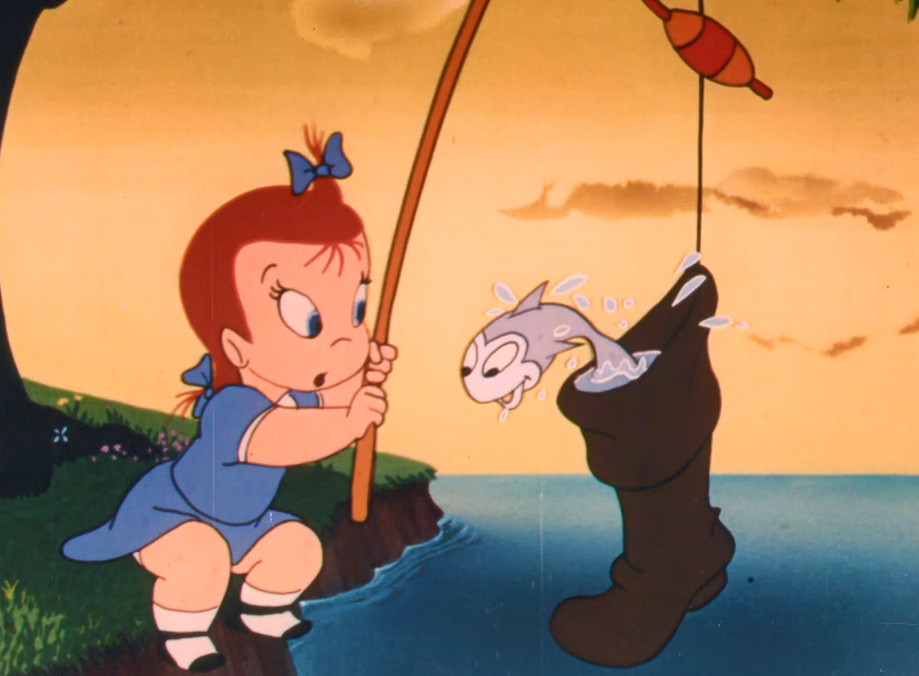
Little Audrey in a scene from "The Seapreme Court" (1954).

Audrey first appeared in the Noveltoon Santa's Surprise (1947), where she was living in Manhattan, New York City, as the most prominent member of a multicultural child cast working to clean Santa's workshop while he was asleep, and was briefly seen in the January 1948 Popeye cartoon Olive Oyl for President. Her solo appearance was the short Butterscotch and Soda, released on July 16, 1948.

In common with many animated shorts of the period, childlike fantasy played an important role in Audrey's early cartoons, which often used dream sequences as the basis of the storylines. In this way, Audrey could attend a wedding in Cakeland (Tarts and Flowers, 1950), ride the clouds with Mother Goose (Goofy Goofy Gander, also 1950), or face an underwater tribunal of outraged catfish (The Seapreme Court, 1954). Slapstick crept into the series with Surf Bored (1953), which pitted the precocious Audrey against a hulking but ultimately brainless lifeguard. A total of 16 cartoons starring Audrey were produced for theatrical release, several of which were re-packaged for television from the late 1950s on.

Audrey was the only character in the series to have her own theme song with vocals ("Little Audrey Says", by Winston Sharples and Buddy Kaye). Some other characters (and certain one-shots) in the series had their own themes, but were entirely instrumental. Two Noveltoons spin-offs, Casper the Friendly Ghost and Herman and Katnip, had their own vocal themes, but only after leaving the series.

For Little Audrey, the pre-October 1950 cartoons were sold in 1956 to television distributor U.M. & M. TV Corporation, which was acquired by National Telefilm Associates the following year. After National Telefilm's failure to renew the copyright for the pre-October 1950 cartoons, they reverted to the public domain. The post-October 1950 cartoons would be sold to Harvey Comics when they acquired the rights to the character in 1959. Today, they are the property of DreamWorks Animation (via DreamWorks Classics), a subsidiary of NBCUniversal distributed by Universal Television. Olive Oyl for President became property of Warner Bros. (via Turner Entertainment Co.) and is distributed by Warner Bros. Television.

Audrey is one of the three (later four) main characters in the DreamWorks Animation Television's animated series Harvey Street Kids, renamed Harvey Girls Forever! in its second season. She is the descendant of Little Audrey, as she wears more contemporary clothing. She has brown hair in the series, more akin to the comics as opposed to red hair as in the theatrical shorts.

Much like her ancestor, Audrey is tomboyish and energetic. She was voiced by Stephanie Lemelin. Some of her companions from the comics, like Melvin Wisenheimer, Tiny, and Lucretia also appeared in Harvey Girls Forever!

== The Famous/Harvey character ==
Little Audrey's last name is Smith. She has reddish-brown hair with ribbons styled in three pigtails (two low, one high). She wears a little dress with puffed sleeves, white ankle socks, and black Mary Jane shoes. In the short subjects, her dress and ribbons are blue, but by the time of her Harvey Comics runs, they are red. In Harvey Street Kids, she wears a pink shirt with jeans.

The comic "Cousin Suzie's Dance Party" (Little Audrey and Melvin #29, March 1967) reveals that Audrey has a cousin named Suzie, who has a friend named Bubu. The first several issues of the comic book also reveals she has a brother nicknamed "Patches".

== In other media ==
While the Little Audrey jokes remained popular well into the 1980s, the Famous/Harvey character had an entirely different career. Little Audrey was going to have a cameo in Who Framed Roger Rabbit, but rights to the character could not be obtained in time.

=== Comic strip ===
Animation historian Jerry Beck notes that Famous Studios' animator Steve Muffatti drew a short-lived "Little Audrey" comic strip for magazines in 1951, which were syndicated by King Features. These strips were also reprinted in 1952-55 by Harvey Comics.

=== Comic books ===
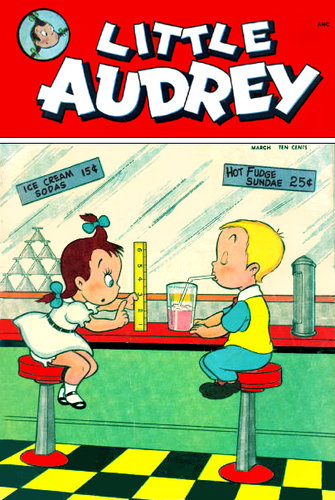
Little Audrey and Patches, as depicted in the St. John Publications series (1948-1952).

Little Audrey was never as successful as Famous' best-known creation, Casper the Friendly Ghost, but the character had considerable success in printed form. The first Little Audrey comic book series was St. John Publications from April 1948 to May 1952. Featuring stories which depended more on situation comedy than on fantasy, the comics featured artwork done in a style approximating the original Famous character designs (most of them by Steve Muffati). The series met with moderate success on the newsstand, running for approximately 24 issues until Little Audrey was licensed by Harvey Comics in 1952.

Initially, Harvey's comic-book version closely followed its animated template, but the character was redesigned during the mid-1950s to conform more closely to the company's in-house style. The general storyline was simultaneously overhauled to provide Audrey with supporting characters such as Melvin Wisenheimer, her prankish arch-enemy/frenemy, and Tiny, an imaginative and eager but somewhat insecure young African American boy. Domestic comedy gradually took over the scripts, as Audrey was shown in conflict with parents, teachers, and other authority figures.

Harvey purchased the rights to all of Famous' original properties - Little Audrey included - in 1958, also acquiring the rights to the post-1950 Audrey cartoons. It was during this time that the "definitive" Audrey came into being, taking on the signature red dress and appearance most often associated with the character. By 1960, Little Audrey was the best known of Harvey's female characters due to her multi-media presence (comic books, television/theatrical animation and - briefly - newspaper strips), although her popularity was later eclipsed by the company's other female characters, Little Dot, Wendy the Good Little Witch and Little Lotta.

Later comic series were titled Playful Little Audrey (the name under which the character had been trademarked in 1961) and Little Audrey & Melvin. In the latter, Audrey and Melvin become less antagonistic and Audrey demonstrates affections for and jealousy towards him, much like Little Lulu had done with Tubby Tompkins.

During her most successful period, Audrey starred in at least four of her own titles and was a back-up feature in Richie Rich, Casper, and Little Dot. The character lasted until 1976, when an industry-wide distribution slump brought an end to most of Harvey's line and most children's comics in general. Since that time, the character has undergone several revivals and made scattered television and video appearances, most notably in The Richie Rich Show (1996) and Baby Huey's Great Easter Adventure (1998).

== Famous Studios filmography ==
All cartoons listed are entries in the series unless otherwise noted. Credited directors for each short are noted.

No.	Title	Directed by	Story by	Animated by	Scenics by	Original release date
1	"Santa's Surprise"	Seymour Kneitel	Larz Bourne	Myron Waldman and Wm. B. Pattengill	Robert Little	December 5, 1947
As Santa delivers presents to Audrey (an all-American girl who lived in Manhattan, New York City) and other children from different countries (a Dutch boy, a Chinese boy, an African boy, a Russian boy, a Hawaiian girl and a Spanish girl), they slip into his sleigh to repay him by cleaning up his house (in this story, poor Santa lives a hermit-like existence, without a wife or elves to help him maintain his household). The kids escape in Santa's sleigh just as he awakes on Christmas morning to find a spotless house and a note that reads, "Don't forget us next year!"
2	"Olive Oyl for President"	I. Sparber	Joe Stultz and Larry Riley	Tom Johnson and John Gentilella	Tom Ford	January 30, 1948
Audrey appears briefly in a sequence where she is seen pushing a baby carriage while licking a gigantic ice cream cone nestled inside of it. Note: Brief cameo in a Popeye the Sailor cartoon. Owned by Turner Entertainment/Skydance Corporation (Paramount Pictures/Warner Bros. Discovery)
3	"Butterscotch and Soda"	Seymour Kneitel	Larz Bourne and Bill Turner	Al Eugster, Bill Hudson, and Irving Spector	Robert Owen	July 16, 1948
Audrey is confined to her room by her family's maid, Petunia (caricature of the black African-American mammy) for wanting to eat candy instead of a nutritionally balanced lunch. She then dreams about going to a candy land (such as the connection of The Lost Weekend), feasting on every scrumptious confection imaginable, and getting sick to her stomach while candy monsters narrate her painful plight in a swing song, admonishing her for the pig she has made of herself, which eventually puts her off sweets.
4	"The Lost Dream"	Bill Tytla	Steve Muffatti, Bill Turner, and Larz Bourne	George Germanetti and Harvey Patterson	Shane Miller	March 18, 1949
Audrey has dreams about how dreams are made and cannot resist the temptation to open the Black Door.
5	"Song of the Birds"	Bill Tytla	Bill Turner and Larry Riley	George Germanetti and Steve Muffatti	Robert Little	November 18, 1949
Audrey is enjoying her air rifle until she shoots down a baby bird and is filled with remorse, then she sees that it survived. The other birds, however, do not believe that she is sincere about her turning over a new leaf (even after she destroys the rifle) until the baby bird proves it. Note: Remake of the Max Fleischer Color Classic cartoon The Song of the Birds (1935).
6	"Tarts and Flowers"	Bill Tytla	Bill Turner and Larry Riley	George Germanetti and Steve Muffatti	Robert Little	May 26, 1950
While waiting for her gingerbread man cake to bake, Audrey dreams about a marriage between the Gingerbread Man and the Angel Food Cake that is about to be terminated by the Devil's Food Cake.
7	"Goofy Goofy Gander"	Bill Tytla	I. Klein	George Germanetti and Steve Muffatti	Anton Loeb	August 18, 1950
When Audrey is sitting in the corner for not paying attention in school, unlike the other kids in the class; she magically shrinks, then Audrey dreams that Mother Goose Land is about to be threatened by a couple of comic book crooks from the Phony Funnies comic book she was reading. Note: Final cartoon in the U.M. & M. TV Corporation package.
8	"Hold the Lion Please"	I. Sparber	I. Klein	Steve Muffatti and George Germanetti	Robert Owen	April 27, 1951
Audrey really wants a pet, but she cannot afford one. At the zoo, she tries to get a baby kangaroo and seal, but their mothers will not let her. Audrey then befriends a lion, who scares away the townspeople. Note: First cartoon in the Harveytoons package.
9	"Audrey the Rainmaker"	I. Sparber	I. Klein	Steve Muffatti and Bill Hudson	Tom Ford	October 26, 1951
Audrey is so annoyed by the rain, she wishes so strongly it would "never rain again" that her wish is granted. Months later, a drought hits the continent hard as a result of her wish and the flowers in her garden are dying. A living drop of water takes her to the Land of the Rainmaker to ask the Rainmaker's forgiveness and to let it rain again.
10	"Law and Audrey"	I. Sparber	I. Klein	Steve Muffatti and Morey Reden	Tom Ford	May 23, 1952
Audrey plays baseball with Pal, but she hurts and angers a policeman several times so that he chases her, but Audrey rescues him from drowning in a pond.
11	"The Case of the Cockeyed Canary"	Seymour Kneitel	I. Klein	Steve Muffatti and Morey Reden	Robert Cannavale	December 19, 1952
Audrey dreams that she is a detective (complete with deerstalker hat) on the case of the murdered Cock Robin. She chases the suspect: a cuckoo bird (a caricature of Harpo Marx). Mary Canary confesses that she only shot Robin with a Cupid arrow.
12	"Surf Bored"	I. Sparber	Larz Bourne	Steve Muffatti and Morey Reden	Robert Cannavale	July 17, 1953
Audrey takes Pal to the beach, regardless that dogs are not allowed. As Audrey tries to incessantly keep Pal, she has to rescue the life guard from a giant octopus.
13	"The Seapreme Court"	Seymour Kneitel	Larz Bourne	Tom Golden and Morey Reden	Robert Owen	January 29, 1954
Audrey falls asleep on a small grass-field island; while fishing, she goes to the sea bed and is tried as a criminal in a fish court of law for the murder of fishes with a fishing hook. When she is sentenced to the eel-lectric chair (a chair made from electric eels), she tries to escape and finds that the events were only a dream.
14	"Dizzy Dishes"	I. Sparber	I. Klein	Tom Golden and Bill Hudson	Anton Loeb	February 4, 1955
While using her contraption to wash dishes for her, Audrey dreams about aliens with the power to disintegrate. Only Audrey, with her superweapons, can stop them.
15	"Little Audrey Riding Hood"	Seymour Kneitel	Larz Bourne	Tom Golden and Morey Reden	Robert Cannavale	October 14, 1955
Audrey is sent to take a cake to Grandma. At Grandma's house, a burglar is robbing the place and hides in the bed from Audrey. Once uncovered, the burglar chases Audrey until Grandma comes to her rescue.
16	"Fishing Tackler"	I. Sparber	I. Klein	Tom Golden and Bill Hudson	John Zago	March 29, 1957
Audrey and her dog Pal try to spend a peaceful day fishing, while avoiding the mean old truant officer.
17	"Dawg Gawn"	Seymour Kneitel	Carl Meyer	Tom Johnson and Nick Tafuri	Robert Owen	December 12, 1958
Pal so much wants to go to school with Audrey, but she shoos him away. Audrey then has to rescue Pal from a sadistic dogcatcher.
