= Claster Television =

US television program distributor

Claster Television, Incorporated
- Formerly: Romper Room Inc. (1953–1969)
- Type: Subsidiary
- Industry: Television production Television syndication
- Founded: 1953; 73 years ago
- Founders: Bert Claster; Nancy Claster
- Defunct: 1999; 27 years ago
- Fate: Folded into Hasbro
- Successors: Allspark; Entertainment One; Hasbro Entertainment
- Headquarters: Baltimore, Maryland, United States
- Area served: Worldwide
- Key people: Bert Claster (1953–1984); Nancy Claster (1953–1997)
- Products: Television programs
- Parent: Hasbro (1969–1999)

Claster Television, Incorporated was a Baltimore, Maryland–based television distributor founded in 1953 by Bertram H. (Bert) Claster and Nancy Claster (née Goldman) as Romper Room Inc. It was originally a producer of the children's show Romper Room, one of the first preschool children's programs.

== Production ==
Romper Room was fairly successful in its early years. CBS offered to pick up the show, but the Clasters instead decided to syndicate and franchise it, by taping episodes and selling the tapes to local stations or giving the option to local stations to produce their own version of the show.

In 1969, Hasbro bought Romper Room Inc. and renamed it Claster Television Productions. Throughout the 1970s, Claster continued to make Romper Room and did not distribute anything else until 1978 when it brought the anime Star Blazers into the United States. It also developed the television series Bowling for Dollars.

In the 1980s, Hasbro formed contracts with animation studios to make cartoons that would promote the sale of Hasbro's toys. In 1983, Claster distributed the animated series G.I. Joe, which was fairly successful. A year later, Claster distributed The Transformers, which was a major success for Hasbro and Claster.

G.I. Joe ended in 1987, while The Transformers left off airing new run episodes in the United States but continued to air for some time in Japan under the supervision of Takara, the Japanese rightsholder to the Transformers franchise. Beginning in 1989, Claster distributed a G.I. Joe animated series sequel that was made by DIC Entertainment. This ended in 1991. Romper Room finally ended in 1994 due to a loss of interest and popularity, giving the program a run of 41 years. Romper Room had been the longest-running children's show in history to date, a record that Sesame Street passed in 2010.

In 1992, Claster Television made its only attempt at a teen/adult television programme, Catwalk, but it only lasted for two years.

In 1996, Claster syndicated ReBoot, the first all-CGI television show, for a short time after it was canceled by ABC. At the same time, they distributed a CGI revival of Transformers known as Beast Wars until 1999 (its sequel, Beast Machines, would air on Fox Kids). Claster released The Mr. Potato Head Show in 1998, which was another attempt to sell Hasbro toys.

The entire list of Claster shows ended in 1999 when Hasbro formed a central media division. This division eventually became known as Allspark, and eventually folded into Entertainment One.

== List of television series distributed by Claster ==
- Romper Room (1953–1994)
- Bowling for Dollars (1960s–2008)
- Fred Flintstone and Friends (1977–1978)
- Star Blazers (1979–1984)
- The Great Space Coaster (1981–1986)
- G.I. Joe: A Real American Hero (1983–1986)
- The Transformers (1984–1988)
- Muppet Babies (1984–1991)
- Jim Henson's Little Muppet Monsters (1985)
- Super Sunday (1985–1986)
  - Jem (1985–1988)
  - Bigfoot and the Muscle Machines (1985–1986)
  - Robotix (1985–1986)
  - Inhumanoids (1986)
- My Little Pony 'n Friends (1986–1987)
  - My Little Pony (1984–1987)
  - The Glo Friends (1986–1987)
  - Potato Head Kids (1986–1987)
  - MoonDreamers (1986–1987)
- Visionaries: Knights of the Magical Light (1987)
- The New Archies (1987)
- COPS (1988–1989)
- G.I. Joe: A Real American Hero (1989)
- Maxie's World (1989)
- James Bond Jr. (1991)
- Bucky O'Hare and the Toad Wars (1991)
- Catwalk (1992–1994)
- Conan the Adventurer (1992–1994)
- My Little Pony Tales (1992)
- The Pink Panther (1993–1996)
- Transformers: Generation 2 (1993–1995)
- The Baby Huey Show (1994–1995)
- ReBoot (1994–2001)
- Mutant League (1994–1996)
- Littlest Pet Shop (1995–1996)
- G.I. Joe: Extreme (1995–1997)
- Richie Rich (1996)
- Vor-Tech: Undercover Conversion Squad (1996–1997)
- Beast Wars: Transformers (1996–1999)
- All Dogs Go to Heaven: The Series (1996–1998)
- Mummies Alive! (1997–1998)
- The Lionhearts (1998)
