= Vor-Tech: Undercover Conversion Squad =

- Genre: Action/adventure
- Directed by: François Brisson
- Starring: Michael Donovan; Ian James Corlett; David Sobolov; Venus Terzo; Scott McNeil
- Composer: Alexander van Bubenheim
- Countries of origin: United States; Canada; France
- Original language: English
- No. of episodes: 13

Production
- Executive producers: Sheldon S. Wiseman; Léon Perahia
- Producer: Rick Morrison
- Running time: 30 minutes
- Production companies: Universal Animation Studios; Edition Dupuis France S.A. Mediatoon; Lacewood Productions

Original release
- Network: First-run syndication
- Release: October 2 – December 25, 1996

Vor-Tech: Undercover Conversion Squad is an animated television series produced by Universal Animation Studios. It aired for one season of thirteen episodes in first-run syndication as part of Claster Television's "Power Block" package along with ReBoot, Beast Wars: Transformers and G.I. Joe Extreme, until the block's discontinuation in 1997. The series was based on a toyline developed by Kenner Products, which was acquired by Hasbro in 1991.

== Overview ==
The VOR-Tech Undercover Conversion Squad is a group of secret agents led by Hudson Roarke. Their mission is to stop Hudson's older brother Damian Roarke—known as Lord Matrix—and his evil "Bio Mechs" from infecting the world with a techno-infectious plague. Similar to the M.A.S.K. franchise, the VOR-Tech agents had special masks and transforming vehicles, with special computer systems that imbue them and their vehicles with special powers.

The series was canceled after only thirteen episodes and has not been released onto home video.

== Cast ==
- Michael Donovan – Hudson Roarke
- David Sobolov – Lord Matrix (Damian Roarke)
- John Payne – Rick Rhodes
- Ian James Corlett – Brad Logan and Hardfire (Jason King)
- Scott McNeil – "Sonic Stinger" vehicle
- Venus Terzo – Miranda Ortiz
- Jim Byrnes – Vance Logan
- Andrea Libman – M.J. Sloan
- Linda Boyd
- Paulina Gillis – Frostbite (Dorian Harding)
- Saffron Henderson
- Mark Hildreth
- Richard Newman
- Pauline Newstone
- Dale Wilson – Tate Osborne
- Lenore Zann
- Ashleigh Ball
- Lyon Smith
- Tom Pickett – Jeremy MacMasters

== Broadcast ==
The series was broadcast in the United States through broadcast syndication beginning on September 16, 1996, airing as part of the weekday cartoon block Power Block where it was paired with All Dogs Go to Heaven: The Series and Richie Rich.
