= Famous Studios =

American animation studio (1942–67)

Paramount Cartoon Studios
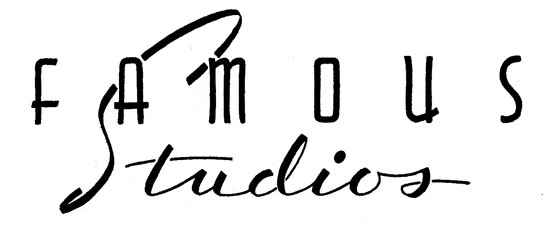
- Formerly: Famous Studios (1942–1956)
- Predecessor: Bray Productions; Out of the Inkwell Studios; Fleischer Studios
- Founded: May 25, 1942; 84 years ago
- Founders: Sam Buchwald; Seymour Kneitel; Isadore Sparber
- Defunct: December 31, 1967; 58 years ago
- Fate: Closed
- Successors: Studio: Paramount Animation; Library: NBCUniversal (through DreamWorks Classics) (October 1950–February 1962 cartoons, except Popeye shorts); Skydance (all other cartoons)
- Headquarters: Miami, Florida (1941–1943); New York City, New York (1943–1967)
- Key people: Sam Buchwald; Seymour Kneitel; Isadore Sparber; Dan Gordon; Howard Post; Ralph Bakshi; Max Fleischer; Dave Fleischer
- Products: Animated cartoons
- Owner: Paramount Pictures (Gulf+Western)
- Number of employees: Approx. 50

Famous Studios (renamed Paramount Cartoon Studios in 1956) was the first animation division of the film studio Paramount Pictures from 1942 to 1967. Famous was established as a successor company to Fleischer Studios, after Paramount seized control of the studio amid the departure of its founders, Max and Dave Fleischer, in 1942. The studio's productions included three series started by the Fleischers—Popeye the Sailor, Superman, and Screen Songs—as well as Little Lulu, Casper the Friendly Ghost, Herman and Katnip, and the Noveltoons and Modern Madcaps series.

The Famous name was previously used by Famous Players Film Company, one of several companies which in 1912 became Famous Players–Lasky Corporation, the company which founded Paramount Pictures. Paramount's music publishing branch, which held the rights to all of the original music in the Fleischer/Famous cartoons, was named Famous Music, and a movie theater chain in Canada owned by Paramount was called Famous Players.

== Library ownership ==
Thanks to a series of acquisitions, Skydance Corporation now owns the majority of the Famous Studios library, with the exception of a subset of cartoons originally sold to Harvey Comics and now owned by DreamWorks Classics. The library is currently divided as follows:

- Skydance Corporation:
  - Paramount Pictures:
    - Melange Pictures owns the pre-October 1950 cartoons, except for the Popeye and Superman shorts.
    - The March 1962–December 1967 cartoons were never sold and have been owned by Paramount continuously since their release.
  - Warner Bros. Entertainment:
    - Turner Entertainment Co. owns all the Popeye the Sailor cartoons.
  - DC Comics was the final owner of all the Superman cartoons before they fell into the public domain.
- DreamWorks Animation:
  - DreamWorks Classics owns the October 1950–February 1962 cartoons, excluding Popeye shorts.

== History ==
=== Fleischer Studios dissolution ===
Fleischer Studios was a successful animation studio responsible for producing cartoon shorts starring characters such as Betty Boop and Popeye the Sailor. The studio moved its operations from New York City to Miami, Florida in 1938, following union problems and the start of production on its first feature film, Gulliver's Travels (1939). While Gulliver was a success, the expense of the move and increased overhead costs created financial problems for the studio, which then depended on advances and loans from its distributor, Paramount Pictures, in order to continue production on its short subjects and to begin work on a second feature, Mr. Bug Goes to Town (also known as Hoppity Goes to Town).

Compounding the problem was the animosity between studio's co-founders, brothers Max Fleischer and Dave Fleischer, who were becoming increasingly estranged, and by this time were no longer speaking to each other due to personal and professional disputes. On May 25, 1941, Paramount assumed full ownership of Fleischer Studios, and required the Fleischer brothers to submit signed letters of resignation, to be used at Paramount's discretion. Following the unsuccessful release of Mr. Bug in December 1941, Max Fleischer sent Paramount a telegram expressing his inability to cooperate with Dave. Paramount interpreted this as Max relinquishing control to his brother and responded by producing his letter of resignation, effectively firing him at an urgent meeting. Paramount then found out that Dave himself departed for Los Angeles a month earlier as he announced his resignation on December 31, and he would eventually find work as a producer for Columbia Pictures' animation division Screen Gems. This meant the Fleischer brothers had left the company they had founded.

As a result, Paramount took full control of the studio in January 1942, renaming it Famous Studios. Three top Fleischer employees were promoted to run the animation studio: business manager Sam Buchwald, storyboard artist Isadore Sparber, and Max Fleischer's son-in-law, head animator Seymour Kneitel. Buchwald assumed Max Fleischer's place as executive producer, while Sparber and Kneitel shared Dave Fleischer's former responsibilities as supervising producers and credited directors. A third director, Dan Gordon, remained only briefly before being fired shortly after the move to New York. Although the Fleischers left the studio at the end of 1941, Famous Studios was not officially incorporated until May 25, 1942, after Paramount's contract with Fleischer Studios had formally run its course (Famous remained a separate entity from Paramount). The first Famous Studios cartoon was the Popeye short You're a Sap, Mr. Jap, released on August 7, 1942.

=== Early years ===
Famous Studios in its inception was abnornally large when compared to other major animation studios at the time, having operating 6 to 8 animation units compared to the typical 2 to 4. Shortly after the takeover, Paramount began plans to move and downsize Famous Studios back to New York, a move completed early in 1943. Virtually all of the Famous staff, including voice artist/storyman Jack Mercer, storyman Carl Meyer, voice artist Mae Questel, and animators such as Myron Waldman, David Tendlar, Thomas Johnson, Nicholas Tafuri, and Al Eugster, were holdovers from the Fleischer era. These artists remained with Famous/Paramount for much of the studio's existence. Unlike at Fleischer, the animation directors—Kneitel, Sparber, Gordon, and Disney/Terrytoons veteran Bill Tytla—were more involved than Dave Fleischer and served as the actual directors. Sammy Timberg served as musical director until he was succeeded in 1944 by Winston Sharples, who formerly worked with the Van Beuren Studios.

Continuing series from the Fleischer period included Popeye the Sailor and Superman, both licensed from popular comics characters. The expensive Superman cartoons, having lost their novelty value with exhibitors, ended production in 1943, a year after Famous' inception. They were replaced by a series starring the Saturday Evening Post comic-strip character Little Lulu, created by Marge Buell. Also in 1943, Famous began producing the formerly black-and-white Popeye cartoons in Technicolor, and began a new series of one-shot cartoons under the umbrella title Noveltoons (similar in respects to the Color Classics series from Fleischer Studios, and also the Looney Tunes and Merrie Melodies series from Warner Bros. Cartoons).

The Noveltoons series introduced several popular characters such as Herman and Katnip, Baby Huey, and Casper the Friendly Ghost. Casper was created by writer Seymour Reit and Famous animator Joe Oriolo in the late 1930s as a children's-book manuscript, and was sold to Famous during World War II. It became the studio's most successful wholly owned property.

In 1947, Famous discontinued the Little Lulu shorts after they and Buell mutually agreed to end there contractual arrangement. In Lulu's place, they created a new series starring a "mischievous girl" character, Little Audrey, as a replacement. That same year Famous resurrected an old Fleischer series, Screen Songs, introducing a new series of musical cartoons featuring a "bouncing ball" sing-along. In 1951, the Screen Songs became "Kartune Musical Shorts," which ended in 1953 after Max Fleischer claimed ownership of the "bouncing ball" trademark. Only two more musical cartoons were released (as one-shot Noveltoons): 1954's Candy Cabaret and 1963's Hobo's Holiday.

=== Later period and sales of cartoon libraries ===
By 1950, Paramount scaled the studio down to 5 animation units. Dave Tendlar's unit would produce Herman and Katnip, Baby Huey and the Noveltoon shorts, with his cartoons being particularly noted for there violence; Tom Johnson's unit would mainly handle the Popeye series; Al Eugster's unit would produce either Popeye, Herman and Katnip, or Screen Songs shorts; Myron Waldman's unit would produce both the Casper and Screen Song series, and the occasional Noveltoon cartoon. The last unit, managed by Steve Muffati, and occasionally George Germanetti, would produce the Little Audrey series, as well as Casper, and Popeye before being closed. Sam Buchwald would also die from a heart attack in 1951. Seymour Kneitel and Isadore Sparber became the production heads of the studio shortly afterward, and Tendlar was promoted to director in 1953.

The mid- and late-1950s brought a number of significant changes for Famous Studios. In 1955, Paramount sold most of its 1942–1950 shorts and cartoons (except for the Popeye and Superman shorts) to U.M. & M. TV Corporation for television distribution. The Popeye cartoons were acquired by Associated Artists Productions, and the Superman cartoons had already reverted to Superman's owners National Comics after the studio's film rights to the character had expired. On October 1, 1956, Famous Studios was downsized and reorganized again. Paramount assumed further control of the studio, integrating it as a division named Paramount Cartoon Studios. Around the same time, Isadore Sparber was fired alongside several employees (among them Dave Tendlar), leaving Seymour Kneitel in sole charge of the studio. In addition, because of studio budget cuts, the animation quality of the shorts began to drop sharply, eventually being reduced to limited animation by the end of the decade. Paramount also ceased using Technicolor by this time in favor of less expensive color processes. The last Famous Studios short to use Technicolor was Katnip's Big Day, the final entry of the Herman and Katnip cartoon series. Despite the studio submitting some of their shorts for Academy Award consideration, none received a nomination.

Paramount sold its 1950–59 cartoon film library and the rights to its established characters to Harvey Comics in 1959. Paramount's attempts at creating replacement characters, among them Jeepers and Creepers and The Cat, proved unsuccessful. Nonetheless, television animation production outsourced from King Features and Harvey Films brought the company additional income. Ironically, these arrangements had Paramount working on new television cartoons starring Casper, whom they had originally created, and Popeye and Little Lulu, characters they had previously licensed for theatrical cartoons. In the case of King Features' Popeye and King Features Trilogy TV cartoons, Paramount was one of several animation studios, among them Jack Kinney Productions and Rembrandt Films, to which King Features subcontracted production. The first of only two all-new Little Lulu cartoons after the character's 13-year hiatus off-screen, Alvin's Solo Flight, was released as part of the Noveltoons series in 1961, while twelve of the King Features Trilogy cartoons, starring characters such as Krazy Kat, Little Lulu, Beetle Bailey, and Snuffy Smith, were released theatrically by Paramount in 1962 under the title Comic Kings. In 1963, Paramount sold its pre-March 1962 cartoons to Harvey for one U.S. dollar, as part of a larger agreement to produce 26 new Casper cartoons for Harvey's The New Casper Cartoon Show for $78,000.

Seymour Kneitel died of a heart attack in 1964, and Paramount brought in comic-book veteran Howard Post to run the cartoon studio. Under Post's supervision, Paramount began new cartoon series and characters such as Swifty and Shorty and Honey Halfwitch (the latter having originated from the Modern Madcaps series in the 1965 short Poor Little Witch Girl), and allowed comic strip artist Jack Mendelsohn to direct two well-received cartoons based upon children's imaginations and drawing styles: The Story of George Washington and A Leak in the Dike (both 1965). Around the same time, Paramount would also distribute the Nudnik cartoons from Rembrandt Films.

Post left the studio due to internal conflicts with the Paramount staff. His replacement was Shamus Culhane, a veteran of the Fleischer Studios. Culhane completed a few films that Post started and then ignored the rule book and made films that were very different from the previous regime. In 1966, the studio subcontracted The Mighty Thor cartoons from Grantray-Lawrence Animation, producers of the animated television series The Marvel Super Heroes. In 1967, Culhane directed another short based on children's art, My Daddy, the Astronaut, which became Paramount's first film to be shown at an animation festival. However, when Paramount's board of directors rejected a proposal to produce episodes for a second Grantray-Lawrence series, Spider-Man, Culhane quit the studio, and was succeeded by former Terrytoons animator Ralph Bakshi in mid-1967.

In 1967, Paramount radically revamped its short-subject release schedule to reflect all-new attractions. Black-and-white subjects were discontinued, as were all cartoon reissues (such as the "Popeye Champions"). The studio retired the Noveltoons and Modern Madcaps series, replacing them with Go Go Toons, Merry Makers, and Fractured Fables. Ralph Bakshi quickly put several shorts into production, experimenting with new characters and ideas, but by late 1967 Paramount's new owners, Gulf+Western, had decided to shut down the animation studio, a task completed in December. The last cartoon from Paramount Cartoon Studios, Mouse Trek, the finale of the Fractured Fables series, premiered on December 31, 1967.

== Legacy ==
Famous Studios' library has been mostly compared unfavorably to its predecessor and competitors in terms of scope and storytelling, with Leonard Maltin saying that its output by the 1950's had become highly formulaic, oriented toward a young audience, and not artistically ambitious or sophisticated, unlike Terrytoons and Screen Gems who improved their cartoons' quality at some point.

Several series' from the studio's later period, such as Herman and Katnip, Baby Huey and several Noveltoon cartoons (particularly such shorts produced by the Tendlar unit), have also been noted for having slapstick that reached a level of brutality that surpassed both the Looney Tunes and MGM shorts, which was noted by historians like Steve Stanchfield and Jerry Beck. Mike Reiss, a writer and showrunner for The Simpsons, also cites Herman and Katnip, which he calls a "cheap, ultra-violent knockoff" of Tom and Jerry, as the inspiration to the show's in-universe cartoon, The Itchy & Scratchy Show.

The studio never gained the artistic acclaim of Walt Disney Productions, Warner Bros. Cartoons, MGM Cartoons, Walter Lantz Productions or UPA later in its life. Despite this, the Famous shorts have since gained a cult following on both public-domain home media and in animation circles. The 1961 short Abner the Baseball is displayed at the Baseball Hall of Fame.

== Ownership and licensing ==
Throughout the 1950s, most of the major Hollywood studios sold off their film libraries to various television companies. In the case of Paramount, throughout the decade, they sold off the Famous Studios library to various different TV syndication companies resulting in multiple studios owning different cartoons.

=== U.M. & M. TV Corporation ===
In January 1956, Paramount sold the Pre-October 1950 Fleischer and Famous Studios cartoons (excluding Popeye and Superman) to U.M. & M. TV Corporation for $3 million. In 1957, U.M & M was bought out by National Telefilm Associates (NTA). In the 1980s, NTA changed its name to Republic Pictures after the original studio of that name, whose library NTA had also acquired. After a brief period of ownership by Spelling Entertainment in 1994, Republic Pictures was purchased by Paramount's parent company Viacom (now Skydance Corporation) in 1996, placing the shorts back in Paramount's control (Republic Pictures was renamed Melange Pictures LLC. from 2006 to 2023).

Due to poor attention to then-required copyright renewals over the decades, many of these cartoons are now in the public domain.

=== Popeye and Superman ===
In June 1956, Paramount sold the entirety of the Fleischer/Famous Studios Popeye cartoons from 1933 to 1957 to Associated Artists Productions (which had also recently purchased much of the Warner Bros. back catalog) for $1.25 million. The assets of A.A.P. were in turn purchased by United Artists in 1958. In 1981, United Artists merged with Metro-Goldwyn-Mayer to form MGM/UA. In 1986, Ted Turner's Turner Broadcasting System attempted to acquire MGM/UA, but due to debt concerns, Turner was forced to sell the company back to its previous owner Kirk Kerkorian. However, Turner kept most of the pre-May 1986 MGM library as well as a few portions of the United Artists library, including the former A.A.P. library, and formed his own holding company Turner Entertainment Co. to manage the rights. In 1996, Turner Broadcasting merged with Time-Warner (now Warner Bros. Discovery). Since then, Warner Bros. controls the rights to the theatrical Popeye cartoons via Turner Entertainment Co.

As per their original contract, the rights to the Superman cartoons reverted to National Comics after Paramount's deal expired in 1947. While the cartoons themselves are now in the public domain after their original copyrights were not renewed, the ancillary rights are still owned by DC Comics, and the cartoons (in authorized editions from the original negatives) are distributed by Warner Bros., which has owned DC since 1969.

In October 2026, Paramount Skydance acquired Warner Bros. Discovery. The acquisition, upon closing, gave Paramount Skydance (which was renamed to Skydance Corporation) ownership of the Popeye and Superman cartoons, leaving the October 1950–February 1962 non-Popeye cartoons as the only portion of the Famous library not under Skydance's ownership.

=== Harvey Comics and Harvey Films ===
In July 1958, Paramount sold off the Famous Studios cartoons made between October 1950 and December 1959, as well as the rights to all original characters created by Famous Studios (Casper, Baby Huey, Herman and Katnip, Buzzy the Crow, Tommy Tortoise, Moe Hare, Little Audrey, etc.) to Harvey Comics for $1.7 million, who in turn created Harvey Films to handle the rights and rebranded the cartoons as Harveytoons. The deal also gave ABC television distribution rights to the cartoons for the next 30 years (the rights reverted to Harvey in 1989) while Paramount retained theatrical rights. In 1963, Paramount sold its cartoons made between January 1960 and February 1962, again to Harvey Comics, for $1.

In 2001, Harvey Comics was purchased by the holding company Classic Media. In 2012, Classic Media was purchased by DreamWorks Animation, which retains ownership of the cartoons. In 2016, DreamWorks Animation was purchased by Comcast's NBCUniversal, with Universal Pictures assuming the distribution of the cartoons on behalf of DreamWorks.

However, while NBCUniversal and DreamWorks Animation own the bulk of the rights to the Harveytoons catalog, as per their original 1958 contract, Paramount still retains theatrical rights to the cartoons and thus also controls the original camera negatives. However, the contract also stipulates that Harvey (and by extension, DreamWorks and NBCUniversal) are allowed to access the original film elements from Paramount whenever they feel the need to update their prints.

=== The later cartoons ===
Paramount continues to own the rights to the cartoons made from March 1962 to December 1967.

=== Home media ===
==== Paramount-owned cartoons ====
Before 2026, there were no official home video releases of the Paramount-owned Famous Studios library, with the sole exception being the 1966 Noveltoon short Space Kid. Many of the pre-1950 cartoons are in the public domain and widely available (albeit usually in poor quality) in several low-budget DVDs and Blu-Rays sold in supermarkets and department stores. In 2012, Thunderbean Animation released a collection of public domain Noveltoons on DVD entitled Noveltoons Original Classics, and later re-released the collection on Blu-ray in 2019.

On January 26, 2026, film preservationist Thad Komorowski announced the Famous Studios Champion Collection, the first officially licensed release of the Paramount-owned Famous Studios cartoons. Produced by Komorowski's Cartoon Logic label and distributed by ClassicFlix, the set was released on DVD and Blu-ray on April 21, 2026, and features 18 cartoons restored from 4K scans of the original theatrical negatives in co-operation with the Paramount Pictures Archives.

==== Popeye and Superman cartoons ====
In 2008, Warner Home Video released Popeye the Sailor: 1941–1943, Volume 3, the third volume of a series of Popeye DVDs. It contained all the black & white Famous Studios Popeye cartoons alongside the last of the Fleischer shorts. In 2018, Warner Archive released Popeye the Sailor: The 1940s, Volume 1 which continued where the previous set left off and contained the first 14 Technicolor Famous Studio cartoons from 1943 to 1945. Warner Archive continued the collection with Popeye the Sailor: The 1940s, Volume 2 and Popeye the Sailor: The 1940s, Volume 3 officially collecting all the Popeye cartoons from the 1940s. The remaining Famous Studios Popeye cartoons from the 1950s have yet to be released.

Additionally, in 2006 to coincide with the release of Superman Returns, Warner Home Video restored and released all the Fleischer and Famous Studios Superman shorts as bonus material on The Christopher Reeve Superman Collection and Superman Ultimate Collector's Edition box-sets. Later in 2009, Warner Home Video released a standalone DVD set entitled Max Fleischer's Superman: 1941–1942 which contained all the Fleischer and Famous Studios Superman shorts. In 2023, Warner Bros. Home Entertainment released a Blu-Ray version entitled Max Fleischer's Superman: 1941–1943.

==== Harvey-owned cartoons ====
During the 1990s, Harvey Entertainment produced The Harveytoons Show, which collected most of the Harvey-owned Famous cartoons, first aired in syndication with the series being consulted by animation historian Jerry Beck. In 2006, Classic Media released 52 of the show's 78 episodes on a four-disc DVD set titled Harvey Toons – The Complete Collection. In 2011, Vivendi Entertainment and Classic Media released all Herman and Katnip cartoons on a single-disc DVD set titled Herman and Katnip: The Complete Collection. Also in 2011, Shout! Factory under license from Classic Media released 61 of 78 Casper cartoons from The Harveytoons Show, on a three-disc DVD set titled Casper the Friendly Ghost: The Complete Collection. On November 2, 2021, Universal Pictures Home Entertainment (through Studio Distribution Services joint venture label) released a three-disc DVD boxset titled The Best of the Harveytoons Show.

== Filmography ==
=== Theatrical short film series ===
- Popeye the Sailor (1942–1957; inherited from Fleischer Studios)
- Superman (1942–1943; inherited from Fleischer Studios)
- Noveltoons (1943–1967)
- Little Lulu (1943–1948, 1961–1962)
- Screen Songs (1947–1951)
- Casper the Friendly Ghost (1950–1959)
- Herman and Katnip (1952–1959)
- Kartunes (1951–1953)
- Modern Madcaps (1958–1967)
- Jeepers And Creepers (1960)
- Abner the Baseball (1961; two-reeler special)
- Comic Kings (1962–1963)
- Swifty and Shorty (1964–1965)
- Honey Halfwitch (1965–1967)
- Merry Makers (1967)
- Go Go Toons (1967)
- Fractured Fables (1967)

=== Television series ===
- Matty's Funday Funnies (1959–1962 episodes only)
- Segments of Popeye the Sailor (1960–1962; outsourced from King Features)
- Segments of King Features Trilogy (1961–1965; outsourced from King Features)
  - Twelve of the Paramount-produced shorts in this series were released theatrically in 1962 under the title Comic Kings.
- The New Casper Cartoon Show (1963–1964, produced for Harvey Films)
- The Mighty Thor segments of The Marvel Super Heroes (1966; outsourced from Grantray-Lawrence Animation)

=== Industrial shorts ===
- Electronics At Work (1943)
- It's CSP for Me (1950)

== See also ==
- Bray Productions
- Fleischer Studios
- Harvey Films
- Terrytoons
- Paramount Animation
- CBS Eye Animation
- Public domain animation in the US
