= Modern Madcaps =

Animated short film series

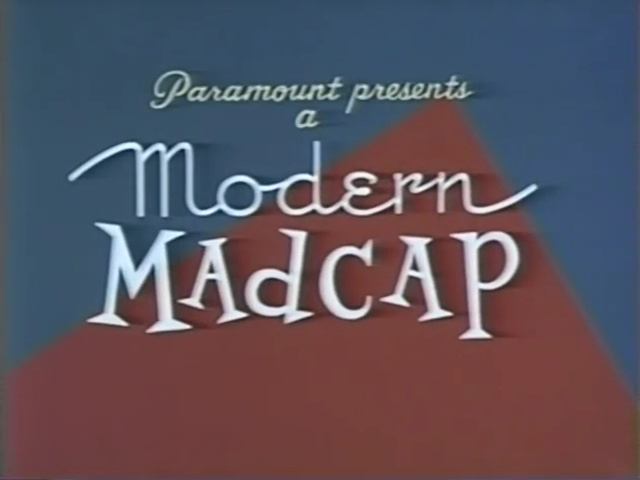
- The opening card in 1965.
- Production company: Paramount Cartoon Studios
- Distributed by: Paramount Pictures
- Running time: 6–8 minutes (one reel)
- Country: United States
- Language: English

Modern Madcaps is an animated film series produced by Paramount Pictures' Famous Studios animation division between the years 1958 and 1967. All shorts made before March 1, 1962 are part of the Harvey Comics library (now under DreamWorks Classics), while all films after remain with Paramount Pictures (via Paramount Animation). A total of 56 shorts were produced and released.

== List of shorts ==
Overview of Modern Madcaps shorts
Title	Release date	Direction	Animation	Story	Scenics	Characters	Notes
Right Off the Bat	November 17, 1958	Seymour Kneitel	Tom Johnson; Frank Endres	Carl Meyer; Jack Mercer	Robert Little		
Fit to be Toyed	February 16, 1959	Seymour Kneitel	Tom Johnson; Wm.B.Pattengill	Carl Meyer; Jack Mercer	Robert Owen		
La Petite Parade	March 16, 1959	Seymour Kneitel	Tom Johnson; Nick Tafuri	Irving Spector	Robert Little	Renoir	
Spooking of Ghosts	June 1, 1959	Seymour Kneitel	Tom Johnson; Nick Tafuri	Sam Dann; Irving Spector	Robert Owen		
Talking Horse Sense	September 14, 1959	Seymour Kneitel	Frank Endres; Wm.B.Pattengill	Sam Dann; Carl Meyer; Jack Mercer	Robert Owen	Oscar Gullible	
T.V. Fuddlehead	October 26, 1959	Seymour Kneitel	Tom Johnson; William Henning	Carl Meyer; Jack Mercer	Robert Owen		Submitted and screened at the 32nd Academy Awards for an Oscar consideration, but wasn't nominated.
Mike the Masquerader	January 1, 1960	Seymour Kneitel	Wm.B.Pattengill; Nick Tafuri	Carl Meyer; Jack Mercer	Robert Owen		
Fiddle Faddle	February 26, 1960	Seymour Kneitel	Tom Johnson; Irving Dressler	Carl Meyer; Jack Mercer	Robert Owen		
From Dime to Dime	March 25, 1960	Seymour Kneitel	Tom Johnson; Irving Dressler	Carl Meyer; Jack Mercer	Robert Owen		In the public domain due to a clerical error during copyright renewal.
Trigger Treat	April 1, 1960	Seymour Kneitel	Tom Johnson; William Henning	Irving Dressler	Robert Owen		
The Shoe Must Go On	June 1, 1960	Seymour Kneitel	Irving Spector; Morey Reden	Carl Meyer; Jack Mercer	Robert Owen		
Electronica	July 1, 1960	Seymour Kneitel	Nick Tafuri; Morey Reden	Irving Dressler	Robert Owen		
Shootin' Stars	August 1, 1960	Seymour Kneitel	Tom Johnson; Morey Reden	Carl Meyer; Jack Mercer	Robert Owen		
Disguise the Limit	September 1, 1960	Seymour Kneitel	Tom Johnson; Morey Reden	Carl Meyer; Jack Mercer	Robert Little		
Galaxia	October 1, 1960	Seymour Kneitel	Irving Spector; Wm.B.Pattengil; Morey Reden	Irving Dressler	Robert Owen		
Bouncing Benny	November 1, 1960	Seymour Kneitel	Graham Place; Otto Feuer	Robert Little	Carl Meyer; Jack Mercer		Instead of painting the film on cels, animators Place and Feuer created paper cutouts of the characters to create shadow effects.
Terry the Terror	December 1, 1960	Seymour Kneitel	Tom Johnson; Tom Golden	Carl Meyer; Jack Mercer	Robert Owen	Professor Schmaltz	
The Phantom Moustacher	January 1, 1961	Seymour Kneitel	Myron Waldman	I. Klein	Robert Little	Sir Percival Prunepit	
The Kid from Mars	February 1, 1961	Seymour Kneitel	Nick Tafuri; William Henning	Carl Meyer; Jack Mercer	Robert Little	Kosmo	
The Mighty Termite	April 1, 1961	Seymour Kneitel	Nick Tafuri; Dante Barbetta	Irving Dressler	Robert Owen	Professor Schmaltz	
In the Nicotine	June 1, 1961	Seymour Kneitel	Irving Spector; Sam Stimson	Carl Meyer; Jack Mercer	Robert Owen	Charlie Butts	
The Inquisit Visit	July 1, 1961	Seymour Kneitel	Irving Spector; Gerry Dvorak	Irving Spector	Robert Little		
The Plot Sickens	December 1, 1961	Seymour Kneitel	Irving Spector; John Gentiella; Larry Silverman	Irving Spector	Robert Owen		
Crumley Cogwheel	January 1, 1962	Seymour Kneitel	Irving Spector; Jack Ehret; Larry Silverman	Irving Spector	Robert Little		
Popcorn and Politics	February 1, 1962	Seymour Kneitel	Martin Taras; John Gentiella; Larry Silverman	Carl Meyer; Jack Mercer	Robert Little	Specs	
Giddy Gadgets	March 1, 1962	Seymour Kneitel	Nick Tafuri; Jack Ehret; Larry Silverman	Carl Meyer; Jack Mercer	Robert Little	Professor Schmaltz	
Hi-Fi Jinx	March 1, 1962	Seymour Kneitel	Martin Taras; Jack Ehret; Wm.B.Pattengil	Burton Goodman; Jack Mercer	Robert Owen	Ralph and Percy	
Funderful Suburbia	March 1, 1962	Seymour Kneitel	Nick Tafuri; Wm.B.Pattengill; Larry Silverman	Burton Goodman; Jack Mercer	Anton Loeb		Last short to have been sold to Harvey Comics
Penny Pals	October 1, 1962	Seymour Kneitel	Morey Reden; Jim Logan; Sam Stimson	Eddie Lawrence	Robert Owen	Ralph and Percy	This and all shorts after that are now controlled by Paramount Animation
The Robot Ringer	November 1, 1962	Seymour Kneitel	Morey Reden; Wm.B.Pattengill; Larry Silverman	Irving Spector	Anton Loeb		
One of the Family	December 1, 1962	Seymour Kneitel	Martin Taras; Wm.B.Pattengill; Larry Silverman	Burton Goodman; Jack Mercer	Robert Little		
The Ringading Kid	January 1, 1963	Seymour Kneitel	Morey Reden; George Germanetti; Larry Silverman	Irving Spector	Robert Owen		Submitted and screened at the 36th Academy Awards for an Oscar consideration, but wasn't nominated.
Drum Up a Tenant	February 1, 1963	Seymour Kneitel	Morey Reden; George Gemanetti; Larry Silverman	Irving Dressler	Robert Owen	Luigi	
One Weak Vacation	March 1, 1963	Seymour Kneitel	Martin Taras; John Gentilella; I. Klein	Jack Mercer	Robert Owen		
Trash Program	April 1, 1963	Seymour Kneitel	Morey Reden; Jack Ehret; Larry Silverman	Irving Dressler	Robert Little		
Harry Happy	September 1, 1963	Seymour Kneitel	Martin Taras; John Gentilella; Wm.B.Pattengill	Al Pross; I. Klein	Anton Loeb		
Tell Me a Badtime Story	October 1, 1963	Seymour Kneitel	Morey Reden; Jack Ehret; Larry Silverman	I. Klein; Jack Mercer	Anton Loeb	Goodie the Gremlin	
The Pigs' Feat	October 1, 1963	Seymour Kneitel	Martin Taras	Jack Mercer; Irv Dressler	Robert Little		
Sour Gripes	October 1, 1963	Seymour Kneitel	Morey Reden	Irving Dressler	Robert Little	Luigi	
Goodie's Good Deed	November 1, 1963	Seymour Kneitel	Wm.B.Pattengill	Jack Mercer; Irv Dressler	Robert Little	Goodie the Gremlin	Final cartoon released in Seymour Kneitel's lifetime.
Robot Rival	September 1, 1964	Seymour Kneitel	Morey Reden	Jack Mendelsohn	Anton Loeb	Zippy Zephyr	
And So Tibet	October 1, 1964	Seymour Kneitel	Martin Taras	Jack Mendelsohn	Robert Little		
Reading, Writhing, and Rithmetic	November 1, 1964	Seymour Kneitel	Morey Reden	Jack Mendelsohn	Robert Little	Buck and Wingy	
Near Sighted and Far Out	November 1, 1964	Seymour Kneitel	I. Klein	Joe Cal Cagno	Robert Little	Squeegee	Final cartoon directed by Seymour Kneitel due to his death in this year.
Cagey Business	February 1, 1965	Howard Post	I. Klein	I. Klein	Robert Owen		
Poor Little Witch Girl	April 1, 1965	Howard Post	Al Eugster	Howard Post	David Ubinas	Honey Halfwitch	
The Itch	May 1, 1965	Howard Post	Martin Taras	Tony Peters	Robert Little		Submitted and screened at the 38th Academy Awards for an Oscar consideration, but wasn't nominated.
Solitary Refinement	September 1, 1965	Howard Post	Morey Reden	Tony Peters	Robert Little	Boobie Baboon	
The Outside Dope	November 1, 1965	Howard Post	Nick Tauri	Jack Mendelsohn	Robert Little	Boobie Baboon	
I Want My Mummy	March 1, 1966	Shamus Culhane	Chuck Harriton	Bill Dana		Jose Jimenez	
A Balmy Knight	June 1, 1966	Shamus Culhane	Chuck Harriton; Al Eugster; Nick Tafuri	Heywood Kling		Sir Blur	
A Wedding Knight	August 1, 1966	Shamus Culhane	Chuck Harriton; Al Eugster; Nick Tafuri	Heywood Kling	Dante Barbetta; Howard Beckerman; Robert Little	Sir Blur	
Two by Two	December 1, 1966	Howard Post	Al Eugster	Howard Post		Wacky Quack	Held back in release due to alleged anti-religious undertones.
The Blacksheep Blacksmith	January 1, 1967	Shamus Culhane	Nick Tafuri; Al Eugster	Heywood Kling	Dante Barbetta; Howard Beckerman; Gil Miret	Sir Blur	
