= Casper the Friendly Ghost filmography =

List of cartoons based on Casper the Friendly Ghost

Paramount Pictures' Famous Studios produced three theatrical shorts featuring Casper the Friendly Ghost from the Noveltoon series: The Friendly Ghost in 1945, There's Good Boos To-Night in 1948, and A Haunting We Will Go in 1949. From 1950 to 1959, Paramount produced a series of Casper the Friendly Ghost theatrical shorts.

== Filmography ==
No.	Title	Release date	Notes
1	The Friendly Ghost	November 16, 1945	Noveltoon short based on the 1939 book of the same name.; Released in the Noveltoons series.; The first of three Noveltoon shorts featuring Casper.; Currently in the public domain.
2	There's Good Boos To-Night	April 23, 1948	Released in the Noveltoons series.; The second of three Noveltoon shorts featuring Casper.; Currently in the public domain.
3	A Haunting We Will Go	May 13, 1949	Released in the Noveltoons series.; The third and final of three Noveltoon shorts featuring Casper.; Last short with Cecil Roy as Casper.; Final Casper cartoon in the U.M. & M. TV Corporation package.; Currently in the public domain.
4	Casper's Spree Under the Sea	October 27, 1950	Casper (voiced by Alan Shay) explores the ocean and meets a pretty goldfish named Goldie (voiced by Mae Questel).: First and only short directed by Bill Tytla.; Additional voices are provided by Sid Raymond, Cecil Roy, Jack Mercer and Jackson Beck.; First appearance of theme song written by Mack David and Jerry Livingston.; First entry in the Casper the Friendly Ghost series.; First short with Alan Shay as Casper.; First Casper cartoon in the HarveyToons package.
5	Once Upon a Rhyme	December 20, 1950	Casper goes to Mother Goose Land and meets various fairy tale and nursery rhyme characters.: A clip can be seen briefly in the 1995 film.; First post-Noveltoon short directed by Isadore Sparber.; Narrated by Jackson Beck, who also voices Spider.; Sid Raymond voices Wolfie.; Cecil Roy voices Mother Goose.; Mae Questel voices Old Woman in Shoe.; Screams are provided by Jack Mercer.
6	Boo Hoo Baby	March 30, 1951	Casper finds himself caring for, and entertaining, the babies (voiced by Mae Questel) at a foundling home's nursery.: First post-Noveltoon short directed by Seymour Kneitel.; Cecil Roy voices Nurse.; Jackson Beck voices Cop.; Additional voices are provided by Sid Raymond and Jack Mercer.
7	To Boo or Not to Boo	June 8, 1951	Casper covers himself in whitewash and attends a Halloween party.: Henry and Bertha from the Noveltoons shorts makes a cameo in this cartoon.; First short directed by Isadore Sparber and Seymour Kneitel.; Narrated by Jackson Beck, who also voices Clown.; Mae Questel voices Lou.; Additional voices are provided by Cecil Roy, Sid Raymond and Jack Mercer.
8	Boo Scout	July 27, 1951	Casper decides to be a boy scout so he will be able to make friends.: First appearance of Billy (voiced by Mae Questel).; Jackson Beck voices Scout Leader.; Izzy Sparber voices Skunk.; Jack Mercer voices Billy's Brother, Ghosts.; Additional voices are provided by Gwen Davies.
9	Casper Comes to Clown	August 10, 1951	Casper saves a bear cub he names Brownie and teaches him to juggle.: Arnold Stang voices Scare-o-Meter Ghost.; Sid Raymond voices Ringmaster.; Additional voices are provided by Jack Mercer.
10	Casper Takes a Bow-wow	December 7, 1951	Casper befriends a stray puppy he names Pal.: Additional voices are provided by Jack Mercer.
11	The Deep Boo Sea	February 15, 1952	Casper plays pirates with a boy named Billy (voiced by Mae Questel) and ends up finding real treasure.: Jackson Beck voices Ghost Schoolmaster.; Additional voices are provided by Cecil Roy & Jack Mercer.
12	Ghost of the Town	April 11, 1952	Casper becomes a nationwide celebrity after saving a Baby (voiced by Mae Questel) from a building fire.: Gwen Davies voices Mother.; Jackson Beck voices Ghost Aircraft Leader, Walter Winchell, Mayor.; Sid Raymond voices TV Announcer.; Additional voices are provided by Cecil Roy.
13	Spunky Skunky	May 30, 1952	Casper meets Skunky, a young skunk covered in white paint who believes he's become a ghost as well.: Mae Questel voices Skunky.; Sid Raymond voices Wolfie.; Jackson Beck voices Moe Hare.; Jack Mercer voices Tommy Tortoise.; Additional voices are provided by Gwen Davies.
14	Cage Fright	August 8, 1952	Casper travels to a local zoo and befriends a baby elephant named Alfred (voiced by Mae Questel).: Alfred's Sneeze are provided by Sid Raymond.; Zookeepers are voiced by Sid Raymond and Jack Mercer.
15	Pig a Boo	September 12, 1952	Casper meets the Three Pigs and the Big Bad Wolf.: Mae Questel voices Junior Pig, Mama Pig.; Jack Mercer voices Bull.; Sid Raymond voices Wolfie.; Additional voices are provided by Sid Raymond and Gwen Davies.
16	True Boo	October 24, 1952	Casper pretends to be Santa Claus in order to give a little boy a happy Christmas.: A remake of the 1936 cartoon Christmas Comes But Once A Year.; Mae Questel voices Billy.; Additional voices are provided by Jack Mercer.
17	Frightday the Thirteenth	February 13, 1953	Casper tries to find a good luck charm for an unlucky black kitten named Lucky (voiced by Mae Questel).: Izzy Sparber voices Mole.; Additional voices are provided by Jack Mercer.
18	Spook No Evil	March 13, 1953	Casper is banished by his fellow ghosts to a tropical island and befriends a baby monkey he names Jocko.: Jack Mercer voices Lion.; Mae Questel voices Jocko.
19	North Pal	May 29, 1953	Casper plays with a baby seal in the North Pole.: Additional voices are provided by Jack Mercer.
20	By the Old Mill Scream	July 3, 1953	Casper helps a young beaver overcome having a tiny tail.: Mae Questel voices Short-Tail.; Jack Mercer voices MC, Old Beaver.; Additional voices are provided by Cecil Roy and Sid Raymond.
21	Little Boo Peep	August 28, 1953	Casper finds himself in a land of nursery rhyme characters and helps Little Bo Peep (voiced by Mae Questel) find her missing sheep.: Sid Raymond voices Wolfie - Ghost Sergeant.; Additional voices are provided by Cecil Roy and Jack Mercer.
22	Do or Diet	October 16, 1953	Features a farmer & Timothy Turkey from a previous cartoon short, The Voice of the Turkey.: Sid Raymond voices Timothy Turkey.; Additional voices are provided by Jack Mercer.
23	Boos and Saddles	December 25, 1953	Casper visits an Old West town and befriends a little boy named Billy the Kid (voiced by Mae Questel).: Jack Mercer voices Scared Cowboy 1, Scared Steer.; Sid Raymond voices Scared Cowboy 2, Desert Dan.; Additional voices are provided by Gwen Davies.
24	Boo Moon	January 1, 1954	Produced in 3D.; Only Stereotoon short featuring Casper the Friendly Ghost.; The 2D full screen version was later reissued as Casper the Friendly Ghost in Matty's Funday Funnies, aired from 1959 to 1962 and in The Harveytoons Show.; Second short, and only Stereotoon short, co-produced and co-directed by Izzy Sparber and Seymour Kneitel.; Currently in the public domain.
25	Zero the Hero	February 26, 1954	Casper (voiced by Cecil Roy) helps a dog named Zero (voiced by Sid Raymond) redeem himself in his owner's eyes.: Additional voices are provided by Alan Shay and Jack Mercer.
26	Casper Genie	May 28, 1954	Casper (voiced by Alan Shay) finds himself in over his head when he pretends to be a little boy's magic genie.: Third short directed by Isadore Sparber and Seymour Kneitel.; Mae Questel voices Billy.; Sid Raymond voices Burglar.; Additional voices are provided by Gwen Davies and Jack Mercer.
27	Puss 'n Boos	July 16, 1954	Casper saves two stray Kittens (voiced by Mae Questel) and decides to find them a home.: Sid Raymond voices Man on Dock.; Additional voices are provided by Gwen Davies.
28	Boos and Arrows	October 15, 1954	Casper finds a Friendly Indian Village and meets an Indian boy named Little Feather (voiced by Mae Questel).: Jack Mercer voices Mountain Lion, Native American Chief.; Additional voices are provided by Gwen Davies.
29	Boo Ribbon Winner	December 3, 1954	An overweight, aptly named greyhound, Molasses, wins a dog race with Casper's help.: Last short with Alan Shay as Casper.; Fourth short directed by Seymour Kneitel and Isadore Sparber.; Jack Mercer voices Cat & Dog Weight Reader.; Additional voices are provided by Gwen Davies & Jackson Beck.
30	Hide and Shriek	January 28, 1955	Spooky's debut, minus the derby.: Mae Questel voices Spooky, Casper's Mother.; Jack Mercer voices Woodpecker.; First short with Gwen Davies as Casper.
31	Keep Your Grin Up	March 4, 1955	At a circus, Casper (voiced by Cecil Roy) finds a depressed Hyena (voiced by Jack Mercer) and decides to help make him laugh.: Mae Questel voices Tattooed Man.; Gilbert Mack voices Ringmaster.; Additional voices are provided by Norma Macmillan and Frank Matalone.
32	Spooking with a Brogue	May 27, 1955	In Ireland, Casper decides to play along when a little Irish Boy (voiced by Mae Questel) mistakes him for a leprechaun, unaware the boy is looking for real gold to save him and his mother from eviction.: Jack Mercer voices Sailor.; Jackson Beck voices Mr. Micmiser.; Additional voices are provided by Norma Macmillan, Frank Matalone and Gwen Davies.
33	Bull Fright	July 15, 1955	In Mexico, Casper meets, and makes friends with, a little bull named Poncho (voiced by Mae Questel).: Jackson Beck voices Poncho's Papa.; Additional voices are provided by Norma Macmillan and Gwen Davies.
34	Red White and Boo	October 21, 1955	Casper travels back in time, hoping to make friends in the past.: Sid Raymond voices Caveman, Robert Fulton.; Additional voices are provided by Norma Macmillan, Jackson Beck and Jack Mercer.; Special sound and vocal effects provided the Sonovox system.
35	Boo Kind to Animals	December 23, 1955	Casper helps a small, overworked pack mule find a better job.: Sid Raymond voices Photographer.; Jackson Beck voices Ringmaster, Sergeant.; Additional voices are provided by Norma Macmillan, Gwen Davies and Jack Mercer.; A new opening theme song debuts.
36	Ground Hog Play	February 10, 1956	Casper makes friends with a little groundhog named Hillary (voiced by Mae Questel) by pretending to be her missing shadow.: Additional voices are provided by Norma Macmillan and Gwen Davies.
37	Dutch Treat	April 20, 1956	Casper travels to Holland and teaches a Dutch boy named Hans (voiced by Mae Questel) how to work and have fun at the same time.: Additional voices are provided by Norma Macmillan, Gwen Davies and Jack Mercer.
38	Penguin for Your Thoughts	June 15, 1956	Casper must bring a Baby Penguin (voiced by Mae Questel) to his parents at the South Pole when he accidentally scares away the stork tasked with delivering it.: Jack Mercer voices Mr. Penguin.; Sid Raymond voices Policeman, Plane Passenger.; Additional voices are provided by Norma Macmillan.
39	Line of Screamage	August 17, 1956	Casper teaches a little boy how to play football.: Mae Questel voices Billy.; Jack Mercer voices Hen.; Additional voices are provided by Norma Macmillan, Gwen Davies and Sid Raymond.
40	Fright from Wrong	November 2, 1956	The Ghostly Trio gets a taste of their own medicine after they force Casper (voiced by Cecil Roy) to take "Mean Pills".: Sid Raymond voices Ghost 1.; Jackson Beck voices Ghost 2.; Jack Mercer voices Ghost 3, Evil Casper.; Additional voices are provided by Norma Macmillan.; First appearance of The Ghostly Trio.
41	Spooking About Africa	January 4, 1957	Casper (voiced by Cecil Roy) helps an elephant named Wheezy (voiced by Sid Raymond) figure out what's causing him to constantly sneeze.: Jack Mercer voices Peacock, Monkeys.; Additional voices are provided by Norma Macmillan.; Currently in the public domain.
42	Hooky Spooky	March 1, 1957	Casper teaches Spooky (voiced by Jack Mercer) a lesson he'll never forget when his cousin decides to skip school.: Fifth and final short directed by Seymour Kneitel and Isadore Sparber.; Mae Questel voices Little Ghosts' Teacher.; Additional voices are provided by Norma Macmillan.
43	Peekaboo	May 24, 1957	A wicked cat takes advantage of Casper's kindness.: Mae Questel voices Kitten.; Jack Mercer voices Dog.; Additional voices are provided by Norma Macmillan and Gwen Davies.
44	Ghost of Honor	July 19, 1957	Casper attends to a premiere of one of his cartoons and is interviewed about how he became an animated cartoon star.
45	Ice Scream	August 30, 1957	Casper pretends to be a little boy's snowman come to life and teaches him how to ice skate.: Jack Mercer voices Johnny, Judge.; Mae Questel voices Billy.; Additional voices are provided by Norma Macmillan and Gwen Davies.; Final appearance of Billy.
46	Boo Bop	November 11, 1957	At the Museum of Music, Casper helps the ghost of composer Franz Schubert complete his "Unfinished Symphony".: Additional voices are provided by Norma Macmillan and Allen Swift.
47	Heir Restorer	January 24, 1958	Casper travels to Montague Castle in England and meets and helps Sir Montague, the spirit of the manor, who's unable to leave until his missing heir can be found.: Final short solely directed by Isadore Sparber.; Additional voices are provided by Frank Matalone, Norma Macmillan and Gilbert Mack.
48	Spook and Span	February 28, 1958	Casper has a hard time keeping a pig clean for the County Fair when all the pig wants to do is play in the mud.: Mae Questel voices Little Girl.; Additional voices are provided by Jack Mercer.
49	Ghost Writers	April 24, 1958	At Paramount Cartoon Studios, two gag writers (both voiced by Jackson Beck) think of good stories to write for Casper.: Mae Questel voices Three Blind Mice, Goldie.; Additional voices are provided by Jack Mercer.; Scenes from "Casper's Spree Under the Sea", "Once Upon a Rhyme" and "To Boo or Not to Boo" are shown in this episode.
50	Which is Witch	May 2, 1958	When Casper (voiced by Cecil Roy) takes Wendy (voiced by Mae Questel) to the beach, Spooky (voiced by Jack Mercer) plots to spoil their enjoyment.: Wendy the Good Little Witch makes her first and only appearance through the theatrical shorts.; Cecil Roy also voices Witch Hazel.
51	Good Scream Fun	September 12, 1958	When a crate containing a baby ostrich named Ozzie gets left behind, Casper decides to bring Ozzie to his new home.: Additional voices are provided by Jack Mercer.
52	Doing What's Fright	January 16, 1959	Cousin Spooky (voiced by Jack Mercer) is back and he sets out to play April Fool's Day pranks.: Sid Raymond voices Painter.; Last short with Gwen Davies as Casper.
53	Down to Mirth	March 20, 1959	Casper must save the world from a mad scientist bent on its destruction.: Jackson Beck voices Tour Guide, Radio Newsman, Mayor.; Jack Mercer voices Professor Brainstorm.; Additional voices are provided by Allen Swift.; First short with Norma MacMillan as Casper.; Final short solely directed by Seymour Kneitel.
54	Not Ghoulty	June 5, 1959	The Spookpreme Court decides to take Casper's powers away until he can actually scare someone. As the cartoon progresses, Casper (voiced by Norma Macmillan) constantly forgets he does not possess his powers, which angers those he tries to help. Eventually he manages to scare a group of ghosts and regain his powers.: Norma Macmillan also voices Mrs. Smith.; Mae Questel voices Baby (archive sound).; Gilbert Mack voices Mr. Galucci.; Additional voices are provided by Jack Mercer, Cecil Roy and Jackson Beck.; Only time Casper is powerless.; Footage from "Ghost of the Town" as well as the opening scene from "Casper Takes a Bow-Wow" was reused.
55	Casper's Birthday Party	July 31, 1959	Casper (voiced by Norma Macmillan) goes out to get some Friends to come to his Birthday Party.: Final Casper the Friendly Ghost series short.; Final short solely directed by Seymour Kneitel.; Mostly featuring recycled sequences from previous cartoons, with only the final scene being newly animated.; Additional voices are provided by Jack Mercer, Mae Questel and Norma Macmillan.

== Home media ==
Numerous Casper cartoons were released on home video by Universal Studios (via MCA Inc.). In 2011, Shout! Factory released a DVD set titled Casper the Friendly Ghost: The Complete Collection - 1945-1963 which contains The Friendly Ghost, There's Good Boos To-Night, A Haunting We Will Go, all 55 theatrical cartoons, and all 26 episodes of The New Casper Cartoon Show.

The 2D full screen version of Boo Moon was later reissued as the home media stand-alone reissue on VHS and Laserdisc released in the 1990s and distributed by MCA Universal Home Video. It was released on VHS along with Gandy Goose and Sourpuss in Dingbat Land, a standalone HarveyToon reissue of the short Crazy Town, and the Harvey Films reissue of The Seapreme Court featuring Little Audrey by United American Video.

== See also ==
- List of ghost films
- Casper the Friendly Ghost in film
- Homer the Happy Ghost
- Timmy the Timid Ghost
