= The Friendly Ghost =

1945 film by Isadore Sparber

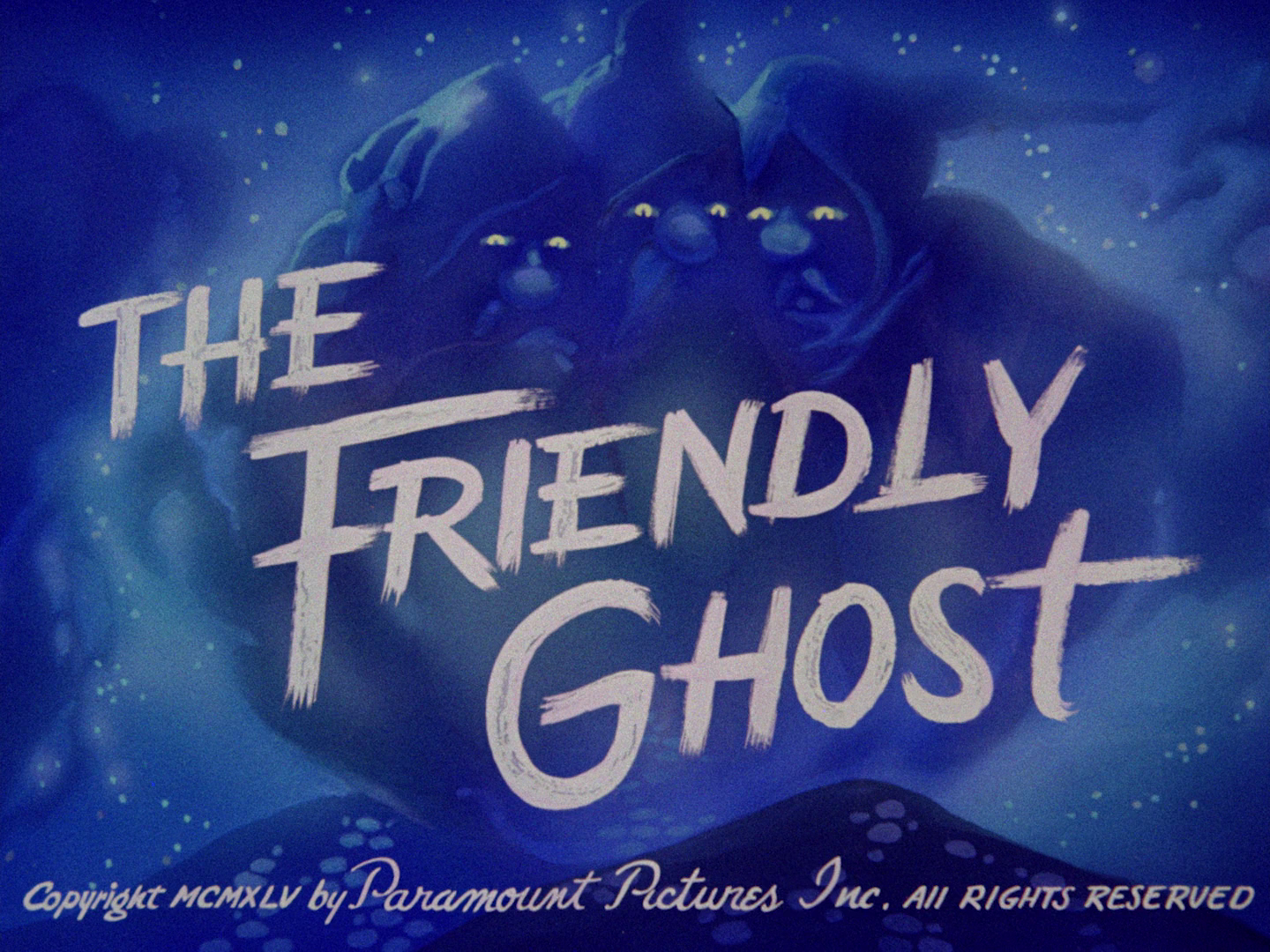
- Title card
- Directed by: Isadore Sparber
- Story by: Bill Turner; Otto Messmer
- Based on: Casper the Friendly Ghost by Joe Oriolo and Seymour Reit
- Produced by: Sam Buchwald; Seymour Kneitel; Isadore Sparber (all uncredited)
- Starring: Cecil Roy; Mae Questel; Jackson Beck; Jack Mercer
- Narrated by: Frank Gallop
- Music by: Winston Sharples
- Animation by: Nick Tafuri; John Walworth; Tom Golden
- Layouts by: Shane Miller; Lloyd Hallock Jr. John Walworth (uncredited)
- Backgrounds by: Shane Miller; Lloyd Hallock Jr.
- Color process: Technicolor
- Production company: Famous Studios
- Distributed by: Paramount Pictures
- Release date: November 16, 1945
- Running time: 8:57
- Country: United States
- Language: English

The Friendly Ghost is a 1945 American animated short film directed by Isadore Sparber. It was released on November 16, 1945. It is the eleventh film in the Noveltoons series. It is the first cartoon to feature the character Casper the Friendly Ghost, who would become one of Famous Studios' most well-known characters and become the mascot of Harvey Comics.

== Plot ==
The film

In an abandoned house, Casper is seen reading the book How to Win Friends, a real book by Dale Carnegie. Every night at midnight, his brothers and sisters scare people, except for Casper, who dislikes scaring people, so he stays home instead; he would rather make friends with the living. While his family goes off scaring people, Casper bids his pet cat goodbye and leaves home.

The next morning, he meets a rooster to whom he says hello but the rooster retreats. Casper next meets a mole. At first, the mole is happy to befriend him but when he puts on eyeglasses, he sees that Casper is a ghost and jumps back in his hole. Casper later meets a mouse and a cat (who each resemble Herman and Katnip) and who flee into the barn upon seeing him. Casper then sees a flock of chickens who fly away with their hen house and splatter eggs on him.

Near some rail tracks, Casper grows unhappy that his attempts to make friends have been fruitless because he's "just a scary old ghost". When he hears a train whistle, he decides to kill himself by having the train run over him, apparently forgetting that he is already dead. After the train passes over Casper without harming him, he begins crying. Casper is approached by a boy and a girl named Johnny and Bonnie who want to play with him, which makes Casper very happy.

After a game of ball and jump rope, Bonnie and Johnny introduce Casper to their mother, who screams upon seeing him and tells Casper to leave. Casper picks up his sack and is about to go through the door when a greedy banker with a paper in hand opens it. The banker orders Casper to tell the mother he has come for a mortgage payment, but then he realizes that Casper is a ghost. Not wanting to have a "haunted" house on the market, the terrified banker tears up the mortgage which he tells Casper to keep and runs off into fright, so fast that he sets a bridge on fire.

Despondent, Casper decides to go back home to his own family, accepting that he will never be anything but "a scary old ghost without any friends". He is about to leave into despair when the mother picks him up with a smile on her face, accepting him for saving her and the children from having their home repossessed. The short concludes with the mother seeing Casper now wearing schoolboy clothes, Bonnie and Johnny going off to school together.

== Voice cast ==
- Frank Gallop as the Narrator
- Cecil Roy as Casper, Bonnie
- Mae Questel as Johnny, Mother
- Jackson Beck as Landlord
- Jack Mercer as Ghost, Rooster

== Legacy ==
Despite being designed as a one-shot character, Casper's appearance in this short lead to a flurry of future appearances as a staple for Famous Studios and Paramount, including his own animated short film series. Casper has been regarded as an "iconic supernatural ghost character in children's literature and television". The release of this short in 1945, according to Nathalie Op de Beeck, coincided with the end of World War II and subsequently reflected the times with its imagery as she asserts that "[t]he film links supernatural horror to an acknowledgement of actual weaponry".

== Copyright status ==
The short had an initial copyright notice, but it was not renewed as was required in the United States at the time.

== See also ==
- List of films in the public domain
