= A Haunting We Will Go (1949 film) =

1949 film by Seymour Kneitel

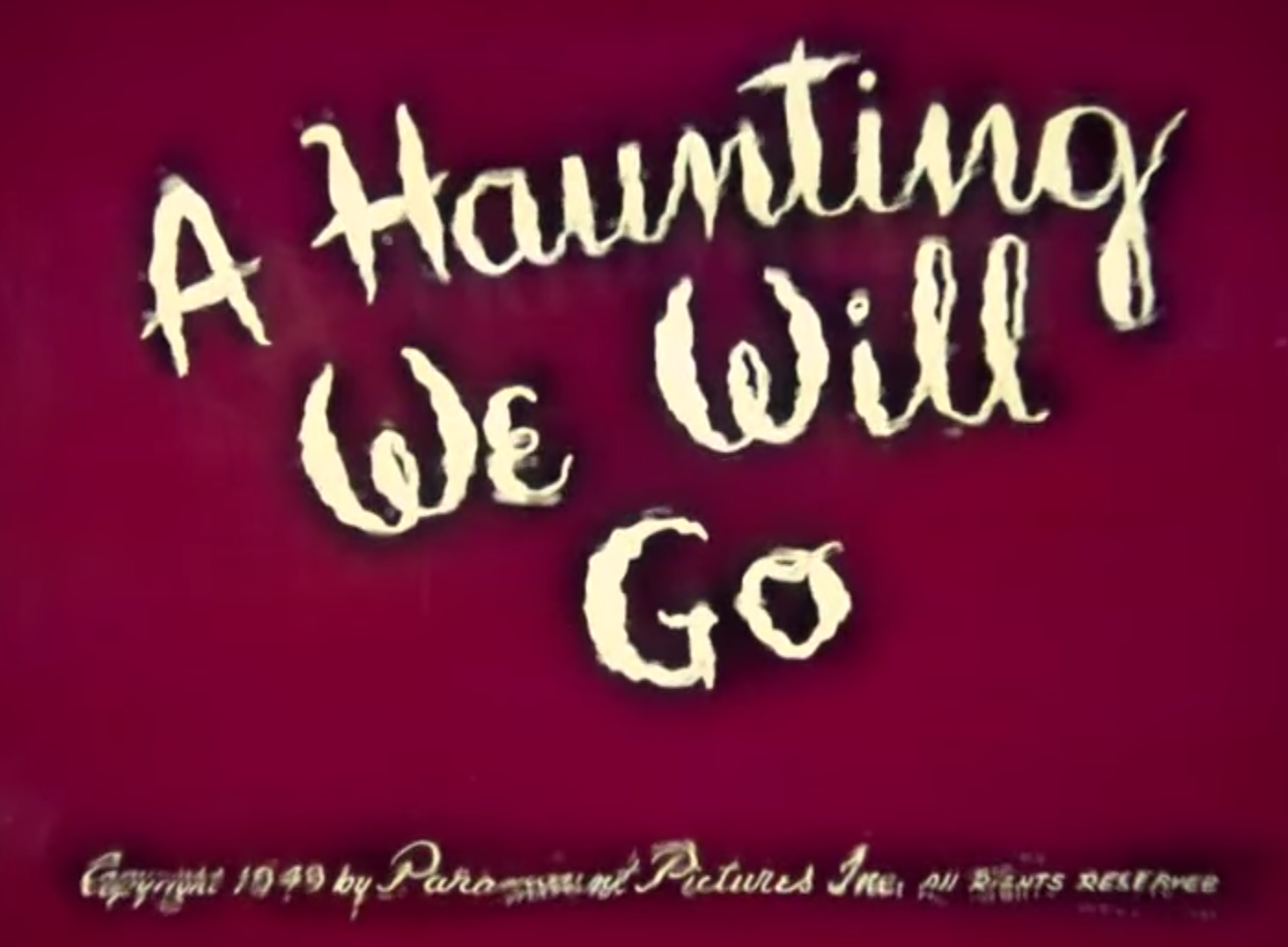
- Title card
- Directed by: Seymour Kneitel
- Story by: Larz Bourne
- Produced by: Sam Buchwald; Seymour Kneitel (uncredited); Isadore Sparber (uncredited)
- Starring: Cecil Roy; Mae Questel; Jack Mercer
- Narrated by: Frank Gallop
- Music by: Winston Sharples
- Animation by: Myron Waldman; Irving Dressler
- Layouts by: Anton Loeb
- Backgrounds by: Anton Loeb
- Color process: Technicolor
- Production company: Famous Studios
- Distributed by: Paramount Pictures
- Release date: May 13, 1949
- Running time: 8:17
- Country: United States
- Language: English

A Haunting We Will Go is a 1949 animated short film directed by Seymour Kneitel. It is the 40th film in the Noveltoons series, featuring Casper the Friendly Ghost, before he would receive his own spin-off series.

== Plot ==
Casper the Friendly Ghost, sad that he can make no friends since everyone he meets is afraid of him, hatches an abandoned egg and becomes the emerging little duck's best friend ("Dudley") and protector. Casper continues to try and teach his new best friend the ways of being a duck, and gives Dudley a rough idea on how to swim—but with no surprise, Dudley takes to it—like a duck to water. More perils persist as Casper rescues Dudley from a Duck Hunter as a decoy plot thickens.

== Additional voice cast ==
- Cecil Roy as Casper
- Jack Mercer as Turtle, Hunter
- Mae Questel as Ghost Teacher
