= There's Good Boos To-Night =

1948 film by Isadore Sparber

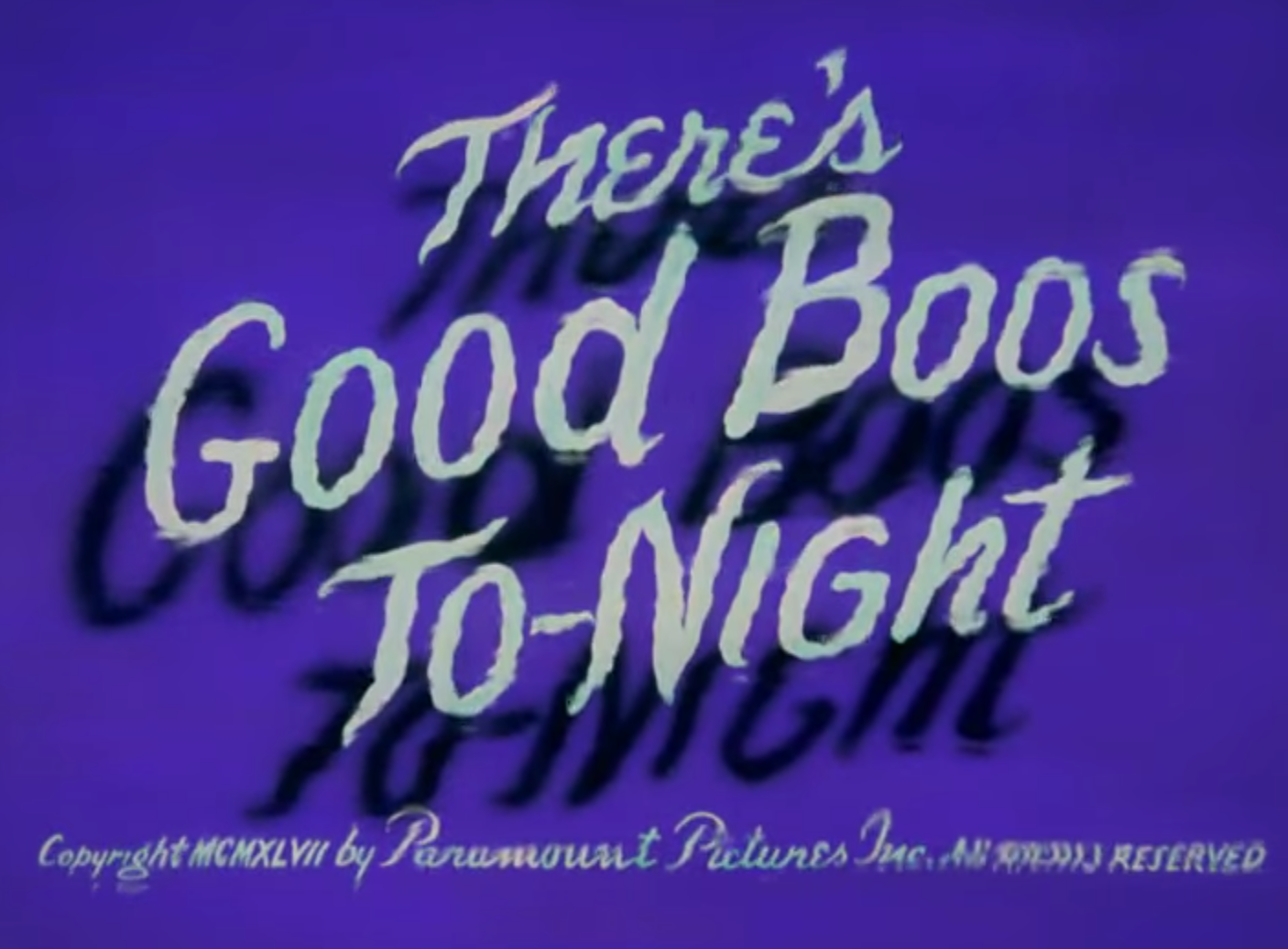
- Title card
- Directed by: Isadore Sparber
- Story by: Bill Turner; Larry Riley
- Produced by: Sam Buchwald; Isadore Sparber (uncredited); Seymour Kneitel (uncredited)
- Starring: Cecil Roy; Sid Raymond; Jack Mercer
- Narrated by: Frank Gallop
- Music by: Winston Sharples
- Animation by: Myron Waldman; Morey Reden; Nick Tafuri; Wm. B. Pattengill (uncredited)
- Layouts by: Anton Loeb
- Backgrounds by: Anton Loeb
- Color process: Technicolor
- Production company: Famous Studios
- Distributed by: Paramount Pictures
- Release date: April 23, 1948
- Running time: 8:47
- Country: United States
- Language: English

There's Good Boos To-Night is a 1948 animated short film directed by Isadore Sparber. It was released on April 23, 1948. It is the 30th film in the Noveltoons series and features Casper the Friendly Ghost. It is the second cartoon in the Casper series. The title is a play on "There's good news tonight", the sign-on catchphrase of radio commentator Gabriel Heatter.

== Plot ==
The film

The cartoon opens with Casper sitting beside his grave, decorated with the Biblical phrase 'love thy neighbor', reading a book on animal friends. Around midnight, while the ghosts at the cemetery, where Casper is buried, are getting ready to go off and "boo" people, Casper is trying to make friends with animals instead of humans. The ghosts leave the cemetery, as does Casper, who wanders off looking for friends in a couple of animals. However, when Casper tries to make friends with a baby calf, it runs away, calling for its "mama"; when the calf's mother goes up to Casper, she runs away from the farm and jumps over the moon.

Later, Casper comes across a skunk and asks it to be friends, but it sprays him and runs away in terror. Casper sits on a log and cries because none of the animals wants to be his friend. While Casper is seated on the log, he catches the attention of a small fox kit who feels sorry for him. Casper and the fox quickly bond, and he names the cub "Ferdie" and considers him his best friend. However, Casper and Ferdie's relationship soon becomes jeopardised while playing a game of Hide and Seek. While Ferdie is hiding, a hunter, his horse and two of his hunting dogs come and try to kill Ferdie. They pursue him until he is exhausted and out of breath.

While the hunter is firing gunshots toward Ferdie, Casper flies in the hunter's direction and demands they leave Ferdie alone. When the dogs and the hunter see Casper, they flee in terror. Casper looks for Ferdie to tell him that the hunters are gone but discovers that Ferdie is dead as the bullets had passed through Casper's incorporeal form and hit him. Casper cradles the fox's body and breaks down in tears, having lost the only friend he has ever had in his "life." Casper returns to the cemetery, where he buries Ferdie next to his gravestone. Casper begins mourning but soon discovers that Ferdie has returned as a ghost. Reunited, Casper and Ferdie "live" happily ever after.

== Additional voice cast ==
- Cecil Roy as Casper
- Sid Raymond as Other Ghosts, Hunter
- Jack Mercer as Other Ghosts, Calf

== Legacy ==
Animation writer Paul Dini positioned There's Good Boos To-Night at #9 on his Halloween-themed list of favorite "spooky" cartoons.
