= Noveltoons =

1943-67 American animated film series

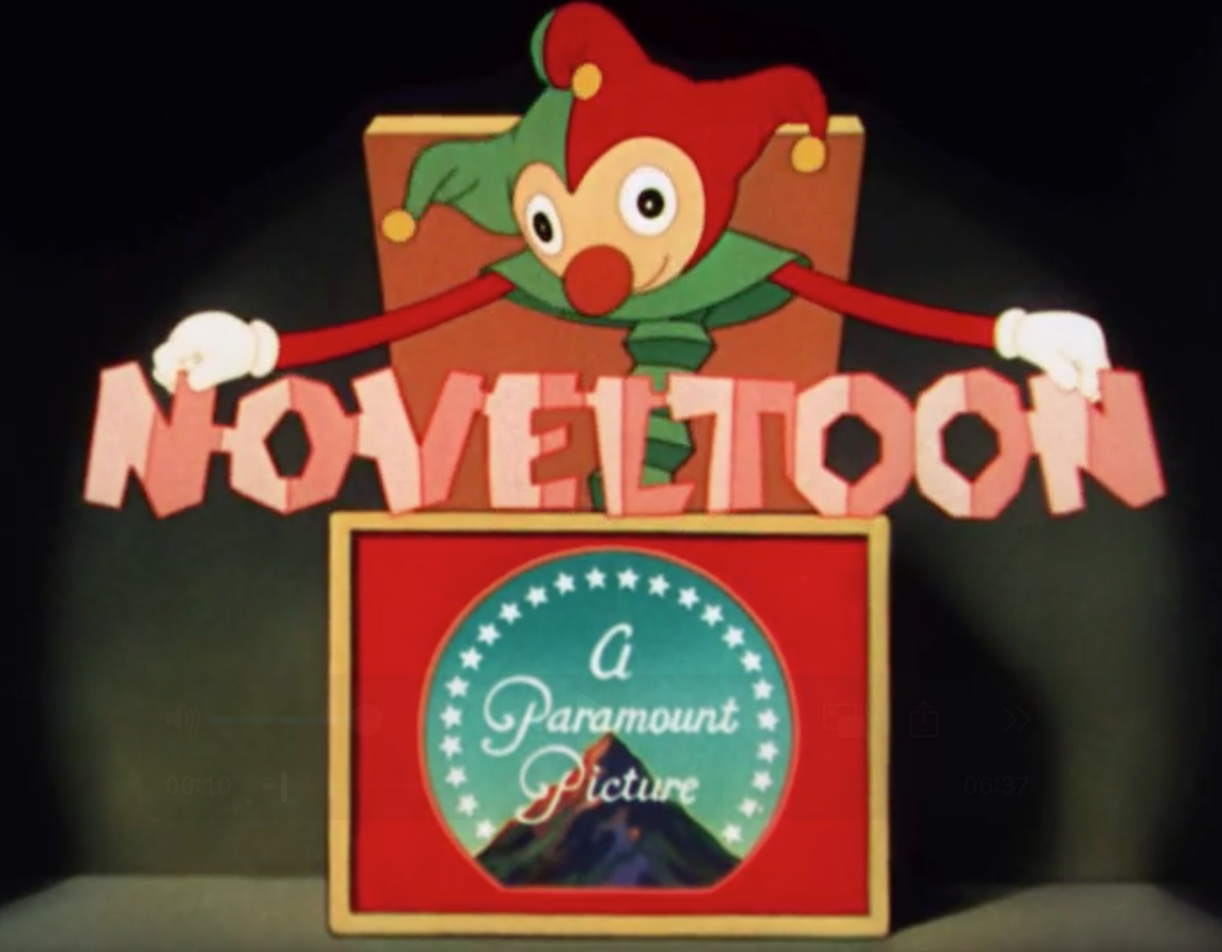
- The series' trademark opening logo
- Production company: Famous Studios
- Distributed by: Paramount Pictures
- Running time: 6–10 minutes (one reel)
- Country: United States
- Language: English (usually)

Noveltoons is a series of animated cartoon short films produced by Paramount Pictures' Famous Studios from 1943 to the end of the studio during 1967. The series originated characters such as Casper the Friendly Ghost, Herman and Katnip, Little Audrey, and Baby Huey, all of whom later became stars of Harvey Comics, which purchased the characters in 1959. The series was the successor to the series Color Classics produced by Famous’ predecessor Fleischer Studios. Several Noveltoons feature characters which originated in Color Classics, like Spunky or Raggedy Ann. This series was also similar to the two series from Warner Bros., Looney Tunes and Merrie Melodies, in that it features several recurring characters with one general title.

In 1956, Paramount sold all of the pre-October 1950 Noveltoons (ending with Saved by the Bell) to television distributor U.M. & M. TV Corporation. Shortly afterward, U.M. & M.'s assets were acquired by National Telefilm Associates. In the 1980s, NTA changed its name to Republic Pictures, and after a brief period of ownership by Spelling Entertainment in 1994, was acquired by Paramount's parent company Viacom, which placed the cartoons back in Paramount's control (Republic Pictures has been renamed to Melange Pictures since 2006, which in turn was placed in the revived Republic Pictures subsidiary).

In 1959, and again in late 1962, Paramount sold the post-October 1950 to pre-March 1962 Noveltoons (beginning with The Voice of the Turkey and ending with T.V. or No T.V.) to Harvey Films, which in turn was purchased by Classic Media in 2001. Classic Media was purchased by DreamWorks Animation in 2012 (and briefly renamed it DreamWorks Classics), which was purchased by Comcast's NBCUniversal in 2016 and currently distributed by NBCUniversal Syndication Studios.

Paramount continues to own the post-March 1962 Noveltoons (beginning with Yule Laff).

Some pre-October 1950 Noveltoons, including Cilly Goose and Gabriel Churchkitten, had their copyrights renewed. The others have fallen into the public domain, including a few post-1950 ones that were owned by Harvey Comics.

== Filmography ==
=== 1940s ===
#	Title	Original release date	Reissue release date	Direction	Animation	Story	Scenics	Featuring	Lyrics	Narration	Music	Notes	Video if in the public domain
1	No Mutton fer Nuttin'	November 26, 1943		Dan Gordon (uncredited)	Dave Tendlar; John Walworth	Carl Meyer		Blackie			Sammy Timberg	First Noveltoon cartoon, only Noveltoon recorded with Western Electric Sound in Miami, Florida, and first appearances of Blackie the Lamb and Wolfie Wolf. First cartoon directed by Dan Gordon.	
2	The Henpecked Rooster	February 18, 1944		Seymour Kneitel	Orestes Calpini; Reuben Grossman	Jack Ward; Jack Mercer		Herman and Henry			Winston Sharples	First appearances of Herman, Henry, and Bertha. First cartoon directed by Seymour Kneitel. First Noveltoon cartoon with directorial credit, and first Noveltoon recorded with RCA Sound System in New York City.	
3	Cilly Goose	March 24, 1944	March 10, 1950	Seymour Kneitel	Graham Place; Abner Kneitel	Joe Stultz					Winston Sharples	Copyright renewed in 1972 by National Telefilm Associates.	
4	Suddenly It's Spring	April 28, 1944	December 2, 1949	Seymour Kneitel	Orestes Calpini; Otto Feuer		Shane Miller	Raggedy Ann			Winston Sharples	Second cartoon based on Johnny Gruelle's Raggedy Ann character, after the Fleischer Studios cartoon Raggedy Ann and Raggedy Andy.	
5	Yankee Doodle Donkey	October 27, 1944	May 5, 1950	Isadore Sparber	Nick Tafuri; Tom Golden	Jack Mercer; Jack Ward					Sammy Timberg	Featuring Spunky, an alumnus from the Color Classics series produced by Fleischer Studios. First cartoon directed by Izzy Sparber.	
6	Gabriel Churchkitten	December 15, 1944		Seymour Kneitel	Graham Place; Lou Zukor; George Cannata; Joe Oriolo		Robert Little				Winston Sharples	Based on three books by Margot Austin. Copyright renewed in 1971.	
7	When G.I. Johnny Comes Home	February 2, 1945		Seymour Kneitel	Al Eugster; Otto Feuer	Jack Ward; Bill Turner	Robert Little				Winston Sharples	First use of the Bouncing Ball in an animated cartoon since 1938.	
8	Scrappily Married	March 30, 1945		Seymour Kneitel	Orestes Calpini; Otto Feuer	Carl Meyer; Jack Ward	Anton Loeb	Herman and Henry			Winston Sharples	First use of the "Featuring" card and fanfare.	
9	A Lamb in a Jam	May 4, 1945		Isadore Sparber	Dave Tendlar; John Gentillela	Joe Stultz; Carl Meyer		Blackie			Winston Sharples		
10	A Self-Made Mongrel	June 29, 1945		Dan Gordon (uncredited)	Dave Tendlar; John Walworth	Carl Meyer		Dog Face			Winston Sharples	First appearance of Dog Face. Second and final Noveltoon directed by Dan Gordon.	
11	The Friendly Ghost	November 16, 1945	October 1, 1954	Isadore Sparber	Nick Tafuri; John Walworth; Tom Golden	Bill Turner; Otto Messmer	Shane Miller	Casper the Friendly Ghost		Frank Gallop	Winston Sharples	First appearance of Casper the Friendly Ghost, and also his first short in the Noveltoon series, and the only short based on the 1939 book of the same name. First Noveltoon short to have a separate "Famous Studios Production" logo card.	
12	Old MacDonald Had a Farm	December 28, 1945		Seymour Kneitel	Orestes Calpini; Otto Feuer	Bill Turner; Otto Messmer	Robert Little				Winston Sharples	A sing-a-long with the Bouncing Ball.	
13	Cheese Burglar	February 22, 1946	October 2, 1953	Isadore Sparber	Jim Tyer; Ben Solomon; William Henning	Carl Meyer; Joe Stultz		Herman			Winston Sharples	Herman's first solo appearance. Clips of the episode were featured on the 2013 Brooklyn Puppet Conspiracy reboot of The Fuzz.	
14	Sheep Shape	June 28, 1946		Isadore Sparber	Dave Tendlar; John Gentilella	Joe Stultz		Blackie			Winston Sharples		
15	The Goal Rush	September 27, 1946		Isadore Sparber	Dave Tendlar; George Germanetti	Isadore Klein; Jack Ward	Robert Little			Ward Wilson	Winston Sharples	A sing-a-long with the Bouncing Ball. Final Noveltoon short to have "Paramount presents A NOVELTOON" and "A FAMOUS STUDIOS PRODUCTION" sharing the same opening card.	
16	Spree for All	October 4, 1946		Seymour Kneitel	Jim Tyer; William Henning	Bill Turner; Otto Messmer		Snuffy Smith			Winston Sharples	Featuring Snuffy Smith from the comic strip Barney Google and Snuffy Smith, licensed by King Features Syndicate. Previously considered a lost film, only one black-and-white print is available. One of two Noveltoons produced in Cinecolor. Only King Features Syndicate-licensed cartoon released under the Noveltoon series.	
17	Sudden Fried Chicken	October 18, 1946	October 1, 1954	Bill Tytla	Orestes Calpini; Otto Feuer	Carl Meyer; Jack Ward	Anton Loeb	Herman and Henry			Winston Sharples	Final Herman and Henry cartoon. First cartoon directed by Bill Tytla.	
18	The Stupidstitious Cat	April 25, 1947	October 2, 1953	Seymour Kneitel	Graham Place; John Walworth	Carl Meyer; Jack Ward	Anton Loeb	Buzzy			Winston Sharples	First appearance of Buzzy the Crow.	
19	The Enchanted Square	May 9, 1947	October 2, 1953	Seymour Kneitel	Orestes Calpini; Al Eugster	Shane Miller; Orestes Calpini	Shane Miller	Raggedy Ann			Winston Sharples	Third and final cartoon based on Johnny Gruelle's Raggedy Ann character.	
20	Madhattan Island	June 27, 1947		Seymour Kneitel		Isadore Klein	Robert Little			Kenneth Roberts	Winston Sharples	A sing-a-long with the Bouncing Ball, first Noveltoon without animation credits.	
21	Much Ado About Mutton	July 25, 1947	October 2, 1953	Isadore Sparber	Dave Tendlar; Tom Golden	Joe Stultz; Carl Meyer	Anton Loeb	Blackie			Winston Sharples	Last appearance of Blackie the Lamb and Wolfie Wolf together in the Noveltoon series. Blackie would later appear in the Screen Song The Circus Comes to Clown.	
22	The Wee Men	August 8, 1947	October 2, 1953	Bill Tytla	Al Eugster; Steve Muffatti; George Germanetti	Ewald Ludwig; Isadore Klein; Jack Ward	Robert Little	Paddy the Leprechaun	Buddy Kaye; Dick Manning		Winston Sharples		
23	The Mild West	August 22, 1947		Seymour Kneitel	Tom Johnson; George Germanetti	Bill Turner; Larry Riley	Anton Loeb				Winston Sharples	A sing-a-long with the Bouncing Ball.	
24	Naughty but Mice	October 10, 1947		Seymour Kneitel	Dave Tendlar; Al Eugster	Bill Turner; Larry Riley	Robert Owen	Herman			Winston Sharples		
25	Santa's Surprise	December 7, 1947	October 1, 1954	Seymour Kneitel	Myron Waldman; Wm.B. Pattengill	Larz Bourne	Robert Little	Little Audrey	Buddy Kaye		Winston Sharples	First appearance of Little Audrey and also her first short in the Noveltoon series.	
26	Cat O' Nine Ails	January 9, 1948		Seymour Kneitel	David Tendlar Marty Taras	Carl Meyer; Joe Stultz	Robert Connavale	Buzzy			Winston Sharples	Only pre-1950 Noveltoon not sold to National Telefilm Associates. Soundtrack lost; picture still exists. A 4K remaster sourced from the original negatives with subtitles in place of the missing audio was released on Blu-ray in April 2026.	
27	Flip Flap	February 13, 1948		Isadore Sparber	Myron Waldman; Wm.B. Pattengill	Bee Lewi; Mickey Klar Marks; Joe Stultz; Larry Riley	Robert Little			Ken Roberts (uncredited)	Winston Sharples	Only Noveltoon produced in Polacolor.	
28	We're in the Honey	March 19, 1948	October 1, 1954	Bill Tytla	George Germanetti; Steve Muffatti	Isadore Klein; Jack Mercer	Anton Loeb		Buddy Kaye		Winston Sharples		
29	The Bored Cuckoo	April 9, 1948	October 1, 1954	Bill Tytla	George Germanetti; Steve Muffatti	Bunny Gough; Bill Turner; Larry Riley	Robert Connavale				Winston Sharples		
30	There's Good Boos To-Night	April 23, 1948		Isadore Sparber	Myron Waldman; Morey Reden; Nick Tafuri	Bill Turner; Larry Riley	Anton Loeb	Casper the Friendly Ghost		Frank Gallop	Winston Sharples	Second appearance of Casper in the Noveltoon series.	
31	The Land of the Lost	May 7, 1948		Isadore Sparber	Myron Waldman; Nick Tafuri	Larz Bourne; Bill Turner	Anton Loeb				Winston Sharples	First of three animated shorts based on the then-popular children's fantasy adventure radio series of the same name by Isabel Manning Hewson.	
32	Butterscotch and Soda	June 4, 1948	October 1, 1954	Seymour Kneitel	Al Eugster; Bill Hudson; Irving Spector	Larz Bourne; Bill Turner	Robert Owen	Little Audrey	Buddy Kaye		Winston Sharples		
33	The Mite Makes Right	October 15, 1948	September 30, 1955	Bill Tytla	George Germanetti; Steve Muffatti	Isadore Klein	Anton Loeb				Winston Sharples		
34	Hector's Hectic Life	November 19, 1948		Bill Tytla	George Germanetti; Steve Muffatti	Joe Stultz; Larry Riley	Robert Connavale				Winston Sharples		
35	The Old Shell Game	December 17, 1948	September 30, 1955	Seymour Kneitel	Dave Tendlar; Tom Golden	Joe Stultz; Larry Riley	Robert Connavale				Winston Sharples	Wolfie’s first solo appearance.	
36	The Little Cut-Up	January 21, 1949	September 30, 1955	Isadore Sparber	Myron Waldman; George Whittier	Isadore Klein; M. Marks	Anton Loeb				Winston Sharples		
37	Hep Cat Symphony	February 4, 1949	September 30, 1955	Seymour Kneitel	Dave Tendlar; Marty Taras	Carl Meyer; Jack Mercer	Tom Ford				Winston Sharples		
38	The Lost Dream	March 18, 1949		Bill Tytla	George Germanetti; Harvey Patterson	Steve Muffatti; Bill Turner; Larz Bourne	Shane Miller	Little Audrey			Winston Sharples		
39	Little Red School Mouse	April 15, 1949		Isadore Sparber	Tom Johnson; John Gentilella	Carl Meyer; Jack Mercer	Robert Connavale				Winston Sharples		
40	A Haunting We Will Go	May 13, 1949		Seymour Kneitel	Myron Waldman; Irving Dressler	Larz Bourne	Anton Loeb	Casper the Friendly Ghost		Frank Gallop	Winston Sharples	Last appearance of Casper in the Noveltoon series before he was given his own series.	
41	A Mutt in a Rut	May 27, 1949		Isadore Sparber	Dave Tendlar; Tom Golden	Carl Meyer; Jack Mercer	Robert Little	Dog Face			Winston Sharples	Second and final appearance of Dog Face.	
42	Campus Capers	July 1, 1949		Bill Tytla	George Germanetti; Steve Muffatti	Carl Meyer; Jack Mercer	Robert Connavale	Herman			Winston Sharples		
43	Leprechaun's Gold	October 14, 1949	September 30, 1955	Bill Tytla	George Germanetti; Steve Muffatti	Isadore Klein	Robert Little	Paddy the Leprechaun			Winston Sharples	Sequel to The Wee Men (1947).	
44	Song of the Birds	October 14, 1949		Bill Tytla	George Germanetti; Steve Muffatti	Bill Turner; Larry Riley	Robert Little	Little Audrey			Winston Sharples	Short is a semi-remake/reused plot of the 1934 Max Fleischer Color Classic cartoon, The Song of the Birds (1934), featuring Little Audrey.	

=== 1950s ===
#	Title	Original release date	Reissue release date	Direction	Animation	Story	Scenics	Featuring	Notes	Video if in the public domain
45	Land of the Lost Jewels	January 6, 1950		Isadore Sparber	Myron Waldman; Gordon Whittier	Bill Turner; Larry Riley	Anton Loeb		Second of three animated shorts based on the then-popular children's fantasy adventure radio series, Land of the Lost.	
46	Quack-a-Doodle-Doo	March 3, 1950		Isadore Sparber	Dave Tendlar; Tom Golden	Carl Meyer; Jack Mercer; Martin Taras	Robert Connavale	Baby Huey	First appearance of Baby Huey.	
47	Teacher's Pest	March 31, 1950	September 30, 1955	Isadore Sparber	Myron Waldman; Gordon Whittier	Isadore Klein	Tom Ford	Junior	Wolfie’s final appearance in the Noveltoon series, he would be later a reoccurring character in the Casper the Friendly Ghost series.	
48	Tarts and Flowers	May 26, 1950	September 30, 1955	Bill Tytla	George Germanetti; Steve Muffatti	Bill Turner; Larry Riley	Robert Little	Little Audrey		
49	Ups an' Downs Derby	June 9, 1950		Seymour Kneitel	Dave Tendlar; Tom Golden	Carl Meyer; Jack Mercer	Tom Ford	Lightning		
50	Pleased to Eat You	July 21, 1950	September 30, 1955	Isadore Sparber	Myron Waldman; Wm.B Pattengill	Larz Bourne	Anton Loeb	The Hungry Lion		
51	Goofy Goofy Gander	August 18, 1950	September 30, 1955	Bill Tytla	George Germanetti; Steve Muffatti	Isadore Klein	Anton Loeb	Little Audrey		
52	Saved by the Bell	September 15, 1950	September 30, 1955	Seymour Kneitel	Dave Tendlar; Morey Reden	Larz Bourne	Tom Ford	Herman	Herman's final solo appearance. Last Noveltoon in the U.M. & M. library.	
53	The Voice of the Turkey	November 3, 1950		Bill Tytla	George Germanetti; Steve Muffatti	Larz Bourne	Tom Ford		First Noveltoon in the Harvey Films library. First appearances of Timothy the Turkey and the farmer. Final cartoon directed by Bill Tytla.	
54	Mice Meeting You	November 24, 1950	September 21, 1956	Seymour Kneitel	Dave Tendlar; Martin Taras	Jack Mercer; Carl Meyer		Herman	First appearance of Katnip.	
55	Sock-a-Bye Kitty	December 22, 1950	September 21, 1956	Seymour Kneitel	Dave Tendlar; Tom Golden	Carl Meyer; Jack Mercer		Buzzy and Katnip	First Buzzy and Katnip cartoon.	
56	One Quack Mind	January 12, 1951	September 21, 1956	Isadore Sparber	Steve Muffati; George Germanetti	Carl Meyer; Jack Mercer		Baby Huey		
57	Mice Paradise	March 9, 1951	September 21, 1956	Isadore Sparber	Dave Tendlar; Tom Golden	Carl Meyer; Jack Mercer	Tom Ford	Herman		
58	Hold the Lion Please	April 13, 1951	September 28, 1956	Isadore Sparber	Steve Muffatti; George Germanetti	Isadore Klein	Robert Owen	Little Audrey		
59	Land of Lost Watches	May 4, 1951	September 28, 1956	Seymour Kneitel	Steve Muffatti; George Germanetti	Isadore Klein; Larry Riley	Tom Ford		Third and final animated short based on the then-popular children's fantasy adventure radio series, Land of the Lost.	
60	As the Crow Lies	June 1, 1951	September 28, 1956	Seymour Kneitel	Dave Tendlar; Morey Reden	Carl Meyer; Jack Mercer	Robert Owen	Buzzy		
61	Slip Us Some Redskin	July 6, 1951	September 28, 1956	Seymour Kneitel	Dave Tendlar; Martin Taras	Irving Spector	Tom Ford			
62	Party Smarty	August 3, 1951		Seymour Kneitel	Dave Tendlar; Morey Reden	Carl Meyer; Jack Mercer	Robert Owen	Baby Huey		
63	Cat-Choo	October 12, 1951	September 13, 1957	Seymour Kneitel	Dave Tendlar; Martin Taras	Carl Meyer; Jack Mercer	Tom Ford	Buzzy and Katnip		
64	Audrey the Rainmaker	October 26, 1951	September 13, 1957	Isadore Sparber	Steve Muffatti; Bill Hudson	Isadore Klein	Tom Ford	Little Audrey		
65	Cat Tamale	November 9, 1951	September 13, 1957	Seymour Kneitel	Dave Tendlar; Tom Golden	Isadore Klein	Robert Little	Herman and Katnip		
66	By Leaps and Hounds	December 14, 1951	September 13, 1957	Isadore Sparber	Tom Johnson; John Gentilella	Irving Spector	Robert Connavale	Herbert		
67	Scout Fellow	December 14, 1951	September 13, 1957	Seymour Kneitel	Dave Tendlar; Martin Taras	Carl Meyer; Jack Mercer	Robert Owen	Baby Huey		
68	Cat Carson Rides Again	April 4, 1952	September 13, 1957	Seymour Kneitel	Dave Tendlar; Martin Taras	Carl Meyer; Jack Mercer	Anton Loeb	Herman and Katnip	Final appearance of Herman in the Noveltoon series, before he and Katnip were given their own series.	
69	The Awful Tooth	May 2, 1952	September 13, 1957	Seymour Kneitel	Al Eugster; George Rufle	Carl Meyer; Jack Mercer	Robert Owen	Buzzy and Katnip		
70	Law and Audrey	May 23, 1952	September 13, 1957	Isadore Sparber	Steve Muffatti; Morey Reden	Isadore Klein		Little Audrey		
71	City Kitty	July 18, 1952	September 13, 1957	Isadore Sparber	Al Eugster; George Germanetti	Isadore Klein	Anton Loeb	Katnip	Katnip's first solo appearance.	
72	Clown on the Farm	August 22, 1952	September 13, 1957	Seymour Kneitel	Dave Tendlar; Martin Taras	Carl Meyer; Jack Mercer	Robert Connavale	Baby Huey		
73	The Case of the Cockeyed Canary	December 19, 1952	September 12, 1958	Seymour Kneitel	Steve Muffati; Morey Reden	Isadore Klein		Little Audrey		
74	Feast and Furious	December 26, 1952	September 12, 1958	Isadore Sparber	Myron Waldman; Gordon Whittier	Larz Bourne	Robert Owen	Finny		
75	Starting from Hatch	March 6, 1953	September 19, 1958	Seymour Kneitel	Dave Tendlar; Thomas Moore	Carl Meyer; Jack Mercer	Anton Loeb	Baby Huey		
76	Winner by a Hare	April 17, 1953	September 19, 1958	Isadore Sparber	Myron Waldman; Tom Golden	Irving Spector	John Zago	Tommy Tortoise and Moe Hare	First appearances of Tommy Tortoise and Moe Hare.	
77	Better Bait Than Never	June 5, 1953	September 11, 1959	Seymour Kneitel	Dave Tendlar; Martin Taras	Irving Spector	Jack Henegan	Buzzy		
78	Surf Bored	July 17, 1953	September 11, 1959	Isadore Sparber	Steve Muffatti; Morey Reden	Larz Bourne	Robert Connavale	Little Audrey		
79	Huey's Ducky Daddy	November 20, 1953	September 11, 1959	Isadore Sparber	Dave Tendlar; Tom Golden	Isadore Klein	Anton Loeb	Baby Huey		
80	The Seapreme Court	January 29, 1954	September 11, 1959	Seymour Kneitel	Tom Golden; Morey Reden	Larz Bourne	Robert Owen	Little Audrey		
81	Crazytown	February 6, 1954	September 18, 1959	Isadore Sparber	Al Eugster; Wm.B. Pattengil	Isadore Klein	Robert Little			
82	Hair Today Gone Tomorrow	April 16, 1954	September 18, 1959	Isadore Sparber	Dave Tendlar; Martin Taras	Irving Spector	Joseph Dommerque	Buzzy	Katnip's second and final solo appearance. Final appearance of Katnip in the Noveltoon series.	
83	Candy Cabaret	June 11, 1954		Dave Tendlar	Martin Taras; Thomas Moore	Isadore Klein	Robert Little		A sing-a-long with the Bouncing Ball.	
84	The Oily Bird	July 30, 1954	September 1960	Isadore Sparber	Myron Waldman; Gordon Whittier	Larz Bourne	John Zago	Inchy		
85	Fido Beta Kappa	October 29, 1954	September 1960	Isadore Sparber	Al Eugster; George Germanetti	Irving Spector	Robert Little	Martin Kanine		
86	No Ifs, Ands or Butts	December 17, 1954	September 1960	Isadore Sparber	Dave Tendlar; Thomas Moore	Irving Spector	Robert Connavale	Buzzy	First Noveltoon to have titles readjusted for emerging widescreen theatres. Only appearance of Katsy in the Noveltoon series. The ending gag is cut from Harvey Films prints due to the involvement of the Paramount logo.	
87	Dizzy Dishes	February 4, 1955		Isadore Sparber	Tom Golden; Bill Hudson	Isadore Klein	Anton Loeb	Little Audrey		
88	Git Along Little Ducky	March 25, 1955		Dave Tendlar	Martin Taras; Thomas Moore	Larz Bourne	Robert Connavale	Baby Huey		
89	News Hound	June 10, 1955		Isadore Sparber	Al Eugster; George Germanetti	Jack Mercer	Robert Owen	Snapper		
90	Poop Goes the Weasel	July 8, 1955		Dave Tendlar	Martin Taras; Thomas Moore	Carl Meyer; Jack Mercer	John Zago	Waxey Weasel and Wishbone		
91	Rabbit Punch	September 30, 1955		Dave Tendlar	Bill Hudson; Thomas Moore	Larz Bourne	Robert Little	Tommy Tortoise and Moe Hare	Final Noveltoon to feature the Jack-in-the-Box opening titles and Sammy Timberg's opening fanfare. The ending gag is cut from Harvey Films prints due to the involvement of the Paramount logo.	
92	Little Audrey Riding Hood	October 14, 1955		Seymour Kneitel	Tom Golden; Thomas Moore	Larz Bourne	Robert Connavale	Little Audrey	First Noveltoon to feature the updated title design and opening fanfare.	
93	Kitty Cornered	December 30, 1955		Dave Tendlar	Martin Taras; Thomas Moore	Larz Bourne	Robert Connavale	Kitty Kuddles		
94	Sleuth But Sure	March 23, 1956		Dave Tendlar	Morey Reden; Martin Taras	Isadore Klein	Robert Little	Tommy Tortoise and Moe Hare		
95	Swab the Duck	May 11, 1956		Dave Tendlar	Morey Reden; Martin Taras	Carl Meyer	Anton Loeb	Baby Huey		
96	Pedro and Lorenzo	July 13, 1956		Dave Tendlar	Morey Reden; Martin Taras	Isadore Klein	Robert Little		The ending gag is cut from Harvey Films prints due to the involvement of the Paramount logo.	
97	Sir Irving and Jeames	October 19, 1956		Seymour Kneitel	Al Eugster; Wm. B. Pattengill	Irving Spector				
98	Lion in the Roar	December 21, 1956		Seymour Kneitel	Al Eugster; Wm. B. Pattengill	Larz Bourne				
99	Pest Pupil	January 25, 1957		Dave Tendlar	Morey Reden; George Germanetti	Carl Meyer	Robert Owen	Baby Huey		
100	Fishing Tackler	March 29, 1957		Isadore Sparber	Tom Golden; Bill Hudson	Isadore Klein		Little Audrey		
101	Mr. Money Gags	June 7, 1957		Isadore Sparber	Al Eugster; Wm.B Pattengill	Carl Meyer	Robert Owen	Tommy Tortoise and Moe Hare	Final appearances of Tommy Tortoise and Moe Hare.	
102	L'Amour the Merrier	July 5, 1957		Seymour Kneitel	Al Eugster; Dante Barbetta; Nick Tafuri; Wm.B. Pattengill	Irving Spector		Hector		
103	Possum Pearl	September 20, 1957		Seymour Kneitel	Tom Johnson; Frank Endres	Jack Mercer	John Zago		Featuring Possum Pearl, a character spun off from the Popeye the Sailor short, Hill-billing and Cooing.	
104	Jumping with Toy	October 4, 1957		Dave Tendlar	Wm.B Pattengill	Jack Mercer	Robert Owen	Baby Huey		
105	Jolly the Clown	October 25, 1957		Seymour Kneitel	Al Eugster; Wm.B. Pattengill	Carl Meyer				
106	Cock-a-Doodle Dino	December 6, 1957		Isadore Sparber	Tom Golden	Larz Bourne				
107	Dante Dreamer	January 3, 1958		Isadore Sparber	Al Eugster; Dante Barbetta	Jack Mercer	John Zago			
108	Sportickles	February 14, 1958		Seymour Kneitel		Robert Little				
109	Grateful Gus	March 7, 1958		Dave Tendlar	Nick Tafuri; Chuck Harriton	Irving Spector			Final cartoon directed by Dave Tendlar.	
110	Finnegan's Flea	April 4, 1958		Isadore Sparber	Tom Johnson; Wm.B. Pattengill	Irving Spector				
111	Okey Dokey Donkey	May 16, 1958		Isadore Sparber	Al Eugster; Dante Barbetta	Jack Mercer	John Zago	Spunky	Last appearance of Spunky from the Hunky and Spunky sub-series of Max Fleischer's Color Classics.	
112	Chew Chew Baby	August 15, 1958		Isadore Sparber	Tom Johnson; Frank Endres	Irving Spector	Robert Owens		Final cartoon to be directed by Isadore Sparber.	
113	Travelaffs	August 22, 1958		Seymour Kneitel	Al Eugster				Final cartoon released before Isadore Sparber's death.	
114	Stork Raving Mad	October 3, 1958		Seymour Kneitel	Nick Tafuri; Wm.B Pattengill	Carl Meyer	Robert Owen			
115	Dawg Gawn	December 12, 1958		Seymour Kneitel	Tom Johnson; Nick Tafuri	Carl Meyer	Robert Owen	Little Audrey	Last appearance of Little Audrey.	
116	The Animal Fair	January 30, 1959		Seymour Kneitel			Robert Little			
117	Houndabout	April 10, 1959		Seymour Kneitel	Tom Johnson; Frank Endres	Carl Meyer; Jack Mercer				
118	Huey's Father's Day	May 8, 1959		Seymour Kneitel	Tom Johnson; Wm.B. Pattengill	Carl Meyer; Jack Mercer		Baby Huey	Final appearance of Baby Huey.	
119	Out of This Whirl	November 13, 1959		Seymour Kneitel	Tom Johnson; Wm.B. Pattengill	Carl Meyer; Jack Mercer	Robert Owen		Final Noveltoon in the original Harvey Films library. All pre-March 1962 Paramount cartoons would be sold to Harvey in 1962.	

=== 1960s ===
#	Title	Original release date	Direction	Animation	Story	Scenics	Featuring	Notes
120	Be Mice to Cats	January 15, 1960	Seymour Kneitel	Nick Tafuri; Wm.B. Pattengill	Carl Meyer; Jack Mercer		Skit and Skat	First appearance of Skit and Skat.
121	Monkey Doodles	April 1960	Seymour Kneitel	Nick Tafuri; Morey Reden	Irving Dressler			
122	Peck Your Own Home	May 1960	Seymour Kneitel	Tom Johnson; Jack Ehret	Irving Dressler			
123	Silly Science	May 1960	Seymour Kneitel	Isadore Klein; Irving Dressler	Carl Meyer; Jack Mercer			
124	Counter Attack	July 1960	Seymour Kneitel	Wm.B. Pattengill; Jack Ehret	Carl Meyer; Jack Mercer		Skit and Skat	
125	Turning the Fables	August 1960	Seymour Kneitel	Irving Spector; Wm.B. Pattengill	Carl Meyer; Jack Mercer		Mortimer Tortoise and The Hare	
126	Fine Feathered Friend	September 1960	Seymour Kneitel	Tom Johnson	Carl Meyer; Jack Mercer			
127	The Planet Mouseola	October 1960	Seymour Kneitel	Myron Waldman; Jack Ehret	Isadore Klein		Skit and Skat	
128	Northern Mites	November 1960	Seymour Kneitel	Nick Tafuri; Wm.B. Pattengill	Carl Meyer; Jack Mercer			
129	Miceniks	December 1960	Seymour Kneitel	Tom Johnson; William Henning	Carl Meyer; Jack Mercer			
130	The Lion's Busy	February 1961	Seymour Kneitel	Martin Taras; Al Pross	Carl Meyer; Jack Mercer		Sir Reginald Tweedledum IV	
131	Hound About That	April 1961	Seymour Kneitel	Martin Taras; Al Pross	Carl Meyer; Jack Mercer		Harry Hound	
132	Alvin's Solo Flight	April 1961	Seymour Kneitel	Nick Tafuri; Isadore Klein	John Stanley		Little Lulu	Only Little Lulu film in the Noveltoons series; she previously headlined her own separate series.
133	Goodie the Gremlin	April 1961	Seymour Kneitel	Martin Taras; Jim Logan	Irving Dressler		Goodie the Gremlin	
134	Trick or Tree	July 1961	Seymour Kneitel	Morey Reden; John Gentilella	Irving Dressler			
135	Cape Kidnaveral	August 1961	Seymour Kneitel	Myron Waldman	Carl Meyer; Jack Mercer			
136	Turtle Scoop	October 1961	Seymour Kneitel	Nick Tafuri; George Germanetti; Sam Stimson	Carl Meyer; Jack Mercer		Mortimer Tortoise and the Hare	
137	Kozmo Goes to School	November 1961	Seymour Kneitel	Nick Tafuri; Jack Ehret; Sam Stimson	Carl Meyer; Jack Mercer		Kozmo the Space Kid	
138	Perry Popgun	January 1962	Seymour Kneitel	Morey Reden; George Germanetti; Wm. B. Pattengill	Carl Meyer; Jack Mercer			
139	Without Time or Reason	January 1962	Seymour Kneitel	Martin Taras; George Germanetti; Jim Logan	Eddie Lawrence		Ralph and Percy	
140	Good and Guilty	February 1962	Seymour Kneitel	Morey Reden; George Germanetti; Wm.B. Pattengill	Isadore Klein		Goodie the Gremlin	
141	T.V or No T.V	March 1962	Seymour Kneitel	Irving Spector; George Germanetti; Isadore Klein			Ralph and Percy	Final Noveltoon in the Harvey Films library.
142	Yule Laff	October 1962	Seymour Kneitel	Martin Taras; George Germanetti; Jim Logan	Isadore Klein	Robert Little	Goodie the Gremlin	
143	It's for the Birdies	November 1962	Seymour Kneitel	Nick Tafuri; Dante Barbetta; Larry Silverman	Irv Dressler	Robert Owen	Grumble Cogwell	
144	Fiddlin' Around	December 1962	Seymour Kneitel	Nick Tafuri; John Gentilella; Isadore Klein	Isadore Klein	Anton Loeb		
145	Good Snooze Tonight	February 1963	Seymour Kneitel	Martin Taras; John Gentilella; Jim Logan	Irv Dressler	Robert Little		
146	A Sight for Squaw Eyes	March 1963	Seymour Kneitel	Morey Reden; George Germanetti; Larry Silverman	Irv Dressler	Anton Loeb	Hip Chick	
147	Gramps to the Rescue	September 1963	Seymour Kneitel	Morey Reden	Jack Mercer; Isadore Klein	Robert Little	Skit and Skat	Final appearances of Skit and Skat.
148	Hobo's Holiday	September 1963	Seymour Kneitel	Morey Reden	Morey Reden	Robert Little		Final Bouncing Ball sing-a-long produced by Paramount Cartoon Studios, ending an on-again-off-again run that lasted nearly 40 years dating to the studio's origins as Inkwell Studios.
149	Hound for Pound	October 1963	Seymour Kneitel	Nick Tafuri; Jim Logan; Larry Silverman	Jack Mercer	Robert Owen		
150	The Sheepish Wolf	November 1963	Seymour Kneitel	Nick Tafuri	Irv Dressler	Robert Little		
151	Hiccup Hound	November 1963	Seymour Kneitel	Wm. B. Pattengill	Irv Dressler; Jack Mercer	Robert Little	Goodie the Gremlin	Final appearance of Goodie the Gremlin.
152	Ollie the Owl	December 1963	Seymour Kneitel	Nick Tafuri; Wm. B. Pattengill; Martin Taras	Irv Dressler; Jack Mercer	Robert Little	Ollie Owl	
153	Whiz Quiz Kid	February 1964	Seymour Kneitel	Martin Taras	Irv Dressler; Jack Mercer	Robert Little	Ollie Owl	Final cartoon released in Seymour Kneitel's lifetime.
154	Laddy and His Lamp	September 1964	Seymour Kneitel	Martin Taras	Tony Peters	Robert Little	Laddy; Ali Presto	
155	A Tiger's Tail	October 1964	Seymour Kneitel	Martin Taras	Tony Peters	Robert Little	Laddy; Ali Presto	
156	Homer on the Range	November 1964	Howard Post	Wm.B. Pattengill	Howard Post	Robert Little		First Noveltoon directed by Howard Post.
157	A Hair-Raising Tale	January 1965	Howard Post	Morey Reden	Jack Mendelsohn	Robert Little		
158	The Story of George Washington	February 1965	Jack Mendelsohn	Al Eugster	Jack Mendelsohn	Robert Little	Jacky	Based on the comic strip Jackys Diary.
159	A Leak in the Dike	March 1965	Jack Mendelsohn	Martin Taras	Jack Mendelsohn	Robert Little	Jacky	Based on the comic strip Jackys Diary.
160	Tally-Hokum	October 1965	Howard Post	Martin Taras	Eli Bauer	Robert Little	Hangdog; Moxie Foxie	
161	Horning In	November 1965	Howard Post	Morey Reden	Howard Post	Robert Little	King Artie	
162	Op, Pop, Wham and Bop	January 1966	Howard Post	Martin Taras	Eli Bauer	Robert Little	Ffat Kat; Rat Ffink	
163	Sick Transit	January 1966	Howard Post	Wm. B. Pattengill	Howard Post; Frank Ridgeway; Bud Sagendorf	Robert Little	Roadhog; Rapid Rabbit	
164	Space Kid	February 1966	Seymour Kneitel; Howard Post (uncredited)	Larry Silverman	Irving Dressler	Robert Owen	Kozmo the Space Kid	Planned by Seymour Knietel and finished by an uncredited Howard Post. Final cartoon directed by Seymour Kneitel. Final Noveltoon directed by Howard Post.
165	Geronimo & Son	December 1966	Shamus Culhane	Chuck Harriton; Nick Tafuri	Howard Beckerman			First Noveltoon directed by Shamus Culhane.
166	The Trip	April 1967	Shamus Culhane	Howard Beckerman	Howard Beckerman			
167	Robin Hood-winked	June 1967	Shamus Culhane	Al Eugster; Nick Tafuri	Heywood Kling		Sir Blur	Final Noveltoon ever produced and released after the studio closed down. Final Noveltoon directed by Shamus Culhane.

== Home media ==
In January 2012, Thunderbean Animation released a restored collection of public domain Noveltoons on DVD entitled Noveltoons Original Classics with the following cartoons. It was released on Blu-ray in 2019. Cilly Goose was included despite having its copyright renewed.

1. Cilly Goose
2. Suddenly It's Spring
3. Yankee Doodle Donkey
4. Scrappily Married
5. A Lamb in a Jam
6. Cheese Burglar
7. Sudden Fried Chicken
8. The Stupidstitious Cat
9. The Enchanted Square
10. Much Ado About Mutton
11. The Wee Men
12. Naughty But Mice
13. Flip Flap
14. The Bored Cuckoo
15. Leprechauns Gold
16. Quack-a-Doodle Doo
17. Teacher's Pest
18. Ups an' Downs Derby
19. Pleased to Eat You
20. Saved by the Bell.

Paramount Home Entertainment released a restored print of Space Kid on the "Paramount Presents" Blu-ray re-release of the 1982 film 48 Hrs. in July 2021, making it the first Paramount cartoon from the 1960s decade to be restored on any form of home media.

On January 26, 2026, film preservationist Thad Komorowski announced the Famous Studios Champions Collection, the first officially licensed DVD and Blu-ray release of some of the Paramount-owned Famous Studios cartoons. The set contains 18 cartoons, sourced from 4K scans of the original studio materials (in co-operation with the Paramount Pictures Archives), and was released on April 21, 2026 by Komorowski's Cartoon Logic label and distributed by ClassicFlix. The set features 14 Noveltoons (with two Little Lulu cartoons, and two Screen Songs) as well as two bonus "mostly lost" Noveltoon shorts:

1. No Mutton Fer Nuttin'
2. The Henpecked Rooster
3. Suddenly It's Spring!
4. A Lamb in a Jam
5. The Friendly Ghost
6. Sheep Shape
7. Sudden Fried Chicken
8. Much Ado About Mutton
9. There's Good Boos To-Night
10. Butterscotch And Soda
11. Hep Cat Symphony
12. A Haunting We Will Go
13. Campus Capers
14. Quack-a Doodle-Doo
15. Bonus Short: Spree for All (Black and White 35mm print)
16. Bonus Short: Cat O' Nine Ails (Restored without soundtrack)

== See also ==
- Screen Songs - now owned by Skydance and NBCUniversal
- Kartunes - now owned by NBCUniversal
- Phantasies - now owned by Sony Pictures
- Color Classics - now owned by Skydance
- Modern Madcaps - now owned by NBCUniversal via 1950-1962 shorts and Skydance via pre-1950 Paramount shorts
- Animated Antics - now owned by Skydance
- ComiColor Cartoons
- Happy Harmonies - now owned by Skydance via Turner Entertainment Co.
- Merrie Melodies - now owned by Skydance
- Rainbow Parade
- Silly Symphonies - owned by The Walt Disney Company
- Swing Symphony - now owned by NBCUniversal
- Cartune Classics - now owned by NBCUniversal
- Puppetoons - now owned by Skydance
- Color Rhapsody - now owned by Sony Pictures
- Terrytoons - now owned by Skydance
