= Land of the Lost (radio series) =

1943–1948 radio drama by Isabel Manning Hewson

Land of the Lost was a 1940s radio fantasy adventure, written and narrated by Isabel Manning Hewson, about the adventures of two children who traveled underwater with the fatherly fish Red Lantern. Each week, the show opened with the line, "In that wonderful kingdom at the bottom of the sea..." and then Red Lantern showed Billy and Isabel where different lost objects were stored beneath the waves.

The Land of the Lost radio series aired from 1943 to 1948 on the Mutual Broadcasting System and ABC. Betty Jane Tyler was the voice of the young Isabel, and Ray Ives was the voice of Billy. Several actors voiced Red Lantern, including Art Carney, Junius Matthews and William Keene. The announcer was Michael Fitzmaurice, and Cyril Armbrister directed.

With music by John Winters and lyrics by Barbara Miller, Peggy Marshall did the vocal arrangements. Organist Bob Hamilton provided background music.

A pioneer female radio commenter prior to Land of the Lost, Hewson did a food shopping show, Morning Market Basket, on the NBC Red network during World War II. She launched Land of the Lost on October 9, 1943, and it was broadcast Saturday mornings at 11:30am on the ABC Blue network until September 22, 1945. In 1944, it also was on ABC Tuesdays at 7:00pm from July 4 until October 3. On October 14, 1945, the series moved to Mutual, where it was heard until July 6, 1946 (Sundays at 3:30 until mid-January and then Saturdays at 11:30am). Sponsored by Bosco, Land of the Lost aired on ABC from October 11, 1947 until the end of the run on July 3, 1948.

== Book ==
Illustrated by Olive Bailey, the children's book, Land of the Lost, was published by Whittlesey House (an imprint of McGraw Hill) in 1945. Hewson's story was outlined in the back cover blurb:

Billy 13, and Isabel, 11, fishing from their rowboat, catch Red Lantern, the Guiding Light of the Land of the Lost. In return for letting him go, Red Lantern takes them to the wonderful kingdom under the sea where all lost things eventually arrive. Here they find the doll Henrietta that Isabel had lost overboard and the toy soldier Sergeant Pine, who is now a captain. Then there is the villainous Kid Squid and his band of cuttlefish, who nearly prevent Isabel and Billy's return to earth. Best of all are the Knives of the Square Table, with Billy's lost Jack Knife, the Great Horn Spoon, Sir Keen Carver and Lavinia Ladle. These fascinating stories have been developed from Isabel Manning Hewson's Blue Network radio program, Land of the Lost, which, as this book goes to press, is carried on more than 80 radio stations throughout the United States. Mrs. Hewson also reports that there are more than 3500 Land of the Lost Clubs and the number is growing daily.

Born in Dayton, Ohio, Olive Bailey learned drawing from her mother while she traveled throughout the west with her family as a small child. Bailey studied painting at the University of Detroit and married the British-born artist, Arno Scheiding.

== Comic books and animation ==
In addition to the Land of the Lost comic book series, drawn by Olive Bailey for EC Comics, Hewson's stories were animated as part of Famous Studios' Noveltoon series: Land of the Lost (1948), Land of the Lost Jewels (1950) and Land of Lost Watches (1951). Voices in these animated films included Mae Questel as Isabel (in a Canadian accent) and Rosita Wristwatch (in a Spanish accent), Jack Mercer as the Knives of the Round Table and various characters, Cecil Roy as Billy and Wally the Watch and Jackson Beck as Red Lantern and other characters.

== Recordings ==
During the late 1940s, Columbia released on 78 rpm, The Land of the Lost, as a three-record album.

In 1950, Columbia Records issued the LP, Bongo with The Land of the Lost (Columbia JL-8503). Side one featured Dinah Shore and a supporting cast in a tale about Bongo from Walt Disney's Fun and Fancy Free. Side two, written and produced by Hewson, was a journey to the Magic Sea Kingdom.

Of the hundreds of weekly episodes originally broadcast during its five-year run, only 7 or 8 (from between April 1944 and December 1947) are known to have survived into the present day.

== Production ==
The Bosco Company, which sponsored Land of the Lost on Saturdays from 11 a.m to noon, Eastern Time, cancelled it effective June 26, 1948, because of low ratings. Its competition included Junior Miss on CBS and Ed McConnell's show on NBC.
