= Popeye, the Ace of Space =

- Directed by: Seymour Kneitel; Animation Director: Al Eugster (uncredited)
- Story by: Carl Meyer; Jack Mercer
- Produced by: Seymour Kneitel; I. Sparber (both uncredited)
- Starring: Jack Mercer (Popeye - uncredited); Jackson Beck (Martians - uncredited); Sid Raymond (Martians - uncredited)
- Music by: Winston Sharples
- Animation by: Al Eugster; George Germanetti; William B. Pattengill
- Backgrounds by: Scenic Artists: Robert Little; Anton Loeb
- Production company: Famous Studios
- Distributed by: Paramount Pictures
- Release date: October 2, 1953
- Running time: 7 minutes
- Country: U.S.
- Language: English

Popeye, the Ace of Space is a 1953 3D theatrical cartoon released as a Stereotoon. It was produced by Famous Studios for the Stereotoon series featuring Popeye and distributed by Paramount Pictures. It was the first of two Paramount cartoons to be created in 3D format but with unsatisfying results. The other was Boo Moon with Casper the Friendly Ghost. Aiming to make a big impression on audiences, Paramount allocated additional funding for the Stereotoons which more than doubled the amount usually budgeted for Famous Studios cartoons of the day.

== Plot ==
A semi-remake of the earlier Popeye cartoon Rocket to Mars, Popeye drives along a country road in his boat-shaped car. When he sees that a bridge is out, he takes care of the problem with the help of some spinach. Meanwhile, an alien spaceship approaches Earth with its occupants bent on finding and abducting an average Earthman to conduct their tests on. They find Popeye instead, and snatch him away from his car via a propeller-mounted plunger. Later, the ship arrives at its planet of origin (determined by Popeye to be Mars). Many green-skinned aliens are in attendance as the Earthman is put on the first of their sinister machines: a Cosmic Ager that soon makes him turn 125. Not amused by the experiment, he counters by eating his wonder vegetable, and reverts to age two. After the child regurgitates some excess spinach, he goes back to age 40. Next, he is strapped to a cruel contraption that would drop the huge "Atom Apple Smasher" upon his outstretched neck. Perusing a third can of spinach makes his Adam's apple as hard as Gibraltar and the massive hammer is split in two. The abductors then successfully try disintegrating the powerful being and, when his last spinach can is all that is left of him, the aliens fight for the source of his great might. Popeye is not entirely gone, however, and his invisible hand secures the spinach. Visible and strong again, he joins the spacemen's fight until they are finally pacified. He then borrows their spaceship and safely travels back to Earth while singing his song.

== Reception ==
Gene Arneel of Variety thought it was "imaginative" and deserved "marquee billing" and that "the dimensional quality is clearly apparent even though there are no gimmicks".

== Home media ==
In 2026, Warner Archive will release this cartoon as a special feature on Phantom of the Rue Morgue. It will be restored from the Left Eye and Right Eye successive exposure camera negatives
