= Kraft Mystery Theatre =

American television anthology series

- Genre: Anthology
- Directed by: Robert Altman; Richard Kinon; William F. Claxton
- Presented by: Frank Gallop (season 1 only)
- Theme music composer: John Williams
- Country of origin: United States
- Original language: English
- No. of seasons: 3
- No. of episodes: 45

Production
- Camera setup: Single-camera
- Running time: 48 mins.
- Production company: Desilu Studios (season 2)

Original release
- Network: NBC
- Release: June 14, 1961 – September 25, 1963

Kraft Mystery Theatre was an anthology series of mystery and suspense dramas that aired on NBC (in the US) and CBC Television (in Canada) from 1961 to 1963. It was also previously a name used by the series Kraft Television Theatre for several weeks during part of 1958.

With the exception of one episode (season three's "Shadow of a Man"), Kraft Mystery Theatre was filmed and shown in black and white.

== Series history ==
The 1958 edition of the show came about starting in April of that year, when Kraft sold the rights to their program Kraft Television Theatre to David Susskind's Talent Associates. This series broadcast live, weekly dramas; Susskind revamped the series as Kraft Mystery Theatre, which still transmitted live weekly dramas, but now with a focus on mystery and suspense stories. Under the new title, the show continued until September 1958. However, that iteration of the Kraft Mystery Theatre is generally regarded as being a part of the Kraft Television Theatre series, rather than as a separate entity.

The Kraft Mystery Theatre title then disappeared for a time, before being revived as a filmed, 16-week, summer replacement series that began airing on NBC in 1961, hosted by Frank Gallop, who was also Perry Como's announcer on the Kraft Music Hall show. Kraft Mystery Theatre was shown on Wednesday evenings at 9:00 pm (EST), in place of The Perry Como Show. The series was also simultaneously broadcast in Canada, on the CBC Television Network.

=== Season 1 (1961) ===
In the summer of 1961, the series consisted almost exclusively of British B-movies from the late 1950s, edited to fit the show's one-hour time slot. Frank Gallop was the show's host.

=== Season 2 (1962) ===
When Kraft Mystery Theatre returned for the summer of 1962, the host was dropped, and the British movies were gone. The second season totaled 16 episodes, although eight were repeats that originally aired on Desilu Playhouse between 1958 and 1960. The remainder were original productions filmed at Desilu Studios. Robert Altman directed two of the newly produced episodes, including the season-premier drama "In Close Pursuit", starring Jan Sterling, Beverly Garland, and William Windom, and "Death of a Dream" starring Robert Vaughn. Later episodes featured such notable actors as Eddie Albert, and Denver Pyle.

=== Season 3 (1963) ===
The third season, from the summer of 1963, once again completely changed production personnel, and featured episodes made at Revue Studios. The season featured a mix of original stories (including at least three episodes shot as pilots that did not actually sell), as well as numerous repeats of episodes of Alcoa Premiere which had initially aired between 1961 and 1963. One episode, "Of Struggle and Flight", had first been shown on Alcoa Premiere only four months before being aired as an episode of Kraft Mystery Theatre.

=== Aftermath ===
Two weeks after the final Kraft Mystery Theatre episode aired (on September 25, 1963), NBC started airing the similar series Kraft Suspense Theatre. (The major differences between the two series, aside from a new title and theme, was that the Suspense Theatre episodes were all in color, and had not previously been shown anywhere else.) The Kraft Mystery Theatre episode "Shadow of a Man" (shown as the season-three premiere) served as a semiofficial pilot for the revamped series, and as it was the only Kraft Mystery Theatre episode filmed in color, was later included in the all-color Kraft Suspense Theatre syndication package.
