= Boo Moon =

1954 film by Isadore Sparber and Seymour Kneitel

- The full short
- Directed by: Isadore Sparber; Seymour Kneitel
- Story by: Isadore Klein
- Produced by: Seymour Shultz; Seymour Kneitel (uncredited); Isadore Sparber (uncredited)
- Starring: Alan Shay; Allen Swift; Jack Mercer; Jackson Beck; Sid Raymond
- Music by: Winston Sharples
- Animation by: Myron Waldman; Larry Silverman; Nick Tafuri; Gordon Whittier
- Layouts by: Robert Little
- Backgrounds by: Robert Little
- Production company: Famous Studios
- Distributed by: Paramount Pictures
- Release date: January 1, 1954
- Running time: 8 minutes
- Country: United States
- Language: English

Boo Moon is a 1954 American animated short film directed by Isadore Sparber and Seymour Kneitel. It is part of the Casper the Friendly Ghost series and is the second Famous Studios-produced and Paramount Pictures-released cartoon to be produced in 3D, after Popeye, the Ace of Space (1953). It was reissued in 2D on March 5, 1954.

== Plot ==
Casper emerges from a subway station, following a crowd of scared strangers. He encounters a man saying "see the wonders of the Moon for ten cents", and offering a sight through a telescope. Casper scares the man away, then uses the telescope to see the Moon. He then flies to the Moon for a visit. Casper lands on the Moon, disappointed to find no man on the Moon. He lies down to nap, then tiny Moon men emerge from holes. They capture Casper, lock him in a cage, and tow him to King Luna. The King addresses Casper as a monster and treats him as an enemy. Casper playfully picks him up, only to be placed in the royal dungeon. Then, a gang of tree men approach to attack. The Moon Men defend their fortified city with flaming missiles. The tree men fight back with water, then break through the town walls. Casper escapes his cage, and helps the Moon Men by going underground and tying the trees' root feet together so they can't attack. After the Moon Men win the battle, King Luna knights Casper for the valiant defense of his people.

== Voice cast ==
- Alan Shay as Casper
- Jackson Beck as King Luna, Moon People
- Sid Raymond as Barker
- Allen Swift as Lookout Character(s)
- Jack Mercer as Moon People

== See also ==
- Lumber Jack-Rabbit
