= Frank Gallop =

American broadcaster (1900–1988)

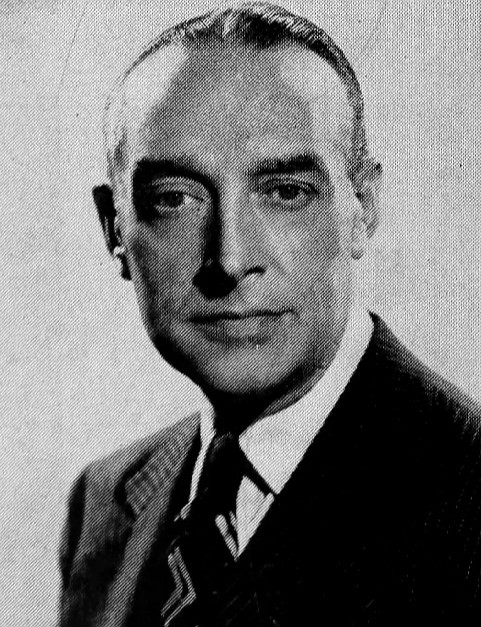
Gallop in 1951

Frank Gallop (June 30, 1900 – May 17, 1988) was an American radio and television personality who was born in Boston, Massachusetts, and died in Palm Beach, Florida.

== Radio ==
=== Early days ===
Frank Gallop went into broadcasting by chance. Born and raised in Boston's Back Bay and a graduate of Dorchester High School, he was working for an investment firm in 1934 when a client convinced him to become the replacement for his current announcer. Gallop's new-found job lasted only a short time, as the client decided to re-hire the announcer he had grown tired of. Gallop then made a decision to quit the investment banking business based on the economic conditions of the time; there appeared to be more investment consultants than clients in need of their services. His brief previous announcing experience was enough to earn him a spot at WEEI. Gallop worked for the station for ten months before moving to New York with his friend Ed Herlihy to do network announcing.

Having failed the NBC network announcer audition on his first try, Gallop was extremely eager to be hired by the other major network at the time, CBS, as he did not want to return to Boston. When he got the job, Gallop was told his starting salary would be $45 per week. He then expressed concern that it was not a "round" figure. When asked to explain, Gallop swallowed hard and said he believed $50 was a "round" sum, getting his first raise before actually starting with the network.

=== Soap operas ===
Gallop soon established a career as a radio announcer on CBS and later with NBC; he was described as "the only announcer who sounds like he's wearing spats." Because of his precise diction, it was often believed he was British. He was heard on soap operas such as Her Honor, Nancy James, Amanda of Honeymoon Hill, Hilltop House, When a Girl Marries and Stella Dallas, as well as the Columbia Workshop and New York Philharmonic broadcasts. The soap operas Gallop served as the announcer for were all part of the vast radio realm of Frank and Anne Hummert, who were responsible for writing and producing at least 125 radio shows. Gallop also did some announcing for the radio show Gang Busters, was the announcer for Orson Welles's The Mercury Theatre on the Air, as well as The Prudential Family Hour. In addition to being the announcer for the radio show, The Doctor Fights, Gallop also had a dramatic role for the program's first year in 1944.

In 1945, Gallop received an unexpected call from a radio listener of Stella Dallas. The caller indicated he or she was a regular listener of the program with a question which had often come to mind: "I listen to Stella Dallas every day, purely for sport's sake, of course, and there's one thing I'd like to know. (Caller then paused) How the heck do you stand it?" There is no record of Gallop's response to his caller.

=== Milton Berle ===
As the announcer on radio's The Milton Berle Show, he was a comic foil for Berle. Addressing the star of the show as "Berle", Gallop, who was known on the show as "Mr. Gallop, sir", would deliver a series of pointed one-liners. The "voice from the clouds" concept originated with writer Goodman Ace on the Berle radio show, but was never fully developed until Gallop became Perry Como's television announcer and Ace began writing for Como. Despite a friendship between Gallop and Berle, the working conditions on the radio show were such that Gallop quit after every broadcast. Gallop was also a "Communicator" for the NBC Radio show Monitor on Sunday afternoons from 1955–1960.

== Television ==
=== Perry Como ===
Frank Gallop making an unannounced appearance dressed as a Beatle on Perry Como's Kraft Music Hall show of February 13, 1964

Gallop was the announcer for Perry Como's 1950s–1960s television shows. At The Perry Como Show's premiere on September 17, 1955, the first voice heard was that of Gallop, saying, "We assume everyone can read, so we will not shout at you." While serving as the announcer for Milton Berle's radio show, Gallop had been the one delivering the comedy lines; on the Perry Como Show, it was just the opposite, with Como getting the "last word" on Gallop. At the start of the Perry Como Show, there literally was not enough room for Gallop to appear onstage, so viewers heard only his voice, coming from "somewhere".

The "mystery man" proved intriguing, as the show received many cards and letters asking about Gallop. When he did begin his onscreen appearances in the 1958–1959 season, how he would appear was often a surprise for everyone, Como included. Gallop might be wearing a Lord Fauntleroy costume or even a Beatle wig, showing up at the right time wearing the gear. He was an active participant in the show's comedy sketches. Gallop was also the announcer for the 1958–1959 Emmy Awards, where his "boss" (Como) received an Emmy for Best Performance by an actor in a musical or variety series. Gallop displayed his vocal abilities on the Perry Como's Kraft Music Hall broadcast of December 27, 1961, singing Jimmy Dean's "Big Bad John", backed by The Ray Charles Singers.

=== Lights Out ===
Gallop as Lights Out narrator, 1951.

Before the Como show, he was the narrator of Lights Out from 1950–1952; the horror fantasy TV series was based on the radio show of the same name. Gallop's camera appearances for the show were as a head without a body with a lit candle. As his candle became smaller from week to week, Gallop's pleas to the prop department for a replacement fell on deaf ears. Apparently sensing his dilemma, a viewer sent Gallop an entire box of candles.

Some young children were frightened by the sight of Gallop's bodiless head on their television screen and were able to recognize him away from the set. Gallop was aware of it and made use of his apartment building's elevator at times when children were not normally coming or going. Gallop's countenance was made more frightening by problems with the program's lighting. Changes to it made him appear to be smoking a cigar or with a hole in his head.

While Gallop wanted the job and auditioned for it, there were problems which could not have been anticipated. After a summer vacation on Cape Cod, he arrived home with a tan. Until that faded, Gallop had to wear chalk white powder as make-up for his television appearances. The bright television lights blinded him while on the air, so he was not able to see any visible cues coming from the show's crew. Gallop was also not able to signal the staff if necessary because this would have ruined the shot. While on the air one evening, Gallop smelled something burning and realized his arm was being burned by a light. He opted not to spoil the shot and moved his arm away very slowly. After the program, Gallop removed the black turtleneck sweater worn for the illusion of the narrator's being only a head; his arm and the sweater were both burned.

=== Other television programs ===
Gallop was also seen on other early television programs; in 1951 he was part of the daytime Broadway Open House which aired three times a week, a panelist on the game show, What Happened, and was the ringmaster for NBC television's The Buick Circus Hour in 1953.

He was also the host of Kraft Mystery Theatre, a 1961–1963 summer replacement show for Como's program. Gallop did some announcing for The Colgate Comedy Hour, working with Dean Martin and Jerry Lewis on the show in the early 1950s; he became the voice of the Dean Martin Summer Show, in the mid-1960s, this time working with Dan Rowan and Dick Martin, who went on to host their own show, Laugh-In.

In 1957, Gallop was asked about the difference in switching from radio to television announcing. He said that while the salaries in television announcing were even more lucrative than in radio, the amount of time and work involved for television shows was much greater than for radio ones. Gallop stressed that veteran radio announcers were still actively employed because of their announcing experience and that a handsome face on the television screen needed to have that experience coupled with it.

== Singer ==
As a young man, Gallop took voice lessons. While he was part of a group of singers, all was well, but when it came to solos, Gallop related, "That ended my singing career." He had a popular record in 1958, called "Got A Match" (#32CAN), but it was eight years before he made another record. He went back to the recording studio in 1966, when he released a single on Kapp Records, "The Ballad of Irving" (written by Dick Williams, Frank Peppiatt, John Aylesworth), a parody of Lorne Greene's song "Ringo". The tune hit #2 on the U.S. Adult Contemporary chart, #34 on the Billboard Hot 100, and #35 in Canada. The song was also distributed in the UK by Decca Records. It was a popular song on the Dr. Demento radio show and has been included in at least one compilation album from the Demento show. "Irving" became part of an album, Would You Believe Frank Gallop Sings? This was followed by "The Son of Irving" in 1966. Gallop's hit Kapp album was called, When You're in Love the Whole World is Jewish; he toured several US cities as the result of his music's popularity.

== Narrator ==
Gallop narrated the first Casper the Friendly Ghost cartoon in 1945. He also narrated two later "Casper" cartoons, There's Good Boos To-Night in 1948, and A-Haunting We Will Go in 1949. He was the narrator for an ABC animated children's program, Cartoonies, for six months in 1963. Gallop was also the narrator for a 1961 documentary, The Legend of Rudolph Valentino and a 1962 Buster Keaton documentary, The Great Chase.

== Personal life ==
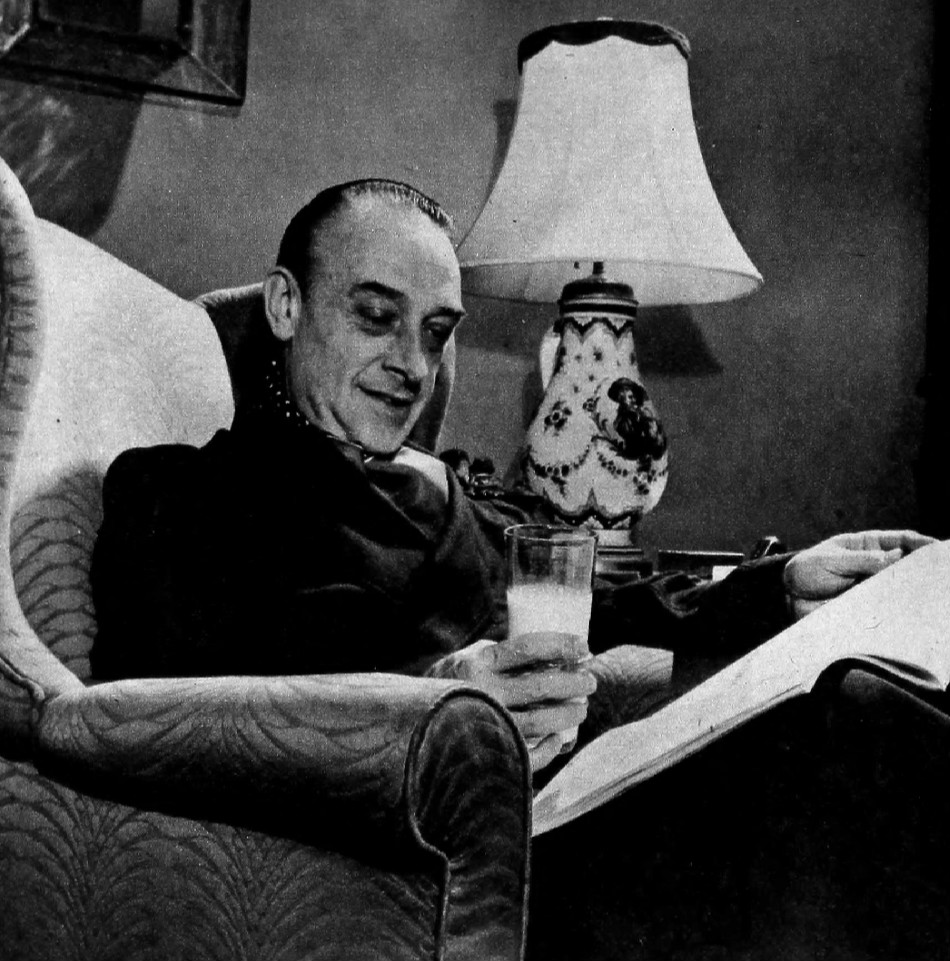
Gallop at home in 1951, where he also did his own decorating

In the mid 1940s, Frank Gallop met a beautiful chorus girl from Texas named Mary Lou Bentley (also Bently) who had been having a relationship with Walter Winchell. When her presence in the columnist's life became evident to his family and she realized he would not divorce his wife, she tried ending the relationship with Winchell and became Gallop's neighbor by moving into his Park Avenue apartment building.

A romance developed between the pair, and at some point before 1946, they were married. Winchell was unwilling to concede the end of their relationship and continued to pursue Bentley with flowers and other gifts. Gallop became the object of his wrath. Winchell was able to have him constantly followed by police. He also learned where Gallop was auditioning for announcing jobs and convinced radio program sponsors not to hire him. Gallop was fired from a soap opera announcing job because of Winchell's pressure. By 1948, the couple divorced.

Gallop liked being well-dressed, with a closet full of suits and ties for all occasions. He contended that the very strong coffee he brewed was wonderful, while his friends would ask for tea instead after sampling it. He admitted to being somewhat superstitious in some respects such as stopping at the same newsstand after work because he had been a customer there after his first Lights Out appearance. Gallop also said he disliked having the trait. In addition to doing his own decorating, Gallop collected art.

Remaining active in announcing into the 1970s, Gallop divided his time between homes in New York and Palm Beach, Florida. Despite being a former investment consultant, Gallop said in a 1958 interview that he had "never made a nickel in the market in my life."

== Bibliography ==
- Ansbro, George. I Have a Lady in the Balcony: Memoirs of a Broadcaster in Radio and Television. McFarland, 2000. ISBN 0-7864-0425-6, ISBN 978-0-7864-0425-4

== Discography ==
- "SH BANG" Narrator on Young People's Records.
- "Got a Match" ABC – Paramount 9931, 1958
- "The Ballad of Irving" – Kapp Records 45 rpm single, 1966
- When You're In Love, The Whole World Is Jewish. Kapp Records LP KRL-4506, 1966; Rhino Records CD/CS 71084, 1993 "The Ballad of Irving/You Don't Have To Be Jewish"
- "The Yiddish Are Coming, the Yiddish Are Coming". Kapp Records (1967).
- "How to be a Jewish American Princess". Kapp Records.
- Dr. Demento's Delites (Warner Brothers) and Dr. Demento's 20th Anniversary Collection, Rhino Records CD/CS 70743, 1991 "The Ballad of Irving"
- Would You Believe—Frank Gallop Sings?, Musicor Records LP, MM-2110 (mono), c1966. "The Son of Irving"
- Musicor 45 rpm single MU 1191, c1966 "The Son of Irving"
