= Anton Loeb =

The book cover of the little train that won a medal, 1947

Anton C. Loeb (31 March 1908 – 10 December 1984) was a cartoonist, illustrator and theatrical animator.

Loeb illustrated children's books in the late 1940s, including a collection of Aesop's Fables in a book called Storytime Favorites. Loeb worked primarily as one of Paramount's lead theatrical cartoon Background Painters the 1950s, and then moved on to TV animation in the 1960s. He worked for Fleischer Studios, which produced the Popeye cartoons, and did the illustrations for Allan Chaffee's version of The Wizard Of Oz, adapted from L. Frank Baum's 1900 classic original. This abridged version was published in 1950 by Random House.

Loeb was born in Hungary on March 31, 1908, and raised in New York City. When he was 15 he was a scenic designer for the Metropolitan Opera Company. He had already attended the Academy of Design in New York under the sponsorship of banker George Baker. Loeb also sang in the Brooklyn Academy of Music, moved on to Broadway and the lead in musical comedies but laryngitis robbed him of his ability to sing.

== Personal life and death ==
He was married on Feb 14, 1939 to Frances Ravitz in Miami, Florida, where he was working on the Fleischer Studios cartoons. After moving back to New York when Paramount took over the Fleischer studio, he returned to Florida in 1949 and lived on Di Lido Island.

He died of cancer in Miami on December 10, 1984, at the age of 76.
