= Cecil Roy =

American actress (1900–1995)

- Born: Cecil H. Roy; October 2, 1900; Saint Paul, Minnesota, U.S.
- Died: January 26, 1995 (aged 94); Englewood, New Jersey, U.S.
- Occupation: Actress

Cecil H. Roy (October 2, 1900 – January 26, 1995) was an American actress who was well-known in radio broadcasting of the 1930s and 1940s as The Girl of a Thousand Voices.

== Early life ==
Born in St. Paul, Minnesota, she grew up in Oklahoma. Her father was an opera singer.

== Career ==
Roy entered radio during the 1930s, appearing on The Rise of the Goldbergs, The Henry Aldrich Show, Pepper Young's Family. Marthy and Elmer, and many other programs.

The "Girl of a Thousand Voices" label came about due to her ability to immediately shift through a wide range of characters and ages, from an elderly woman to a crying baby.

Roy's roles on radio programs included those shown in the following table.

| Program | Role |
|---|---|
| The Adventures of Dari-Dan | Stanley Hall |
| Amanda of Honeymoon Hill | Aunt Mazie |
| Aunt Jenny's Real Life Stories | infant |
| Big Sister | Jerry Jr. |
| Kaltenmeyer's Kindergarten | Daisy Dean |
| Ma Perkins | Junior Fitz |
| The Timid Soul | Madge Milquetoast |
| Quiet Please | Carol Sue |

She also was featured "enacting dilemmas" on Daily Dilemmas.

=== Animation ===
Between 1943 and 1964, she provided voices for numerous animated cartoons, specializing in children's voices, originating the voice of Little Lulu.

=== Recordings ===
Her recordings for children included the role of Winnie the Pooh on a recording with Jimmy Stewart, and Cindy Bear on a Yogi Bear record. Through Replica Records, Roy released at least one 33 rpm recording ("Helen's Holiday"), as well as three 45 rpm recordings with Helen Searles Westbrook and Betty Barrie: 1) Buddy's Butterfly 2) The Thistle/Buddy's Garden 3) Christmas Eve/Plasco Toys.

== Personal life ==
Roy spoke German and French and sang in Italian and French. She was reported to have a "polished repertoire of 20 dialects." Her long-time partner, Beni (missing last name), was a hairdresser in New York City. His clientele included many Broadway and vaudeville stars. Cecil Roy also lived in Cozy Lake, Oak Ridge, New Jersey. Her "summer" or weekend home was a place where she entertained many of the neighborhood children with her accordion, singing, and voice talents.
