= Color Classics =

Animated film series

- Directed by: Dave Fleischer
- Story by: William Turner; Dave Fleischer; Isadore Sparber; David Tendlar; Joe Stultz; George Manuell; Bob Wickersham
- Produced by: Max Fleischer
- Music by: Murray Mencher; Jack Scholl; Charles Tobias; Phil Spitalny; Sammy Timberg; George Steiner; Charles Newman; Bob Rothberg; Vee Lawnhurst; Tot Seymour; King Ross
- Animation by: Seymour Kneitel; Roland Crandall; William Henning; Willard Bowsky; David Tendlar; Nicholas Tafuri; George Germanetti; Eli Brucker; Dave Hoffman; William Sturm; Myron Waldman; Sam Stimson; Edward Nolan; Abner Kneitel; Hicks Lokey; Joe Oriolo; Graham Place; Arnold Gillespie; Orestes Calpini; Tony Pabian; Nelson Demorset; George Moreno; Shamus Culhane; Al Eugster; Stan Quackenbush; Otto Feuer
- Color process: 2-strip Cinecolor (Poor Cinderella); 2-strip Technicolor (1934–1935); 3-strip Technicolor (1936–1941)
- Production companies: Paramount Pictures; Fleischer Studios
- Distributed by: Paramount Pictures (original and current holder); National Telefilm Associates (reissue)
- Running time: 6 — 10 minutes
- Country: United States
- Language: English

Color Classics are a series of animated short films produced by Fleischer Studios for Paramount Pictures from 1934 to 1941 as a competitor to Walt Disney's Silly Symphonies and Wonderful World of Color. As the name implies, all of the shorts were made in color format, with the first entry of the series, Poor Cinderella (1934), being the first color cartoon produced by the Fleischer studio. There were 36 shorts produced in this series.

== History ==
In 1932, Herbert Kalmus developed the three-strip Technicolor process, which used three separate film strips (Red, Green and Blue) to accurately reproduce a full spectrum of color. Kalmus approached several Hollywood studios, attempting to interest them in making color films. Max Fleischer – a technological innovator himself with a keen interest in science - immediately saw the potential in the technology, and tried to convince his distributor, Paramount Pictures, to let him make cartoons in color. However, since Paramount was on the verge of bankruptcy at the time, they were unwilling to spend the additional costs required of color films, and declined Kalmus’s offer.

Walt Disney accepted Kalmus's offer instead, and produced the first cartoon in three-strip Technicolor Flowers and Trees (1932), which later went onto win the inaugural Academy Award for Best Short Subject, Cartoons. It was only after the success of Walt Disney’s color Silly Symphonies and Wonderful World of Color series, as well as continual lobbying from Max Fleischer, that Paramount head Adolph Zukor finally agreed to let Fleischer make a series of color cartoons - entitled Color Classics. However by this time, Disney had already signed a three-year exclusivity deal with the Technicolor corporation for that temporarily prohibited any other studio from using the three-strip process. Therefore, Fleischer - along with all other animation producers at the time - was forced to use the inferior Cinecolor (red and blue) and two-strip Technicolor (red and green) processes.

In order to compensate for the lack of color range in his cartoons, Fleischer collaborated with John E. “Johnny” Burks – a studio “jack-of-all-trades” who worked in his Camera Department – and they invented the Stereoptical Process. This involved creating miniature three-dimensional sets (referred to as "setbacks") that were placed on a horizonal turntable in front of a camera. The cels of the animated characters were shot on a glass plane mounted in front of these "setbacks" which the camera photographed through, while the turntable was slightly rotated for each frame. In addition certain parts of the set were placed in the foreground in front of the glass plane and animation cels to give a more immersive effect.

Max Fleischer filed the first patent for the Steroptical Process was filed on November 2, 1933 and filed a second on December 5, 1936. While the Stereoptical Process was also used in Fleischer's black and white cartoons during the mid-to-late 1930s (Betty Boop, Popeye the Sailor and Screen Songs) they were predominately showcased in the Color Classic series. The "setbacks" were constructed out of paper-mache, balsa wood, clay and cardboard. Burks would work with the 'head animators' and layout supervisors, to coordinate the animation with the miniature sets. Initially there was a disconnect between the painted backgrounds and the "setbacks", but this was eventually solved by having members of the Background Department paint the models. Fleischer's Stereoptical Process received high praise, and pre-dated Disney's multiplane camera by several years. Max's son Richard Fleischer wrote of the Multiplane camera: "Disney got a lot of credit for creating this new technique. My father got an ulcer.”

The first cartoon in the Color Classic was Poor Cinderella - featuring Betty Boop (with red hair and turquoise eyes) and shot in Cinecolor. All subseqent Color Classics until the end of 1935 were shot in two-strip Technicolor. In September 1935, Walt Disney's exclusivity over the three-strip Technicolor process expired, allowing Fleischer and other animation studios to make cartoons in the three-strip method. The first Color Classic in three-strip Technicolor was Somewhere in Dreamland (1936).

While most entries in the Color Classics were one-shot cartoons, two cartoons - Educated Fish (1937) and Hunky and Spunky (1938) - did spawn a few sequels and sub-series due to them being nominated for the Academy Award. Paramount routinely submitted Fleischer's color cartoons for consideration since they thought it was their best chance of beating Disney for the Oscar. However due to Fleischer's more primitive animation and design style, the Fleischer color cartoons looked crude compared to that of Disney, and continuously lost. As Richard Fleischer wrote: "I once asked my father if he ever envied Disney's ability to cop so many accolades. His answer was straightforward and telling. ‘Just remember one thing,’ he said. ‘You can't eat medals.’”

While the Stereopcial Process was impressive and added to the popularity to the Fleischer cartoons, it was also time consuming and expensive, adding considerably to the cost of each cartoon. For this reason it tended to only be uses for one scene per-cartoon. When Fleischer Studios moved to Miami in 1938, Max Fleischer reluctantly began to reduce the use of the Stereoptical Process due to the high production costs. The last significant use of the Stereoptical Process was in the Color Classic cartoon Ants in the Plants (1940).

The final Color Classic cartoon - Vitamin Hay - was released in 1941, and featured the characters Hunky and Spunky. Reportedly the Fleischers decided to end the Color Classic series in the early-1940s, since by that point the novelty of cartoons in color had largely worn-off with audiences. The Color Classics were replaced with the Gabby series. A similar series would be started by Fleischer's successor Famous Studios during 1943, with the name Noveltoons.

== Later statuses ==
During 1955, Paramount sold all rights to the Color Classics cartoons to television distributor U.M. & M. TV Corporation. U.M. & M. altered the original beginning credits sequences for some of the shorts, to remove all references to the names "Paramount Pictures" and "Technicolor", and to add their own copyright notices, but did not modify the original negatives due to the complexity of Technicolor materials. Before the re-titling could be finished, U.M. & M. was bought by National Telefilm Associates (NTA). Instead of re-filming the openings, NTA obscured the references to the Paramount and Technicolor names by placing black bars over the original title cards and Copyright notices. Only a few Color Classics had their title cards redone by U.M. & M., among them Poor Cinderella (re-filmed in black and white to match the other Betty Boop shorts), Greedy Humpty Dumpty, Play Safe, Christmas Comes But Once a Year, Bunny Mooning, Little Lambkins, and Vitamin Hay.

NTA distributed the Color Classics to television, yet allowed the Copyrights on all of the shorts to lapse except The Tears of an Onion. Many public domain video distributors have released television prints of Color Classics shorts for Home Video. The UCLA Film and Television Archive has, through the assistance of Republic Pictures (successor company to U.M. & M. and NTA), retained original theatrical copies of all of the shorts, which have periodically been shown in revival movie houses and by Cable Television.

Ironically, original distributor Paramount has, through their 1999 acquisition of Republic, regained ownership of the Color Classics, including the original elements. Olive Films (current licensee for Republic, and which currently has home video rights) has, to date, not announced any plans to release the Color Classics officially to DVD or Blu-Ray.

During 2003, animation archivist Jerry Beck conceived a definitive DVD box set of all the Color Classics, excluding The Tears of an Onion, and tried to enlist Republic Pictures' help in releasing this set. After being refused, Kit Parker Films (in association with VCI Entertainment) offered to provide the best available 35mm and 16mm prints of the Color Classics from Parker's archives to create the box set Somewhere in Dreamland: The Max Fleischer Color Classics. These "interim restored versions" contain digitally recreated Paramount titles; the U.M. & M.-modified prints had to have their title cards as well as their Animator Credits recreated. The Tears of an Onion was not included in the set, as it remains copyrighted by Republic successor Melange Pictures.

In 2021, after decades of being shown in altered, worn, and "beet-red" prints, the Fleischer estate (in co-operation with Paramount Pictures) launched an initiative to formally restore the entire classic animation library from the surviving original negatives, beginning with Somewhere In Dreamland, which has had its restored World Premiere on the MeTV network in December of said year as part of the Toon In With Me Christmas special, presented uncut with its original front-and-end Paramount titles. In May 2026, Thad Komorowski's label Cartoon Logic (distributed by ClassicFlix) released a Blu-ray collection called Fleischer Cartoons: Greatest Hits, Volume 1, which features 20 cartoons, 3 of which are Color Classics.

== Filmography ==
Many of the cartoons do not have recurring characters, but Poor Cinderella featured Betty Boop, while Christmas Comes But Once a Year featured Grampy and Tommy Cod. Towards the end, Hunky and Spunky were featured characters.

All cartoons released during 1934 and 1935 were produced in two-strip Technicolor, except for Poor Cinderella which was produced in Cinecolor. All shorts from 1936 and onward were produced in three-strip Technicolor. All films were directed by Dave Fleischer.

#	Title	Release Date	Animators	Notes
1	Poor Cinderella	August 3, 1934	Seymour Kneitel, Roland Crandall & William Henning	First and only Betty Boop cartoon in color and her only appearance in the series.
2	Little Dutch Mill	October 26, 1934	Willard Bowsky & David Tendlar	
3	An Elephant Never Forgets	January 2, 1935	Seymour Kneitel & Roland Crandall	
4	The Song of the Birds	March 1, 1935	Seymour Kneitel & Roland Crandall	
5	The Kids in the Shoe	May 19, 1935	Seymour Kneitel & Roland Crandall	
6	Dancing on the Moon	July 12, 1935	Seymour Kneitel & Roland Crandall	
7	Time for Love	September 6, 1935	Willard Bowsky & Nicholas Tafuri	
8	Musical Memories	November 8, 1935	Seymour Kneitel & Roland Crandall	
9	Somewhere in Dreamland	January 17, 1936	Seymour Kneitel & Roland Crandall	
10	The Little Stranger	March 13, 1936	David Tendlar & Eli Brucker	
11	The Cobweb Hotel	May 15, 1936	David Tendlar & William Sturm	
12	Greedy Humpty Dumpty	July 10, 1936	David Tendlar & William Sturm	
13	Hawaiian Birds	August 28, 1936	Myron Waldman & Sam Stimson	
14	Play Safe	October 16, 1936	David Tendlar & Eli Brucker	
15	Christmas Comes But Once a Year	December 4, 1936	Seymour Kneitel & William Henning	
16	Bunny Mooning	February 12, 1937	Myron Waldman & Edward Nolan	
17	Chicken a La King	April 16, 1937	David Tendlar & Nicholas Tafuri	
18	A Car-Tune Portrait	June 26, 1937	David Tendlar & Nicholas Tafuri	
19	Peeping Penguins	August 26, 1937	Myron Waldman & Hicks Lokey	
20	Educated Fish	October 29, 1937	Myron Waldman & Hicks Lokey	Nominated for the 1937 Academy Award for Best Short Subject (Cartoons).
21	Little Lamby	November 12, 1937	David Tendlar & William Sturm	
22	The Tears of an Onion	February 26, 1938	David Tendlar & Joseph Oriolo	Copyright renewed by Paramount.
23	Hold It	April 29, 1938	David Tendlar & Nicholas Tafuri	
24	Hunky and Spunky	June 24, 1938	Myron Waldman & Graham Place	Nominated for the 1938 Academy Award for Best Short Subject (Cartoons).
25	All's Fair at the Fair	August 26, 1938	Myron Waldman & Graham Place	
26	The Playful Polar Bears	October 28, 1938	Myron Waldman & Graham Place	
27	Always Kickin'	January 29, 1939	Myron Waldman & Arnold Gillespie	Stars Hunky and Spunky.
28	Small Fry	April 21, 1939	Willard Bowsky & Orestes Calpini	
29	The Barnyard Brat	June 30, 1939	Myron Waldman & Anthony Pabian	Stars Hunky and Spunky.
30	The Fresh Vegetable Mystery	September 29, 1939	David Tendlar & William Sturm	
31	Little Lambkins	February 2, 1940	David Tendlar & Nelson Demorest	
32	Ants in the Plants	March 15, 1940	Myron Waldman & George Moreno	
33	A Kick in Time	May 17, 1940	James Culhane & Alfred Eugster	Stars Hunky and Spunky.
34	Snubbed by a Snob	July 19, 1940	Stanley Quackenbush & Arnold Gillespie	Stars Hunky and Spunky.
35	You Can't Shoe a Horse Fly	August 23, 1940	Myron Waldman & Sam Stimson	Stars Hunky and Spunky.
36	Vitamin Hay	August 22, 1941	David Tendlar & Otto Feuer	Stars Hunky and Spunky.

== See also ==
- Phantasies
- Noveltoons
- Modern Madcaps
- Animated Antics
- ComiColor Cartoons
- Happy Harmonies
- Merrie Melodies
- Rainbow Parade
- Silly Symphonies
- Swing Symphony
- Puppetoons
- Color Rhapsody
