= List of Pee-wee's Playhouse episodes =

This is the complete episode list for Pee-wee's Playhouse. A total of 45 half-hour episodes and 1 primetime special were recorded for CBS from 1986 until 1990.

== Series overview ==
Season	Episodes	Originally released	
Season	Episodes	First released	Last released
1	13	September 13, 1986	December 6, 1986
2	10	September 19, 1987	November 21, 1987
3	2	September 17, 1988	September 24, 1988
Christmas special		December 21, 1988	
4	10	September 16, 1989	November 18, 1989
5	10	September 15, 1990	November 17, 1990

== Episodes ==
=== Season 1 (1986) ===
No. overall	No. in season	Title	Directed by	Written by	Original release date	Prod. code
1	1	"Ice Cream Soup"	Stephen R. Johnson	George McGrath, John Paragon, Paul Reubens, Max Robert & Michael Varhol	September 13, 1986	101
Before Pee-wee's friends are forced to evacuate the pool due to rain, Pee-wee decides to make Ice Cream Soup, despite Randy getting carried away with too much chocolate syrup. Secret Word: Door; King of Cartoons: The Fresh Vegetable Mystery (1939)
2	2	"Luau for Two"	Stephen R. Johnson	George McGrath, John Paragon, Paul Reubens, Max Robert & Michael Varhol	September 20, 1986	102
Pee-wee wins dinner for two at a Hawaiian Restaurant, but then has to contemplate who he is going to take with him. He decides to throw a Luau party for all at his playhouse. Secret Word: Fun; King of Cartoons: Ants in the Plants (1940)
3	3	"Rainy Day"	Stephen R. Johnson	George McGrath, John Paragon, Paul Reubens, Max Robert & Michael Varhol	September 27, 1986	103
It is raining outside the playhouse, and Pee-wee tries to come up with all sorts of things to do, until he runs out of ideas and wishes the rain would stop. Secret Word: Help; King of Cartoons: Summertime (1935); Note: Only appearance of the housewife and Daryl the cop.
4	4	"Now You See Me, Now You Don't"	Stephen R. Johnson	George McGrath, John Paragon, Paul Reubens, Max Robert & Michael Varhol	October 4, 1986	104
During a Magic Show he puts on for his friends, Pee-wee makes himself invisible, and has to become visible again. Secret Word: Little; King of Cartoons: Smile, Darn Ya, Smile! (1931)
5	5	"Just Another Day"	Stephen R. Johnson	George McGrath, John Paragon, Paul Reubens, Max Robert & Michael Varhol	October 11, 1986	105
Cowboy Curtis shows Pee-wee the traits of how to be a Cowboy. Secret Word: Back; King of Cartoons: Old Mother Hubbard (1935)
6	6	"Beauty Makeover"	Stephen R. Johnson	George McGrath, John Paragon, Paul Reubens, Max Robert & Michael Varhol	October 18, 1986	106
Miss Yvonne says she can give the next person who steps into the playhouse a beauty makeover, and it ends up being Mrs. Steve. Secret Word: Time; King of Cartoons: The Three Bears (1935)
7	7	"The Restaurant"	Stephen R. Johnson	George McGrath, John Paragon, Paul Reubens, Max Robert & Michael Varhol	October 25, 1986	107
Pee-wee's the maitre d', waiter and cashier when he plays restaurant with Captain Carl. But all they have are peanut butter and jelly sandwiches. Secret Word: Day; King of Cartoons: Molly Moo-Cow and the Butterflies (1935)
8	8	"Ants in Your Pants"	Stephen R. Johnson	George McGrath, John Paragon, Paul Reubens, Max Robert & Michael Varhol	November 1, 1986	108
The Ants from Pee-wee's formicarium go missing and raid the entire playhouse. Secret Word: What; King of Cartoons: Flip the Frog: Puddle Pranks (1930)
9	9	"Monster in the Playhouse"	Stephen R. Johnson	George McGrath, John Paragon, Paul Reubens, Max Robert & Michael Varhol	November 8, 1986	109
Mrs. Steve warns Pee-wee that it is a one-eyed monster on the loose. Secret Word: Look; King of Cartoons: Jack Frost (1934)
10	10	"The Cowboy and the Cowntess"	Stephen R. Johnson	George McGrath, John Paragon, Paul Reubens, Max Robert & Michael Varhol	November 15, 1986	110
Miss Yvonne asks Cowboy Curtis out for a date, which makes him nervous. Cowntess suggests playing date role-playing, with Pee-wee as Miss Yvonne. Secret Word: Good; King of Cartoons: Mary's Little Lamb (1935)
11	11	"Stolen Apples"	Stephen R. Johnson	George McGrath, John Paragon, Paul Reubens, Max Robert & Michael Varhol	November 22, 1986	111
Randy steals Mrs. Steve's crab apples. Secret Word: There; King of Cartoons: Somewhere in Dreamland (1936)
12	12	"The Gang's All Here"	Stephen R. Johnson	George McGrath, John Paragon, Paul Reubens, Max Robert & Michael Varhol	November 29, 1986	112
The Playhouse Gang is joined by a new member (an adult) named Rusty, and Pee-wee assigns them secret names. However, Pee-Wee has to put his foot down when the gang goes out of control. Secret Word: Okay; King of Cartoons: Smile, Darn Ya, Smile! (1931)
13	13	"Party"	Stephen R. Johnson	George McGrath, John Paragon, Paul Reubens, Max Robert & Michael Varhol	December 6, 1986	113
Pee-wee throws a party for all of his friends in the playhouse. Secret Word: This; King of Cartoons: Bunny Mooning (1937) Note: Final appearances of Dixie, Tito, Captain Carl, Mrs. Steve, Elvis, Cher, Opal and the salesman.

=== Season 2 (1987) ===
No. overall	No. in season	Title	Directed by	Written by	Original release date	Prod. code
14	1	"Open House"	Guy Louthan & Paul Reubens	George McGrath, Paul Reubens & Max Robert	September 19, 1987	114
Pee-wee and his friends help renovate the playhouse and Pee-wee makes sun tea for snack time. Secret Word: House; King of Cartoons: Philips Broadcast of 1938 (1938) Note: First appearances of Billy Baloney, Ricardo, Floory, Mrs. René and Clockey. Note #2: The sun tea segment was cut from Fox Family reruns, as making homemade sun tea can breed bacteria that can cause illness and/or death in some people. The Image Entertainment DVD adds a warning in the beginning that states that making sun tea can be dangerous.
15	2	"Puppy in the Playhouse"	Wayne Orr & Paul Reubens	George McGrath, Paul Reubens & Max Robert	September 26, 1987	115
A lost dog comes to the playhouse, who turns out to be Reba, the Mail Lady's. Secret Word: Over; King of Cartoons: To Spring (1936)
16	3	"Store"	Wayne Orr & Paul Reubens	George McGrath, Paul Reubens & Max Robert	October 3, 1987	116
Cowboy Curtis sings a little song, and Pee-wee, Curtis and Miss Yvonne play "Store". Secret Word: More; King of Cartoons: Making 'em Move (1931)
17	4	"Pee-wee Catches a Cold"	Wayne Orr & Paul Reubens	George McGrath, Paul Reubens & Max Robert	October 10, 1987	117
Pee-wee finds himself incapacitated and cranky when he comes down with a cold and is taken care of by Ricardo and Miss Yvonne. Secret Word: Out; King of Cartoons: The Sunshine Makers (1935)
18	5	"Why Wasn't I Invited?"	Wayne Orr & Paul Reubens	George McGrath, Paul Reubens & Max Robert	October 17, 1987	118
The Cowntess invites pretty much everyone to her party except for Pee-wee, Magic Screen, and Chairry. Secret Word: All; King of Cartoons: Piano Tooners (1932)
19	6	"Tons of Fun"	Wayne Orr & Paul Reubens	George McGrath, Paul Reubens & Max Robert	October 24, 1987	119
When Pee-wee goes out to play with the Playhouse Gang, Miss Yvonne and Cowboy Curtis have some fun around the playhouse. Secret Word: Cool; King of Cartoons: Philips Broadcast of 1938 (1938)
20	7	"School"	Wayne Orr & Paul Reubens	George McGrath, Paul Reubens & Max Robert	October 31, 1987	120
The Playhouse Gang comes over and they and Pee-wee play a game of "school" and learn about Christopher Columbus and the Declaration of Independence. Secret Word: Easy; King of Cartoons: Pagan Moon (1932)
21	8	"Spring"	Wayne Orr & Paul Reubens	George McGrath, Paul Reubens & Max Robert	November 7, 1987	121
On the first day of spring, Pee-wee plants seeds and watches as they grow very quickly. The King of Cartoons visits and introduces his wife and son. Secret Word: Begin; King of Cartoons: Wedding in the Coral Sea (1944)
22	9	"Playhouse in Outer Space"	Wayne Orr & Paul Reubens	George McGrath, Paul Reubens & Max Robert	November 11, 1987 (prime-time); November 14, 1987 (Saturday)	122
The playhouse gets abducted by an alien named Zyzzybalubah who forces everyone to be his new friend. Secret Word: Zyzzybalubah; King of Cartoons: Ship of the Ether (1934)
23	10	"Pajama Party"	Wayne Orr & Paul Reubens	George McGrath, Paul Reubens & Max Robert	November 11, 1987 (prime-time); November 21, 1987 (Saturday)	123
Pee-wee hosts a slumber party at the playhouse, and marries a bowl of fruit salad. Secret Word: Watch (Magic Screen does the Secret Word routine in the episode); King of Cartoons: Musical Memories (1935)

=== Season 3 (1988) ===
Season 3 only had two episodes, plus the primetime Christmas special, due to production being halted by the 1988 Writers Guild of America strike and also by the production of Big Top Pee-wee. On February 2, 1989, The Pittsburgh Press stated that both episodes had been completed, but it was unclear when they would air. On March 26, The Courier stated in a Q&A that one of the episodes had already aired, but was unsure of the other one. Finally, on August 8, The Chillicothe Gazette stated that the other Season 3 episode would be shown with the ones from Season 4 in the Fall of that year.

No. overall	No. in season	Title	Directed by	Written by	Original release date	Prod. code
24	1	"Reba Eats and Pterri Runs"	Wayne Orr & Paul Reubens	John Paragon	September 17, 1988	124
Much to the chagrin of both Jambi and Reba, Pee-wee wishes Reba over to the playhouse on her day off so she can mail his pen pal letter. Pee-wee invites Reba for some breakfast. Pterri no longer feels wanted around the playhouse, so he runs away. Pee-wee and his friends were disappointed that Pterri ran away from the Playhouse, but Pterri comes back. Secret Word: Now; King of Cartoons: Farm Foolery (1949)
25	2	"To Tell the Tooth"	Wayne Orr & Paul Reubens	John Paragon	September 24, 1988	125
Pee-wee gets a toothache, but tries to avoid going to the dentist. Secret Word: It; King of Cartoons: An Elephant Never Forgets (1935)

=== Special (1988) ===
Title	Directed by	Written by	Original release date	Prod. code
"Pee-wee's Playhouse Christmas Special"	Wayne Orr & Paul Reubens	John Paragon & Paul Reubens	December 21, 1988	10X
It is Christmas at the Playhouse, and Pee-wee has a large wish list for Santa. Secret Word: Year; King of Cartoons: Christmas Comes But Once a Year (1936) Special guest stars: Frankie Avalon, Annette Funicello, Charo, Grace Jones, k.d. lang, Dinah Shore, Little Richard, Cher, the Del Rubio Triplets, Magic Johnson, Princess Zsa Zsa, Whoopi Goldberg, Oprah Winfrey, Joan Rivers, and the UCLA Men's Choir. Filming dates: November 14–25, 1988

=== Season 4 (1989) ===
Unlike before, the final two seasons were filmed back-to-back. On June 16, 1989, Marilyn Beck wrote in her Syndicated Gossip Column that Reubens would start production in July on 20 new episodes (10 for the 1989–90 Season and 10 for the 1990–91 Season), not counting the other Season 3 leftover.

No. overall	No. in season	Title	Directed by	Written by	Original release date	Prod. code
26	1	"Dr. Pee-wee and the Del Rubios"	John Paragon & Paul Reubens	John Paragon	September 16, 1989	201
Dr. Pee-wee takes care of Reba's splinter. The Del Rubio Triplets come over to play Pass the Orange and perform their rendition of "These Boots Are Made for Walkin'". Secret Word: Well; King of Cartoons: Hunky and Spunky (1938) Note: First appearances of Chandelier, El Hombre and Pee-Wee's dog, Roosevelt.
27	2	"Fire in the Playhouse"	John Paragon & Paul Reubens	John Paragon	September 23, 1989	202
Pee-wee dreams he is a superhero. While making homemade bread, Randy sets the oven way too high causing a fire to break out in the playhouse. Secret Word: One; King of Cartoons: The Stork Market (1949)
28	3	"Love That Story"	John Paragon & Paul Reubens	Max Robert	September 30, 1989	203
Pee-wee and Miss Yvonne play "Library". Ricardo joins them to tell their favorite stories. Secret Word: End; King of Cartoons: Spring Song (1949) (The King of Cartoons does not appear)
29	4	"Sick, Did Somebody Say Sick?"	John Paragon & Paul Reubens	John Paragon	October 7, 1989	204
When Pee-wee briefly steps out, Randy attempts to hijack the show. Jambi becomes sick and the genie doctor, Dr. Jinga Janga (Bernard Fox) makes a house call. Secret Word: Go (Randy hijacks the secret word routine and adds bark like a dog to it instead of screaming to it in the episode); King of Cartoons: To Spring (1936)
30	5	"Miss Yvonne's Visit"	John Paragon & Paul Reubens	Doug Cox & John Moody	October 14, 1989	205
While Miss Yvonne's house is being painted, Pee-wee invites her to stay the night. Secret Word: Nice; King of Cartoons: None
31	6	"Rebarella"	John Paragon & Paul Reubens	Lynne Marie Stewart & Mimi Pond	October 21, 1989	206
Pee-wee, Miss Yvonne and the other playhouse puppets play "airplane", and later, prepare Reba for her big date. Secret Word: Stop; King of Cartoons: The Kids In the Shoe (1935) (The King of Cartoons does not appear)
32	7	"Heat Wave"	John Paragon & Paul Reubens	Rob Bragin	October 28, 1989	207
On an especially hot day in the Playhouse, Pee-wee plays "courtroom" to judge over Miss Yvonne and Mrs. René wearing the same one-of-a-kind dress. Secret Word: Here and Hear; King of Cartoons: The Song of the Birds (1935)
33	8	"Chairry-Tee Drive"	John Paragon & Paul Reubens	John Paragon	November 4, 1989	208
While searching for the Cowntess' pencil sharpener he borrowed from her years ago, Pee-wee decides to start a clothing drive. Secret Word: Wait; King of Cartoons: None
34	9	"Let's Play Office"	John Paragon & Paul Reubens	John Paragon & Lynne Marie Stewart	November 11, 1989	209
Pee-wee and Miss Yvonne play "office" with Pee-wee as the boss and Miss Yvonne as the secretary. Pee-wee makes fruit punch for a snack. Secret Word: That; King of Cartoons: Little Lambkins (1940)
35	10	"I Remember Curtis"	John Paragon & Paul Reubens	John Paragon	November 18, 1989	210
Cowboy Curtis leaves his lasso behind at the playhouse and Pee-wee and the gang reminisce in a Curtis-themed clip show. Secret Word: Remember; King of Cartoons: None

=== Season 5 (1990) ===
No. overall	No. in season	Title	Directed by	Written by	Original release date	Prod. code
36	1	"Conky's Breakdown"	John Paragon & Paul Reubens	John Moody & Doug Cox	September 15, 1990	211
Conky goes on the fritz, so Pee-wee calls a repairman (Jimmy Smits) to fix him. Miss Yvonne becomes smitten with the repairman. Secret Word: Great (It originally comes out as "Grrrrr", due to Conky's malfunction, and Pee-Wee tests it out on Chairry. After the scream, Conky manages to give Pee-Wee the actual secret word.); King of Cartoons: One More Time (1931)
37	2	"Mystery"	John Paragon & Paul Reubens	David Cohen & S.H. Schulman	September 22, 1990	212
Someone has been stealing things around the playhouse, and Pee-wee attempts to get to the bottom of it. Secret Word: Around; King of Cartoons: Farm Frolics (1941) (The King of Cartoons does not appear)
38	3	"Front Page Pee-wee"	John Paragon & Paul Reubens	John Moody & Doug Cox	September 29, 1990	213
Pee-wee decides to start his own newspaper, but Randy publishes false articles in it. Secret Word: How; King of Cartoons: The Little Red Hen (1934) (The King of Cartoons does not appear)
39	4	"Tango Time"	John Paragon & Paul Reubens	David Cohen & S.H. Schulman	October 6, 1990	214
Pee-wee watches two cartoons from the King of Cartoons. Pee-wee teaches Mrs. René how to tango. Pee-wee and Cowboy Curtis go through old photos in his photo album. Secret Word: Fast; King of Cartoons: Freddy the Freshman (1932) and Humpty Dumpty (1935)
40	5	"Playhouse Day"	John Paragon & Paul Reubens	Rob Bragin	October 13, 1990	215
All of Pee-wee's friends have to work, so Pee-wee makes up "Playhouse Day" to get them to come over. Secret Word: Thing; King of Cartoons: Fin'n Catty (1943)
41	6	"Accidental Playhouse"	John Paragon & Paul Reubens	John Moody & Doug Cox	October 20, 1990	216
Pee-wee's Japanese pen pal, Oki (Joey Miyashima), comes over to the Playhouse. Secret Word: Place (Mrs. René does the Secret Word routine in the episode.); King of Cartoons: The Interesting Guest (1951) and Sinkin' in the Bathtub (1930) (The King of Cartoons does not appear)
42	7	"Fun, Fun, Fun"	John Paragon & Paul Reubens	Max Robert	October 27, 1990	217
Pee-wee attempts to create a secret upside-down word, but decides it makes him too dizzy. Pee-wee and Miss Yvonne make cheeseballs. Pee-wee teaches viewers how to make a mobile. Secret Word: On (Initially mistaken to be "No" because Pee-Wee held the card upside down. "No" was briefly declared the secret upside-down word); King of Cartoons: Freddy the Freshman (1932)
43	8	"Camping Out"	John Paragon & Paul Reubens	John Paragon	November 3, 1990	218
In this rare episode that takes place outside of the playhouse, Pee-Wee has a dream called shape symphony. Pee-wee leaves Ms. Rene in charge while he and Cowboy Curtis go camping in the open range. Pee-wee has a conversation with Rhonda, the Picturephone operator. (Sandra Bernhard); Secret Word: Show (Globey does the Secret Word routine in the episode.); King of Cartoons: Allegretto (1936) and Balloon Land (1935) (The King of Cartoons does not appear)
44	9	"Something to Do"	John Paragon & Paul Reubens	John Paragon	November 10, 1990	219
Pee-wee is bored, so Jambi makes a list of things he can do. Secret Word: Do; King of Cartoons: None
45	10	"Playhouse for Sale"	John Paragon & Paul Reubens	John Paragon	November 17, 1990	220
With Pee-wee out, Miss Yvonne finds a "for sale" sign outside the playhouse, and immediately assumes that Pee-wee is going to sell the playhouse. Miss Yvonne and the playhouse puppets all reminisce about the good times around the playhouse in the finale clip show. They later learn that Pee-wee was merely selling lemonade, but the "Lemonade" part of the sign fell off. Secret Word: Word (Miss Yvonne does the Secret Word routine in the episode.); King of Cartoons: None
