= U.M. & M. TV Corporation =

Defunct American television syndicator

- Type: Film distributor
- Industry: Television
- Founded: 1954; 72 years ago
- Defunct: 1957; 69 years ago
- Fate: Acquired by National Telefilm Associates
- Successor: National Telefilm Associates

U.M. & M. TV Corporation was an American media company best known as the original purchaser of the pre-October 1950 short films and cartoons produced by Paramount Pictures, excluding Popeye and Superman. The initials stand for United Film Service (which once employed Walt Disney and other animators many years earlier), MPA TV (Motion Picture Advertising Service) of New Orleans, and Minot T.V.

Operations of the three above-mentioned companies were consolidated into a new company, U.M. & M., in October 1954. The companies were previously producing TV commercials. Matty Fox, head of Motion Pictures for Television, signed a ten-year agreement with U.M. & M. to handle sub-distribution of its TV series.

U.M. & M. handled the physical distribution of the television series Paris Precinct and Sherlock Holmes, among others. It did not market the shows to TV stations, leaving the actual syndication to Guild Films.

== Deals ==
In 1955, Paramount Pictures announced it was selling its short films and cartoons, and even a few of its features, including the Max Fleischer animated features Gulliver's Travels and Mr. Bug Goes to Town.

Represented by Alfred W. Schwalberg, a former Paramount sales executive, U.M. & M. won the bid on December 28, 1955, buying 1,600 short subjects for $3.5 million. U.M. & M. got most of the pre-October 1950 material that Paramount put up for sale except for the Popeye cartoons (including the Betty Boop cartoon Popeye the Sailor)—which were sold separately to Associated Artists Productions at a higher price and are now owned by Warner Bros. through Turner Entertainment Co.—and the Superman cartoons, due to their rights reverting from Paramount to National Periodical Publications (now DC Comics) after the studio's film rights to the character expired.

The material that U.M. & M. obtained from Paramount also included many live-action short subjects. The comedy shorts starred Burns and Allen, Robert Benchley, W. C. Fields, Eddie Cantor, Fred Allen, Jack Benny, Karl Dane & George K. Arthur, Tom Howard & George Shelton, and The Yacht Club Boys, among many other stage, screen, and radio comedians. There were dozens of musical shorts: most were big-band reels with Cab Calloway, Duke Ellington, Artie Shaw, Pinky Tomlin, Rudy Vallee, Louis Armstrong, and other popular orchestras of the 1930s; others were devoted to individual performers like Ethel Merman, Ginger Rogers, Eddie Peabody, Lillian Roth, and Ruth Etting.

Other short-subject series in the sale included:

- Mack Sennett Comedies – two reels; talking comedies produced in 1932 and 1933)
- Hedda Hopper's Hollywood – one reel; behind-the-scenes glimpses of moviemaking, hosted by the famous gossip columnist
- Speaking of Animals – one reel; comedies with live-action animals speaking with animated mouths -- produced by Jerry Fairbanks (now owned by Shields Pictures)
- Paramount Pictorials (retitled U.M. & M. Pictorials for television) – one reel; magazines of human-interest stories
- Screen Souvenirs – one reel; compilations of silent-film highlights
- Shorty the Chimp – one reel; live-action misadventures of a trained chimpanzee; reissued by Universal Pictures in the 1940s
- Musical Parades – two reels; live-action musical shorts of the mid-1940s, originally filmed in Technicolor

Many of the live-action subjects were licensed from U.M. & M.'s successor National Telefilm Associates by home-movie distributor Blackhawk Films. Blackhawk reprinted them on 16mm and 8mm film from 1968 to 1972, and many of these prints survive in private collections today.

Almost all of the cartoons included in the TV sale were produced by the Max Fleischer studio and its successor Famous Studios:

- Animated Antics (by Max Fleischer or Charley Bowers)
- Inkwell Imps (the Max Fleischer Ko-Ko the Clown cartoons that were originally distributed by Paramount)
- Screen Songs (except the last six shorts, which were sold to Harvey Films and are now owned by DreamWorks Classics)
- Talkartoons (early Paramount sound cartoon series)
- Betty Boop
- Color Classics
- Gabby
- Stone Age Cartoons
- The Fleischer two-reelers Raggedy Ann and Raggedy Andy and The Raven
- Almost all Noveltoons released prior to October 1950 (including three early appearances from Casper and the first five Little Audrey shorts)
- Little Lulu shorts produced by Famous Studios
- George Pal Puppetoons

The latest-released cartoon in the package was the Screen Songs cartoon, Boos in the Nite, released September 22, 1950. A total of 513 animated productions (shorts and features) from Fleischer, Famous, and George Pal were included in the package. The package was eyed by NBC for airing nationally, but this deal apparently fell through. ABC would air a repackaging of many Paramount cartoons released after September 1950 once these cartoons were sold to Harvey Films.

== Retitling and marketing the Paramount shorts ==
At the insistence of Paramount Pictures, which did not want its company name or mountain logo appearing on television at the time, U.M. & M. replaced the Paramount logo with its (usually) blue shield logo, and removed all references to Paramount Pictures except for the phrase "Adolph Zukor presents". Copyright notices were updated, with the claimant now presented as "U.M. & M. TV Corp.". It is believed that U.M. & M. and NTA assumed that TV viewers would not link Zukor's name with Paramount Pictures, which Zukor founded. However, some U.M. & M. and NTA prints would indeed omit or black out Zukor's name.

U.M. & M. color prints of Paramount cartoons usually have the opening credits listed in yellow print on a red background. Eventually, U.M. & M. started preserving the original credits, but continued to remove references to Paramount, Technicolor, Cinecolor, and Polacolor since the television prints were done in either Eastmancolor or Deluxe. The Eastmancolor prints generally have faded to red since their original manufacture.

For the black-and-white cartoons and shorts, U.M. & M. removed the Paramount logos from the original negatives and substituted its opening logo and an end card reading "A U.M. & M. TV Corp. Presentation" for the Paramount mountain. The Paramount copyright was replaced with the U.M. & M. copyright notice, but prints of Betty Boop cartoons have turned up with original Paramount copyright notices on the Olive Films releases of Betty Boop.

U.M. & M. began marketing the Paramount shorts and cartoons, at the expense of the live-action made-for-television products it was already syndicating. The marketing included a "Miss Cartoon" girl at their sales table at the NARTB convention in Chicago. Before all of the shorts could be retitled, National Telefilm Associates bought out the U.M. & M. package in May 1956 for $4 million. The U.M. & M. copyright notices continued to be present on the NTA prints. The shorts were syndicated under NTA's Panorama of Entertaining Programs, as well as sold for home-movie distribution.

For this reason, most of the color cartoons purchased by U.M. & M. appear with NTA titles, though a select few circulate with U.M. & M. openings and closings. Most Little Lulu cartoons circulate with U.M. & M. openings however. A few feature a revised U.M. & M. logo with the original credits intact, though all references to Paramount and Technicolor are blacked out. These prints contain the only titles where the word "Corporation" in the U.M. & M. copyright is actually spelled out, and not abbreviated "Corp."

NTA acquired the Republic Pictures name in 1984, and through several acquisitions was eventually merged into Paramount Pictures, which in turn was owned by Viacom (which acquired Paramount in 1994). At the end of 2005, Viacom split itself into two corporations, one called Viacom (still owning Paramount Pictures), and the other called CBS Corporation. As a result, Republic Pictures, an acquisition-only label owned by Paramount Pictures, now owns the theatrical distribution on behalf of Paramount Animation — all the more ironic since Paramount Pictures originally released the classic shorts in the first place — while Trifecta Entertainment & Media (inherited from CBS Television Distribution) owns the television distribution on behalf of Paramount Television Studios to the U.M. & M./NTA/Republic/Melange library, and Olive Films (under license from Paramount Home Entertainment) owns the home video distribution. Viacom and CBS re-merged on December 4, 2019, as ViacomCBS (later Paramount Global and currently known as Skydance Corporation).

However, restoration of the original Paramount openings to the black-and-white cartoons and shorts would be difficult, since U.M. & M. actually altered the original black-and-white negatives, although with today's CGI technology it is possible to replicate the original titles. The UCLA Film and Television Archive has restored many of the classic Paramount cartoons, complete with their original titles.

== See also ==
- FTC v. Motion Picture Advertising Service Co.
