= The Song of the Birds =

- Directed by: Dave Fleischer
- Produced by: Max Fleischer
- Music by: Sammy Timberg
- Animation by: Seymour Kneitel; Roland Crandall
- Production company: Fleischer Studios
- Distributed by: Paramount Pictures
- Release date: February 27, 1935
- Running time: 9 minutes
- Language: English

The Song of the Birds is a 1935 Color Classics cartoon. It concerns a destructive little boy with an air rifle who shoots a baby bird and is mortified when the bird's parents, and all the other birds, go into mourning.

== Plot ==
A flock of birds is teaching their young chicks to fly. The sun is shining, and all the birds are cheerfully singing. Meanwhile, a boy is having fun with an air rifle, shooting at everything in the house and destroying many of the items. He goes into the garden and shoots at the nest that the birds have barely saved. Next, he shoots a chick out of the sky, only to realize the gravity of what he has done. The chick's parents try to revive it, but to no avail.

The sky turns dark and stormy as the birds assemble and wail in mourning for the chick's funeral, complete with pallbearers and a grave digger. The boy watches from his bedroom window and is brought to tears, getting on his knees to pray. As the birds prepare to lower the chick into its grave, it begins raining. The young chick miraculously comes back to life. The birds resume to their cheerful singing and the sky clears. the boy, having learned this lesson, breaks his air rifle into pieces and pulls out a box of bird seeds for all the birds to enjoy. The chick and the boy share a seed as the cartoon ends.
