= Little Lambkins =

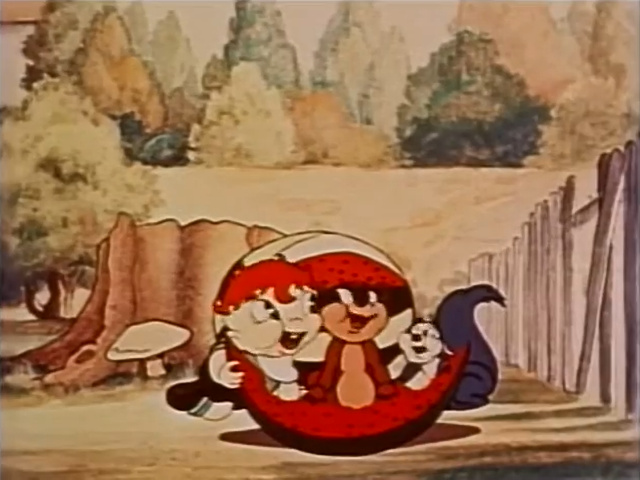
- Little Lambkins
- Directed by: Direction: Dave Fleischer
- Story by: Joe Stultz
- Produced by: Max Fleischer
- Starring: Margie Hines
- Music by: Winston Sharples; Sammy Timberg
- Animation by: Character animation: Dave Tendlar; Nelson Demorest (credited as N. Demorest)
- Layouts by: Character layout: Dave Tendlar(uncredited)
- Production company: Fleischer Studios
- Distributed by: Paramount Pictures
- Release date: February 2, 1940
- Running time: 6 minutes
- Language: English

Little Lambkins is a 1940 Color Classics cartoon.

== Plot ==
Mother puts her baby boy, Lambkins, in an outdoor playpen, but he is more mature than she realizes and quickly breaks out. With the help of a raccoon and a squirrel, they are soon raiding the watermelon patch. Mother returns. It turns out that it is moving day, and the family is moving to the city. Lambkins is not happy about leaving his animal friends. When they get to the new house, he sets about, sabotaging the kitchen and turning the icebox into an oven, the hot water tap into an ice dispenser, and the stove and phone into water spouts. Father and Mother flee back to the country house, and Lambkins is reunited with his animal friends.

== In popular culture ==
- In 1989, a shortened version of the cartoon was featured in the Pee-wee's Playhouse episode "Let’s Play Office," as part of the “King of Cartoons” segment regularly held on the show.
- In 1992, the cartoon was featured in episode 23 of Mickey's Mouse Tracks, a compilation show showcasing classic Disney cartoons and additional cartoons from other studios including Fleischer Studios.
