= All's Fair at the Fair =

1938 film by Dave Fleischer

- Title card
- Directed by: Dave Fleischer
- Produced by: Max Fleischer
- Starring: Jack Mercer (uncredited); Margie Hines (uncredited)
- Music by: Edward Heyman; Sammy Timberg
- Production company: Fleischer Studios
- Distributed by: Paramount Pictures
- Release date: August 26, 1938
- Country: United States
- Language: English

All's Fair at the Fair is a 1938 American seven-minute cartoon directed by Dave Fleischer. A Color Classic produced by Max Fleischer, it was distributed by Paramount as a promotion for the 1939 New York World's Fair.

== Reception ==
The Film Daily called the short a "novelty cartoon" and gave the following review:

A couple of sticks visit the fair grounds where the World's Fair is being held, and find themselves participating in a series of adventures with the ultra-modern mechanism operated by robots. Finally, they reach the dance pavilion, and the wife and husband each are taken in hand by robots and whirled around the floor. Other mechanical gags give them a marvelous meal, beauty and barber treatments, and clinical attention to restore their youth. Very clever and novel. A Max Fleischer cartoon in Technicolor.
