= Educated Fish =

- Directed by: Dave Fleischer
- Produced by: Max Fleischer
- Music by: Sammy Timberg (uncredited); Lou Fleischer (uncredited)
- Animation by: Hicks Lokey; Myron Waldman
- Color process: Technicolor
- Production company: Fleischer Studios
- Distributed by: Paramount Pictures
- Release date: October 29, 1937
- Running time: 7:30
- Language: English

Educated Fish is a 1937 animated short film that was part of Paramount's Color Classics series. The film was nominated for Best Animated Short at the 10th Academy Awards.

== Plot ==
In an underwater school for fish, the bad boy, Tommy Cod, would rather play pinball in his desk than recite the daily lesson about hooks, fishing poles, and lines so strong. Tommy is locked out of class by the teacher to study harder. He learns this lesson the hard way when being caught by a fisherman's bait.

== Preservation ==
Educated Fish was preserved by the Academy Film Archive, in conjunction with the UCLA Film and Television Archive, in 2013.
