= King for a Day (1940 film) =

- Directed by: Dave Fleischer; Directing animator: Willard Bowsky
- Story by: Joseph E. Stultz
- Produced by: Max Fleischer
- Starring: Pinto Colvig; Jack Mercer
- Music by: Uncredited musical supervision: Lou Fleischer; Uncredited musical direction: Winston Sharples; Musical arrangement: Sammy Timberg
- Animation by: Character animation: Willard Bowsky; James Davis
- Color process: Technicolor
- Production company: Fleischer Studios
- Distributed by: Paramount Pictures
- Release date: October 18, 1940
- Running time: 7 minutes
- Country: United States
- Language: English

The Cartoon

King for a Day is a 1940 animated short film featuring Gabby released by Paramount Pictures in the Max Fleischer Cartoon series. The cartoon was released on October 18, 1940. It was the first entry of the Gabby series, the spin-off cartoon series of Gulliver's Travels.

== Plot ==
Gabby is a Lilliputian mailman delivering a confidential letter for King Little of Lilliput. Since the King is taking a bath, Gabby waits for him to finish. Eyeing the royal crown and robes, Gabby tries them on. However, King Little catches him in the act. Gabby nervously returns the crown and robes and hands the King his letter before dashing off. "So, he’d like to be king," Little chuckles as he opens his letter: "Dear Majesty, please be at home to-day. I have orders to shoot you! Sincerely - yours". Shocked at what he takes to be a death threat, the King has a frightened Gabby fetched immediately. Fearing for his safety, Little asks Gabby if he would like to be king for a day, an offer eagerly accepted by Gabby, who is surprised the King is not upset with him anymore. As Little hides, Gabby reads the letter. Since he is Little's unknowing decoy, he believes it is addressed to him. He fears for his life, realizing the author is a potential assassin. Gabby then frantically runs from and fights an enemy who is not even present. Believing he has vanquished the assassin when he fends off part of a suit of armor, Gabby triumphantly assures Little that the king is safe. Little congratulates Gabby and dismisses him just as an unknown figure arrives to "shoot" the King as promised. Little and Gabby argue over who is the king, and Gabby runs off just as there's an explosion. However, Little is still alive when the smoke clears: the man is revealed to be just a photographer (similar to Snitch), and the photo is not at all flattering.
