= Peeping Penguins =

1937 film by Dave Fleischer

- Title card
- Directed by: Direction: Dave Fleischer; Director of animation: Myron Waldman
- Produced by: Max Fleischer; Adolph Zukor (presents)
- Music by: Sammy Timberg; Bob Rothberg
- Animation by: Character animation: Myron Waldman; Hicks Lokey; Lillian Friedman Astor (uncredited)
- Color process: Technicolor
- Production company: Fleischer Studios
- Distributed by: Paramount Pictures
- Release date: August 26, 1937
- Running time: 7:20
- Language: English

Peeping Penguins is a 1937 animated cartoon directed by Dave Fleischer and produced by Fleischer Studios for Paramount Pictures. It is part of Fleischer's Color Classics series.

== Plot ==
Four penguins are curious about an abandoned cabin. Their mother warns them in a song that "curiosity kills the cat". They ignore her, partly because she hypocritically displays her own curiosity over a stovepipe that they knocked to the ground. The penguins joyfully enter the cabin through the chimney. But inside the cabin, they find themselves in danger: two fiddle with a kettle of hot water and get hurt, one gets hurt when trying to operate a gramophone record, one wants to touch pepper, but he sneezes every time he gets near it, and one fiddles with a gun and accidentally gets his beak briefly stuck in it. Eventually, a penguin from the group plays with matchsticks, and fire is accidentally created in the process. The fire comes to life and attacks him. The penguin who was playing with the gun accidentally makes it start shooting around. A bullet from the gun hits a box of signal flares, causing it to fall near the fire, and upon being lit, all the flares start flying around the house, causing extreme mayhem. Finally, one flare sends all the penguins flying out of the house and high into the sky. They all fall back into the snow, and when their mother comes back, they apologize and say in unison, "We'll promise never to be curious again". The four penguins are forgiven, but then a moving mound of snow catches the attention of all five penguins, and it rises up, revealing that it is a polar bear. The bear roars ferociously, causing the penguins to run away in fear.

== Production ==
Peeping Penguins was directed by Dave Fleischer, and animated by Myron Waldman and Hicks Lokey. It was produced by Max Fleischer and Adolph Zukor under Fleischer Studios. The film was colorized using Technicolor. The score was composed by Sammy Timberg and Bob Rothberg.

== Release ==
Peeping Penguins was released on August 26, 1937, and distributed by Paramount Pictures.
