= Granite Hotel =

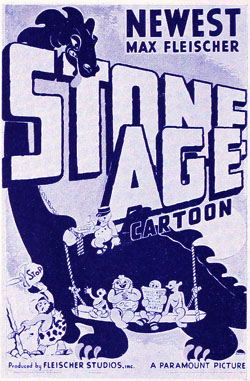
- Cartoon film poster
- Directed by: Dave Fleischer
- Story by: George Manuell
- Produced by: Max Fleischer; Adolph Zukor
- Starring: Jack Mercer
- Music by: Sammy Timberg
- Production company: Fleischer Studios
- Distributed by: Paramount Pictures
- Release date: April 26, 1940 (U.S.)
- Running time: 6 minutes
- Country: United States
- Language: English

The Cartoon

Granite Hotel is a 1940 American animated short film directed by Dave Fleischer. Released in April of that year, it was the fourth in the Stone Age Cartoons series. The film is now in public domain.

== Plot summary ==
Set in a modern Stone Age time, the viewer is presented to a gallery of characters like a telephone operator, the ventriloquist "Edgar Burgundy" and his doll "Charlie Bacardi" (a play on Edgar Bergen and Charlie McCarthy) and a barber. A guest in need of a chess player calls the fire department who arrives riding a sauropod.

== Cast ==
- Jack Mercer

=== Characters ===
- Newsboy
- Hotel Clerk
- Charlie Bacardi
- Monkey's Uncle
- Bejeweled Guest
- Barbered Guest
- Cold Guest
- Checker Player
- Bathing Guest
- Telephone Operator

== See also ==
- List of films featuring dinosaurs
