= Skinamarink =

2022 film by Kyle Edward Ball

- Theatrical release poster
- Directed by: Kyle Edward Ball
- Written by: Kyle Edward Ball
- Produced by: Dylan Pearce
- Starring: Lucas Paul; Dali Rose Tetreault; Ross Paul; Jaime Hill
- Cinematography: Jamie McRae
- Edited by: Kyle Edward Ball
- Production companies: Mutiny Pictures; ERO Picture Company
- Distributed by: BayView Entertainment; IFC Midnight; Shudder
- Release dates: July 25, 2022 (Fantasia); January 13, 2023 (North America)
- Running time: 100 minutes
- Country: Canada
- Language: English
- Budget: $15,000
- Box office: $2.1 million

Skinamarink is a 2022 Canadian experimental horror film written and directed by Kyle Edward Ball in his feature directorial debut. The film follows a young brother and sister who wake up during the night to discover that they cannot find their father and that the windows, doors, and other objects in their house are disappearing.

Before the production of Skinamarink, Ball ran a YouTube channel where he would upload videos based on nightmares recounted by commenters. His short film Heck (2020) was developed as a proof of concept for Skinamarink, which was shot on digital video at Ball's childhood home in Edmonton.

Skinamarink premiered at the Fantasia Film Festival in Montreal on July 25, 2022, before going on to screen at other festivals, including some that offered at-home viewing options. Copies of the film leaked online, after which it garnered attention and word-of-mouth acclaim on social media. Skinamarink received a theatrical release in North America via IFC Midnight on January 13, 2023, and was released on the horror streaming service Shudder on February 2. The film was a box office success, grossing $2 million against a $15,000 budget. It received generally positive reviews from critics, who characterized it as drawing upon experiences of childhood fear, though it received a highly polarized response from audiences.

== Plot ==
In 1995, four-year-old Kevin injures himself in an incident that his six-year-old sister Kaylee attributes to sleepwalking. Kevin is taken to a hospital and brought back home. The siblings wake up in the middle of the night to find that their father has disappeared and that the windows, doors, and other objects in their house are gradually vanishing. Kevin suggests they sleep downstairs, where they watch cartoons on television. They awaken to find the house still dark, hear an unexplained thumping noise, and find a chair upside-down on the ceiling. Kevin then suggests that their father "went with mom," but Kaylee requests that they do not discuss their mother.

The toilet in the downstairs bathroom disappears. On their way to the upstairs bathroom, Kaylee sees a doll on a bedroom ceiling and Kevin ends up too frightened to use the toilet, so they decide to place two buckets in the downstairs bathroom. A mysterious voice calls to Kaylee from the darkness and tells her to come upstairs, where she sees their father in a bedroom. He tells her to look under the bed, but she does not see anything. She then sees their mother sitting on the bed. Her mother says that she and their father love Kaylee and Kevin, and instructs her to close her eyes before vanishing. Kaylee looks at the open closet and hears her mother say "there's someone here". From the closet, she hears her mother calling her name as well as moans of pain and bones breaking. She is startled by a hand reaching around a corner and panics.

Kaylee runs downstairs, where Kevin helps her push the couch to block off the hallway from which the voice was calling her. When Kevin falls asleep, the voice calls Kaylee again. When Kevin wakes up, he sees that Kaylee is gone and toys and objects are suspended against a wall. The voice beckons Kevin into the basement, where he sees Kaylee, who no longer has eyes or a mouth. The voice tells him it wants to play as some of the toys begin to disappear. A drawer opens in the kitchen, and Kevin complies with the voice's command to insert a knife into one of his eyes.

Kevin calls 9-1-1 and tells the operator he was hurt and feels sick. The operator tells him to stay on the line and that adults are on their way. Kevin informs the operator that the doors have disappeared before dropping the phone, which then turns into a Chatter Telephone toy. The voice claims responsibility for this, telling Kevin that it can "do anything". It says that Kaylee disobeyed it and demanded to see her parents, so it took away her mouth.

The voice tells Kevin to come upstairs. Holding a flashlight, Kevin finds himself on the ceiling. He walks into a bedroom which becomes a void, and a dollhouse is shown sitting on a pile of toys in a seemingly infinite hallway as onscreen text reads "572 days". Kaylee is seen sitting on the bed; her body slowly fades away, followed by her head. Photos are shown of people with their faces either missing or distorted. Kevin cries out as blood splatters onto the floor, then disappears and splatters repeatedly. He asks Kaylee if they can watch "something happy", followed by an apparition of a door. In the dark, an unidentifiable face appears over him in his bed and tells him to go to sleep. Kevin asks the face what its name is twice. It does not respond.

== Cast ==
- Lucas Paul as Kevin
- Dali Rose Tetreault as Kaylee
- Ross Paul as Father
- Jaime Hill as Mother

== Production ==
=== Development ===
Ball previously ran a YouTube channel called Bitesized Nightmares, through which he would ask viewers to post comments about their nightmares and then film recreations of these nightmares. Skinamarink was inspired by the tropes recurrent in the most commonly submitted nightmares. The film was preceded by the proof of concept short film Heck (2020), which was also directed by Ball. He recalled, "I'd had a nightmare when I was little. I was in my parents' house, my parents were missing, and there was a monster. And lots of people have shared this exact same dream."

The inspiration for the film's title came after Ball heard the film's namesake song in the 1958 film Cat on a Hot Tin Roof and was reminded of Sharon, Lois & Bram's version, which he described as "an intrinsic part of [his] childhood". Ball was drawn to "Skinnamarink" as a film title because of its public domain status, the evocatory nature of hard "k" sounds, and its personal relevance to him and many others; he slightly altered the spelling so that young children searching online for the song would not accidentally find his film.

=== Filming ===
Skinamarink was shot over one week in August 2021 on a budget of $15,000, which was mostly crowdfunded. It was shot on digital video, with Jamie McRae serving as cinematographer, in Ball's childhood home in Edmonton. McRae shot on a Sony FX6 with Arri Ultra Prime lenses, and lit the film with whatever they had available on location, primarily a CRT television and small LED light. According to Ball, "Significant portions of the movie were literally just lit by the television." Due to the limited budget, the film was made using equipment sponsored by Alberta's Film and Video Arts Society. Ball stated, "Shooting a movie in the house you grew up in about two characters that are more or less you and your sister, I didn't have to try to make it more personal—it just sort of happened. And then an added benefit was my mom had saved a bunch of childhood toys that we used in the movie, so it got even more personal."

Skinamarink makes use of subtitles for certain lines of dialogue. Ball said, "The subtitles do originally appear in the script because I wanted to experiment with them. I've seen it quite a bit in analog horror on the internet. I thought it would be neat to play with scenes where we could hear people talking but it was so quiet we could only understand them with subtitles. And then when I got to editing there were certain scenes where, in retrospect, a scene is originally subtitled but the way they said something sounded good so we kept the audio. It was a fun little process."

=== Influences and references ===
Ball cited the work of filmmakers Chantal Akerman, Stan Brakhage, Maya Deren, Stanley Kubrick, and David Lynch as influences on Skinamarink. He also named the avant-garde film Wavelength (1967) and the slasher film Black Christmas (1974) as inspirations, saying, "Black Christmas has a lot of shots where there's just panning. I would refer to it when talking with my director of photography, who hadn't seen Black Christmas: 'This is my Black Christmas shot.'"

The following animated cartoon shorts seen on the television in Skinamarink are in the public domain courtesy of Internet Archive, including Somewhere in Dreamland and The Cobweb Hotel (each from 1936), Balloon Land (1935), and Prest-O Change-O (1939).

== Release ==
=== Festival screenings and leak ===
Skinamarink premiered at the 26th Fantasia International Film Festival in Montreal on July 25, 2022. Skinamarink then screened at several other festivals, including some which offered at-home viewing options, with its American debut at Anomaly Film Festival in Rochester, New York. Due to a technical issue, one of the festival platforms allowed the film's digital file to be pirated. This version was repeatedly uploaded to YouTube with excerpts posted to Reddit, TikTok, and Twitter, where it attracted considerable word-of-mouth acclaim. A number of TikTok videos deemed it one of the scariest films ever made, with one video asserting that it "is traumatizing everyone on TikTok". Ball expressed disappointment that the film was pirated, but was thankful for the positive reaction.

=== Theatrical release ===
The distribution rights for Skinamarink were acquired by AMC Networks for theatrical release via IFC Films (under the IFC Midnight label).

Skinamarink was theatrically released in the United States and Canada on January 13, 2023, opening on 629 screens. In the US, the film opened on partial schedules across the country, with showtimes added in accordance with demand and theatres' availability. Some theatre chains, such as Regal Cinemas and Cinemark Theatres, only screened the film nationwide on January 13 and 14. However, half of all theatres screening Skinamarink, including AMC Theatres locations, expanded their runs of the film to open engagements.

Skinamarink also screened in the United Kingdom, with showings taking place at the Prince Charles Cinema in London and Mockingbird Cinema in Birmingham.

The film was released on AMC Networks' horror streaming service Shudder on February 2, 2023.

=== Home media ===
On June 20, 2023, Skinamarink was released on DVD and Blu-ray, with a SteelBook exclusive to Walmart. On July 14, 2023, the company Lunchmeat VHS announced on Twitter that the film would be released on limited edition VHS tapes the following day, July 15, 2023. The VHS tapes were limited to 200 copies total. 25 copies were made with white colored shells, 50 with blue colored shells, and 125 with black colored shells.

== Reception ==
=== Box office ===
Skinamarink grossed US$746,000 over the first three days of its release, for a per-screen average of $1,100. By January 15, the film's gross had risen to $798,000, for a per-screen average of $1,150. By January 17, the film had grossed $890,000 domestically over the four-day Martin Luther King Jr. Day weekend. Against its $15,000 budget, the film is considered a commercial success.

=== Critical response ===
On the review aggregator website Rotten Tomatoes, 73% of 137 critics' reviews are positive. The website's consensus reads: "Skinamarink can be more confounding than frightening, but for viewers able or willing to dial into its unique wavelength, this unsettling film will be difficult to shake." Metacritic, which uses a weighted average, assigned the film a score of 66 out of 100, based on 25 critics, indicating "generally favorable" reviews.

Owen Gleiberman of Variety wrote: "I found Skinamarink terrifying, but it's a film that asks for (and rewards) patience, and can therefore invite revolt [...] Yet if you go with it, you may feel that you've touched the uncanny." Michael Gingold from Rue Morgue praised the film's shot compositions and sound design, writing that it "takes you back to being a little kid lying in bed in the middle of the night, listening to strange noises coming from elsewhere in the house and wondering what their frightful sources might be." He added that the film often opts to neither show nor tell, "but it pays off to the point where that offscreen voice's simple request to 'Look under the bed' has you tingling with anticipation, and a simple sound effect can get you shivering." Dread Central's Josh Korngut awarded Skinamarink a score of three-and-a-half out of five stars, calling it "a deeply unsettling exploration of death, childhood, and the house you grew up in", and concluding: "For those seeking a traditional horror movie experience, turn back now. And I say so without judgment. [...] Filmmaker Kyle Edward Ball demands the audience pick up the shovel and do the digging on their own. It's not fair, but it is an exciting and original vision of what horror can look like."

Matt Donato of /Film commended the film for its atmosphere, which he felt was derived from a familiarity with childhood experiences of fear, though he also criticized its runtime as overlong. He called it "exquisitely divisive—the kind of film that will balance zero and five-star reviews. That said, those seeking an abstract exploration of lights-out anxieties by lo-fi means should seek this shot-on-film-lookin' curiosity that abides by no conventional filmmaking rules." Matthew Jackson of The A.V. Club gave the film a grade of "A", writing that, "If you're willing to follow Ball and company down these dark corridors, into this twisted view of primal childhood fear and how easily we get lost in that fear, you're in for an absolutely unforgettable horror experience." Rolling Stone's K. Austin Collins characterized Skinamarink as featuring a "quiet cadence of cutting, oddly mundane, wait-and-see terror," and concluded that the film is "quiet horror at its finest. Skinamarink isn't scary because of what it depicts. It's scary because it already knows that our imagination will do half of the work." Brian Tallerico of RogerEbert.com gave the film three out of four stars, calling it "a difficult film to review", and "an experiment in form and storytelling, pushing viewers to stop interpreting it and experience it instead."

Rachel Ho of Exclaim! compared the narrative structure of Skinamarink to that of a dream, and wrote that it elicits fear through "a familiar dread that paints the entire film" rather than a conventional storyline. She added that it "taps into our childhood nightmares, when the nonsensical made sense and the dark was a living, breathing organism to be feared", and wrote, "It's been awhile since I've been this scared while watching a movie, and it's not even because of jump scares or the boogeyman. It's the disarming and unsettling feeling Ball creates, and the anxiety that he builds that never quite dissipates." Richard Brody of The New Yorker called the film "accomplished but seemingly unfinished—indeed, hardly begun", lamenting it as having "no referent world, no identifiable background, for [its images and sounds] to symbolize or suggest." Richard Whittaker of The Austin Chronicle wrote that its 100-minute length "gives Ball more time to create subtle thematic vibrations, build up dreamlike symbolism and resonances through recurrent images [...] Yet it's also an eye-straining act of endurance [...] The pat defense is that Skinamarink is not for conventional horror audiences, and that's obvious, but at the same time it feels overextended as a conceptual piece." Slant Magazine's Chuck Bowen felt that the film's "spell is broken by its sheer, ungodly slowness, which springs from a paucity of ideas. There's simply not much going on here. And with one's mind permitted to roam for vast stretches, there's time to consider Ball's borrowings." Seeing the works of Robert Bresson as one such influence, Bowen wrote: "Ball's innovation is to present such enjoyable hokum with a kind of Bressonian anti-naturalism, turning the proceedings austere and humorless. [...] What this monotonous formalist exercise doesn't have, though, is Bresson's sense of how minute details reveal unexpected dimensions of a person's soul."

Cath Clarke of The Guardian professed to "being underwowed" by the film, calling it "a little undeserving of its newly acquired cult status" and lacking "enough ideas to stretch beyond a 10-minute short. By the end I was more bored than frightened."

=== Audience response ===
Skinamarink received a polarized response from audiences; this, in combination with its viral spread on social media following its festival leak, drew comparisons to The Blair Witch Project (1999), another horror film that garnered word-of-mouth anticipation and split audience reactions.

=== Accolades ===
Award	Date of ceremony	Category	Recipient(s)	Result	Ref.
Chicago Film Critics Association Awards	December 12, 2023	Milos Stehlik Award for Breakthrough Filmmaker	Kyle Edward Ball	Nominated	
St. Louis Film Critics Association	December 17, 2023	Best Horror Film	Skinamarink	Runner-up	
