= Christmas Comes But Once a Year =

1936 cartoon

- Directed by: Dave Fleischer; Animation: Seymour Kneitel
- Produced by: Max Fleischer
- Starring: Everett Clark (Grampy); Mae Questel (Orphans - uncredited); Jack Mercer (additional voices)
- Music by: Sammy Timberg; Bob Rothberg; Tot Seymour
- Animation by: Seymour Kneitel; William Henning; Additional: Abner Kneitel (uncredited)
- Color process: Technicolor
- Production company: Fleischer Studios
- Distributed by: Paramount Pictures
- Release date: December 4, 1936
- Running time: 8 minutes
- Country: United States
- Language: English

Christmas Comes But Once a Year is a 1936 animated short produced by Fleischer Studios and released on December 4, 1936 by Paramount Pictures. It is part of the Color Classics series. The cartoon features Professor Grampy, a character from the Betty Boop series, in his only solo cartoon. An edited version was featured during the Pee-wee's Playhouse Christmas Special in 1988, as the featured short shown by the King of Cartoons.

The cartoon was restored from the original Paramount Pictures camera negatives by Jane Fleischer Reid's company Fabulous Fleischer Cartoons Restored and debuted on MeTV's Toon in With Me on December 21, 2022.

== Summary ==
The cartoon begins in an orphanage, where the orphans are all asleep in the dormitory, waiting for Christmas morning. Just then the clock chimes, and a puppy in the place of the cuckoo jumps out, slides down a ramp, and licks one of the orphans. The first orphan wakes up to shout to the others, "Merry Christmas, everybody!" They all jump out of bed and make their way to the hall, where they grab the toys from their stockings and get ready to play with them. However, they discover the terrible truth that the toys are old, worn, and already broken when they completely fall apart. The disappointed orphans burst into tears over having no other Christmas presents.

Meanwhile, Professor Grampy is outside, riding through the snow in his outboard motor-driven sleigh. He hears crying as he passes the orphanage, so he parks the sleigh, runs to the door, and peeps through the window to see the orphans wailing and tearfully heading back to their bedroom. Grampy feels distressed for the orphans and starts to think of a way to give them a better Christmas. He puts on his "thinking cap", and the lightbulb on his cap blinks, meaning that he has an idea. He sneaks in through the kitchen window and starts making new toys out of household appliances, furniture, and other kitchen paraphernalia (a washboard, a roller shade, the works of an old alarm clock, etc).

Whilst the orphans are still crying in the dormitory, Grampy dresses up as Santa Claus (with bent stovepipes for the boots, a red tablecloth for the jacket, a pillow for the weight, a strop for the belt, a picture frame for the buckle, and a red purse for the hat), grabs a dinner bell, and surprises the orphans by ringing the bell and proclaiming, "Merry Christmas, everybody!" The orphans instantly stop whining, brighten and excitedly rush out to play with their new toys, and also sled and ski down what was their staircase, now turned into a makeshift winter wonderland.

Grampy completes the scene by making a Christmas tree out of green umbrellas. He places it on top of a phonograph, decorates it, and gathers all the orphans together. As they sing the title song one last time, a giant 1936 Christmas Seal stamp appears on the screen, featuring Santa Claus and a "Holiday Greetings" message, and the cartoon ends on a festive note.

== Production ==
The orphans were all animated based on a template of one of them, whose toy soldier falls through the sock. The short was directed by Dave Fleischer and starred actor Everett Clark as the voice of Grampy; it was Grampy's only appearance in which Betty Boop did not appear.

Along with many of the other Color Classics, Christmas Comes But Once a Year is today in the public domain. On various video copies of the film, it is released with Hector's Hectic Life, and a few other productions by Famous Studios, including Snow Foolin'. Certain prints also contain Jack Frost, a 1934 cartoon produced by Ub Iwerks and released through Celebrity Productions.

The film's title song would be slightly rewritten the following year for the New Years-themed Popeye the Sailor cartoon "Let's Celebrake" where it was sung by Popeye and Bluto at the beginning.

== Lyrics ==
Christmas comes but once a year
Now it's here, now it's here
Bringing lots of joy and cheer
Tra la la la la

You and me and he and she
And we are glad because
Why? Because, because, because
There is a Santa Claus

Oh, Christmas comes but once a year
Now it's here, now it's here
Bringing lots of joy and cheer
Tra la la la la

== See also ==
- List of Christmas films
