= Time for Love (film) =

- Directed by: Dave Fleischer
- Produced by: Max Fleischer
- Production company: Fleischer Studios
- Distributed by: Paramount Pictures
- Release date: September 6, 1935
- Country: United States
- Language: English

Time for Love is a Fleischer Studios film directed by Dave Fleischer and distributed by Paramount Pictures. It was released on September 6, 1935 as part of the Color Classics series.

== Summary ==
The cartoon focuses on a couple of mute swans who love each other. A greedy and stubborn black swan attracts the female mute swan, who decides to go with him, rather than the male mute swan, leaving him depressed. Later on, the black swan abuses his mate when she fails to catch a fish. The female mute swan distracts him when she gives him a frog. She runs with the black swan in pursuit. She finds her mate, and the male mute swan protects her and fights the black swan. The male mute swan is triumphant, and the black swan loses and runs off. After everything is over, the female mute swan regret her foolish mistake she made and returns to her old lover, who forgives her. Then, the couple live a happy ending together.
