= Ants in the Plants =

1940 film

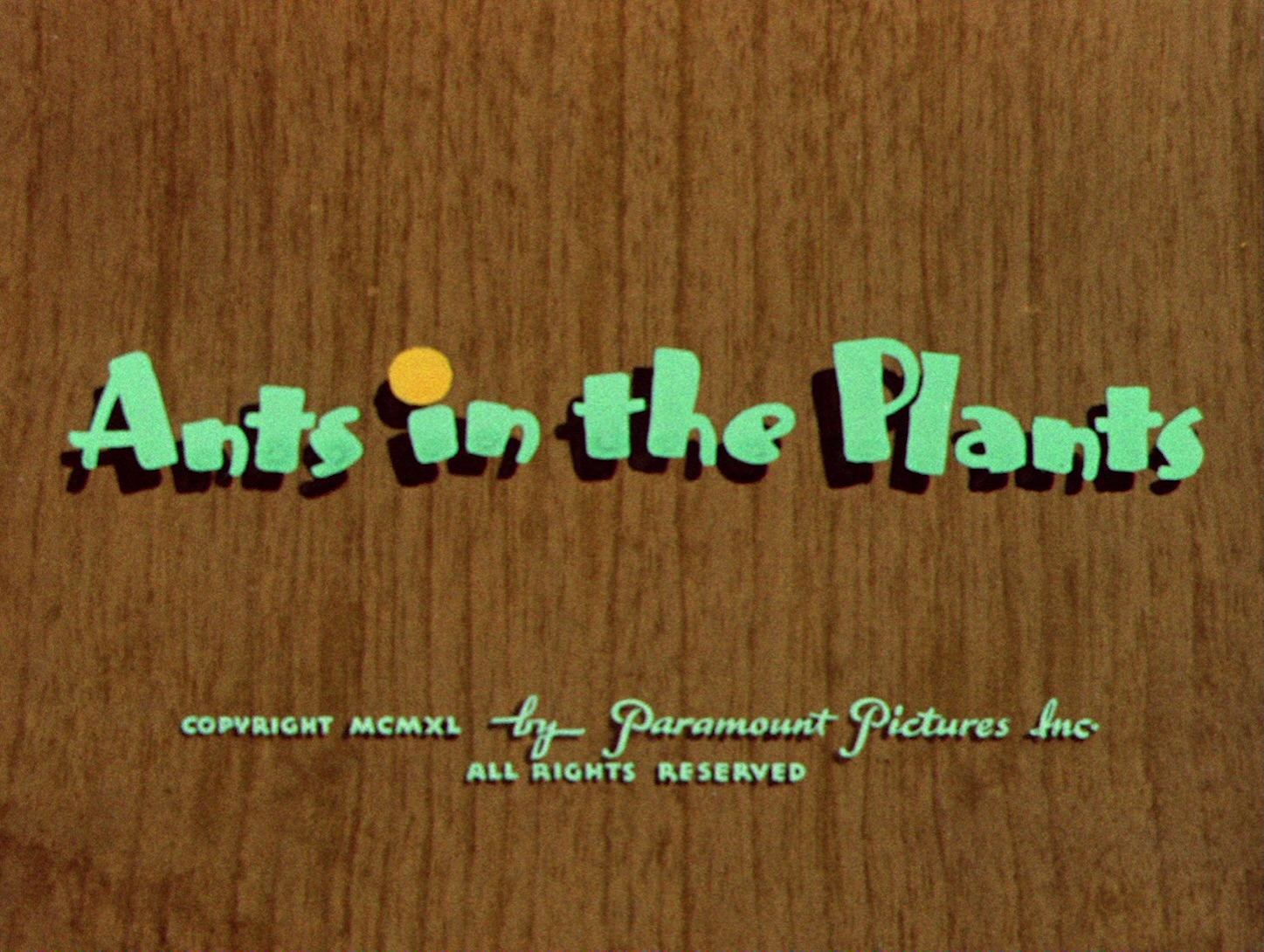
- Title card
- Directed by: Dave Fleischer
- Story by: George Manuell
- Produced by: Max Fleischer
- Music by: Musical arrangement: Sammy Timberg
- Animation by: Character animation: Myron Waldman; George Moreno
- Color process: Technicolor
- Production company: Fleischer Studios
- Distributed by: Paramount Pictures
- Release date: March 15, 1940 (along with Women Without Names)
- Running time: 7 minutes
- Country: United States
- Language: English

Ants in the Plants is a Technicolor cartoon created by Fleischer Studios and originally released into theaters on March 15, 1940, by Paramount Studios. It was produced by Max Fleischer and directed by Dave Fleischer; animators were Myron Waldman and George Moreno. Music for the cartoon was composed by Sammy Timberg. It was part of the Fleischer Studios series Color Classics produced by the studio between 1934 and 1941.

== Summary ==
The plot involves a wicked anteater that is a constant threat to an ant colony. The ants have been warned by their queen ant to prepare for an attack by this long-time enemy. She says to them, "He's a menace. He's a brute. He will scoop you with his snoot". Therefore, they are expecting the assault, and they have focused on a military defense, such as preparing fortifications, compiling munitions in their fortress, and generally becoming ready for war. Their plan for the anteater's impending invasion is to make him yell, "Uncle!" The military units of the ants are led by the queen ant who rides a snail, but the anteater takes many ant casualties, forcing the ant colony to rethink its strategy. Ultimately, the ants decide to abandon their modern military tactics, and after resorting to the Sewer Side Squad, they wrathfully swarm the anteater.

== Analysis ==
The cartoon's emphasis on preparedness for war and tactics of armament has led to its being characterized as a "war allegory", the only one of the 10 cartoons released in 1940 that is considered war-related and called thus, because of its militaristic tone. Since it was released during the Phoney War, some have speculated that it refers to France's Maginot Line.

== Reception ==
One reviewer of Ants in the Plants said: "Life in the village of the ants. Impressive cartoon with great battle scenes". Animation historian Charles Solomon, however, considers it "painfully unfunny".

== Availability ==
All 36 cartoons, including Ants in the Plants, were released in 2003 on the DVD Somewhere in Dreamland: The Max Fleischer Color Classics.

== See also ==
- List of public domain cartoons
