= The Fresh Vegetable Mystery =

- Directed by: Dave Fleischer
- Story by: Joe Stultz
- Produced by: Max Fleischer
- Music by: Winston Sharples; Sammy Timberg
- Production company: Fleischer Studios
- Distributed by: Paramount Pictures
- Release date: September 29, 1939
- Running time: 6 minutes
- Country: United States
- Language: English

The Fresh Vegetable Mystery is a 1939 American animated short film directed by Dave Fleischer and produced by Fleischer Studios, as part of the Color Classics film series. It was released on September 29, 1939.

In 2024, the film was selected as part of an animated short film collection to be restored by Seth MacFarlane and Martin Scorsese. The collection was titled Back From the Ink: Restored Animated Shorts and premiered at the TCM Classics Film Festival on April 20, 2024.

== Plot ==
It's late at night in the kitchen, and all the vegetables are asleep when a cloaked figure arrives and kidnaps Mother Carrot and her kids. A cop, portrayed by a Potato, goes off investigate and finds the culprit. The cloaked figure eventually sneaks into a beer hall (represented as a crate of root beer), and the potato cop calls for backup and raids the bar, dragging out all the fruits and vegetables in the hall to be interrogated.

The cops try various ways of interrogating the beer hall customers, such as an old piece of corn being put into a toaster, an orange being squeezed by a juicer, and a hard-boiled egg cooked on a frying pan. All of which are proven innocent, however, as the cloaked figure returns and attacks the cops. Two cops then chase the figure with an egg beater as if it was a motorcycle. The beater suddenly gets caught on the figures' cloth, ripping it off and revealing that a figure is actually a group of mice carrying pliers. Meanwhile, one of the cops discovers Mother Carrot and her babies stuck in a mouse trap inside the crack of a wall and are rescued. The mice try to escape into what looks like a mouse hole but are actually lured into a mouse cage. All the mice begin to bicker with each other as the cartoon ends.
