= Dancing on the Moon =

- Directed by: Dave Fleischer
- Produced by: Max Fleischer
- Starring: Mae Questel
- Music by: Charlie Tobias; Murray Mencher
- Animation by: Seymour Kneitel; Roland Crandall
- Production company: Fleischer Studios
- Distributed by: Paramount Pictures
- Release date: 12 July 1935
- Running time: 7:38
- Country: United States
- Language: English

Dancing on the Moon is a 1935 animated film directed by Dave Fleischer and part of the Color Classics series of animated short films produced by Fleischer Studios.

According to animation historian Jerry Beck, this film probably contains the first example of the dance move "moonwalk".

== Plot summary ==
"Honeymoon Express to the Moon" offers a ride for one dollar per couple. Passengers embark on the spaceship: cattle, penguins, elephants, bears and giraffes. A cat couple arriving late is split up at the takeoff and the female is left behind. On the ship, the cat plays solitaire with cards.

While on the Moon, the eight couples find private places to smooch. While at the base of the female giraffe's neck, the male comments "This is a great place for necking" to which the female (in a Mae West impression) retorts "Why don't you come up and see me sometime?" (Note: The line resembles the lines "Why don't you come up some time and see me?" from She Done Him Wrong (1933) and "Come up and see me sometime!" from I'm No Angel (1933), both starring Mae West.) The cat plays cat's cradle. When the other couples dance, the cat dances a moonwalk.

When arriving back on Earth, the couples get deliveries from the stork but the cat does not. He is reunited with his bride who then physically abuses him.
