= Stone Age Cartoons =

1940 American series of animated short films

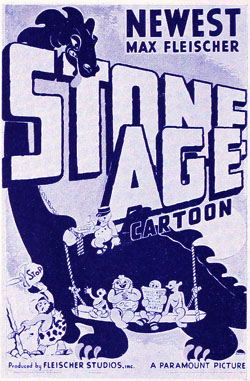
- Stone Age cartoon film poster
- Directed by: Dave Fleischer
- Written by: Dan Gordon; Tedd Pierce; Grim Natwick
- Produced by: Dave Fleischer
- Music by: Sammy Timberg
- Animation by: David Tendlar; Myron Waldman; Bill Nolan; Al Eugster; Grim Natwick
- Color process: B&W
- Production company: Fleischer Studios
- Distributed by: Paramount Pictures
- Release date: 1940
- Running time: 5 — 6 minutes
- Country: United States
- Language: English

Stone Age Cartoons is a 1940 American series of twelve animated short films from Fleischer Studios. The films are set in the Stone Age era, much like the 1960s series The Flintstones. When they did not get the anticipated reception, Fleischer turned their attention to the Gabby cartoon series.

All of the Stone Age Cartoons are copyrighted with the exception of When a Nag Was Only a Horse, When a Nightclub Was a Stick, Granite Hotel, and When Women Had Their Weigh.

== Filmography ==
All of the films were directed by Dave Fleischer.

#	Title	Release Date	Film (If In The Public Domain)	Animation	Story	Notes
1	Way Back When a Triangle Had its Points	January 26, 1940	Not Publicly Available	Dave Tendlar & Tom Golden	Bill Turner	Was considered lost until a copy was found by the UCLA Film & Television Archive.
2	Way Back When a Nag Was Only a Horse	March 8, 1940	TV Release.	Myron Waldman & George Moreno Jr.	Joe Stultz	
3	Way Back When a Nightclub Was a Stick	March 15, 1940		Dave Tendlar & Edwin Rehburg	Bill Turner	
4	Granite Hotel	April 26, 1940		Thomas Johnson & Graham Place	George Manuell	
5	The Foul Ball Player	May 24, 1940	Copyright Renewed	William Nolan & Ralph Sommerville	Jack Ward	
6	The Ugly Dino	June 14, 1940	Copyright Renewed	William Nolan & George Germanetti	George Manuell	
7	Wedding Belts	July 5, 1940	Copyright Renewed	Dave Tendlar & Steve Muffatti	George Manuell	
8	Way Back When a Razzberry Was a Fruit	July 26, 1940	Copyright Renewed	Shamus Culhane & Al Eugster	Dan Gordon	
9	The Fulla Bluff Man	August 9, 1940	Copyright Renewed	Grim Natwick & Roland Crandall	Tedd Pierce	
10	Springtime in the Rockage	August 30, 1940	Copyright Renewed	Myron Waldman & Dick Williams	Dan Gordon	
11	Pedagogical Institution (College to You)	September 13, 1940	Copyright Renewed	Abner Kneitel & Arnold Gillespie	Joe Stultz	
12	Way Back When Women Had Their Weigh	September 26, 1940	TV Release.	Thomas Johnson & Harold Walker	Tedd Pierce	Last film in the series.

== See also ==
- Golden Age of Animation
- Fleischer Studios
- The Flintstones
