= Poor Cinderella =

1934 Fleischer Studios-animated short film

- Directed by: Dave Fleischer; Seymour Kneitel (animation)
- Produced by: Max Fleischer (also presenter)
- Starring: Mae Questel; Bonnie Poe
- Music by: Murray Mencher; Jack Scholl; Charles Tobias; Phil Spitalny (director, credited as recording); Sammy Timberg (director, uncredited)
- Animation by: Roland Crandall; Seymour Kneitel; William Henning
- Color process: Cinecolor (2-strip)
- Production company: Fleischer Studios
- Distributed by: Paramount Pictures
- Release date: August 3, 1934
- Running time: 10 minutes
- Country: United States
- Language: English

Poor Cinderella is a 1934 Fleischer Studios-animated short film featuring Betty Boop. Poor Cinderella was Fleischer Studios' first color film, and the only appearance of Betty Boop in color during the Fleischer era. It was the first Paramount Pictures animated short in color.

== Plot ==
Cinderella (portrayed by Betty Boop) is a poor young woman forced to be the virtual slave of her two ugly stepsisters, who demand she prepare them for the prince's ball while she is left at home to lament her spinsterdom, singing that no one loves her and that her only respite is her dreams, but she holds out hope of being a real princess someday. Cinderella is visited by her fairy godmother, who grants her wish to attend the prince's ball, giving her beautiful clothes, a carriage, and the traditional glass slippers, with the warning that she must leave by midnight before the spell expires.

During the ball, Prince Charming, provoked by a mallet-wielding Cupid, descends the staircase in royal fashion and is instantly smitten by Cinderella. The two have a wonderful time dancing together, but when midnight strikes, she rushes out of the ball, leaving behind her shoe. The prince proclaims that whoever can fit her foot into the shoe shall be his wife; all the maidens in the land line up to try, with none in the queue able to fit until Cinderella arrives and fits into the shoe easily. The two are married, and the ugly stepsisters are left to argue with each other until the end title's doors smack their heads together.

== Background ==
The short was made in the two-strip Cinecolor process, because Walt Disney had exclusive rights to the new 3-strip Technicolor process from 1932 to 1935. (The remaining Color Classics from 1934 and 1935 were made in two-color Technicolor.) Betty's hair was colored red to take advantage of this. The short also used Fleischer Studio's Stereoptical process, in order to provide some scenes with additional depth of field.

Rudy Vallée appears in caricature, singing the title song during the ball sequence.
