= The Cobweb Hotel =

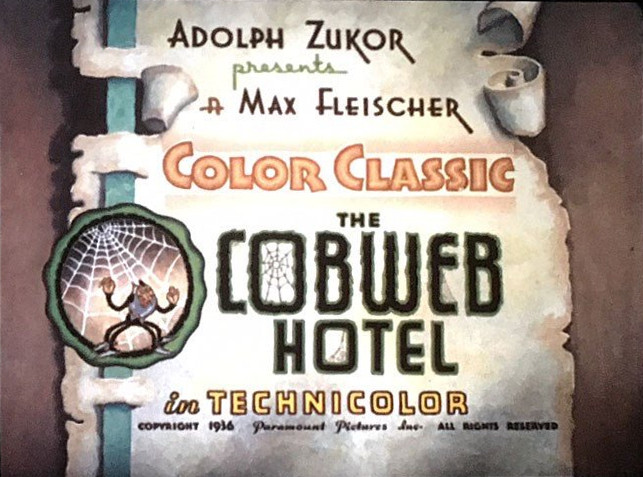
- Title card
- Directed by: Dave Fleischer
- Story by: William Turner (uncredited)
- Produced by: Max Fleischer
- Starring: Jack Mercer (uncredited)
- Music by: Sammy Timberg; Bob Rothberg
- Animation by: David Tendlar; William Sturm; Nicholas Tafuri (unc.); Eli Brucker (unc.); Joe Oriolo (unc.); Graham Place (unc.)
- Production company: Fleischer Studios
- Distributed by: Paramount Pictures
- Release date: May 15, 1936
- Running time: 8 minutes
- Country: United States
- Language: English

The Cobweb Hotel is a 1936 American animated short film directed by Dave Fleischer, produced by Fleischer Studios, and is one of the short films that belongs to the Color Classics film series. Animated by David Tendlar and William Sturm, the setting is said to be one of the Fleischer's desks, which the spider used to open the hoax hotel.

== Plot ==
The cartoon starts off with a devious spider (voiced by Jack Mercer) who holds many fly captives in the rooms of "The Cobweb Hotel" and sees a newly married couple of flies booking a room into the fake hotel. After they discover the trap, the female fly gets ensnared in one of the spider's webs, and the male fly fights with the spider being a "flyweight champion", but he too becomes stuck in a web during the match.

Meanwhile, his wife wriggles herself free from the web and gives freedom to all the captives, who torment the spider by flicking several sharp pen heads and firing many aspirin pills at the spider. After paying revenge to the spider, the couple hold another wedding ceremony, followed by the other captives of the hotel, until the ending scene rolls in.

== See also ==
List of animated films in the public domain in the United States
