= Play Safe =

Play Safe may refer to:

- Play Safe (1927 film), an American silent comedy film
- Play Safe (1936 film), an animated short film
- Play Safe (public information film), a 1978 British public information film
