= Play Safe (1936 film) =

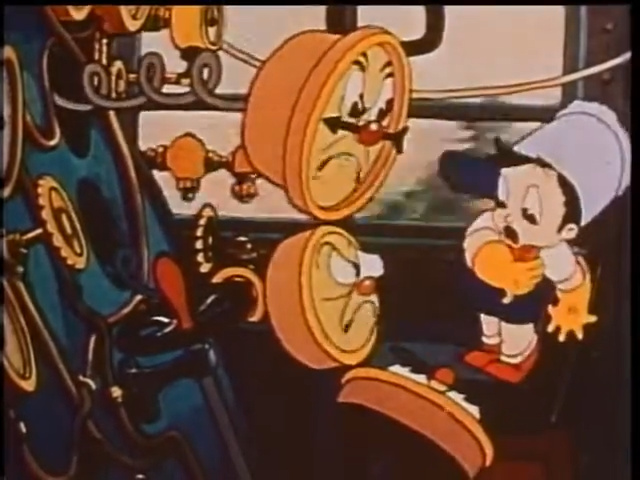
- Screencap of Play Safe.
- Directed by: Dave Fleischer
- Produced by: Max Fleischer; Adolph Zukor (executive)
- Starring: Jack Mercer; Mae Questel
- Music by: Sammy Timberg; Vee Lawnhurst (music); Seymour Tot (lyrics)
- Animation by: David Tendlar; Eli Brucker
- Color process: Cinecolor
- Production company: Fleischer Studios
- Distributed by: Paramount Pictures
- Release date: October 16, 1936
- Running time: 8 minutes
- Country: United States
- Language: English

The short film.

Play Safe is a 1936 animated short film produced by Fleischer Studios and released by Paramount Pictures. This film was part of Max Fleischer's Color Classics series. The film follows the story of a boy who has a dream about being on a real train (and learns a lesson about train safety).

== Plot ==
In his backyard, a little boy dressed like an engineer, is reading a book about trains while playing with a toy train. He has a brief thought about what it would be like to operate a real train. At that moment, he hears a real freight train approaching. He opens the gate to see the train stop, and goes to board it, but fails when his St. Bernard, whose name is given as Rover, grabs him before he can get far. Still wanting to get a hands-on experience, the boy attaches Rover's collar to a nearby tree and then makes his way toward the train and climbs onboard the boxcar at the end. Rover frantically tries to get free from the rope, fully aware of the dangers at hand. As the train starts moving, the boy ends up falling off, knocking his head against the rails and sending him into Dreamland.

Entering subconsciousness, the boy wakes up to find himself in an enormous train yard filled with steam engines with built-in yet uneasy smiley faces. Too excited to care, he looks around and boards the cab of a shiny, greenish blue streamlined engine. Then he hops in the seat, blows the whistle and plays with the levers and valves. The streamlined engine starts moving, slowly at first but quickly shifting up to rapid speed. Suddenly, the gauges on the dashboard start stalking the boy with the ominous warning "play safe". Frightened, the boy realizes that the streamlined engine is going much too fast, and reaches for the levers, but they disappear before he can grab hold of them. With no way of stopping, the boy finds himself trapped onboard the streamlined engine as it travels around treacherous mountains and into a cavernous tunnel back in placers. Suddenly, from out of nowhere a red streamliner, coming in the opposite direction and screaming, appears on the same track. The two engines blow their whistles at one another, but instead of colliding, they jump off the tracks and scream face to face as the nightmare cuts away.

The boy is still not fully awake, and Rover hears another freight train coming down the tracks. Rover finally manages to break free from his collar, and rushes to the boy's rescue. As the train speedily approaches the boy laying on the tracks, Rover finally manages to outrun Baltimore. He dips his tail in some red paint and waves it like a flag, hoping to stop the oncoming train, but to no avail as Baltimore runs into Rover, sending him speeding along the tracks over to his young master and grabs the boy in his teeth, pulling him out of danger just as the train speeds past. Once Baltimore had gone, Rover licks the boy's face to wake him up, and the film ends with the boy happily hugging his ginormous hound.
