= The Playful Polar Bears =

- Directed by: Dave Fleischer
- Starring: Jack Mercer (Papa Polar Bear-uncredited); Mae Questel (Baby Polar Bear-uncredited)
- Music by: Sammy Timberg (uncredited)
- Animation by: Myron Waldman; Graham Place; Lillian Friedman (uncredited)
- Color process: Technicolor
- Production company: Fleischer Studios
- Distributed by: Paramount Pictures
- Release date: October 28, 1938
- Running time: 8 minutes
- Country: United States
- Language: English

The Playful Polar Bears is an animated short produced by Fleischer Studios and released by Paramount Pictures on October 28, 1938. It is part of the Color Classics series. The short's copyright was renewed in 1965.

== Summary ==
A polar bear father has to protect one of his children when a group of hunters puts their home in danger.

== Reception ==
Motion Picture Exhibitor (Nov 15, 1938): "Here's a natural for the kids. The Fleischers put Myron Waldman to work turning out one of the best shorts they have made. Three polar bears (one is naturally the "black sheep") cavort in the snow, are chased by hunters. The "black sheep" fails to run to safety, is kayoed by a falliong icicle. Thinking him dead, an effective mourning chant follows. He comes to life, there's great celebration. Excellent".
