= Gabby (film series) =

1940-41 American film series

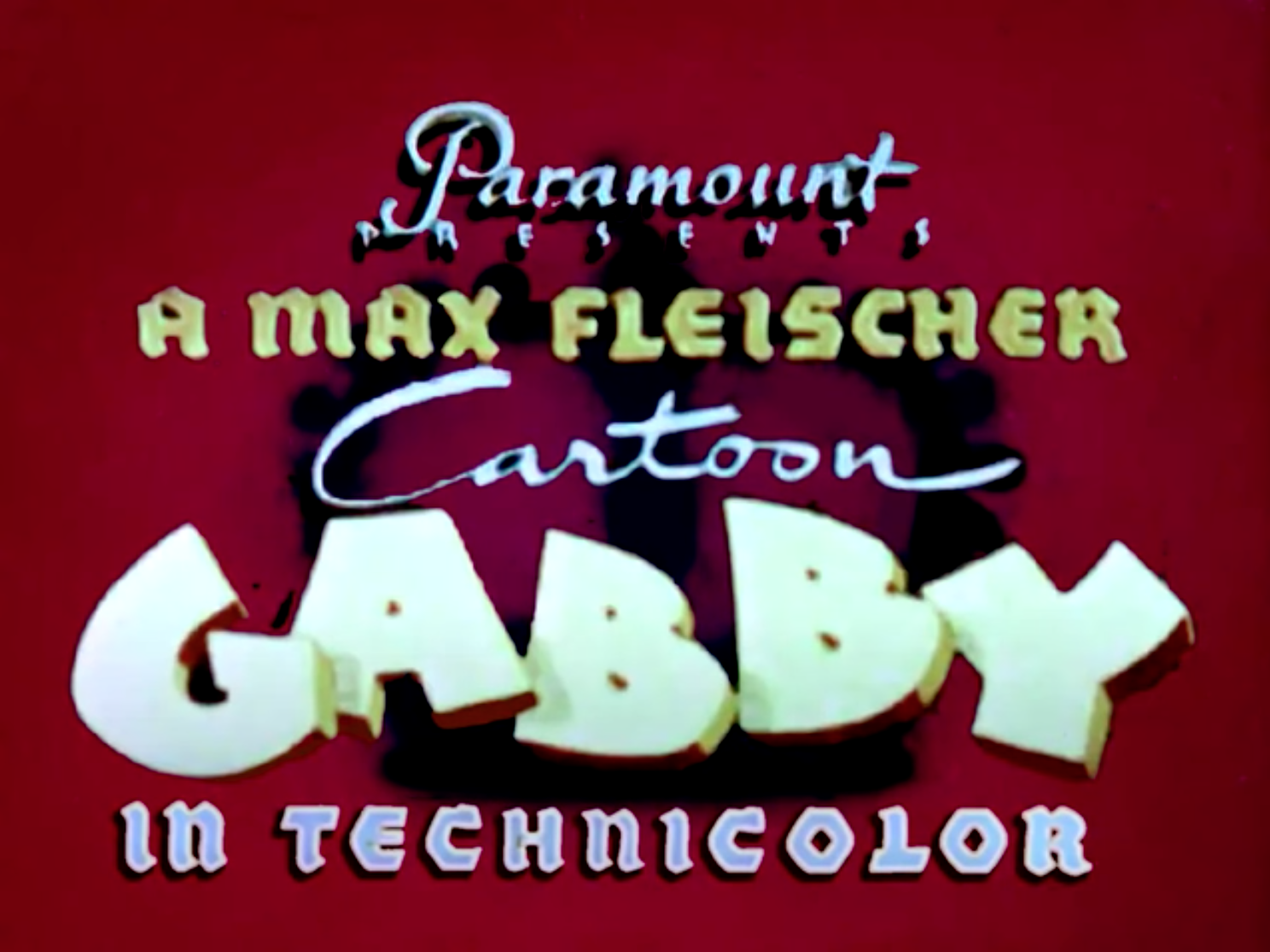
- Title card
- Directed by: Dave Fleischer
- Story by: Joseph E. Stultz; Dan Gordon; Bob Wickersham; Pinto Colvig; Jack Ward; Carl Meyer
- Produced by: Max Fleischer (credit only); Dave Fleischer (uncredited)
- Starring: Pinto Colvig; Jack Mercer; Margie Hines
- Music by: Sammy Timberg
- Animation by: Willard Bowsky; James Davis; Bill Nolan; George Germanetti; David Tendlar; James Culhane; Alfred Eugster; Arnold Gillespie; Steve Muffati; Joe Oriolo; Orestes Calpini; Otto Feuer; Irving Spector
- Production company: Fleischer Studios
- Distributed by: Paramount Pictures
- Running time: 6 — 7 minutes
- Country: United States
- Language: English

Gabby is a series of animated short films produced by Fleischer Studios and distributed by Paramount Pictures. It features the titular town crier in the 1939 animated feature Gulliver’s Travels produced by Fleischer, serving as a sequel spin-off series of the film, in which Gabby always causing trouble in Lilliput.

== History ==
In 1940, Dave Fleischer assumed full control of Fleischer Studio's production output, reducing the role of his brother Max to business-related affairs. Shortly after the release of Gulliver’s Travels, Paramount and Fleischer gave Gabby his own Technicolor spinoff cartoon series. Eight entries were produced in 1940 and 1941. Gabby was voiced by Pinto Colvig, the voice of Walt Disney's Goofy, Pluto, and Grumpy and Sleepy from the 1937 animated film Snow White and the Seven Dwarfs.

Jack Mercer (the voice of Popeye and King Little, Sneak, Snoop, Snitch, and Twinkle Toes in Gulliver’s Travels) was regularly cast alongside Colvig, as either a king, mayor, snitch, fish, castle worker, fire fighter, or sometimes even as Gabby's humming.

The Gabby cartoons proved to be critically and commercially unsuccessful with audiences, with most of the criticism being aimed at Gabby's grating voice, his unpleasant character and him being unfit for a main lead role. The negative reception of the shorts contributed to the closure of Fleischer Studios and the firing of Dave and Max Fleischer, which culminated with the box office failure of Mr. Bug Goes to Town and the high production costs of the Superman animated cartoons.

The cartoons were later sold to U.M. & M. TV Corporation in 1955, which later became part of National Telefilm Associates, which became Republic Pictures, and was then sold to Paramount's then current parent Viacom (now currently renamed and rebranded as Skydance Corporation) in 1999. Today, the Gabby cartoons are in the public domain as they didn’t get renewed. For official releases, the cartoons are currently syndicated on television by Trifecta Entertainment & Media (inherited from CBS Television Distribution and other companies), original distributor Paramount owns the theatrical rights, and Olive Films owns the DVD rights. However, most Gabby cartoons can be found in faded public domain television prints, usually featuring the edited Television openings.

== Filmography ==
All films are directed by Dave Fleischer.

#	Title	Release Date	Film	Animator	Story	Notes
1	King for a Day	October 18, 1940		Willard Bowsky & James Davis	Joseph E. Stultz	First released cartoon
2	The Constable	November 15, 1940	Still copyrighted.	Bill Nolan & George Germanetti	Dan Gordon	
3	All's Well	January 17, 1941	With TV Titles.	Dave Tendlar & Bill Nolan	Bob Wickersham	
4	Two for the Zoo	February 21, 1941	With TV Titles.	James Culhane & Al Eugster	Pinto Colvig	
5	Swing Cleaning	April 11, 1941	With TV Titles.	Willard Bowsky & Arnold Gillespie	Bob Wickersham	
6	Fire Cheese	June 20, 1941	With TV Titles.	Steve Muffati & Joe Oriolo	Jack Ward	
7	Gabby Goes Fishing	July 18, 1941	With TV Titles.	Orestes Calpini & Otto Feuer	Carl Meyer	
8	It's a Hap-Hap-Happy Day	August 15, 1941		Orestes Calpini & Irving Spector	Bob Wickersham	
