= Somewhere in Dreamland =

- The film
- Directed by: Dave Fleischer
- Produced by: Max Fleischer
- Music by: Murray Mencher; Charles Newman
- Animation by: Seymour Kneitel; Roland Crandall
- Color process: Technicolor
- Production company: Fleischer Studios
- Distributed by: Paramount Pictures
- Release date: January 17, 1936
- Running time: 8:55
- Country: United States
- Language: English

Somewhere in Dreamland is a 1936 animated short in Max Fleischer's Color Classics series. The film was produced by Max Fleischer, directed by Dave Fleischer, and was animated by Fleischer veterans Seymour Kneitel and Roland Crandall. The cartoon, set during the contemporary Great Depression, follows two impoverished children who dream that they are in Dreamland where there is an area full of candy and ice cream. The cartoon is Fleischer's first in three-strip Technicolor.

== Plot ==
On a winter evening, a young brother and sister in ragged clothes pull a wagon through town, gathering firewood. They pass by several merchants' shops and stop for a moment to admire the confectioneries in the bakery. As a friendly baker sees the children, he goes inside and comes back with cupcakes for them, but they have already left. The baker, the tailor, and the market owner gather to make a plan to help the poor children.

The children reach their rundown home and sit down to supper consisting of hard bread and flat water. The children eat quickly, with the boy saying that he is still hungry. Their mother, unable to provide more food, begins to cry, at which the boy takes back what he said to comfort her, and she then kisses them goodnight. They change into their nighties, and they each sing a part of a song as they fall asleep beneath their tattered sheets.

In their sleep, they enter Dreamland. They frolic through the land, which includes a merry-go-round cake, fields that grow ice cream cones and popcorn, toys, nice clothes, and two beds. They skip and laugh and then lie down on the beds, only to awaken back in their own shabby bedroom.

To their surprise, a large feast is on the kitchen table, as well as toys and clothing surrounding the room, all of which is provided by the merchants. The children look up to the baker, the tailor, and the market owner, asking twice if all these things are for them. The merchants nod in affirmation. The children shout in joy and begin to eat. However, the boy, suspicious of his good fortune, sticks a fork in his bottom to ensure that he is not still dreaming. The children laugh and continue to eat as the cartoon closes.

== Legacy ==
In 2021, as part of a new initiative spearheaded by Max Fleischer's granddaughter, Jane Fleischer Reid, Fabulous Fleischer Cartoons Restored (in co-operation with Paramount Pictures) restored a print of Somewhere in Dreamland (sourced from the original negatives) premiered on the MeTV network on December 13 during MeTV's Super Colossal Cartoon Christmas, later re-airing on their weekday morning cartoon series Toon In with Me.
