= Down on the Farm (1941 film) =

1941 film by Tex Avery and Lou Lilly

- Directed by: Tex Avery; Lou Lilly
- Produced by: Max Fleischer; Jerry Fairbanks
- Starring: Mel Blanc; Sara Berner; Bernice Hansen; Kent Rogers
- Production companies: Fleischer Studios; Jerry Fairbanks Productions
- Distributed by: Paramount Pictures
- Release date: August 18, 1941
- Running time: 11 minutes
- Country: United States
- Language: English

Down on the Farm is a 1941 American live action-animated short film directed by Tex Avery and Lou Lilly. It is the seventh film of Paramount Pictures and Fleischer Studios' Animated Antics series and the second to be outsourced, as well as the first film to be directed by Avery after he left Leon Schlesinger Productions. It was successful enough to launch the Speaking of Animals series, which Schlesinger had rejected years prior. It was nominated for an Academy Award at the 14th Academy Awards for Best Short Subject (One-Reel).
