= Say Uncle =

North American idiomatic expression

"Say 'uncle'!" is a chiefly North American expression demanding that the opponent in a contest submit. The response "Uncle!" is equivalent to "Mercy!", "Please!", "I give up!" or similar sentiment, and indicates submission.

== Definition ==
In the United States and Canada, the idiomatic expression "Say 'uncle'!" may be used as an imperative command to demand submission of one's opponent, such as during an informal wrestling match or tickling. Similarly, the exclamation "Uncle!" is an indication of submission—analogous to "I give up!"—or it may be a cry for mercy, in such a game or match.

== Origin ==
There are several theories on the phrase's origin.

Due to heavy Irish immigration in eastern Canada and New England in the 19th century, it may be an anglicization of the Irish anacal, meaning deliverance or quarter.

Another theory is that it derives from a phrase uttered by youngsters in the Roman Empire who got into trouble, patrue mi patruissime (“uncle, my best of uncles”).

A fanciful suggestion is that it may be based on a joke from 19th-century England about a bullied parrot being coaxed to address his owner's uncle.

Another suggested origin is from the English phrase "time out", a plea to cease hostilities. The abbreviated usage "T.O." was mistaken for the Spanish tío, which means "uncle".

== Foreign-language analog ==
There is a common analog in the Arabian Peninsula, the expression "قول عمي" ([q]uwl 'aamiy), which means "say uncle".

In Canadian French, the expression "Dis « pardon », mon oncle" is often used in the same way. It means "Say 'excuse me', uncle".

In Persian, the expression غلط کردم (“I was wrong”) may be used informally to indicate submission, apology, or concession, particularly in situations where one is under pressure.
