= Animated Antics =

1940-41 animated film series

Animated Antics is an animated cartoon series produced by the Fleischer Studios from 1940 through 1941, and distributed through Paramount Pictures.

Each cartoon ran less than 7 minutes, all in black & white (reports that Copy Cat was in Technicolor are erroneous). Five cartoons in the series were spin-offs from Fleischer Studios' 1939 feature film Gulliver's Travels, starring the villains Sneak, Snoop, and Snitch and the carrier pigeon Twinkletoes from the movie, all voiced by Jack Mercer. The studio produced 11 cartoons in this series.

== Filmography ==
All films except for outsourced cartoons are directed by Dave Fleischer.

#	Title	Original release date	Reissue release date	Animation	Story	Characters	Notes
1	The Dandy Lion	September 20, 1940		James Culhane; Alfred Eugster	Dan Gordon	Indian, Lion	
2	Sneak, Snoop, and Snitch	October 25, 1940	December 1946	Willard Bowsky; Gordon Sheehan	Cal Howard	Sneak, Snoop, Snitch, King Little	A spin-off of Gulliver's Travels.
3	Mommy Loves Puppy	November 29, 1940		Willard Bowsky; James Davis	William Turner	Puppy, St. Bernard, Drunkened Walrus	
4	Bring Himself Back Alive	December 20, 1940		Tom Johnson; Graham Place	Cal Howard	Hyde Skinner, Turtle, Lion	
5	Twinkletoes Gets the Bird	March 14, 1941		David Tendlar; Thomas Golden	William Turner	Twinkletoes	A spin-off of Gulliver's Travels.
6	Triple Trouble	May 9, 1941		James Culhane; Nicholas Tafuri	George Hill	Sneak, Snoop, Snitch	A spin-off of Gulliver's Travels.
7	Zero the Hound	May 30, 1941		Tom Johnson; Frank Endres	Carl Meyer	Zero, Hunter	
8	Twinkletoes: Where He Goes - Nobody Knows	June 27, 1941	December 1946	David Tendlar; Stephen Muffati	Cal Howard	Twinkletoes, King Bombo	A spin-off of Gulliver's Travels.
9	Copy Cat	July 18, 1941	March 1947	Myron Waldman; William Henning	Bob Wickersham	Cats	
10	The Wizard of Arts	August 8, 1941		Tom Johnson; Jack Ozark	Jack Ward	Sculptor	Bob Hope and Harpo Marx are caricatured. Jack Ozark's only on-screen credit.
11	Twinkletoes in Hat Stuff	August 29, 1941		Myron Waldman; Sam Stimson	Carl Meyer	Twinkletoes	A spin-off of Gulliver's Travels.

Other films released by Paramount as Animated Antics include these two non-Fleischer short films:

Title	Producer	Release date	Animation	Story	Characters	Notes
Pop and Mom in Wild Oysters	Charles R. Bowers	February 14, 1941	Harold Muller		Pop and Mom	A stop motion film produced by the Charles Bowers Studios.
Speaking of Animals Down on the Farm	Jerry Fairbanks	April 18, 1941	Tex Avery; Lou Lilly			A live-action film produced by Jerry Fairbanks.
