= Hunky and Spunky =

Animated fictional characters

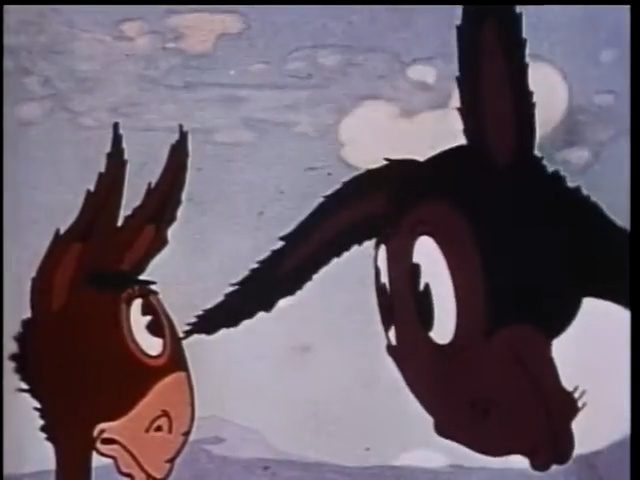
Spunky (left) and Hunky in their first appearance in the 1938 short.

Hunky and Spunky are fictional characters appearing in a series of animated short subjects produced by Fleischer Studios for Paramount Pictures from 1938 to 1941. Filmed in Technicolor (three-strip), the series revolves around a mother burro and her son.

== History ==
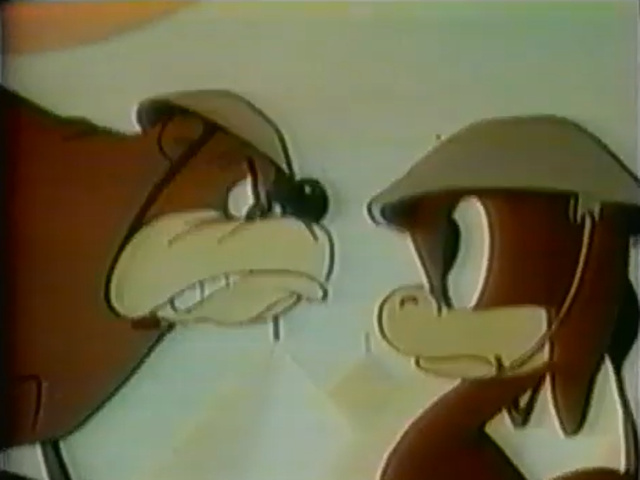
Spunky in Yankee Doodle Donkey (1944)

Hunky is a mother burro and Spunky is her young son. The initial film, titled Hunky and Spunky, takes place in the Old West, where a prospector attempts to make Spunky into his pack animal. Hunky and Spunky was nominated for the 1938 Academy Award for Best Short Subject (Cartoons). A positive contemporary review of Hunky and Spunky in Film Daily praised the short for introducing "funny new characters", and stated that the short's device of having the animals speak in "donkey talk" "will amuse the kids".

Fleischer Studios went on to produce six more cartoons featuring Hunky and Spunky: Always Kickin' (1939), The Barnyard Brat (1939), A Kick in Time (1940), Snubbed by a Snob (1940), You Can't Shoe a Horse Fly (1940), and Vitamin Hay (1941).

After Famous Studios succeeded Fleischer Studios in 1942, they revived the Spunky character alone for three animated shorts in their Noveltoons series: the patriotic Yankee Doodle Donkey (1944), in a supporting role to Casper the Friendly Ghost in Boo Kind To Animals (1955), and in a simplified drawing style in Okey Dokey Donkey (1958). A donkey which looks similar to Spunky has a cameo role in the 1957 Casper cartoon Ghost of Honor.

== Filmography ==
=== Color Classics ===
Title	Original release date	Directed by
Hunky and Spunky	June 24, 1938	Dave Fleischer
Always Kickin'	January 27, 1939	Dave Fleischer
The Barnyard Brat	June 30, 1939	Dave Fleischer
A Kick in Time	May 17, 1940	Dave Fleischer
Snubbed by a Snob	July 19, 1940	Dave Fleischer
You Can't Shoe a Horse Fly	August 23, 1940	Dave Fleischer
Vitamin Hay	August 22, 1941	Dave Fleischer

=== Noveltoons ===
Title	Directed by	Animated by	Story by	Scenics by	Original release date
Yankee Doodle Donkey	I. Sparber	Nick Tafuri, Tom Golden	Jack Mercer, Jack Ward	N/A	November 27, 1944
Okey Dokey Donkey	I. Sparber	Al Eugster, Dante Barbetta	Jack Mercer	John Zago	May 16, 1958

=== Casper The Friendly Ghost ===
Title	Directed by	Animated by	Story by	Scenics by	Original release date
Boo Kind to Animals	I. Sparber	Tom Golden, Bill Hudson	Carl Meyer	Robert Owen	December 23, 1955
Ghost of Honor	I. Sparber	Myron Waldman, Nick Tafuri	I. Klein	Robert Owen	July 19, 1957
