= David Tendlar =

American animator (1909–1993)

Dave Tendlar
- Born: David Benjamin Tendlar; August 8, 1909; Dayton, Ohio, U.S.
- Died: September 9, 1993 (aged 84); Los Angeles, California, U.S.
- Other name: David Tendlar
- Occupations: animator, animation director, supervisor
- Years active: 1927–1981
- Employers: Wrinker Pictures (1927-1929); Fleischer Studios (1931-1942); Famous Studios (1942-1958); Terrytoons (1958-1971); Filmation (1960s); Hal Seeger Productions (1960s); Hanna-Barbera (1972-1981)

David Benjamin Tendlar (August 8, 1909 – September 9, 1993) was an American animator, best known for his work with Fleischer Studios and its successor, Famous Studios.

== Career ==
Dave Tendlar was born in Dayton, Ohio on August 8, 1909, and attended Stivers High School. Initially starting his career at Winkler Pictures in the late 1920's, he joined Fleischer Studio in 1931 where he worked on Betty Boop, Popeye the Sailor, and many other shorts, as well as Fleischer's two feature-length animated films.

He stayed on when Paramount Pictures foreclosed on Fleischer and reorganized the company into Famous Studios. He served as an animator and animation director for a number of cartoons, including numerous Noveltoons shorts, Herman and Katnip, Buzzy the Crow, and Baby Huey. He would later become a director in 1953. His shorts were noted for having gags considerably more violent when compared to the rest of the studio's output.

Tendlar left in 1958 and later did work for Terrytoons, Hal Seeger Productions, Filmation and Hanna-Barbera. In addition to his animation work, Tendlar moonlighted as a comic book artist, providing illustrations for Jingle Jangle Comics and Harvey Comics as well as producing promotional comic books. He died in Los Angeles, California on September 9, 1993, one month after his 84th birthday.
