= Roland Crandall =

American animator (1892–1972)

- Born: August 29, 1892; New Canaan, Connecticut
- Died: August 14, 1972 (aged 79); Greenwich, Connecticut
- Occupation: Animator
- Spouse: Julia K. Hayes
- Children: Roland Davenport Crandall
- Parent(s): Charles Henry Crandall and Mary Vere Davenport

Roland Dimon "Doc" Crandall (August 29, 1892 – August 14, 1972) was an American animator. He is best known for his work at Fleischer Studios, especially on the Betty Boop film Snow-White and as lead animator with Seymour Kneitel on the first year of the Popeye the Sailor cartoons starting in 1933.

Crandall was born in New Canaan, Connecticut, and attended the Yale School of Art. He was one of the first employees of Fleischer Studios, working on the Koko the Clown shorts in the 1920s. Crandall's drawing ability was legendary; he animated virtually the entirety of the 1933 Betty Boop short Snow-White by himself. The film has been deemed "culturally significant" by the United States Library of Congress and selected for preservation in the National Film Registry. In 1994 it was voted #19 of the 50 Greatest Cartoons of all time by members of the animation field.

Crandall retired from animation in 1941 when Paramount Pictures acquired Fleischer Studios and renamed it Famous Studios. He moved to Bridgeport, Connecticut, where he worked as a commercial illustrator. Crandall died on August 14, 1972, in Greenwich, Connecticut.
