= Sammy Timberg =

American musician and composer (1903–1992)

- Born: May 21, 1903; New York City, U.S.
- Died: August 26, 1992 (aged 89); Scranton, Pennsylvania, U.S.
- Occupation: Composer
- Spouses: Rosemarie Sinnott (m. 1938; div. 1954): Maria Davis
- Children: 3, including Robert Timberg
- Relatives: Herman Timberg (brother)

Samuel Timberg (May 21, 1903 – August 26, 1992) was an American musician and composer for the stage, film studios, and television.

== Biography ==
Timberg was born in New York City to a Jewish family originating in Austria, youngest son of Israel and Mary Timberg and brother of vaudeville performers Herman Timberg and Hattie Darling. He studied piano under Rubin Goldmark with hopes of becoming a classical performer; the death of his father in 1919, however, forced him to leave his studies and find work. Just 16, Sammy joined Herman's act as a straight man, and also began conducting the orchestra.

To increase the family earnings, Herman also wrote material for other acts, including Georgie Price and Clark and McCullough (and, a few years later, Phil Silvers). In 1920 the Timbergs were hired by Chico Marx to develop a follow-up to the Marx Brothers hit revue Home Again after the failure of the 1918 Kahn/Swerling production Cinderella Girl. In February 1921 the Marx Brothers introduced On The Mezzanine which toured across the US and in Britain; it was written by Herman and managed by Hattie, while 18-year old Sammy led the orchestra and co-wrote the music.

Sammy also found work with other performers and in 1929 supplied songs for Broadway revues Broadway Nights, Dutchess of Chicago, and The Street Singer, all choreographed by Busby Berkeley. He also worked for the Shuberts, and organized and led his own touring orchestra.

Timberg was perhaps most famous for the music he wrote for cartoons while music director of the Fleischer Studios, such as Popeye, Betty Boop, and Superman. He also contributed songs to two Fleischer feature-length animated films, Gulliver's Travels and Mr. Bug Goes to Town. Possibly his best known and most-recorded song, It's a Hap-Hap-Happy Day, was a feature from Gulliver. He remained with the organization to compose shorts when the Fleischers were succeeded by Famous Studios, serving as the studio's musical director until Winston Sharples officially succeeded him in 1945. Timberg later moved to Columbia Pictures to work on their short subjects, including for their cartoon division Screen Gems. He was, however, not credited for any sort of work there.

He composed and conducted the score for MGM recording of the Lionel Barrymore A Christmas Carol. He unsuccessfully managed the early career of Jackie Gleason, and wrote music for Gleason, Frank Sinatra, Eydie Gormé, and others until he retired in the 1960s.

In the 1960s, Timberg moved to Scranton, Pennsylvania, where he died in 1992. Despite being retired, he still wrote music for fun and occasionally gave public performances in the Scranton area up until a few months before his death. He was the father of writer and journalist Robert Timberg, Patricia Timberg and Rosemarie Eisenberg Shaw.

== Well-known songs ==
- Don't Take My Boop-Oop-A-Doop Away (1931)
- Brotherly Love (1936), from the Popeye cartoon of that name.
- It's a Hap-Hap-Happy Day (1939), with Sharples and Nieburg
- Superman March (1940) Look! Up in the sky...
- Boy, Oh Boy (1941) with Frank Loesser
- Help Yourself To My Heart (1947), Frank Sinatra

In 2004, Timberg's daughter Pat released a CD of his music: Boop-Oop-A-Doin': modern recordings of Sammy Timberg, composer for the Max Fleischer toons.

== See also ==
- Bob Rothberg
- Ants in the Plants
