= Max Fleischer =

American animator and inventor (1883–1972)

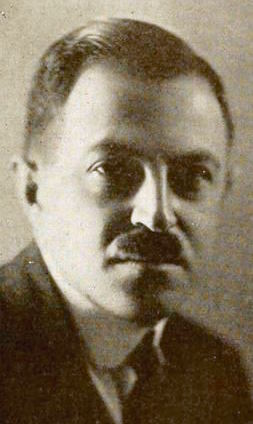
- Fleischer in 1919
- Born: Majer Fleischer; July 19, 1883; Kraków, Austrian Galicia, Austria-Hungary (now Poland)
- Died: September 11, 1972 (aged 89); Los Angeles, California, U.S.
- Occupations: Animator; inventor; film director; film producer
- Years active: 1914–1962
- Spouse: Ethel "Essie" Goldstein (m. 1905)
- Children: 2, including Richard Fleischer
- Relatives: Dave Fleischer (brother); Lou Fleischer (brother); Seymour Kneitel (son-in-law); Ethel Fleischer (sister)

Max Fleischer (/ˈflaɪʃər/; born Majer Fleischer, German: [ˈflaɪʃɐ]; July 19, 1883 – September 11, 1972) was an American animator and studio owner. Born in Kraków, in Austrian Poland, Fleischer immigrated to the United States where he became a pioneer in the development of the animated cartoon and served as the head of Fleischer Studios, which he co-founded with his younger brother Dave.

He brought such comic characters as Koko the Clown, Betty Boop, Popeye, and Superman to the movie screen, and was responsible for several technological innovations, including the Rotoscope, the "Follow the Bouncing Ball" technique pioneered in the Ko-Ko Song Car-Tunes films, and the "Stereoptical Process". Film director Richard Fleischer was his son.

== Early life ==
Majer Fleischer was born July 19, 1883, (Note: Fleischer biographer Ray Pointer gives the alternative date of July 18, 1883. Film historians Maurice Horn and Richard Marschall point out that, although dates as varied as 1883, 1884, 1885, and others have been given, the correct and verified date is 1883.) to a Polish Jewish family in Kraków (then in Austrian Galicia in the Austro-Hungarian Empire). He was the second of six children of a tailor from Dąbrowa Tarnowska, Aaron Fleischer, who later changed his name to William in the United States, and Malka "Amelia" Pałasz. His family emigrated to the United States in March 1887, settling in New York City, where he attended public school. During his early formative years, he enjoyed a middle-class lifestyle, the result of his father's success as an exclusive tailor to high society clients. This changed drastically after his father lost his business ten years later. His teens were spent in Brownsville, a poor Jewish neighborhood in Brooklyn. He continued his education at evening high school. He received commercial art training at Cooper Union and formal art instruction at the Art Students League of New York, studying under George Bridgman. He also attended the Mechanics and Tradesman's School in midtown Manhattan.

Fleischer began his career at The Brooklyn Daily Eagle. Beginning as an errand boy, he advanced to photographer, photoengraver, and eventually, staff cartoonist. At first, he drew single-panel editorial cartoons, but then graduated to the full strips "Little Algie" and "S.K. Sposher, the Camera Fiend". These satirical strips reflected his life in Brownsville and his fascination with technology and photography, respectively—both displaying his sense of irony and fatalism. It was during this period he met newspaper cartoonist and early animator, John Randolph Bray, who would later give him his start in the animation field.

On December 25, 1905, Fleischer married his childhood sweetheart, Ethel (Essie) Goldstein. On the recommendation of Bray, Fleischer was hired as a technical illustrator for the Electro-Light Engraving Company in Boston. In 1909 he moved to Syracuse, New York, working as a catalog illustrator for the Crouse-Hinds Company, and a year later returned to New York as art editor for Popular Science magazine under editor Waldemar Kaempffert.

== Career ==
=== The Rotoscope ===
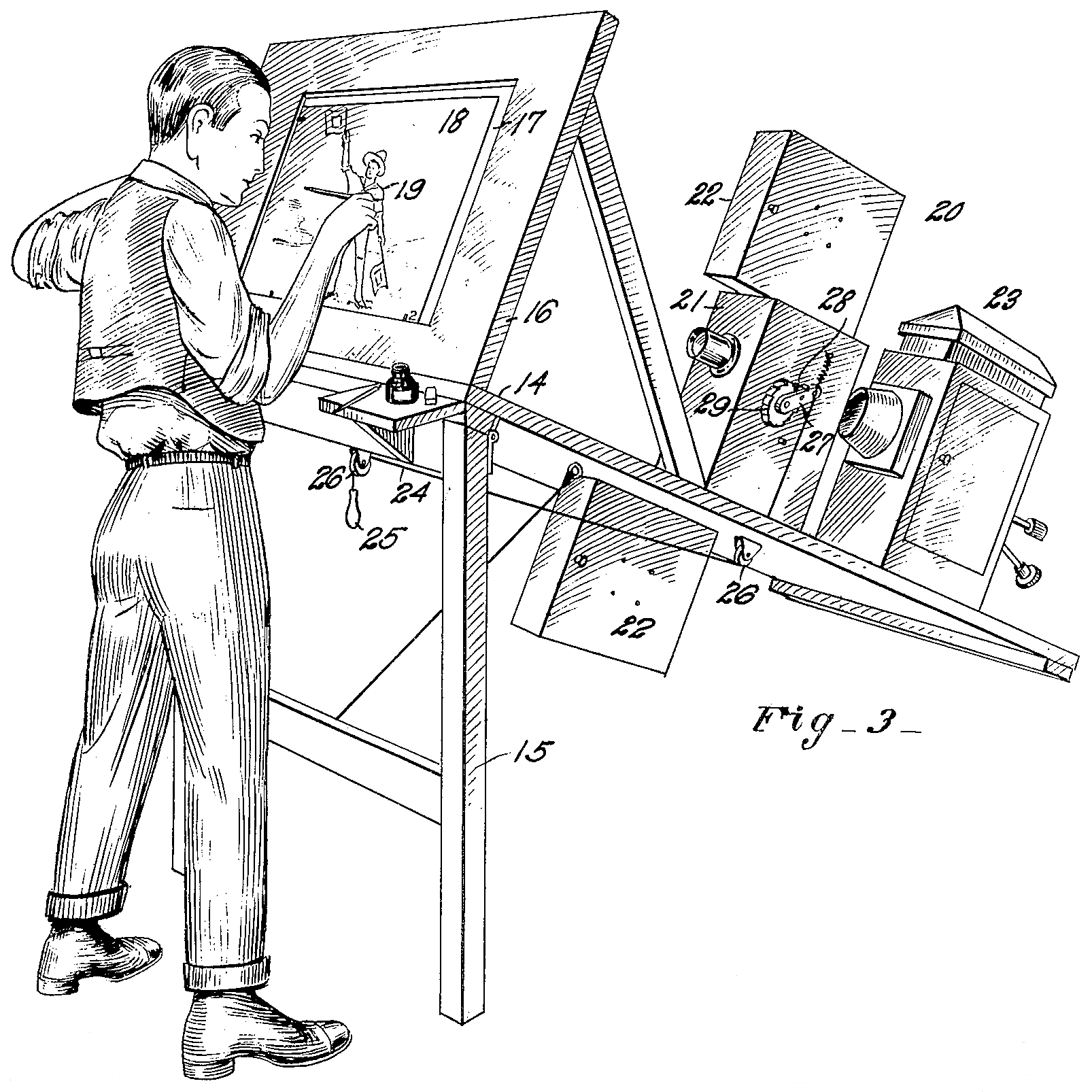
The Rotoscope, one of Fleischer's inventions

By 1914, the first commercially produced animated cartoons began to appear in movie theaters. They tended to be stiff and jerky. Fleischer devised an improvement in animation through a combined projector and easel for tracing images from a live-action film. This device, known as the Rotoscope, enabled Fleischer to produce the first realistic animation since the initial works of Winsor McCay. Although his patent was granted in 1917, Max and his brothers Joe and Dave Fleischer made their first series of tests between 1914 and 1916.

=== First venture ===
The Pathé Film exchange offered Max his first opportunity as a producer due in part to the fact that Dave had been working there as a film cutter since 1914. Max chose a political satire of a hunting trip by Theodore Roosevelt. After several months of labor, the film was rejected, and Max was making the rounds again when he was reunited with John R. Bray at Paramount Pictures. Bray had a distribution contract with Paramount at the time and hired Max as production supervisor for his studio. With the outbreak of World War I, Max was sent to Fort Sill, Oklahoma to produce the first Army training films on subjects that included Contour Map Reading, Operating the Stokes Mortar, Firing the Lewis Machine Gun, and Submarine Mine Laying. Following the Armistice, Fleischer returned to Bray and the production of theatrical and educational films.

=== The Inkwell Studios ===
Fleischer produced his Out of the Inkwell films featuring "The Clown" character, which his brother Dave originated; he had worked as a sideshow clown at Coney Island. It was one of the later tests made from footage of Dave as a clown that interested Bray.

Fleischer's initial series was first produced at the Bray Studios and released as a monthly installment in the Bray-Goldwyn Pictograph Screen Magazine from 1919 to 1921. In addition to producing Out of the Inkwell, Max's position at Bray was primarily production manager, and supervisor of several educational and technical films such as The Electric Bell, All Aboard for the Moon, and Hello, Mars. And it was as production manager that Fleischer hired his first animator, Roland Crandall, who remained with him throughout the active years of Fleischer's studio.

Out of the Inkwell featured the novelty of combining live action and animation and served as semi-documentaries with the appearance of Max Fleischer as the artist who dipped his pen into the ink bottle to produce the clown figure on his drawing board. While the technique of combining animation with live action was already established by others at the Bray Studio, it was Fleischer's clever use of it combined with Fleischer's realistic animation that made his series unique.

In 1921, Max and Dave established Out of the Inkwell Films, Incorporated, and continued production of Out of the Inkwell through various states-rights distributors. "The Clown" had no name until 1924, when Dick Huemer came aboard after animating on the early Mutt and Jeff cartoons. He set the style for the series, redesigning "The Clown", and named him "Ko-Ko". Huemer created Ko-Ko's canine companion, known as Fitz, and moved the Fleischers away from their dependency on the Rotoscope for fluid animation, leaving it for special uses and reference points where compositing was involved. Because Max valued Huemer's work, he instructed Huemer to make just the key poses and have an assistant fill in the remaining drawings. Max assigned Arthur Davis as Huemer's assistant, making him the first inbetweener.

It was during this time that Max developed Rotoscoping, a means of photographing live action film footage with animation cels for a composited image. This was an improvement over the method used by Bray where a series of 8" x 10" stills were made from motion picture film and used as backgrounds behind animation cels. The Rotograph technique went into more general use as "aerial image photography" and was a staple in animation and optical effects companies for making titles and various forms of matte composites.

In addition to the theatrical comedy films, Fleischer produced technical and educational films including That Little Big Fellow and Now You're Talking for A.T.&T. In 1923, he made two 20-minute features explaining Albert Einstein's Theory of Relativity and Charles Darwin's Evolution using animated special effects and live action.

=== Red Seal ===
In 1924, Fleischer partnered with Edwin Miles Fadiman, Hugo Riesenfeld and Lee de Forest to form Red Seal Pictures Corporation, which owned 36 theaters on the East Coast, extending as far west as Cleveland, Ohio. During this period, Fleischer invented the "Follow the Bouncing Ball" technique in his Ko-Ko Song Car-Tunes series of animated sing-along shorts. In these films, the lyrics of a song appear on screen and theater patrons are encouraged to sing along with the characters. An animated ball bounces across the top of the lyrics to indicate when words should be sung.

Of the 36 Song Car-Tunes 12 used the De Forest Phonofilm sound-on-film process, the first of which was My Old Kentucky Home in 1926. This preceded Walt Disney's Steamboat Willie (1928), which has been erroneously cited for decades as the first cartoon to synchronize sound with animation. The Song Car-Tunes series lasted until early 1927 and was interrupted by the bankruptcy of the Red Seal company—just five months before the start of the sound era.

Alfred Weiss, owner of Artcraft Pictures, approached Fleischer with a contract to produce cartoons for Paramount. Due to legal complications of the bankruptcy, the Out of the Inkwell series was renamed The Inkwell Imps and ran from 1927 to 1929. This was the start of Fleischer's relationship with the huge Paramount organization, which lasted for the next 15 years. After a year, the Fleischer brothers started experiencing mismanagement under Weiss and left the company in late 1928. Inkwell Films, Inc. filed for bankruptcy in January 1929, and Fleischer formed Fleischer Studios, Inc. in March 1929.

=== Fleischer Studios, Inc. ===
Fleischer first set up operations at Carpenter-Goldman Laboratories in Queens with a small staff (see Fleischer Studios). After eight months, his new company was solvent enough to move back to its former location at 1600 Broadway, where it remained until 1938. At Carpenter-Goldman, Fleischer began producing industrial films including Finding His Voice (1929), a demonstration film illustrating the Western Electric Variable Density sound recording and reproduction method. Despite the conflicts with Weiss, Fleischer managed to negotiate a new contract with Paramount to produce a revised version of the "Song Car-tunes", produced with sound and renamed Screen Songs, beginning with The Sidewalks of New York.

At this early stage in the sound era, Fleischer produced many technically advanced films that were the result of his continued research and development that perfected the post-production method of sound recording. Several of these devices provided visual cues for the musical conductor to follow. As dialogue and songs became major elements, more precise analysis of soundtracks was possible through other inventions from Fleischer such as "The Cue Meter".

=== Betty Boop ===
Max Fleischer's Betty Boop character was born out of a cameo caricature in the early Talkartoon, Dizzy Dishes (1930). Fashioned after popular singer Helen Kane, she originated as a hybrid poodle/canine figure and was such a sensation in the New York preview that Paramount encouraged Fleischer to develop her into a continuing character. While she originated under animator Myron "Grim" Natwick, she was transformed into a human female under Seymour Kneitel and Berny Wolf and became Fleischer's most famous character.

The "Betty Boop" series began in 1932 and became a big success for Fleischer. That same year, Helen Kane filed a lawsuit against Fleischer, Fleischer Studios, and Paramount claiming that the cartoons were a deliberate caricature of her, created unfair competition, and had ruined her career. The suit went to trial in 1934. Judge Edward J. McGoldrick ruled, "The plaintiff has failed to sustain either cause of action by proof of sufficient probative force." In his opinion, the "baby" technique of singing did not originate with Kane.

=== Popeye the Sailor ===
Fleischer's greatest business decision came with his licensing of the comic strip character Popeye the Sailor, who was introduced to audiences in the Betty Boop cartoon short, Popeye the Sailor (1933). Popeye became one of the most successful screen adaptations of a comic strip in cinema history. Much of this success was due to the perfect match of the Fleischer Studio style combined with its unique use of music. By the late 1930s, a survey indicated that Popeye had eclipsed Mickey Mouse in popularity, challenging Disney's preeminence in the market.

=== Paramount ===
During its zenith by the mid-1930s, Fleischer Studios was producing four series, Betty Boop, Popeye, Screen Songs, and Color Classics, resulting in 52 releases each year. From the very beginning, Fleischer's business relationship with Paramount was a joint financial and distribution arrangement, making his studio a service company supplying products for the company's theaters. During the Great Depression, Paramount went through four bankruptcy reorganizations, which affected their operational expenses.

As a founding member of the Society of Motion Picture Engineers, Fleischer was aware of the technical advancements of the industry, particularly in the development of color cinematography. Due to Paramount's financial restructuring, he was unable to acquire the three-color Technicolor process from the start. Walt Disney, who was then a small independent producer, exploited the opportunity to acquire a four-year exclusivity deal. With this, he created a new market for color cartoons beginning with Flowers and Trees (1932), while preventing his competitors, including the Fleischers, from using it. In 1934 Paramount approved color production for Fleischer, but he was left with the limited two-color processes of Cinecolor (red and cyan) and Two-Color Technicolor (red and cyan) for the first year of his Color Classics. The first entry, Poor Cinderella (1934) was made in the two-emulsion/two-color Cinecolor Process and starred Betty Boop in her only color appearance. By 1936, Disney's exclusivity had expired, and Fleischer had the benefit of the three-color Technicolor Process beginning with Somewhere in Dreamland.

These color cartoons were often augmented with Fleischer's patented three-dimensional effects promoted as the "Stereoptical Process", a precursor to Disney's Multiplane animation. This technique used 3-D model sets replacing flat pan backgrounds, with the animation cels photographed in front. This technique was used to the greatest degree in the two-reel Popeye Features Popeye the Sailor Meets Sinbad the Sailor (1936) and Popeye the Sailor Meets Ali Baba's Forty Thieves (1937). These double-length cartoons demonstrated Fleischer's interest in animated feature films. While Fleischer petitioned for this for three years, it was not until the New York opening at Radio City of Disney's Snow White and the Seven Dwarfs (February 1938) that Paramount executives realized the value of animated features and ordered one for a 1939 Christmas release.

=== Decline ===
The popularity of the Popeye cartoons created a demand for more. To meet Paramount's demands, the studio was challenged with rapid expansion, production speed-ups, and crowded working conditions. Finally, in May 1937, Fleischer Studios was affected by a five-month strike, resulting in a boycott that kept the studio's releases off theater screens until November. Having a paternal attitude towards his employees, Max took it personally, as if he had been betrayed, and thus developed an ulcer. Following the strike, Max and Dave Fleischer decided to move the studio for more space and to escape further labor agitation.

In March 1938, Paramount approved Max's proposal to produce a feature just when he was preparing to move the studio from New York City to Miami, Florida. Once in Miami, relations between Max and Dave began deteriorating, beginning with the pressures to deliver their first feature.

Jonathan Swift's classic novel Gulliver's Travels was a favorite of Max's and was pressed into production. Fleischer and Paramount originally budgeted the film Gulliver's Travels at $500,000 (equal to $11,572,967 today), the same miscalculation made by Disney with Snow White. The final cost for Gulliver's Travels was $1.5 million. It played limited engagements with only 24 prints in 36 theaters during the 1939 Christmas season, but grossed more than $3 million during the Christmas week, giving Paramount a profit of $1.5 million before going into foreign release. But Fleischer Studios was penalized $350,000 for going over budget, and the contract did not allow Max and Fleischer Studios participation in the foreign earnings. This was the beginning of the financial difficulties of Fleischer Studios with reduced royalties due to this debt to Paramount.

In 1940, Max was relegated to business affairs and continued technical development. His efforts resulted in a reflex camera viewfinder and research into line transfer methods to replace the time-consuming and tedious process of cel inking. While ahead of his time, that same year Fleischer and Paramount experienced lost revenues owing to the failure of the new series Gabby, Animated Antics, and Stone Age, all launched under the leadership of Dave. After Republic Studios allegedly failed to develop Superman as a live-action serial, Max acquired the license that fall and initiated development.

The cost for the Superman series has been grossly overstated for decades on the basis of Dave Fleischer's UCLA 1968 Oral History interview by Joe Adamson. The actual figure stated in Fleischer's 1941 contract was in the $30,000 range, twice the cost of a Popeye cartoon. Superman was a "serious" type of cartoon that was not being made by rival studios which features anthropomorphic comic animal characters. The science fiction/fantasy elements of Superman appealed to Max's interests, finally leading the studio into maturity and relevance for the 1940s.

The early returns on Gulliver prompted Paramount president Barney Balaban to order a second feature for a 1941 Christmas release. This second feature, Mr. Bug Goes to Town, was unique, having a contemporary setting. Most importantly, it was technically and artistically superior to Gulliver's Travels. Paramount had high hopes for this Christmas 1941 release, which was well received by critics during its December 5 preview. However the exhibitors rejected it, fearing that it would not do business because it was not a Disney animated Fairy Tale. And with the bombing of Pearl Harbor two days after the preview, the original Christmas release due in three weeks was cancelled.

With the cancellation of Mr. Bug Goes to Town, Max was called to a meeting with Balaban in New York, where he was asked for his resignation. Dave had resigned following the completion of post-production on Mr. Bug in late November 1941, but failed to include a copy to Fleischer Studios. Had Max Fleischer received this notice, he would not have sent his telegram stating that as of November 27, 1941 he "could no longer work with Dave Fleischer." This statement, the result of his continued frustrations over their relationship during the production of their last feature, was viewed as a resignation, but not intended as such. As a result, the transfer of ownership to Paramount occurred on January 2, 1942. Paramount finished out the remaining five months of the 1941 Fleischer contract with the absence of both Max and Dave Fleischer, and the name change to Famous Studios became official on May 27, 1942. Paramount installed new management, among them Max's son-in-law, Seymour Kneitel.

=== Later career ===
Unable to form a studio due to the demand for military training films, Fleischer was brought in as head of the animation department for the industrial film company, The Jam Handy Organization in Detroit, Michigan. While there he supervised the technical and cartoon animation departments, producing training films for the Army and Navy. Fleischer was also involved with top-secret research and development for the war effort including an aircraft bomber sighting system. In 1944, he published Noah's Shoes, a metaphoric account of the building and loss of his studio, casting himself as Noah.

Following the war, he supervised the production of the animated adaptation of Rudolph the Red-Nosed Reindeer (1948), sponsored by Montgomery Ward. Fleischer left Handy in 1953 and returned as production manager for the Bray Studios in New York, where he developed an educational television pilot about unusual birds and animals titled, Imagine That!

In 1954, Max's son, Richard Fleischer, was directing 20,000 Leagues Under the Sea for Walt Disney Productions. This brought about an honorary luncheon that united Max with his former competitor and reunited him with several former Fleischer animators who were then employed by Disney. Despite having disliked Disney for causing his career's decline, he warmed up to Disney's commitment to quality, developing a friendship that lasted until Disney's death in 1966.

Fleischer won a lawsuit against Paramount in 1955 over the removal of his name from the credits of his films. While Fleischer had issues over the breach of contract, he had avoided suing for a decade to protect his son-in-law, Seymour Kneitel, who was a lead director at Paramount's Famous Studios. In 1958, Fleischer revived Out of the Inkwell Films, Inc. and partnered with his former animator Hal Seeger, to produce 100 color Out of the Inkwell (1960–1961) cartoons for television. Actor Larry Storch performed the voices for Koko the Clown and supporting characters Kokonut and Mean Moe. While Max appeared in the un-aired pilot, he became too ill to appear in the series, and, in poor health, he spent the rest of his life attempting to regain ownership of Betty Boop.

Fleischer and wife Essie moved to the Motion Picture Country House in 1967. Fleischer died from arterial sclerosis of the brain on September 11, 1972, two months after his 89th birthday. In the announcement of his death, Time Magazine labeled him the "dean of animated cartoons". His death preceded the reclaiming of his star character, Betty Boop, and a national retrospective.

The anthology film The Betty Boop Scandals of 1974 started the Fleischer Renaissance with new 35mm prints of a selection of the best Fleischer cartoons made between 1928 and 1934. This was followed by The Popeye Follies. These special theatrical programs generated interest in Max Fleischer as the alternative to Walt Disney, spawning a new wave of film research devoted to an expanded interest in animation beyond trivial entertainment.

== Bibliography ==
- Krakowski, Andrzej (2011). Pollywood: jak stworzyliśmy Hollywood (Pollywood. How we created Hollywood). Wydawnictwo Naukowe PWN. ISBN 978-0-7432-0481-1.
- Bendazzi, Giannalberto (2016). Animation: A World History. Volume I: Foundations—The Golden Age. New York: Taylor & Francis. ISBN 9781138854529.
- Cabarga, Leslie (1988). The Fleischer Story. New York: DaCapo Press. ISBN 9780306803130.
- Fleischer, Richard (2011). Out of the Inkwell: Max Fleischer and the Animation Revolution. Lexington, Ky.: University Press of Kentucky. ISBN 9780813134642.
- Horn, Maurice; Marschall, Richard (1983). The World Encyclopedia of Cartoons. New York: Chelsea House Publishers. ISBN 9780877543992.
- Pointer, Ray (2017). The Art and Inventions of Max Fleischer: American Animation Pioneer. Jefferson, N.C.: McFarland & Co. ISBN 9781476663678.
- Scivally, Bruce (2008). Superman On Film, Television, Radio, and Broadway. Jefferson, N.C.: McFarland & Co. ISBN 9780786431663.
- Smith, Scott (1998). The Film 100: A Ranking of the Most Influential People in the History of the Movies. Seacaucus, N.J.: Crol Publishing Group. ISBN 9780806519401.
