= Dave Fleischer =

American film director and producer (1894–1979)

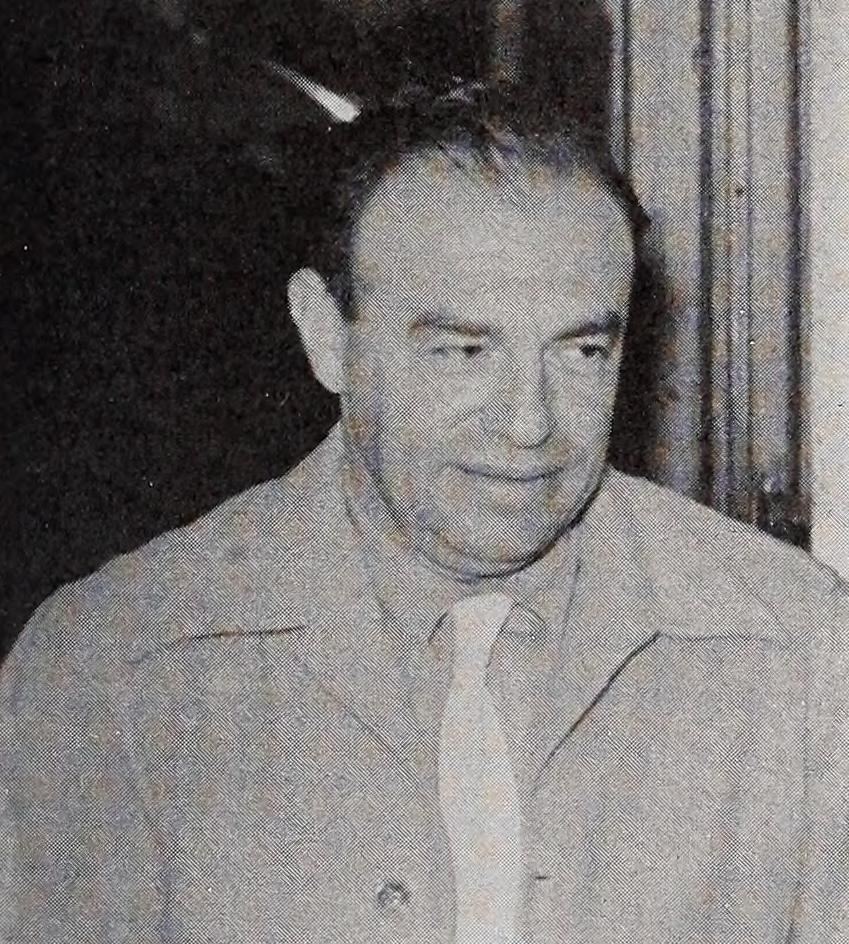
- Fleischer, c. 1940
- Born: July 14, 1894; New York City, U.S.
- Died: June 25, 1979 (aged 84); Los Angeles, California, U.S.
- Resting place: Mount Sinai Memorial Park Cemetery
- Occupations: Animation director; film director; producer
- Years active: 1918–1967
- Spouses: Ida Sharnow (m. 1919; div. 1940) Mae Schwartz (m. 1945)
- Relatives: Max Fleischer (brother); Lou Fleischer (brother); Richard Fleischer (nephew); Ruth Fleischer (niece); Seymour Kneitel (nephew-in-law)

Dave Fleischer (/ˈflaɪʃər/; July 14, 1894 – June 25, 1979) was an American film director and producer who co-owned Fleischer Studios with his older brother Max Fleischer.

== Biography ==
=== Early life and career ===
Fleischer was the youngest of five brothers and grew up in Brownsville, Brooklyn, New York City, a poor Jewish neighbourhood. By the time he was born, his father had lost his means of livelihood due to the mass production of garments.

Fleischer worked as an usher at the Palace Theater on Broadway, where he was exposed to vaudeville. This experience contributed to the development of his sense for gags and comic timing, which came into play when he joined forces with his older brother, Max in the production of animated cartoons. At one point, the family lived in Coney Island, and he became interested in being a clown for one of the sideshow amusements. This clown character would be recalled a few years later in connection with Max's early experiments with his first major invention, "The Rotoscope", and was the source of their first character who evolved into Koko the Clown in the pioneering series, Out of the Inkwell.

Around 1913–14, he began working as a film cutter for Pathé Exchange the American branch of Pathé, the French company that was the world's largest film production and distribution company, and the largest manufacturer of film equipment in the first decades of the 20th century.

=== Fleischer Studios ===
In 1921, he joined forces with Max in starting their first studio, Out of the Inkwell Films, Inc. in a dingy basement apartment in midtown Manhattan. He went on to become director and later supervising producer of the studio's output. Among the cartoon series Fleischer supervised were Out of the Inkwell, Inklings, The Inkwell Imps, Talkartoons, Betty Boop, Popeye the Sailor, Color Classics. He also supervised two animated features Gulliver's Travels and Mr. Bug Goes to Town.

Following a relocation to Miami, Florida, and the production of their first feature, Gulliver's Travels, Fleischer Studios became indebted to Paramount Pictures due to the cost overruns on Gulliver and losses in rentals on the new 1940s cartoon series produced under Dave's control. The new series, including Stone Age Cartoons, Gabby and Animated Antics, were poorly received with theaters only valuing the Popeye cartoons. This forced the temporary surrender of Fleischer Studios to Paramount on May 24, 1941, while their final feature was contracted for completion.

Max Fleischer secured the license for Superman after Republic Pictures allegedly passed on the property as a potential serial. Budgeted at twice the cost of a Popeye cartoon, Superman became the most successful cartoon series of the late Fleischer Studio period, representing its maturing into the 1940s. Relations between the brothers began to deteriorate around 1938, which was aggravated further by Dave's taking control of production starting in 1940, which resulted in the declining quality of the cartoons produced under his control compounded by his continued rejection of Max's input and late completion of films.

=== Post-Fleischer career ===
Dave Fleischer resigned from Fleischer Studios in late November 1941, following the recording of the score for Mr. Bug Goes to Town. His official resignation was announced on December 31, 1941. He would then eventually become a producer for Screen Gems at Columbia Pictures in April 1942, where he produced Song of Victory (1942) and Imagination (1943), the latter of which was nominated for an Academy Award. Fleischer would later take over for Frank Tashlin and Ben Schwalb as head producer, where he produced The Fox and the Crow and Li'l Abner series, as well as the omnibus Phantasies series. In spite of the Oscar nominations, Fleischer was noted for being very detached from his staff according to director John Hubley, as well as editing completed cartoons in a way that broke continuity. Harry Cohn fired Fleischer in 1944, replacing him with Paul Worth.

After getting kicked out of Columbia, he approached Republic Pictures with an elf-like version of Koko the Clown, a character named "Snippy", who was tried out as a live action–animation combo novelty at the end of the low-budget nightclub musical, Trocadero. A "Snippy" cartoon series never materialized. Fleischer continued at Republic as associate producer of the minute-long animation sequence for another "B" movie, That's My Baby! (1944).

For a short period, he had a comic strip for The Hollywood Citizen News. In the early 1950s, Dave animated a series of Technicolor theatrical snipes for the Filmack Trailer Company of Chicago, Illinois. Filmack at the time was America's largest producer of both theatrical and commercial advertising for decades. It was at the same Filmack headquarters in Chicago that he famously animated the Let's All Go to the Lobby snipe in 1957.

Following a series of oddball assignments, Dave landed a permanent position as a "technical specialist" at Universal through animation producer, Walter Lantz. At Universal, Dave was a Special Effects Technical and general problem-solver, working on films such as Francis, The Birds, and Thoroughly Modern Millie. He was credited as "Technical Advisor" on Universal's American release of the Russian animated feature, The Snow Queen (1957), supervising the English language dubbing.

Following his assignment on Thoroughly Modern Millie, Fleischer retired and continued to live at the Peyton Hall apartment complex on Hollywood Boulevard until his death. Fleischer died of a stroke on June 25, 1979, at age 84. His wife died in 1991.
