= Popeye the Sailor filmography (Famous Studios) =

This is a list of the 122 cartoons of the Popeye the Sailor film series produced by Famous Studios (later known as Paramount Cartoon Studios) for Paramount Pictures from 1942 to 1957, with 14 in black-and-white and 108 in color. These cartoons were produced after Paramount took ownership of Fleischer Studios, which originated the Popeye series in 1933.

All cartoons are one-reel in length (6 to 10 minutes). The first 14 shorts (You're a Sap, Mr. Jap through Cartoons Ain't Human) are in black-and-white. All remaining cartoons (beginning with Her Honor the Mare) are in color. Unlike the Fleischer Studios shorts, the director credits for these shorts represent the actual director in charge of that short's production. The first animator credited handled the animation direction. The numbers listed next to each cartoon continue the numbering of the Fleischer entries.

== Short films ==
=== 1942 ===
#	Film	Original release date	Directed by	Animated by	Scenics by	Story by
109	You're a Sap, Mr. Jap	August 7	Dan Gordon	Jim Tyer; George Germanetti	TBA	Jim Tyer; Carl Meyer
Does not have the "Famous Studios" branding in the opening segment; No longer shown on American television due to World War II ethnic stereotyping of Japanese people and a scene involving a Japanese Naval Officer committing suicide by eating firecrackers and drinking gasoline; First cartoon directed by Dan Gordon
110	Alona on the Sarong Seas	September 4	Isadore Sparber	Dave Tendlar; Abner Kneitel	TBA	Jack Ward; Jack Mercer
Does not have the "Famous Studios" branding in the opening segment; The last version of the opening credits sequence from the last Fleischer Studios shorts is used, minus the "A Max Fleischer Cartoon" credit; First cartoon directed by Isadore Sparber; Dave Barry voices Bluto, as well as in A Hull of a Mess; Starting with this cartoon, Bluto was redesigned to appear more muscular compared to his previous appearances; Final entry of the 1941-42 film season.
111	A Hull of a Mess	October 16	Isadore Sparber	Al Eugster; Joe Oriolo	TBA	Jack Ward; Jack Mercer
First appearance of the "Famous Studios" branding in the opening segment.; First appearance of the opening segment with Popeye's head poking out of a porthole and tooting his pipe. The animation in this segment was the basis for the "spinning star" opening credits, lasting from Her Honor the Mare until the final cartoon in 1957, Spooky Swabs.; First entry of the 1942-43 film season.
112	Scrap the Japs	November 20	Seymour Kneitel	Tom Johnson; Ben Solomon	TBA	Carl Meyer
No longer shown on American television due to World War II ethnic stereotyping of Japanese people; First cartoon directed by Seymour Kneitel
113	Me Musical Nephews	December 25	Seymour Kneitel	Tom Johnson; George Germanetti	TBA	Jack Ward; Jack Mercer
The ending gag is cut from a.a.p. prints due to the involvement of the Paramount logo; In the public domain in the United States
=== 1943 ===
#	Film	Original release date	Directed by	Animated by	Scenics by	Story by
114	Spinach Fer Britain	January 22	Isadore Sparber	Jim Tyer; Abner Kneitel	TBA	Carl Meyer
Does not air on American television outside of any scheduled airings on The Popeye Show due to World War II content involving Nazi stereotypes; First cartoon where Popeye sings his full theme song when he appears since Popeye the Sailor Meets Sindbad the Sailor (1936); Final cartoon with "anchor" designed ending.
115	Seein' Red, White 'N' Blue	February 19	Dan Gordon	Jim Tyer; Ben Solomon	TBA	Joe Stultz
An edited-for-TV version is known to exist; Dave Barry voices Bluto; No longer shown on American television due to World War II ethnic stereotyping of Nazis and Japanese people
116	Too Weak to Work	March 19	Isadore Sparber	Jim Tyer; Abner Kneitel	TBA	Joe Stultz
Dave Barry voices Bluto; Final black and white cartoon featuring Bluto.
117	A Jolly Good Furlough	April 23	Dan Gordon	Joe Oriolo; John Walworth	TBA	Joseph Stultz
Some TV versions are edited to remove anti-Japanese dialogue spoken by Popeye's nephews; Twinkletoes the Carrier Pigeon from the Fleischer Studios film Gulliver's Travels appears.
118	Ration Fer the Duration	May 28	Seymour Kneitel	Dave Tendlar; Tom Golden	TBA	Jack Mercer; Jack Ward
A parody of Jack and the Beanstalk
119	The Hungry Goat	June 25	Dan Gordon	Joe Oriolo; John Walworth	TBA	Carl Meyer
The ending gag is cut from a.a.p. prints due to the involvement of the Paramount logo. This gag was recreated for airing on The Popeye Show and for the 2008 DVD release; First cartoon to feature the voice of Gilbert Mack (as Billy the Kid); Breaks the fourth wall
120	Happy Birthdaze	July 16	Dan Gordon	Graham Place; Abner Kneitel	TBA	Carl Meyer
The first of three cartoons to feature Popeye's Navy buddy, Shorty (voiced by Gilbert Mack); Except for uncut airings on The Popeye Show, the ending gag is usually cut from TV airings such as TBS and Boomerang in the United States due to its content suggesting murder, though the "murder" scene was in the dark
121	Wood-Peckin'	August 6	Izzy Sparber	Nick Tafuri; Tom Golden	TBA	Joe Stultz
All Voices are provided by Jack Mercer
122	Cartoons Ain't Human	September 3	Seymour Kneitel	Orestes Calpini; Otto Feuer	TBA	Jack Mercer; Jack Ward
Margie Hines voices Olive Oyl; All Other Voices are provided by Jack Mercer; Final black-and-white cartoon in the Popeye film series; The booing gag was reused by Popeye in Popeye's Premiere.; The redrawn print incorrectly uses the "Max Fleischer" title card of Popeye The Sailor Man.; Final entry of the 1942-43 film season.
123	Her Honor the Mare	November 5	Izzy Sparber	Jim Tyer; Ben Solomon	TBA	Jack Mercer; Jack Ward
All voices are provided by Jack Mercer; First regular Popeye the Sailor series entry in Technicolor (three two-reel Technicolor Popeye Color Specials were produced by Fleischer in the 1930s).; First of four cartoons where Popeye's sailor outfit is blue; First use of the "spinning star" opening credits; First entry of the 1943-44 film season.
124	The Marry-Go-Round	December 31	Seymour Kneitel	Graham Place; Abner Kneitel	TBA	Joe Stultz
The second appearance of Shorty.; Final appearance of Margie Hines as the voice of Olive Oyl; A restored version aired on The Popeye Show; The last Popeye cartoon to use the Western Electric "Noiseless Recording" sound system
=== 1944 ===
#	Film	Original release date	Directed by	Animated by	Scenics by	Story by
125	We're on Our Way to Rio	April 21	Isadore Sparber	James Tyer; Ben Solomon	TBA	Jack Mercer; Jack Ward
First of two cartoons to use special opening credits and introductory music; The first Popeye cartoon to use the RCA Photophone sound system; Final appearance of Dave Barry as the voice of Bluto; The last Popeye cartoon produced at the Fleischer/Famous studio in Miami, Florida. Famous moved to New York City (the original home of Fleischer Studios) in late 1943.; A restored version was prepared for The Popeye Show, but the show was cancelled before it could air; Some TV airings delete Popeye's "sambo dancer" line
126	The Anvil Chorus Girl	May 26	Isadore Sparber	Dave Tendlar; Morey Reden	TBA	Bill Turner; Jack Ward
Color remake of the Fleischer Studios short Shoein' Hosses; The first Popeye cartoon produced after Famous Studios moved back to New York; First appearance of Mae Questel as the voice of Olive Oyl since 1938's A Date to Skate; First appearance of Jackson Beck as the voice of Bluto. Beck would be the permanent voice for Bluto until The All-New Popeye Hour in 1978.; A restored version aired on The Popeye Show
127	Spinach Packin' Popeye	July 21	Isadore Sparber; Dave Fleischer (uncredited, archival)	Dave Tendlar; Joe Oriolo	TBA	Bill Turner
Compilation film; footage reused (with original soundtracks) from the Fleischer two-reel Popeye Color Specials Popeye the Sailor Meets Sindbad the Sailor and Popeye the Sailor Meets Ali Baba's Forty Thieves; A restored version aired on The Popeye Show
128	Puppet Love	August 11	Seymour Kneitel	Jim Tyer; William Henning	TBA	Joe Stultz
129	Pitchin' Woo at the Zoo	September 1	Isadore Sparber	Nick Tafuri; Tom Golden	TBA	Bill Turner; Jack Ward
A restored version aired on The Popeye Show
130	Moving Aweigh	September 22	Dan Gordon (uncredited)	Jim Tyer; Ben Solomon	TBA	Carl Meyer
Final film appearance of Shorty. Here, he is voiced by Arnold Stang rather than Gilbert Mack; A restored version aired on The Popeye Show; Final cartoon directed by Dan Gordon; Semi-remake of the Fleischer short Cops is Always Right; Although Olive Oyl appears in this cartoon, she doesn't speak at all.; Final entry of the 1943-44 film season.
131	She-Sick Sailors	December 8	Seymour Kneitel	Jim Tyer; Ben Solomon	TBA	Bill Turner; Otto Messmer
A parody of Superman, who had previously been featured in a Paramount cartoon series of his own; a brief snippet of the theme from the series is heard while Olive Oyl reads a Superman comic book.; Jackson Beck, who voices Bluto in this cartoon, was the announcer for The Adventures of Superman radio program at the time this cartoon was made.; Original Paramount version restored and distributed by Turner; First entry of the 1944-45 film season.
=== 1945 ===
#	Film	Original release date	Directed by	Animated by	Scenics by	Story by
132	Pop-Pie a la Mode	January 26	Isadore Sparber	Joe Oriolo; Morey Reden	TBA	Dave Tendlar
First appearance of the Paramount mountain with a red color scheme and solid blue sky in the opening; No longer shown on American television due to Black African native stereotyping
133	Tops in the Big Top	March 16	Isadore Sparber	Nick Tafuri; Tom Golden; John Walworth	Robert Little	Joe Stultz; Carl Meyer
Second of two cartoons to use special opening credits and introductory music; A restored version aired on The Popeye Show
134	Shape Ahoy	April 27	Isadore Sparber	James Tyer; Ben Solomon	TBA	Jack Ward; Irving Dressler
This is the first of the several cartoons where Mercer was unavailable to voice Popeye; however, this is the first and only time that Mae Questel provides Popeye's voice.; Original Paramount version restored and distributed by Turner; Despite the fact that Popeye and Bluto are wearing blue pants, it's possible that their Navy sailor suits are blue.
135	For Better or Nurse	June 8	Isadore Sparber	Dave Tendlar; John Gentilella	TBA	Joe Stultz; Irving Dressler
First time that Floyd Buckley (the voice of Popeye on the Popeye radio program) provides Popeye's voice since 1935's Be Kind to "Aminals".; A color remake of the Fleischer Studios short Hospitaliky
136	Mess Production	August 24	Seymour Kneitel	Graham Place; Lou Zukor	TBA	Bill Turner; Otto Messmer
The last time Jack Mercer voices Popeye until 1946's Rocket to Mars; An early appearance of the newly-designed Olive Oyl.; Final Popeye cartoon produced and released during World War II.; Final entry of the 1944-45 film season.
=== 1946 ===
#	Film	Original release date	Directed by	Animated by	Scenics by	Story by
137	House Tricks?	March 15	Seymour Kneitel	Graham Place; Martin Taras	TBA	Jack Ward; Carl Meyer
First Popeye short to have a separate opening title card for the "A Famous Studios Production" credit; Floyd Buckley voices Popeye; Color remake of the Max Fleischer short The House Builder-Upper; First entry of the 1945-46 film season.
138	Service with a Guile	April 19	Bill Tytla	James Tyer; Ben Solomon	TBA	Jack Ward; Carl Meyer
Floyd Buckley voices Popeye; The newly-designed Olive Oyl appears in the opening credits; however, she retains her old style in the cartoon.; First cartoon directed by Bill Tytla
139	Klondike Casanova	May 31	Isadore Sparber	Dave Tendlar; John Gentilella	TBA	I. Klein; George Hill
Second of four cartoons where Popeye's sailor outfit is blue; First time that Harry Foster Welch voices Popeye
140	Peep in the Deep	June 7	Seymour Kneitel	Jim Tyer; William Henning	TBA	Bill Turner; Otto Messmer
The first Popeye cartoon produced in Cinecolor; Original titles were retained in a.a.p. TV syndication print; Final short in which Floyd Buckley voices Popeye; Semi-remake of the Fleischer shorts Dizzy Divers and Stealin' Ain't Honest; Bluto reverts to his Fleischer-era character design for this cartoon only
141	Rocket to Mars	August 9	Bill Tytla	Jim Tyer; John Gentillela	Anton Loeb	Bill Turner; Otto Messmer
Produced in Cinecolor; Jack Mercer and Harry Foster Welch both voice Popeye (Mercer does 3/4 of this cartoon; Welch takes over near the end); Some TV versions are edited to remove a Japanese stereotype; Original Paramount version restored and distributed by Turner. However, syndicated TV airings on Boomerang have an editing error on the opening titles.; Early appearance of the newly-designed Olive Oyl
142	Rodeo Romeo	August 16	Isadore Sparber	Dave Tendlar; Martin Taras	Shane Miller	I. Klein; Joe Stultz
Harry Foster Welch voices Popeye
143	The Fistic Mystic	November 29	Seymour Kneitel	Graham Place; Nick Tafuri	Robert Little	I. Klein; Jack Ward
Harry Foster Welch voices Popeye; First regular appearance of the newly-designed Olive Oyl; Some TV versions are edited to remove a Black stereotype
144	The Island Fling	December 27	Bill Tytla	John Gentilella; George Germanetti	Robert Connavale	Woody Gelman; Larry Riley
Harry Foster Welch voices Popeye; An edited-for-TV version is known to exist; Although uncredited, Jim Tyer worked on this short; No longer shown on American television due to Black African native stereotyping; Final entry of the 1945-46 film season.
=== 1947 ===
#	Film	Original release date	Directed by	Animated by	Scenics by	Story by
145	Abusement Park	April 25	Isadore Sparber	Dave Tendlar; Tom Golden	Anton Loeb	Joe Stultz; Carl Meyer
Produced in Cinecolor; Final short in which Harry Foster Welch voices Popeye; Original Paramount version restored and distributed by Turner; First entry of the 1946-47 film season.
146	I'll Be Skiing Ya	June 13	Isadore Sparber	Tom Johnson; George Germanetti	Robert Connavale	Bill Turner; Larry Riley
First time Jack Mercer voices Popeye since 1946's Rocket to Mars. Mercer voices Popeye in all cartoons from here onward
147	Popeye and the Pirates	September 12	Seymour Kneitel	Dave Tendlar; Martin Taras	Robert Connavale	I. Klein; Jack Ward
All prints in circulation use an edited print which cuts out the scene where Popeye transitions from being in drag into having a sailor suit, presumably due to nudity. This clip has been edited out since the original theatrical showing in 1947. This clip is presumed lost or destroyed.
148	The Royal Four-Flusher	September 12	Seymour Kneitel	Tom Johnson; Frank Endres	Tom Ford	Joe Stultz; Carl Meyer
Although uncredited, Jim Tyer worked on this short
149	Wotta Knight	October 24	Isadore Sparber	Tom Johnson; John Gentilella	Anton Loeb	I. Klein; Carl Meyer
Although uncredited, this is the last Popeye cartoon on which animator Jim Tyer worked on before leaving to join the Terrytoons studio.; Some TV versions are edited to remove a Black stereotype and Bluto in blackface.; King Little from the Fleischer Studios film Gulliver's Travels appears as the jousting announcer.; Final entry of the 1946-47 film season.
150	Safari So Good	November 7	Isadore Sparber	Tom Johnson; Morey Reden	Anton Loeb	Larz Bourne
First entry of the 1947-48 film season.
151	All's Fair at the Fair	December 19	Seymour Kneitel	Dave Tendlar; Martin Taras	Robert Connavale	I. Klein; Jack Ward
Produced in Cinecolor; Dave Tendlar's animation crew got the credit for animation, but this cartoon was actually animated by Tom Johnson's crew.; Original Paramount version restored and distributed by Turner
=== 1948 ===
#	Film	Original release date	Directed by	Animated by	Scenics by	Story by
152	Olive Oyl for President	January 30	Isadore Sparber	Tom Johnson; John Gentilella; Els Barthen	Tom Ford	Joe Stultz; Larry Riley
Additional Voices are provided by Sid Raymond; Final Popeye cartoon produced in Cinecolor; Color remake of the Fleischer Studios short Betty Boop for President; Little Audrey makes a cameo appearance in Popeye's unconscious dream sequence. This is the second appearance she has been in a Famous Studios cartoon, the first being the Noveltoon Santa's Surprise. She later appeared in more Noveltoons, billed as her own cartoon series. Prior to that scene, the dog who appears in this cartoon is the same dog that appears in the final Little Lulu cartoon, The Dog Show-Off. Both cartoons were double feature.; The ending music for most a.a.p.-distributed Famous Studios Popeye shorts was sourced from this cartoon.; Original Paramount version restored and distributed by Turner
153	Wigwam Whoopee	February 27	Isadore Sparber	Tom Johnson; William Henning	Robert Connavale	I. Klein; Jack Mercer
The first Popeye cartoon produced in Polacolor; Original Paramount titles restored and distributed by Turner; Doesn't air on American television outside of any scheduled airings on The Popeye Show because of Native American stereotyping, Olive Oyl’s transracial appearance, and other inappropriate themes.
154	Pre-Hysterical Man	March 26	Seymour Kneitel	Dave Tendlar; Morey Reden	Anton Loeb	Carl Meyer; Jack Mercer
Produced in Polacolor; Opening titles revised to shorten the "Sailor's Hornpipe" portion of the theme
155	Popeye Meets Hercules	June 18	Bill Tytla	George Germanetti; Tom Moore	Robert Connavale	I. Klein
Produced in Polacolor; Clouds added behind the Paramount mountain in the titles; Original titles were retained in a.a.p. TV syndication print
156	A Wolf in Sheik's Clothing	July 30	Isadore Sparber	Tom Johnson; George Rufle	Tom Ford	Larry Riley; I. Klein
Produced in Polacolor; Original titles were retained in a.a.p. TV syndication print
157	Spinach vs Hamburgers	August 27	Seymour Kneitel	Al Eugster; Tom Moore	Tom Ford	Bill Turner; Larz Bourne
Compilation film, uses clips (with original soundtracks) from The Anvil Chorus Girl, Pop-Pie a La Mode and She-Sick Sailors; Some TV versions are edited to remove the clip from Pop-Pie a La Mode, which is no longer aired in America.; Bluto only appears in two of the archival clips.; Although not appearing in person, this is Wimpy's first mention since 1940's Onion Pacific.
158	Snow Place Like Home	September 3	Seymour Kneitel	Dave Tendlar; Martin Taras	Anton Loeb	Carl Meyer; Jack Mercer
Produced in Polacolor; Final entry of the 1947-48 film season.
159	Robin Hood-Winked	November 12	Seymour Kneitel	Tom Johnson; Frank Endres	Robert Little	Larz Bourne; Tom Golden
Produced in Polacolor; Original Paramount version restored and distributed by Turner; A parody of Robin Hood; First entry of the 1948-49 film season.
160	Symphony in Spinach	December 31	Seymour Kneitel	Tom Johnson; John Gentilella	Robert Connavale	Bill Turner; Larry Riley
Produced in Polacolor; Original Paramount version restored and distributed by Turner
=== 1949 ===
#	Film	Original release date	Directed by	Animated by	Scenics by	Story by
161	Popeye's Premiere	March 25	Seymour Kneitel (uncredited); Dave Fleischer (uncredited, archival)	Dave Tendlar; John Gentilella	Lloyd Hallock, Jr. (uncredited)	Bill Turner; I. Klein
Compilation film, mostly reused footage from the Fleischer two-reeler Aladdin and His Wonderful Lamp with new wrap-around animation and a new soundtrack
162	Lumberjack and Jill	May 27	Seymour Kneitel	Tom Johnson; George Rufle	Tom Ford	Carl Meyer; Jack Mercer
Produced in Polacolor
163	Hot Air Aces	June 24	Isadore Sparber	Al Eugster; Bill Hudson	Robert Connavale	I. Klein
Final Popeye cartoon produced in Polacolor
164	A Balmy Swami	July 22	Isadore Sparber	Tom Johnson; George Rufle	Anton Loeb	Carl Meyer; Jack Mercer
All cartoons produced in Technicolor from now on; A color remake of the Fleischer short The "Hyp-Nut-Tist"; A similar setting from Popeye's Premiere appears in this cartoon.
165	Tar with a Star	August 12	Bill Tytla	George Germanetti; Steve Muffatti	TBA	Carl Meyer; Jack Mercer
166	Silly Hillbilly	September 9	Isadore Sparber	Tom Johnson; Frank Endres	Robert Little	I. Klein
Final entry of the 1948-49 film season.
167	Barking Dogs Don't Fite	October 28	Isadore Sparber	Tom Johnson; John Gentilella	Tom Ford	Carl Meyer; Jack Mercer
Third of four cartoons where Popeye's sailor outfit is blue; A color remake of the Fleischer Studios short Protek the Weakerist; First entry of the 1949-50 film season.
168	The Fly's Last Flight	December 23	Seymour Kneitel	Tom Johnson; Frank Endres	Tom Ford	Larz Bourne
A color remake of the Fleischer short Flies Ain't Human; Final Popeye and Famous Studios cartoon released in the 1940s; As of 2026, this is the final Popeye the Sailor cartoon officially restored and released on DVD and Blu-Ray.
=== 1950 ===
#	Film	Original release date	Directed by	Animated by	Scenics by	Story by
169	How Green Is My Spinach	January 27	Seymour Kneitel	Tom Johnson; William Henning	Lloyd Hallock, Jr.	Izzy Klein
Live-Action (Black & White) & Animation (Color) Hybrid; Narrated by Jackson Beck; Jackson Beck also voices Bluto and TV Newscaster; Cecil Roy voices Boy in Movie Theater; Tom Ewell appears on-screen as Man in Audience; First Popeye cartoon released in the 1950s
170	Gym Jam	March 17	I. Sparber	Tom Johnson; John Gentilella	Anton Loeb	Carl Meyer; Jack Mercer
Mae Questel voices Olive Oyl; Jackson Beck voices Bluto; Color remake of the Fleischer Studios short Vim, Vigor and Vitaliky
171	Beach Peach	May 12	Seymour Kneitel	Tom Johnson; Frank Endres; Els Barthen	Tom Ford	Larz Bourne; Larry Riley
Mae Questel voices Olive Oyl; Jackson Beck voices Life Guard
172	Jitterbug Jive	June 23	Bill Tytla	George Germanetti; Harvey Patterson	Lloyd Hallock, Jr.	Carl Meyer; Jack Mercer
Final cartoon directed by Bill Tytla
173	Popeye Makes a Movie	August 11	Seymour Kneitel; Dave Fleischer (uncredited, archival)	Tom Johnson; George Rufle; Els Barthen	Robert Little	I. Klein
All Other Voices are provided by Jack Mercer; Mae Questel voices Olive Oyl; Jackson Beck voices Abu Hassan; Sid Raymond voices Ali, Third Thief; Compilation film, mostly reused footage from the Fleischer two-reeler Popeye the Sailor Meets Ali Baba's Forty Thieves with new wraparound animation and dubbing voices; First film appearance of Wimpy since 1940's Onion Pacific, and by extension, his first appearance in the Famous Studios series; One of two Famous cartoons where Popeye appears in his comic strip uniform
174	Baby Wants Spinach	September 29	Seymour Kneitel	Al Eugster; Wm. B. Pattengill	Robert Owen	Carl Meyer; Jack Mercer
First film appearance of Swee'Pea since 1942's Baby Wants a Bottleship. Swee'Pea's appearance was redesigned.; A color remake of the Fleischer Studios short With Little Swee'Pea
175	Quick on the Vigor	October 6	Seymour Kneitel	Tom Johnson; John Gentilella	Robert Owen	Carl Meyer; Jack Mercer
176	Riot in Rhythm	November 10	Seymour Kneitel	Tom Johnson; William Henning	Tom Ford	Seymour Kneitel
Color shot-for-shot remake of Me Musical Nephews; Fourth and final cartoon where Popeye's sailor outfit is blue; The ending gag is cut from a.a.p. prints due to the involvement of the Paramount logo
177	The Farmer and the Belle	December 1	Seymour Kneitel	Tom Johnson; Frank Endres	Robert Little	Joe Stultz
=== 1951 ===
#	Film	Original release date	Directed by	Animated by	Scenics by	Story by
178	Vacation with Play	January 19	Seymour Kneitel	Tom Johnson; John Gentilella	Tom Ford	Carl Meyer; Jack Mercer
179	Thrill of Fair	April 20	Seymour Kneitel	Tom Johnson; John Gentilella	Tom Ford	Carl Meyer; Jack Mercer
180	Alpine for You	May 18	Isadore Sparber	Steve Muffatti; George Germanetti	Robert Connavale	Carl Meyer; Jack Mercer
The ending gag is cut from a.a.p. prints due to the involvement of the Paramount logo; Original Paramount version restored and distributed by Turner; Semi-remake of the Fleischer short I-Ski Love-Ski You-Ski; Popeye permanently gains teeth from here on out.
181	Double-Cross-Country Race	June 15	Seymour Kneitel	Tom Johnson; Bill Hudson	Anton Loeb	Larz Bourne
182	Pilgrim Popeye	July 13	Isadore Sparber	Al Eugster; George Germanetti	Anton Loeb	Carl Meyer; Jack Mercer
Timothy Turkey makes a guest appearance
183	Let's Stalk Spinach	October 19	Seymour Kneitel	Steve Muffatti; George Germanetti	Anton Loeb	I. Klein
Alternated rendition of the Popeye theme is utilized; this version would be used for all remaining Popeye theatricals
184	Punch and Judo	November 16	Isadore Sparber	Tom Johnson; Frank Endres	Robert Connavale	Irving Spector
Some TV versions are edited to remove a Black stereotype
=== 1952 ===
#	Film	Original release date	Directed by	Animated by	Scenics by	Story by
185	Popeye's Pappy	January 25	Isadore Sparber	Tom Johnson; Frank Endres	Robert Little	Larz Bourne
Poopdeck Pappy's first film appearance since 1941's Pest Pilot. This is the first of three appearances he would make in the Famous shorts.; Semi-remake of the Fleischer Studios short Goonland; No longer shown on American television due to Black African native stereotyping
186	Lunch with a Punch	March 14	Isadore Sparber	Al Eugster; George Germanetti	Tom Ford	Carl Meyer; Jack Mercer
187	Swimmer Take All	May 16	Seymour Kneitel	Tom Johnson; John Gentilella	Robert Little	Carl Meyer; Jack Mercer
188	Friend or Phony	June 20	Isadore Sparber	Al Eugster; George Germanetti	Robert Owen	Irving Spector
Reused footage from Tar with a Star and I'll Be Skiing Ya
189	Tots of Fun	August 15	Seymour Kneitel	Tom Johnson; Frank Endres	Robert Owen	Larz Bourne
190	Popalong Popeye	August 29	Seymour Kneitel	Tom Johnson; John Gentilella	John Zago	Carl Meyer; Jack Mercer
191	Shuteye Popeye	October 3	Isadore Sparber	Al Eugster; George Germanetti	Robert Connavale	Irving Spector
The mouse is voiced by Isadore Sparber.; In the public domain in the United States
192	Big Bad Sindbad	December 12	Seymour Kneitel; Dave Fleischer (uncredited, archival)	Tom Johnson; William Henning	Robert Connavale	I. Klein
Mostly reused footage from the Fleischer two-reeler Popeye the Sailor Meets Sindbad the Sailor with new wraparound animation and a new soundtrack; In the public domain in the United States; A restored original print is available on some PD compilations; Second of two Famous cartoons where Popeye appears in his comic strip uniform; Final cartoon directed by Dave Fleischer
=== 1953 ===
#	Film	Original release date	Directed by	Animated by	Scenics by	Story by
193	Ancient Fistory	January 30	Seymour Kneitel	Al Eugster; Wm. B. Pattengill	Robert Connavale	Irving Spector
Poopdeck Pappy's second appearance in a Famous cartoon. This time he appears as Popeye's fairy godfather.; In the public domain in the United States; A parody of the fairy tale Cinderella
194	Child Sockology	March 27	Isadore Sparber	Tom Johnson; Frank Endres	Robert Little	Carl Meyer; Jack Mercer
195	Popeye's Mirthday	May 22	Seymour Kneitel	Tom Johnson; Frank Endres	Robert Connavale	Carl Meyer; Jack Mercer
196	Toreadorable	June 12	Seymour Kneitel	Tom Johnson; John Gentilella	Anton Loeb	Carl Meyer; Jack Mercer
197	Baby Wants a Battle	July 24	Seymour Kneitel	Al Eugster; George Germanetti	Robert Connavale	Carl Meyer; Jack Mercer
The final appearance of Poopdeck Pappy in a Famous cartoon. This time, he is a younger version in a flashback sequence
198	Firemen's Brawl	August 21	Isadore Sparber	Tom Johnson; Frank Endres	Robert Connavale	Carl Meyer; Jack Mercer
A color remake of the Fleischer Studios short The Two-Alarm Fire
199	Popeye, the Ace of Space	October 2	Seymour Kneitel	Al Eugster; George Germanetti; Wm. B. Pattengill	Robert Little; Anton Loeb	Carl Meyer; Jack Mercer
Originally made in 3D; a fully restored 3D print is in circulation for screening at 3D film events; One of two Paramount cartoons filmed in 3D, the other being the Casper cartoon Boo Moon.; The ending gag is cut from a.a.p. prints due to the use of the Paramount logo; A print with original titles aired on The Popeye Show; A semi-remake of Rocket to Mars
200	Shaving Muggs	October 9	Seymour Kneitel	Tom Johnson; John Gentilella	Anton Loeb	Larz Bourne
A color remake of the Fleischer Studios short A Clean Shaven Man; 200th Popeye cartoon.
=== 1954 ===
#	Film	Original release date	Directed by	Animated by	Scenics by	Story by
201	Floor Flusher	January 1	Isadore Sparber	Tom Golden; Bill Hudson	Robert Owen	Carl Meyer; Jack Mercer
In the public domain in the United States; Semi-remake of the Fleischer short Plumbin is a 'Pipe'; Copyright is marked as 1953 on the title card, due to this cartoon being released on New Year's Day in 1954.
202	Popeye's 20th Anniversary	April 2	Isadore Sparber	Al Eugster; George Germanetti	Joseph Dommerque	I. Klein
Reused footage from Tops in the Big Top and Rodeo Romeo; In the public domain in the United States
203	Taxi-Turvy	June 4	Seymour Kneitel	Tom Johnson; Frank Endres	Robert Owen	Irving Spector
In the public domain in the United States; Some restored versions on public domain DVDs use the original soundtrack.
204	Bride and Gloom	July 2	Isadore Sparber	Tom Johnson; John Gentilella	Robert Connavale	Larz Bourne
Semi-remake of the Fleischer Studios short Wimmin Is a Myskery; In the public domain in the United States
205	Greek Mirthology	August 13	Seymour Kneitel	Tom Golden; George Germanetti	Anton Loeb	I. Klein
In the public domain in the United States
206	Fright to the Finish	August 27	Seymour Kneitel	Al Eugster; Wm. B. Pattengill	Robert Connavale	Jack Mercer
Semi-remake of the Fleischer short Ghosks is the Bunk; In the public domain in the United States
207	Private Eye Popeye	November 12	Seymour Kneitel	Tom Johnson; Frank Endres	Anton Loeb	I. Klein
In the public domain in the United States; Final entry of the 1953-54 film season.
208	Gopher Spinach	December 10	Seymour Kneitel	Tom Johnson; John Gentilella	Robert Connavale	Carl Meyer
In the public domain in the United States; To make the film's title safe for emerging widescreen theatres, the Paramount mountain was completely redrawn for this cartoon. Along with other Famous Studios cartoons after Herman and Katnip's Rail-Rodents, the new logo remains permanent for all remaining shorts to the end of the series.; First entry of the 1954-55 film season.
=== 1955 ===
#	Film	Original release date	Directed by	Animated by	Scenics by	Story by
209	Cookin' with Gags	January 14	Isadore Sparber	Tom Johnson; William Henning	Anton Loeb	Carl Meyer
In the public domain in the United States; a.a.p. print mistakenly leaves in Famous Studios credit with the Paramount logo in the background.
210	Nurse to Meet Ya	February 11	Isadore Sparber	Al Eugster; Wm. B. Pattengill	Robert Connavale	Jack Mercer
Last film appearance of Swee'Pea
211	Penny Antics	March 11	Seymour Kneitel	Tom Johnson; Frank Endres	Robert Connavale	I. Klein
Semi-remake of the Fleischer Studios short Customers Wanted; Reused footage from Silly Hillbilly, Wotta Knight, and The Fistic Mystic; Some TV versions are edited to remove Black stereotypes that originally appeared in the reused footage from Wotta Knight
212	Beaus Will Be Beaus	May 20	Isadore Sparber	Tom Johnson; John Gentilella	Robert Little	I. Klein
213	Gift of Gag	May 27	Seymour Kneitel	Tom Johnson; Frank Endres	Robert Connavale	I. Klein
214	Car-azy Drivers	July 22	Seymour Kneitel	Tom Johnson; John Gentilella	Anton Loeb	Larz Bourne
Color remake of the Fleischer Studios short Wimmin Hadn't Oughta Drive; The last cartoon produced before the cartoons were sold to a.a.p. for television. All following entries only exist with original titles; Final entry of the 1954-55 film season.
215	Mister and Mistletoe	September 30	Isadore Sparber	Al Eugster; Wm. B. Pattengill	Joseph Dommerque	Jack Mercer
First entry of the 1955-56 film season.; From this entry onward, all remaining Popeye shorts retain their original Paramount titles
216	Cops Is Tops	November 4	Isadore Sparber	Tom Johnson; Frank Endres	Anton Loeb	Carl Meyer
217	A Job for a Gob	December 9	Seymour Kneitel	Al Eugster; George Germanetti	Robert Connavale	Larz Bourne
=== 1956 ===
#	Film	Original release date	Directed by	Animated by	Scenics by	Story by
218	Hill-billing and Cooing	January 13	Seymour Kneitel	Tom Johnson; John Gentilella	Robert Connavale	Jack Mercer
Latest Popeye short still under copyright in the United States. All remaining shorts to the end of the series are in the public domain; This cartoon was a role-reversal, in which Olive Oyl was the protagonist who had to rescue Popeye.
219	Popeye for President	March 30	Seymour Kneitel	Tom Johnson; Frank Endres	Robert Connavale	Jack Mercer
220	Out to Punch	June 8	Seymour Kneitel	Tom Johnson; John Gentilella	John Zago	Carl Meyer
A semi-remake of Punch and Judo
221	Assault and Flattery	July 6	Isadore Sparber	Al Eugster; Wm. B. Pattengill	Joseph Dommerque	I. Klein
Reused footage from The Farmer and the Belle, How Green Is My Spinach, and A Balmy Swami
222	Insect to Injury	August 10	Dave Tendlar	Morey Reden; Thomas Moore	Anton Loeb	I. Klein
The only Popeye cartoon to be directed by Dave Tendlar; Final entry of the 1955-56 film season.; In the public domain in the United States
223	Parlez Vous Woo	October 12	Isadore Sparber	Al Eugster; Wm. B. Pattengill	Anton Loeb	I. Klein
First entry of the 1956-57 film season.
224	I Don't Scare	November 16	Isadore Sparber	Tom Johnson; Frank Endres	Robert Owen	Jack Mercer
225	A Haul in One	December 14	Isadore Sparber	Al Eugster; Wm. B. Pattengill	Robert Owen	Larz Bourne
Color remake of the Fleischer Studios short Let's Get Movin'
=== 1957 ===
#	Film	Original release date	Directed by	Animated by	Scenics by	Story by
226	Nearlyweds	February 8	Seymour Kneitel	Tom Johnson; Frank Endres	John Zago	I. Klein
Last Popeye cartoon to bear the name "Famous Studios" in the credits before the studio changed its name to Paramount Cartoon Studios.
227	The Crystal Brawl	April 5	Seymour Kneitel	Al Eugster; Wm. B. Pattengill	Joe Dommerque	Carl Meyer
Reused footage from Alpine for You and Quick on the Vigor; First Popeye cartoon released under Paramount Cartoon Studios
228	Patriotic Popeye	May 10	Isadore Sparber	Tom Johnson; Frank Endres	Robert Owen	Carl Meyer
Final theatrical film appearance of Popeye's nephews
229	Spree Lunch	June 21	Seymour Kneitel	Tom Johnson; Frank Endres	Joe Dommerque	Jack Mercer
Final theatrical film appearances of Bluto and Wimpy; In the public domain in the United States
230	Spooky Swabs	August 9	Isadore Sparber	Tom Johnson; Frank Endres	John Zago	Larz Bourne
Final theatrical film appearances of Popeye and Olive Oyl; Some of the ghosts from Casper the Friendly Ghost appear in this cartoon.; Semi-remake of Shiver Me Timbers!; Final cartoon directed by Isadore Sparber; Final entry of the 1956-57 film season.
