= Pop-Pie a la Mode =

- Directed by: I. Sparber; Animation Director: Joe Oriolo (uncredited)
- Story by: Dave Tendlar
- Produced by: Seymour Kneitel; I.Sparber; Executive Producer; Sam Buchward (all uncredited)
- Starring: Jack Mercer (uncredited); Jackson Beck (uncredited)
- Music by: Winston Sharples (uncredited)
- Animation by: Joe Oriolo; Morey Reden; Uncredited Animation: John Gentilella
- Color process: Technicolor
- Production company: Famous Studios
- Distributed by: Paramount Pictures
- Release date: January 26, 1945 (US)
- Country: United States
- Language: English

Pop-Pie a la Mode is a 1945 Popeye theatrical cartoon short, starring Jack Mercer as Popeye. Produced by Famous Studios and directed by Isadore Sparber, it was the 132nd cartoon in the Popeye series of theatrical cartoons released by Paramount Pictures.

The cartoon has been criticized for its racist depictions of African Americans.

== Plot ==
Popeye, shipwrecked and riding a small raft, is overjoyed to come across a tropical island where Joe's Always Inn stands. He is received by Joe himself, who is in fact the king of the island's cannibal tribe. Seeing the delectable newcomer makes him visualize a meaty dish and, after Popeye is given service, Joe turns to his cookbook for ideas. To fatten him, he has the sailor rest comfortably on a hammock while being served various types of potato and starchy sweets. When a little cannibal tries to sandwich one of the guest's legs, Joe turns him away. Later, Joe says to Popeye he is to be initiated into the Secret Order of the Midnight Well.

The ceremony involves Popeye taking a hot tub bath in the island clearing, at night. Drums sounding, Popeye enters the tub – which is soon dismantled to reveal he is really in a large cauldron. After the young cannibal makes another sandwich out of Popeye's meaty arm, and takes a bite this time, the hero acknowledges his predicament as he sees every native is holding a meat ration book and looking at him hungrily. It takes a horde of natives to overcome Popeye's resistance. They then proceed to flatten him into the shape of a juicy steak ready to be grilled. The sailor-steak manages to get out and eat his spinach, promptly defeating all the tribesmen then going after Joe, who takes shelter in a building from which he shoots many cannons at the hero. Popeye turns his own projectiles against him, however. Joe is sent flying to the water, where two hungry sharks await, only he is hungrier and chases them over the sea. Popeye becomes the tribe's new king, although he has to put up with the boy cannibal trying a Popeye-leg sandwich once again.

== Availability/Censorship ==
The short has not been shown on broadcast television for decades, due to the portrayal of the island natives/cannibals, although the cartoon Spinach vs Hamburgers shows clips from this cartoon. This short is on the Popeye the Sailor: The 1940s, Volume 1 Blu-ray/DVD set released by Warner Archive Collection on December 11, 2018. It is not on the streaming release of the collection.

== See also ==
- Popeye the Sailor filmography (Famous Studios)
