= Popeye the Sailor Meets Ali Baba's Forty Thieves =

- Directed by: Dave Fleischer; Animation Direction: Willard Bowsky (uncredited)
- Story by: I. Sparber; Seymour Kneitel; Bill Turner; Jack Ward (all uncredited)
- Based on: Ali Baba and the Forty Thieves
- Produced by: Max Fleischer; Adolph Zukor
- Starring: Jack Mercer; Mae Questel; Gus Wickie; Lou Fleischer
- Music by: Sammy Timberg; Sammy Lerner; Abu Hassan Song: Tot Seymour (lyricist); Vee Lawnhurst (composer)
- Animation by: Willard Bowsky; George Germanetti; Orestes Calpini; Uncredited Animation: George Sheehan; Lillian Friedman
- Backgrounds by: Robert Little (uncredited)
- Color process: Technicolor
- Production company: Fleischer Studios
- Distributed by: Paramount Pictures
- Release date: November 26, 1937
- Running time: 17:15
- Country: United States
- Language: English

Popeye the Sailor Meets Ali Baba's Forty Thieves is a two-reel animated cartoon short subject in the Popeye Color Specials series, produced in Technicolor and released to theatres on November 26, 1937 by Paramount Pictures. It was produced by Max Fleischer for Fleischer Studios, Inc. and directed by Dave Fleischer. Willard Bowsky was head animator, with musical supervision by Sammy Timberg. The voice of Popeye is performed by Jack Mercer, with additional voices by Mae Questel as Olive Oyl, Lou Fleischer as J. Wellington Wimpy and Gus Wickie as Abu Hassan.

== Plot ==
Full film

While on guard at a Coast Guard post, Popeye, Olive Oyl and Wimpy hear of Abu Hassan's attack on a town in Arabia and fly there in their flying boat to capture him, but they crash as they are flying over the Arabian desert. After trekking through the desert, the group happens upon the town where the Forty Thieves are routinely attacking. The Thieves arrive in town soon afterwards, and their leader Abu Hassan, who closely resembles Popeye's old nemesis Bluto, gets frustrated after failing to win a battle of one-upmanship with Popeye (during which, demonstrating a magic trick, Popeye relieves Hassan of his long underwear, remarking "Abu hasn't got 'em any more!"). Hassan finally leaves Popeye hanging from a chandelier, then orders his Thieves to swipe everything they can from the town before fleeing, including Olive and Wimpy. Popeye eventually manages to break free and takes a camel to Abu's secret cave, where, unable to remember the magic word of "open sesame!", he breaks in using his pipe as a blowtorch.

Inside the cave, Popeye sneaks past the guards and attempts to free Olive and Wimpy. He confronts Abu Hassan and demands that he gives the Forty Thieves' stolen jewels back to the people. However, he is apprehended and thrown into a killer whale pit. Just before being eaten by a killer whale, Popeye tangles the killer whale's teeth together, and the killer whale goes back down into the water. Popeye eats his spinach (using the phrase "Open says me" to open the can's lid), and escapes the killer whale pit to fight Abu Hassan and all forty of the Thieves. He finally defeats the Forty Thieves by constantly punching them (counting every single one as he does so), before throwing and locking Hassan in a treasure chest.

The Thieves and Hassan are chained and made to drag a cart filled with the stolen loot, Popeye, Olive, and Wimpy, back to town, where the townspeople, jubilant at their liberation from Hassan's reign of terror, await them with open arms. As Popeye puts it, "I may be a shorty, but I licked the Forty! I'm Popeye the Sailor Man!"

== Release and reception ==
Popeye the Sailor Meets Ali Baba's Forty Thieves was produced while Fleischer competitor Walt Disney was entering the final months of production on his first animated feature, Snow White and the Seven Dwarfs. It made full use of Fleischer Studios' multiplane camera, which they had been experimenting with for some time. Disney had just released his Academy Award-winning Silly Symphony, The Old Mill, their first 3-D cartoon, and were advertising their upcoming Snow White as multiplanal as well. As such, advertising for "Forty Thieves" accented the fact that it was 3-dimensional. It was released just weeks before the seasonal Los Angeles premiere of Snow White and was essentially the only animated competition for the feature.

The short was the second of the three Popeye "Color Specials," which were over seventeen minutes each, three times as long as a regular Popeye cartoon, and were often billed in theatres alongside or above the main feature. Today, this short and the other two Popeye Color Specials, Popeye the Sailor Meets Sindbad the Sailor, and Aladdin and His Wonderful Lamp (both of which were also adapted from a story featured in One Thousand and One Nights), are in the public domain. Poor quality transfers of these three cartoons made from old, faded prints have been released on several previous Popeye collections on VHS tape and DVD. The cartoon, fully restored with the original Paramount mountain intro opening and closing titles, is available officially on disc four of Popeye the Sailor: 1933–1938, Volume 1.
