= Popeye the Sailor (film series) =

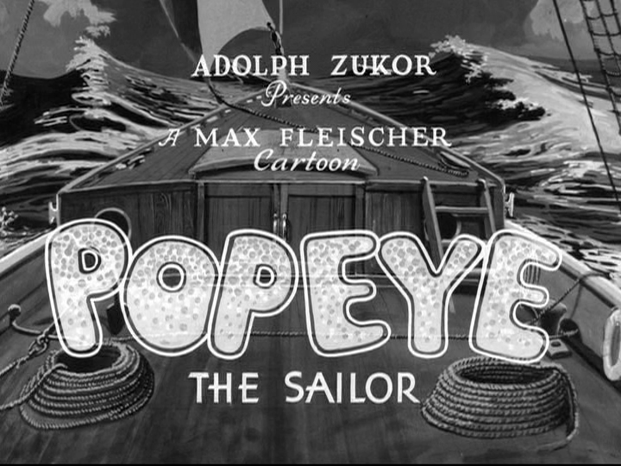
- Popeye the Sailor opening title used in the 1930s
- Directed by: Dave Fleischer; Dan Gordon; I. Sparber; Seymour Kneitel; Bill Tytla; Dave Tendlar
- Story by: George Manuell; Seymour Kneitel; Bill Turner; Warren Foster; Dan Gordon; Tedd Pierce; Milford Davis; Eric St. Clair; Cal Howard; Jack Mercer; Carl Meyer; Jack Ward; Joe Stultz; Otto Messmer; Dave Tendlar; Irving Dressler; I. Klein; Woody Gelman; Larry Riley; Larz Bourne; Irv Spector; George Hill; James Tyer; Izzy Sparber
- Based on: Popeye by E. C. Segar
- Produced by: Adolph Zukor
- Animation by: Seymour Kneitel; Roland Crandall; William Henning; William Sturm; Willard Bowsky; Dave Tendlar; Myron Waldman; Thomas Johnson; Nick Tafuri; Harold Walker; Charles Hastings; George Germanetti; Orestes Calpini; Edward Nolan; Frank Endres; Robert G. Leffingwell; Jack Ozark; Lillian Friedman; James Davis; Joe D'Igalo; Graham Place; Robert Bentley; Tom Golden; Shamus Culhane; A. Arnold Gillespie; Abner Kneitel; Winfield Hoskins; Grim Natwick; Irv Spector; Myron Waldman; Sidney Pillet; Lod Rossner; Bill Nolan; Joe Oriolo; Tom Baron; Ruben Grossman; John Walworth; Al Eugster; James Tyer; Ben Solomon; Morey Reden; John Gentilella; Lou Zukor; Martin Taras; George Rufle; Bill Hudson; Harvey Patterson; Wm. B. Pattengill; Steve Muffatti; Hicks Lokey; Howard Swift; Jack Ehret (assistant animator)
- Color process: Black-and-white (1933–1943); 3-strip Technicolor (1936, 1937, 1939, 1943–1946, 1949–1957); 2-strip Cinecolor (1946–1948); 3-strip Polacolor (1948–1949)
- Production companies: Fleischer Studios (1933–1942); Famous Studios (renamed as Paramount Cartoon Studios) (1942–1957)
- Distributed by: Paramount Pictures (1933–1957); Associated Artists Productions (1956–1958); United Artists (1958–1982); Metro-Goldwyn-Mayer (1982–1986); Turner Entertainment Co. (1986–present)
- Running time: 6–10 minutes (one reel); 15–20 minutes (two reel) (Popeye the Sailor Meets Sindbad the Sailor, Popeye the Sailor Meets Ali Baba's Forty Thieves and Aladdin and His Wonderful Lamp)
- Country: United States
- Language: English

Popeye the Sailor is an American animated series of short films based on the Popeye comic strip character created by E. C. Segar. In 1933, Max and Dave Fleischer's Fleischer Studios, based in New York City, adapted Segar's characters into a series of theatrical cartoon shorts for Paramount Pictures. The plotlines in the animated cartoons tended to be simpler than those presented in the comic strips, and the characters slightly different. A villain, usually Bluto, makes a move on Popeye's "sweetie", Olive Oyl. The villain clobbers Popeye until he eats spinach, giving him superhuman strength. Thus empowered, Popeye makes short work of the villain.

The Fleischer Popeye cartoons proved to be among the most popular of the 1930s, and would remain a staple of Paramount's release schedule for nearly 25 years. Paramount would take control of the studio in 1941 and rename it Famous Studios, ousting the Fleischer brothers and continuing production. The theatrical Popeye cartoons began airing on television in 1956, and the Popeye theatrical series was discontinued in 1957. Popeye the Sailor in all produced 231 short subjects that were broadcast on television for several years.

The 1930s Popeye cartoons have been said by historians to have an urban feel, with the Fleischers pioneering an East Coast animation scene that differed highly from their West Coast counterparts.

== Early history ==
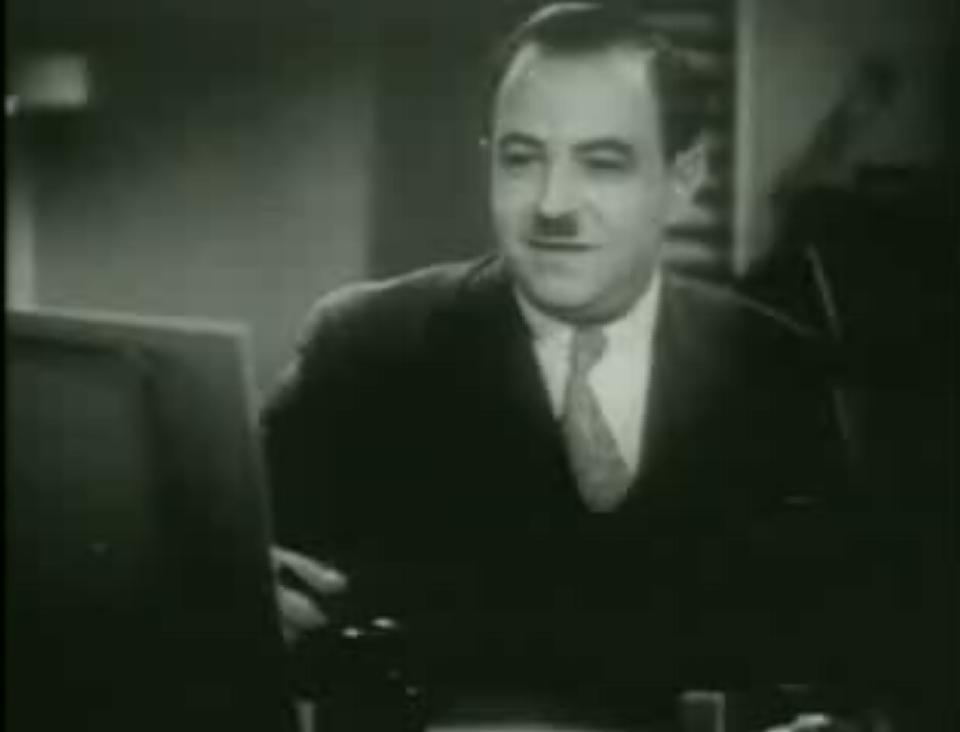
Max Fleischer

Popeye the Sailor, created by E.C. Segar, debuted in 1929 in his King Features Syndicate-distributed comic strip, Thimble Theatre. The character was growing in popularity by the 1930s and there was "hardly a newspaper reader of the Great Depression that did not know his name." In November 1932, King Features signed an agreement with Fleischer Studios, run by producer Max Fleischer and his brother, director Dave Fleischer, to have Popeye and the other Thimble Theatre characters begin appearing in a series of animated cartoons released by Paramount Pictures. The first cartoon in the series was released in 1933, and Popeye cartoons would remain a staple of Paramount's release schedule for nearly 25 years.

One source of inspiration for the Fleischers were newspapers and comic strips, and they saw potential in Popeye as an animated star, thinking the humor would translate well onscreen. When the Fleischers needed more characters, they turned to Segar's strip: Wimpy debuted in the first regular Popeye cartoon, Swee'Pea, Poopdeck Pappy, the Goons, and Eugene the Jeep arrived onscreen by the late 1930s. Popeye was also given more family exclusive to the shorts, specifically his look-alike nephews Pipeye, Peepeye, Pupeye, and Poopeye. Spinach became a main component of the Popeye cartoons and was used for the energetic finale in each of them. Eventually, the Fleischers paired Popeye and spinach together far more than Segar ever did. In 1934, a statistic was released noting that spinach sales had increased 33% since the creation of the Popeye cartoons. Segar received crates of spinach at his home because of the Popeye association. The huge child following Popeye received eventually prompted Segar's boss, William Randolph Hearst, to order Segar to tone down the humor and violence. Segar was not ready to compromise, believing there would be "nothing funny about a sissy sailor."

== Voice cast ==
Many voice artists worked on the Popeye shorts over the two decades of production; this list is based on the most comprehensive artists.

- William "Billy" Costello, Jack Mercer as Popeye the Sailor (substitutes: Floyd Buckley, Harry Foster Welch, Mae Questel). Costello had a gruff, gravelly quality in voicing the character. It is generally thought that Costello became difficult to work with after becoming overly confident from the success of the first few cartoons. Jack Mercer was working in the in-between department of Fleischer Studios doing imitations of Costello, and, after practicing at home for a week, replaced Costello as the voice of Popeye beginning with King of the Mardi Gras (1935). Historians believe the character came into his own when Mercer became the voice artist, employing more flexible acting and emotion into the character. Mercer voiced the character until his death in 1984. Mae Questel, Floyd Buckley and Harry Welch substituted in several wartime cartoons, when Mercer left to serve in World War II.
- Bonnie Poe, Mae Questel, Margie Hines as Olive Oyl. Questel was the voice of Betty Boop when she was brought in early on to play Olive Oyl, and she based the character voice on ZaSu Pitts. Questel voiced Olive Oyl until 1938, when Fleischer operations shifted to Florida. Hines, who was Mercer's wife, voiced the character until 1943. Paramount moved the studio back to New York the following year and Questel reassured voice acting duties until the series' end in 1957.
- William Pennell, Gus Wickie and Jackson Beck as Bluto (substitutes: Dave Barry, Jack Mercer, Pinto Colvig, Tedd Pierce). William Pennell was the first to voice the Bluto character from 1933 to 1935's The Hyp-Nut-Tist. Gus Wickie is generally considered the most memorable voice actor by fans and historians. Wickie voiced Bluto until Fleischer left New York in 1938, his last work being the voice of the "Chief" in Big Chief Ugh-A-Mug-Ugh. Several other actors were employed to voice Bluto from then on (including Mercer, Pierce, Colvig and Barry). When Famous Studios took over production and moved back to New York City, Jackson Beck took over the role until 1962.

== Fleischer Studios ==
Popeye made his film debut in Popeye the Sailor, a 1933 Betty Boop cartoon. Although Betty Boop herself has a small cameo appearance, the cartoon mostly introduces the main characters: Popeye's coming to rescue Olive Oyl after being kidnapped by Bluto. The triangle between Popeye, Olive and Bluto was set up from the beginning and soon became the template for most Popeye productions that would follow. The cartoon opens with a newspaper headline announcing Popeye as a movie star, reflecting the transition into film. I Yam What I Yam became the first entry in the regular Popeye the Sailor series.

Thanks to the animated shorts, Popeye became even more of a sensation than he had been in comic strips. As Betty Boop gradually declined in popularity as a result of Hays Code censorship undermining her characterization in 1934, Popeye became the studio's star character by 1936. Popeye began to sell more tickets and became the most popular cartoon character in the country in the 1930s, surpassing Mickey Mouse. Paramount added to Popeye's profile by sponsoring the "Popeye Club" as part of their Saturday matinée program, in competition with Mickey Mouse Clubs. Popeye cartoons, including a sing-along special entitled Let's Sing with Popeye, were a regular part of the weekly meetings. For a 10-cent membership fee, club members were given a Popeye kazoo, a membership card, the chance to become elected as the Club's "Popeye" or "Olive Oyl", and the opportunity to win other gifts. Polls taken by theater owners proved Popeye more popular than Mickey, and Popeye upheld his position for the rest of the decade.

Fleischer cartoons differed highly from their counterparts at Walt Disney Productions and Leon Schlesinger Productions. The Popeye series, like other cartoons produced by the Fleischers, had a more urban feel (the Fleischer's studio was in Midtown Manhattan), had plots that were variations on a single simple formula, and featured the characters' (often improvised) under-the-breath mutterings. The voices for Fleischer cartoons produced during the early and mid-1930s were recorded after the animation was completed. The actors, Mercer in particular, would therefore improvise lines that were not on the storyboards or prepared for the lip-sync (generally word-play and clever puns). Popeye lives in a dilapidated apartment building in A Dream Walking (1934), reflecting the urban feel and Depression-era hardships.

The Fleischers moved their studio to Miami, Florida, in September 1938 in order to weaken union control and take advantage of tax breaks. The Popeye series continued production, although a marked change was seen in the Florida-produced shorts: they were brighter and less detailed in their artwork. Also, the Fleischer's began pre-recording dialog for lip-sync shortly after moving to Miami, so Mercer and the other voice actors would record ad-libbed lines while watching a finished copy of the cartoon to add the improvisational touch in the prior cartoons. Mae Questel, who started a family, refused to move to Florida, and Margie Hines, the wife of Jack Mercer, voiced Olive Oyl through the end of 1943. Several voice actors, among them Pinto Colvig (better known as the voice of Disney's Goofy), succeeded Gus Wickie as the voice of Bluto between 1938 and 1940.

Fleischer Studios produced 108 Popeye cartoons, 105 of them in black-and-white. The remaining three were two-reel (double-length) Technicolor adaptations of stories from the Arabian Nights billed as "Popeye Color Features": Popeye the Sailor Meets Sindbad the Sailor (1936), Popeye the Sailor Meets Ali Baba's Forty Thieves (1937), and Aladdin and His Wonderful Lamp (1939).

== Famous Studios ==
By the end of 1939, Max and Dave Fleischer had stopped speaking to each other altogether, communicating solely by memo. In 1940, they found themselves at odds with Paramount over the control of their animation studio. The studio borrowed heavily from Paramount in order to move to Florida and expand into features, and while their first feature, Gulliver's Travels (1939), was fairly successful, their second, Mr. Bug Goes to Town (1941) was not, and left the Fleischers in signing at debt to Paramount. In May 1941, Paramount assumed ownership of Fleischer Studios. The Fleischer's left by the turn of the year, and Paramount began reorganizing the studio, which they renamed Famous Studios. With Famous Studios headed by Sam Buchwald, Seymour Kneitel, I. Sparber and Dan Gordon, production continued on the Popeye shorts.

With World War II becoming a greater concern in the United States, Popeye enlisted into the U.S. Navy, as depicted in the 1941 short The Mighty Navy. His regular outfit was changed from the dark blue shirt with red-trimmed sailor collar and light blue bell-bottomed dungarees he wore in the original comics to an official US Navy sailor's white uniform, which he retained until the 1970s. Popeye becomes an ordinary, downtrodden, naval seaman in the wartime entries, usually getting the blame for mishaps. Film historian Leonard Maltin notes that the studio did not intend to make light of the war, but instead make Popeye more relevant with the times and show him in action. The early Famous-era shorts were often World War II-themed, featuring Popeye fighting Nazis and Japanese soldiers, most notably the 1942 short You're a Sap, Mr. Jap. As Popeye was popular in South America, Famous Studios set the 1944 cartoon W'ere on our Way to Rio in Brazil, as part of a "good neighbor" policy between the U.S. government and the rest of the hemisphere during the war.

In late 1943, the Popeye series was moved to Technicolor production, beginning with Her Honor the Mare. Though these cartoons were produced in full color, some films in the late 1940s period were released in less-expensive processes like Cinecolor and Polacolor. In January, 1944, Paramount had begun to move the studio back to New York, with Mae Questel resuming voice duties for Olive Oyl. Jack Mercer had been drafted into the Navy during World War II, and scripts were stockpiled for him to record while on leave. When Mercer was unavailable, Floyd Buckley and Harry Welch stood in as the voice of Popeye (Shape Ahoy had Mae Questel voicing Popeye, as well as Olive Oyl). New voice cast member Jackson Beck began voicing Bluto within a few years; he, Mercer, and Questel would continue to voice their respective characters into the 1960s. Over time, the Technicolor Famous shorts began to adhere even closer to the standard Popeye formula, and softened, rounder character designs - including an updated Olive Oyl which gave the character a current hairstyle and high heels - were evident by 1946.

Many established Fleischer animators stayed with Famous Studios and produced these new Popeye cartoons, but the loss of the founders was evident. Throughout the 1940s, the production values on Popeye remained relatively high. Animation historian Jerry Beck notes that the "gag sense and story sense fell into a bit of a rut." Most of the cartoons made during the Famous era were either stories revolving around a love triangle story between Popeye, Bluto and Olive, Popeye and Olive meeting a Bluto-like antagonist similar to the Fleischer's two-reel color cartoons, or remakes of older Popeye cartoons made during the Fleischer-era. Other recurring characters such as Popeye's nephews, Wimpy, and Poopdeck Pappy were scarcely used. Eugene the Jeep, who was used in three Fleischer cartoons, would not reappear in this era at all. By the mid 1950s, the budget at the studio became tight and the staff downsized, while still producing the same number of cartoons per year; this was typical of most animation studios at that time, due to the increasing competition from television. Many studios considered shutting their doors entirely. Paramount renamed the studio Paramount Cartoon Studios in 1956 and continued the Popeye series for one more year, with Spooky Swabs, released in August 1957, being the last of the 125 Famous shorts in the series.

== Music and theme song ==
Popeye's signature theme song was composed by Sammy Lerner and premiered in the first Popeye cartoon in 1933, sung by Popeye himself. For the first few cartoons, the opening credits music consists of a short instrumental excerpt of "The Sailor's Hornpipe", a traditional sea shanty dating to no later than the 1700s, playing over the Paramount logo, followed by a vocal variation on Andrew B. Sterling and Charles B. Ward's "Strike Up the Band (Here Comes a Sailor)", substituting the words "for Popeye the Sailor" in the latter phrase. An instrumental of Popeye's theme replaced the latter beginning with the third short, "Blow Me Down!".

Cartoon music historian Daniel Goldmark writes that Popeye is one of few cartoon characters of the time to have a theme; Disney/Warner Bros. composer Carl Stalling and MGM's Scott Bradley disliked using themes on a frequent basis and phased them out quickly, relegating their use almost always to title music.

Sammy Timberg and Winston Sharples composed most of the music for the Popeye shorts. Timberg also composed the themes to the Fleischers' Betty Boop and Superman cartoons, but asked Lerner to write Popeye's theme song because he had a date that night. While Timberg often incorporate original music and creative orchestrations, Sharples' music focused more on repetitious melodies, often repeating a song associated to a specific character. For the Popeye shorts, Popeye's theme would often be repeated numerous times throughout the cartoon.

The music of Popeye is described as a mix of "sunny show tunes and music from the street." Being located on Broadway, the Fleischers were well placed for popular music developments in the 1930s. Director Eric Goldberg notes a very urban feel to the music of Popeye, reflecting "the type of cartoons they were making." The Fleischers were big fans of jazz and would approach local jazz musicians to work on the cartoons, most of whom were more than happy to oblige. The use of jazz and very contemporary popular music highlighted how audiences were fascinated by new music. Tight on a budget, the producers took advantage of their free access to the Paramount music library, including hit songs that would be introduced in feature films. Many cartoons, such as It's the Natural Thing to Do (1939), take their titles from popular songs of the time. Staff songwriters would also write original songs for the shorts, such as in 1936's Brotherly Love and I Wanna Be a Lifeguard; the studio would hire outside songwriters to compose originals in addition. With the onset of World War II, the music in Popeye became more lush, fully orchestrated and patriotic.

The iconic Popeye theme song became a recognizable musical bookmark, further propelling the character's popularity.

== Theatrical Popeye cartoons on television ==
The original 1932 agreement between Fleischer/Paramount and King Features called for any films made within 10 years and any elements of them to be destroyed in 1942. This would have resulted in the destruction of all of the Fleischer Popeye shorts.

In 1955, Paramount sold the majority of their pre-October 1950 cartoon library to U.M. & M. TV Corporation. The Popeye shorts were sold separately, at a higher price. In June 1956, Paramount sold the Popeye cartoons to television syndicator Associated Artists Productions (AAP), one of the biggest television distributors at the time, for release to TV stations. Unlike the AAP distributed pre-August 1948 Warner Bros. cartoons, AAP was ordered to remove the Paramount logos and "Paramount presents" title cards from the Popeye cartoons. Like the WB cartoons, the Popeye shorts were given an AAP opening title card, using a version of the Popeye theme music introduced sometime in 1943; the cartoons closed with music first used in Olive Oyl for President in 1948. Yet, the AAP prints still referenced Fleischer and Famous Studios and left the Paramount credits and copyright tags intact. These Popeye cartoons became enormously popular on TV. Jerry Beck likens Popeye's television success to a "new lease on life," noting that the character had not been as popular since the 1930s.

King Features realized the potential for success and began distributing Popeye-based merchandise, which in turn led to a new series of Popeye shorts made for TV beginning in 1960. These shorts were farmed out to numerous studios and are of generally lower quality, employing limited animation, and many artists were unhappy with the quality of such cartoons.

By the 1970s, the original Fleischer and Famous Popeye cartoons were syndicated to various TV stations and channels across the globe. In the intervening years the theatrical Popeye cartoons slowly disappeared from TV, in favor of the newer made-for-television shorts. In 1958, AAP was sold to United Artists, which was purchased by Metro-Goldwyn-Mayer in 1981. Ted Turner purchased MGM/UA in 1986, gaining control of all of the theatrical Popeye shorts. Although Turner sold MGM back to Kirk Kerkorian some months later, Turner Entertainment Co. retained the pre-May 1986 MGM/UA film catalog.

After Turner's acquisition, the black-and-white Popeye shorts were shipped to South Korea, where artists retraced them into color. The process was intended to make the shorts more marketable in the modern television era, but prevented the viewers from seeing the original Fleischer pen-and-ink work, as well as the three-dimensional backgrounds created by Fleischer's "Stereoptical" process. Every other frame was traced, changing the animation from being "on ones" (24 frame/s) to being "on twos" (12 frame/s), and softening the pace of the films. These colorized shorts began airing on Superstation WTBS in 1986 during their Tom & Jerry and Friends 90-minute weekday morning and hour-long weekday afternoon shows. The retraced shorts were syndicated in 1987 on a barter basis, and remained available until the early 1990s. When Cartoon Network began in 1992, they mostly ran cartoons from the pre-May 1986 MGM library, which included the Popeye cartoons.

For many decades, viewers could only see a majority of the classic Popeye cartoons with the AAP-altered opening and closing credits. In 2001, Cartoon Network, under the supervision of animation historian Jerry Beck, launched The Popeye Show. The show aired the Fleischer and Famous Studios Popeye shorts in their complete, uncut original theatrical versions direct from prints that contained the original front-and-end Paramount credits, or, where those were unavailable, in versions approximating their original theatrical releases by replacing the AAP opening and closing credits with ones that recreated the originals using various sources. The series, which aired 135 Popeye shorts over 45 episodes, also featured segments offering trivia about the characters, voice actors, and animators. The program aired on Cartoon Network until March 2004. Cartoon Network's spin-off network Boomerang aired reruns of it after that, along with half-hour afternoon airings of Popeye cartoons that sometimes included the color-traced versions from the 1980s.

In 2012, Popeye reruns ceased until 2018, when Popeye cartoons returned to TV on Turner Classic Movies as single 7-minute shorts in March 2018, usually shown on Saturday mornings. It is also periodically pre-empted by special month-long or seasonal scheduling themes, such as February's "31 Days of Oscar" film series and the month-long "Summer Under the Stars". In November 2020, Boomerang aired Popeye again as part of the Boomerang Thanksgiving Feast. MeTV announced that they would air a Saturday morning cartoon block which includes the Fleischer/Famous Popeye cartoons beginning in January 2021. In February 2023, Boomerang started to air Popeye again.

In the UK, Popeye Cartoons aired on Cartoon Network from 1993 to 2001 and on Boomerang from 2000 to 2005. Since February 2021, Talking Pictures TV has aired the cartoons during their Saturday morning pictures block.

== Home media ==
There were legal problems between King Features Syndicate and United Artists in the early 1980s regarding the availability of Popeye cartoons on home video. United Artists had television rights, but King Features disputed whether that included home video distribution. In 1983, MGM/UA Home Video attempted to release a collection of Popeye cartoons on Betamax and VHS tapes titled The Best of Popeye, Vol. 1, but the release was canceled after MGM/UA received a cease and desist letter from King Features Syndicate, which claimed that they only had the legal rights to release the collection on video. While King Features owned the rights, material, comics, and merchandizing to Popeye's character, it did not have ownership to the cartoons themselves.

Throughout the years, there have been many VHS cassettes and DVDs featuring public domain Popeye cartoons, where the copyright had lapsed. While most of the Popeye cartoons remained unavailable on VHS tape, a handful of shorts fell into the public domain and were found on numerous low-budget VHS tapes and DVDs. Most used AAP prints from the 1950s, which were in very poor shape, thus resulting in very poor image quality. These cartoons were seven black-and-white 1930s and 1940s cartoons, 24 Famous Studios cartoons from the 1950s (many of which fell to the public domain after the MGM/UA merger), and all three Popeye color specials (although some copyrighted Popeye cartoons turned up on public domain VHS tapes and DVDs).

In 1997 (by which time the Popeye cartoons had come under ownership of Turner Entertainment Co.), home video rights to the pre-May 1986 MGM film library were reassigned from MGM/UA Home Video to Warner Home Video. It was reported in 2002 that Warner Bros. and King Features parent Hearst Corporation were working on a deal to release the Popeye cartoons on home video. Over 1,000 people signed an online petition asking WB and King Features to release the theatrical Popeye cartoons on DVDs.

Popeye cartoons were never officially released in any form until the late 2000s. In 2006, Warner Home Video, King Features Syndicate, and Hearst Corporation finally reached an agreement allowing for the release of the Popeye cartoons on home video. Paramount Pictures allowed Warner Bros. to restore the original Paramount logos on the cartoons as part of a cross-licensing deal between the two companies (which also permitted the use of the "Warner Bros. Shield" logo on certain films produced by John Wayne's Batjac Productions that were originally released by Warner Bros. but are now distributed by Paramount) thus preserving the artistic integrity of the original theatrical releases. Three volumes were produced between 2007 and 2008, released in the order the cartoons were released to theaters.

The first of Warner Bros.'s Popeye DVD sets, covering the cartoons released from 1933 until early 1938, was released on July 31, 2007. Popeye the Sailor: 1933–1938, Volume 1, a four-disc collector's edition DVD, contains the first 60 Fleischer Popeye cartoons, including the color specials Popeye the Sailor Meets Sindbad the Sailor and Popeye the Sailor Meets Ali Baba's Forty Thieves. Volumes 1 and 3 have the "Intended For Adult Collector And May Not Be Suitable For Children" advisory warning on the back of the box- with a text disclaimer at the beginning of each disc warning that certain shorts "...may reflect certain racist, sexist and ethnic prejudices that were commonplace in American society at the time" – similar to that seen on the Looney Tunes Golden Collection DVDs. The shorts were digitally restored and featured numerous bonus features; including audio commentary tracks and documentary featurettes. Historians supervised the release as consultants, assuring no colorized versions of unrestored prints were used. The first volume was included, either erroneously or through somewhat fraudulent means, in a batch of boxed sets sold in discount outlets for $3 or less in the summer of 2009.

Initially, there were four volumes of four-disc Popeye collections planned: the second volume would feature the remaining black-and-white Popeye cartoons from 1938 to 1943, with Volumes 3 and 4 covering the color Famous Studios cartoons released between 1943 and 1957. Due to the 2008 financial crisis, Warner Home Video was forced to re-work Volume 2 into a series of two-disc sets. Popeye the Sailor: 1938–1940, Volume 2 was released on June 17, 2008, and includes the final color Popeye special Aladdin and His Wonderful Lamp. Popeye the Sailor: 1941–1943, Volume 3 was released on November 4, 2008, and includes Popeye's three seldom shown wartime cartoons: You're a Sap, Mr. Jap (1942), Scrap the Japs (1942), and Seein' Red, White 'N' Blue (1943). Like Volume 1 these sets contained a plethora of bonus material.

The remaining volumes featuring the color Famous Studios cartoons were abandoned due to the higher costs of restoring color cartoons and the low sales of the previous volumes due to the recession in the late 2000s. In 2018, Warner Archive Collection announced they were releasing a series of single-disc Blu-ray sets entitled Popeye the Sailor: The 1940s which continued where the previous DVD sets left off almost a decade earlier. Unlike the previous DVD sets the Blu-rays did not feature any bonus material, but the shorts were digitally restored and uncut. Popeye the Sailor: The 1940s, Volume 1 was released on December 11, 2018, and contained 14 color Popeye shorts released from 1943 to 1945. Popeye the Sailor: The 1940s, Volume 2 was released in June 2019 featuring the next 15 Popeye cartoons from 1946 to 1947. Popeye the Sailor: The 1940s, Volume 3 was released in September 2019 and featured the remaining 17 Popeye cartoons of the decade released from 1948 to the end of 1949.

In January 2020, Warner Archive announced they were "taking a break" from producing Popeye sets to focus on other classic animated titles, such as Tex Avery Screwball Classics. As of 2026, the remaining 62 Popeye cartoons released between 1950 and 1957 have yet to be released.

=== DVD collections ===
- Popeye the Sailor: 1933–1938, Volume 1 (released July 31, 2007) features cartoons released from 1933 to early 1938 and contains the color Popeye specials Popeye the Sailor Meets Sindbad the Sailor and Popeye the Sailor Meets Ali Baba's Forty Thieves.
- Popeye the Sailor: 1938–1940, Volume 2 (released June 17, 2008) features cartoons released from late 1938 to 1940 and includes the last color Popeye special Aladdin and His Wonderful Lamp.
- Popeye the Sailor: 1941–1943, Volume 3 (released November 4, 2008) features the remaining black-and-white Popeye cartoons released from 1941 to 1943 and covers the transition from Fleischer Studios to Famous Studios producing the cartoons.
- Popeye the Sailor: The 1940s, Volume 1 (released December 11, 2018) features the first 14 color Popeye shorts produced by Famous Studios from 1943 to 1945. The set was made available on Blu-ray and DVD.
- Popeye the Sailor: The 1940s, Volume 2 (released June 18, 2019) features the next 15 color Popeye shorts produced by Famous Studios from 1946 to 1947. The set was made available on Blu-ray and DVD.
- Popeye the Sailor: The 1940s, Volume 3 (released September 17, 2019) features the next 17 color Popeye shorts produced by Famous Studios from 1948 to 1949. The set was made available on Blu-ray and DVD.

== Filmography ==
- Popeye the Sailor filmography (Fleischer Studios) (1933-1942)
- Popeye the Sailor filmography (Famous Studios) (1942-1957)
- Popeye (film) (1980)
