= Spinach Fer Britain =

- Directed by: I. Sparber; Animation Director: Jim Tyer (uncredited)
- Story by: Carl Meyer
- Produced by: Seymour Kneitel; I. Sparber; Dan Gordon; Executive Producer: Sam Buchward (all uncredited)
- Starring: Jack Mercer (uncredited)
- Music by: Winston Sharples (uncredited)
- Animation by: Jim Tyer; Abner Kneitel; Uncredited Animation: George Germanetti; Ben Solomon; Tom Baron
- Color process: Black and white
- Production company: Famous Studios
- Distributed by: Paramount Pictures
- Release date: January 22, 1943
- Running time: 6:26
- Language: English

Spinach Fer Britain is a 1943 anti-Nazi propaganda cartoon, produced by Famous Studios and distributed by Paramount Pictures. The film centers around Popeye the Sailor trying to deliver a shipment of spinach to 10 Downing Street in London, while fighting off Nazi Kriegsmarine soldiers pursuing him in a U-boat. The short was released on January 22, 1943.

Like its predecessor, You're a Sap, Mr. Jap, Spinach Fer Britain was kept out of distribution for several decades, due to its propagandistic nature and frequent display of Nazism, until it received an official release in November 2008 in a DVD collection of Popeye cartoons produced between 1941–1943. It also had limited airings on Cartoon Network as part of The Popeye Show.

== Plot ==
The short opens with five Nazi German soldiers patrolling the coast of Europe in a U-boat, destroying everything they encounter (even a fellow U-boat). Each time they defeat an enemy, one of them jumps onto the bow of the U-boat and the Nazi captain emerges as they shout "Heil Hitler!" while exchanging salutes before the crewman jumps on the captain and stuffs him back into the sub before they dive to resume their patrol.

Meanwhile, Popeye the Sailor is heading for Britain with a shipment of spinach to donate as a war ration; as he approaches the White Cliffs of Dover, his ship is attacked and sunk by the Nazi patrol before he can reach Britain. Popeye manages to escape with his spinach in a rowboat but is pursued by the Nazis. Popeye flips the U-boat upside-down and quickly withdraws.

But Popeye rows into a minefield and his boat is destroyed before he can escape. Popeye quickly collects all his spinach before the U-boat catches up with him. The Nazis ready their U-boat's turret but smoke from Popeye's tobacco pipe causes it to sneeze and fire uncontrollably, knocking Popeye out cold and sending his spinach flying into the air. The Nazis, believing Popeye to be dead, emerge from their U-boat and salute; all of Popeye's spinach falls through the U-boat's bulkhead door. Popeye, dazed and unconscious, topples down to the ocean floor, with the U-boat's propeller atop his head like a beanie. Popeye quickly regains consciousness and takes out a can of spinach, using the spinning propeller as a can opener. Swallowing its contents causes Popeye's arm to grow a depth charge. Using the propeller for transportation, he blows a hole in the Nazis U-boat. One-by-one, four Nazi soldiers emerge from the ruined sub as Popeye delivers them each a single uppercut, causing them to fly up, still saluting, into the minefield to their deaths.

Popeye rows the half-destroyed U-boat toward Britain. He enters a heavy fog and the U-boat ends up crashing into traffic right outside 10 Downing Street in London, where all the cans of spinach spill out of the sub to the cheers of the Londoners. Popeye exits the sub along with the battered Nazi captain, who salutes and says "Heil Hitler!" Popeye stuffs him back into the U-boat before popping back out and puffing his tobacco pipe to "V for Victory.”

== Availability ==
Due to the short's World War II ethnic stereotyping of Nazi stereotypes, the short was banned from TV, but was presented on Cartoon Network and [adult swim] as part of its anthology series The Popeye Show.

Spinach Fer Britain is available on Popeye the Sailor: 1941–1943, Volume 3 DVD collection.
