= Popeye the Sailor Meets Sindbad the Sailor =

1936 animated short film directed by Dave Fleischer

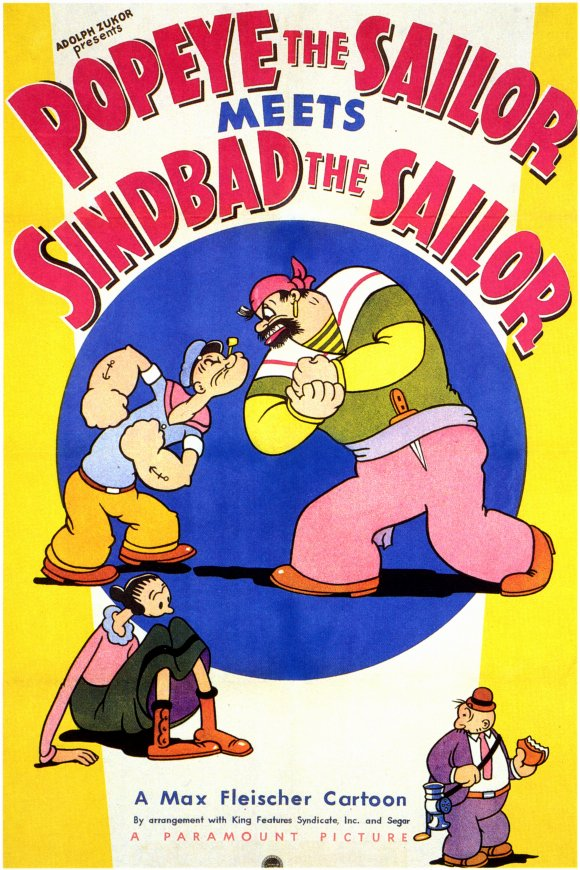
- Theatrical poster
- Directed by: Dave Fleischer
- Story by: Joe Stultz (uncredited); Bill Turner (uncredited); Jack Ward (uncredited); Izzy Sparber (uncredited)
- Based on: Sinbad the Sailor
- Produced by: Max Fleischer; Adolph Zukor
- Starring: Jack Mercer; Mae Questel; Gus Wickie; Lou Fleischer; Bradley Barker
- Music by: Sammy Timberg; Bob Rothberg; Sammy Lerner
- Animation by: Willard Bowsky; Lillian Friedman; George Germanetti; Edward Nolan; Orestes Calpini
- Color process: Technicolor
- Production company: Fleischer Studios
- Distributed by: Paramount Pictures
- Release date: November 27, 1936
- Running time: 16:33 (two reels)
- Country: United States
- Language: English

Popeye the Sailor Meets Sindbad the Sailor is a 1936 two-reel animated cartoon short subject in the Popeye Color Specials series, produced in Technicolor and released to theatres on November 27, 1936, by Paramount Pictures. It was produced by Max Fleischer for Fleischer Studios and directed by Dave Fleischer, with the title song's music composed by Sammy Timberg and lyrics written by Bob Rothberg. The voice cast includes Jack Mercer as Popeye, Gus Wickie as Sindbad the Sailor, Mae Questel as Olive Oyl and Lou Fleischer as J. Wellington Wimpy.

In 2004, the film was selected for preservation in the United States National Film Registry by the Library of Congress as being "culturally, historically, or aesthetically significant".

== Plot ==
Popeye the Sailor Meets Sindbad the Sailor (full film)

Sindbad the Sailor (intended to be an alternate version of Popeye's old nemesis Bluto) lives on an island where he keeps loads of creatures that he had captured during his adventures, where he proclaims himself, in song, to be the greatest sailor, adventurer, and lover in the world and "the most remarkable, extraordinary fellow," a claim that is inadvertently challenged by Popeye as he innocently sings his usual song while sailing by within earshot of Sindbad's island with his girlfriend Olive Oyl and friend J. Wellington Wimpy on board.

Sindbad orders his huge roc to kidnap Olive Oyl, and wreck Popeye's ship, forcing him and Wimpy to swim to shore. Sindbad relishes making Olive his trophy wife, which is interrupted by Popeye's arrival. Sindbad then challenges the one-eyed sailor to a series of obstacles to prove his greatness, including fighting the roc, a two-headed giant named Boola (an apparent parody reference to the Three Stooges), and Sindbad himself. Popeye makes short work of the bird and the giant, but Sindbad almost gets the best of him until Popeye produces his can of spinach, which gives him the power to soundly defeat Sindbad and proclaim himself "the most remarkable, extraordinary fella."

A subtly dark running gag features the hamburger-loving Wimpy chasing after a duck on the island with a meat grinder, with the intention of grinding it up so that he can fry it into his favorite dish, but the duck not only escapes, but also snatches away Wimpy's last burger in retaliation when he gives up.

== Voice Cast ==
- Jack Mercer as Popeye the Sailor
- Mae Questel as Olive Oyl
- Gus Wickie as Bluto (aka Sinbad the Sailor)
- Lou Fleischer as J. Wellington Wimpy (unconfirmed)
- Bradley Barker as Roc

== Production ==
This is the first of three Popeye Color Specials, the others being including Popeye the Sailor Meets Ali Baba's Forty Thieves, and Aladdin and His Wonderful Lamp (all adapted from One Thousand and One Nights). Many of the scenes in this short feature make use of the Fleischer's multiplane camera "Stereoptical Process", or "Setback Tabletop" process, which used modeled sets to create 3D backgrounds for the cartoon.

== Release and reception ==
This short was the first of the three Popeye Color Specials, which, at over sixteen minutes each, were billed as "A Popeye Feature." It was also the first Popeye color cartoon in general. Popeye the Sailor Meets Sindbad the Sailor was nominated for the 1936 Academy Award for Best Short Subject: Cartoons, but lost to Walt Disney's Silly Symphony short The Country Cousin. Footage from this short was later used in the 1952 Famous Studios Popeye cartoon Big Bad Sindbad, in which Popeye relates the story of his encounter with Sindbad to his 3 nephews.

The Popeye Color Specials are in the public domain and are widely available on home video and DVD, often transferred from prints of poorer quality. A fully restored version with the original opening and closing titles is available on the Popeye the Sailor: 1933–1938, Volume 1 DVD set from Warner Bros.

Producer and special effects artist Ray Harryhausen stated in his Fantasy Film Scrapbook that Popeye the Sailor Meets Sindbad the Sailor was a major influence on his production of The 7th Voyage of Sinbad.

In 1994, the film was voted #17 of The 50 Greatest Cartoons of all time by members in the animation field, and is the highest ranked Fleischer cartoon in the book. In 2004, Popeye the Sailor Meets Sindbad the Sailor was deemed "culturally significant" by the United States Library of Congress and selected for preservation in the National Film Registry.
