= You're a Sap, Mr. Jap =

1942 film by Dan Gordon

- Directed by: Dan Gordon; Animation Director: Jim Tyer (uncredited)
- Story by: Jim Tyer; Carl Meyer
- Produced by: Seymour Kneitel; I. Sparber; Dan Gordon; Executive producer Sam Buchwald (all uncredited)
- Starring: Jack Mercer (all voices - uncredited)
- Music by: Sammy Timberg (uncredited)
- Animation by: Jim Tyer; George Germanetti; Uncredited Animation: Tom Johnson; Ben Solomon; Frank Endres
- Color process: Black-and-white
- Production company: Famous Studios
- Distributed by: Paramount Pictures
- Release date: August 7, 1942
- Running time: 7:13
- Language: English

You're a Sap, Mr. Jap is a 1942 one-reel anti-Japanese Popeye the Sailor animated cartoon short subject released by Paramount Pictures on August 7, 1942. It was the first cartoon short to be produced by Famous Studios. It is one of the best-known World War II propaganda cartoons.

== Plot ==
The short opens with the song "You're a Sap, Mr. Jap", a Tin Pan Alley wartime song that was released three days after the Attack on Pearl Harbor. Popeye is riding in his boat and looking around through his binoculars. Popeye spots a small Japanese boat, so he throws his anchor at the Japanese boat. A Japanese man is fishing on the boat, and another Japanese man comes out from inside the boat. They present Popeye with a peace treaty.

As Popeye signs the treaty, the Japanese hit Popeye with a giant mallet. Popeye turns around and continues signing the treaty, and one of the Japanese men sticks a firecracker in a hole at the bottom of Popeye's shoe and blows on it, causing it to explode. He then jumps on Popeye's foot, and kicks it. The Japanese give Popeye a bouquet with a lobster hiding inside of it, which punches Popeye and breaks his pipe. Popeye then walks up to one of the Japanese and corners him while holding the bouquet close to his head. The lobster pops out and punches the Japanese man, then cuts off his hair. The Japanese man then slips through his kimono (it is revealed that he is wearing a military outfit underneath) and runs into the hull, alerting his crewmates to emerge the rest of the boat out of the water.

The Japanese boat is now shown to be much larger than it initially appeared. The Japanese ship blasts a cannon at Popeye's boat. While Popeye hangs to his boat's mast, two other Japanese sailors saw the mast which causes Popeye to drown. Typical among Popeye cartoons, Popeye is seemingly about to lose but eats his trademark spinach. He blows through a tube on his boat which causes it to rise back to the surface. He attacks the same two Japanese sailors who cut his boat's mast, which causes them to fall into the water. Popeye then swims to the Japanese boat and gets the anchor, then bends it to use to pull out the cannons.

Popeye then runs to the other side of the ship and finds a group of Japanese sailors hiding inside the remains of a cannon, so he kicks them into the water. The Japanese boat then begins to fall apart. From inside of the boat's hull, a Japanese Naval Officer talks to himself and contemplates committing suicide because he is losing against Popeye. He drinks gasoline and eats firecrackers, and the explosions from inside his body cause him to jump out of the boat. Popeye looks in his mouth and notices that he has gas in his stomach, which means that he could explode. Popeye then throws him back under the boat before jumping back to his boat and sailing as far away as he can. Popeye looks through his binoculars and watches the Japanese ship explode and sink into the water. As the boat sinks, the sound of a flushing toilet is heard.

== Production notes ==
You're a Sap, Mr. Jap is one of the few Popeye the Sailor cartoons not to feature Bluto, Olive Oyl, or Wimpy. A version of this cartoon was presented by Associated Artists Productions, Inc. in the 1950s. The film title gets its name from a novelty song written by James Cavanaugh, John Redmond and Nat Simon.

Although You're a Sap, Mr. Jap was released after Famous Studios was established on May 25, 1942, it was released before the final Fleischer Studios cartoon Terror on the Midway, featuring Superman, released on August 30.

The film was unavailable for commercial release for years due to its racially offensive caricaturing of the Japanese.

== See also ==
- Scrap the Japs
- Spinach Fer Britain
- Seein' Red, White 'N' Blue
- Der Fuehrer's Face
- List of World War II short films
