= Fright to the Finish =

- Directed by: Seymour Kneitel
- Story by: Jack Mercer
- Produced by: Seymour Kneitel; Izzy Sparber
- Starring: Jack Mercer; Mae Questel; Jackson Beck
- Music by: Winston Sharples
- Production company: Famous Studios
- Distributed by: Paramount Pictures
- Release date: August 27, 1954
- Running time: 6 minutes
- Country: U.S.
- Language: English

Fright to the Finish is a 1954 animated American short film directed by Seymour Kneitel and Al Eugster starring Jack Mercer as Popeye. The short was released by Paramount Pictures on August 27, 1954.

== Plot summary ==
It is Halloween night and Olive is reading ghost stories to Popeye and Bluto. Both of the men want to have alone time with Olive, with Popeye wondering if Bluto hasn't got a home to go to and Bluto wondering what to do to get rid of "that runt" Popeye. Bluto pretends to leave in order to stage various pranks (a headless man, an animated skeleton, and a sheet-over-balloon ghost) to scare Olive and Popeye. He pins the blame on Popeye, who is kicked out of the house by Olive, and Bluto goes to comfort her.

Popeye gets back at Bluto by going into Olive's bedroom through her window (which was still open) and uses a jar of vanishing cream to make himself invisible. He scares both Olive and Bluto (mainly Bluto), and Bluto eventually runs out of Olive's house. Popeye reveals himself and Olive kisses him for saving her, getting red lipstick all over Popeye's face. Popeye turns to the audience and says, "Loves them ghosts" then he laughs.

== Cast ==
The cast consists of:

- Jackson Beck as Bluto
- Jack Mercer as Popeye
- Mae Questel as Olive Oyl

== See also ==
- List of films set around Halloween
