= Aladdin and His Wonderful Lamp =

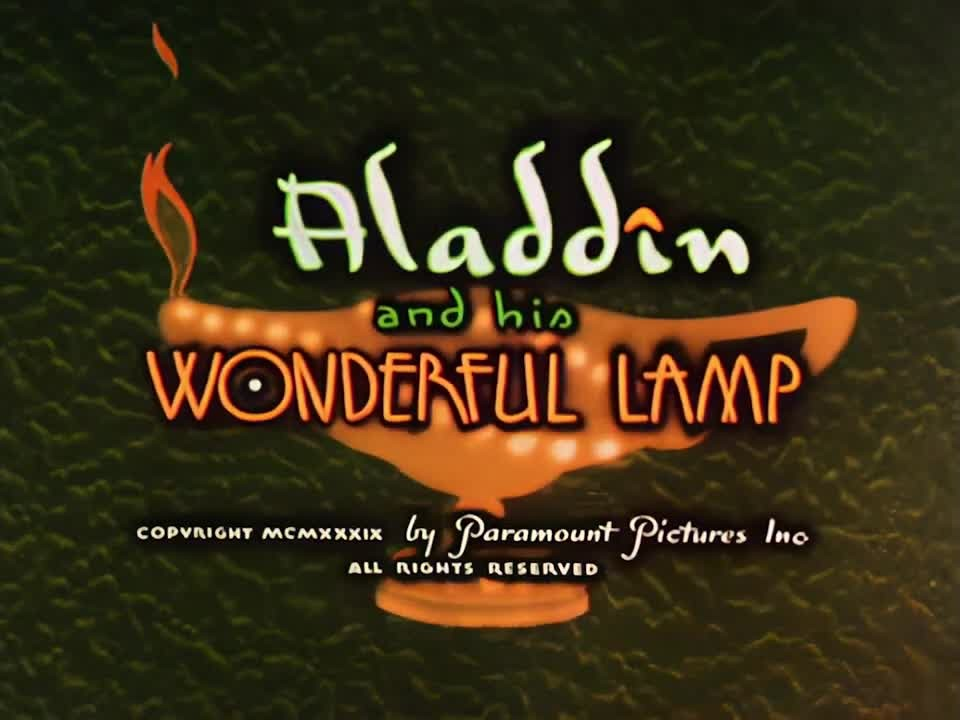
- Title screen
- Directed by: Dave Fleischer
- Story by: Bill Turner (uncredited); Jack Ward (uncredited); Cal Howard (uncredited); Izzy Sparber (uncredited)
- Produced by: Max Fleischer
- Starring: Margie Hines; Jack Mercer; Carl Meyer; Arthur Boran
- Music by: Sammy Timberg
- Animation by: David Tendlar; Nicholas Tafuri; William Sturm; Reuben Grossman
- Color process: Technicolor
- Production company: Fleischer Studios
- Distributed by: Paramount Pictures
- Release date: April 7, 1939
- Running time: 21 minutes (two reels)
- Country: United States
- Language: English

Aladdin and His Wonderful Lamp is a two-reel animated cartoon short subject in the Popeye Color Specials series, produced in Technicolor and released to theaters on April 7, 1939, by Paramount Pictures. It was produced by Max Fleischer, and directed by Dave Fleischer for Fleischer Studios, Inc., with David Tendlar serving as head animator, and music being supervised by Sammy Timberg. The voice of Popeye is performed by Jack Mercer, with additional voices by Margie Hines as Olive Oyl and Carl Meyer as the evil Wazzir.

== Plot ==
This short features Olive as a screenwriter for Surprise Pictures, working on a treatment of the story of Aladdin that will feature herself as the beautiful princess and Popeye as Aladdin, all the while speaking in rhyme. As she types, her adaptation of Aladdin comes to life on the screen, with Popeye having to use his wits against an evil vizier who seeks to control a magic lamp inhabited by a powerful genie. After completing the script, Olive gets a termination of employment notice from the front office, which reads "Your story of Aladdin is being thrown out... and so are you! [signed] Surprise".

== Release and reception ==
This short was the last of the three Popeye Color Specials, which were, at over sixteen minutes each, three times as long as a regular Popeye cartoon, and were often billed in theaters alongside or above the main feature. Unlike the first two films, Aladdin and His Wonderful Lamp is more Disney-esque in plot and pacing, and does not make use of the Fleischer Tabletop 3D background process. According to the film's press release, its making involved two hundred colors and twenty-eight thousand individual, full-color drawings; the press release also mentions 3D animation, but such footage was never used in the final version. However, a glimpse can be obtained in a Popular Science short, which documents the film's making, and reveals a sculpted model of the castle being photographed. Running at twenty-one minutes, Aladdin and His Wonderful Lamp is the longest entry in the "color feature" series, and the only one produced at the relocated Fleischer Studios facility in Miami, Florida. Footage from the short, with a new soundtrack and rerecorded dialogue, was reused in the 1949 cartoon "Popeye's Premiere," wherein it is presented as a motion picture that Popeye starred in.

Today, this short and the other two Popeye Color Specials, Popeye the Sailor Meets Sindbad the Sailor and Popeye the Sailor Meets Ali Baba's Forty Thieves (all adapted from One Thousand and One Nights), are in the public domain, and are widely available on various home video and DVD collections, usually transferred from poorer quality prints. Warner Bros. has fully restored this cartoon with the original Paramount mountain logo opening and closing titles and is included in Popeye the Sailor: 1938–1940, Volume 2, which was released on June 17, 2008. It also includes a documentary on the making of this cartoon as a bonus feature in this collection. This version also aired one time on Turner Classic Movies' celebration of Fleischer Studios during October 2021.
