= Ancient Fistory =

1953 American animated short film

- Directed by: Seymour Kneitel; Animation Director: Al Eugster (uncredited)
- Story by: Irving Spector
- Produced by: Seymour Kneitel; I. Sparber (both uncredited)
- Starring: Jack Mercer; Mae Questel; Jackson Beck (all uncredited)
- Music by: Winston Sharples
- Animation by: Al Eugster; Wm. B. Pattengill
- Backgrounds by: Robert Connavale (scenic artist)
- Production company: Famous Studios
- Distributed by: Paramount Pictures
- Release date: January 30, 1953
- Running time: 6 minutes 46 seconds
- Country: U.S.
- Language: English

Popeye The Sailor - Ancient Fistory

Ancient Fistory is a 1953 American animated short film directed by Seymour Kneitel and starring Jack Mercer in multiple roles (including Popeye). The film was released by Paramount Pictures on January 30, 1953. It was based on a gender-reversed parody of the fairy tale Cinderella and a possible inspiration for the 1960 film Cinderfella starring Jerry Lewis.

== Premise ==
It is the Middle Ages: a Grand Ball is being held in which Princess Olive will choose her husband. At Bluto's Beanery, the owner leaves to go to the ball leaving all duties to his overworked, raggedy employee, Popeye. The latter's lamentations are ended by the appearance of his Fairy Godfather, who asks for a spinach can which to turn into an anachronistic car for Popeye and then gives him princely robes. Popeye thanks him. But, his Fairy Godfather warns him to return home by midnight or he'll change back to rags again, right before he disappears and Popeye leaves.

Meanwhile, at the ball, Princess Olive trips while gracefully descending the stairs and is helped by Bluto - who also tries her crown on for size. Yet the princess is not attracted to him and seems much more interested in the newly arrived "Cinderfella". The two men begin to fight for the fair princess, but she breaks the quarrel and chooses archery as the contest for her hand. Bluto blatantly cheats by lifting the target to achieve bullseye, then sabotages Popeye's arrow to make it go out a castle window where it gives a bovine a black eye, thus also achieving "ye real bullseye".

The rivals then go on a duel with pistols, where not only does Bluto shoot early but does so with a cannon, firing his opponent all the way to his car chariot to be left unconscious. Olive is then harassed by the disgusting man that wants to forcibly kiss her, and chased all through the castle as she cries "Saveth me, help!!" Popeye is too late to return home, as midnight strikes and he loses his luxury vehicle and clothes. However, this allows him to eat the contents of his former ride and gain a knight's armor and a horse. He swings a mighty fist at the predator, whose own armor remains then trap him in a stove. The townsfolk celebrate as their princess announces her betrothed, Popeye. They ride together while kissing tenderly but, as the short reaches the end, his helm visor falls on her nose.

== Cast ==
The cast consists of:

- Jack Mercer as Popeye / Fairy Godfather / Guest Announcer / Bull
- Mae Questel as Olive Oyl
- Jackson Beck as Bluto
