= Spooky Swabs =

1957 short film

- Directed by: I. Sparber
- Story by: Larz Bourne
- Produced by: Seymour Kneitel; I. Sparber
- Music by: Winston Sharples
- Animation by: Thomas Johnson; Frank Endres
- Backgrounds by: John Zago (Scenics)
- Color process: Technicolor
- Production company: Paramount Cartoon Studios
- Distributed by: Paramount Pictures
- Release date: August 9, 1957
- Running time: 6 minutes
- Country: United States
- Language: English

Spooky Swabs is a Popeye theatrical cartoon short, starring Jack Mercer as Popeye, Mae Questel as Olive Oyl and Mercer, Jackson Beck, Sid Raymond and Gilbert Mack as the ghosts. Produced by Paramount Cartoon Studios (formerly Famous Studios) and directed by Isadore Sparber, it was released in 1957 and is the final cartoon in the Popeye series of theatrical cartoons released by Paramount Pictures.

== Plot ==
Full film

Popeye and Olive Oyl are out at sea on a life raft playing checkers. Popeye suddenly spies an old sailing ship on the horizon, which also thrills Olive who cannot wait to go home and watch television again. Popeye then twirls his pipe around and, using it like an outboard motor, propels the raft towards the ship. The raft hits the ship and breaks apart, catapulting Popeye and Olive aboard. The camera then pulls over to the ship's figurehead, which also reveals the ship is called "Sea Witch," which has been adrift at sea since 1678.

Unbeknownst to the couple, as they search the ship for the crew, the ship does have a crew, but of ghosts with English accents (voiced by Mercer, Jackson Beck, Sid Raymond and Gilbert Mack). Upon hearing voices outside their quarters, the ghosts wake up and spot the boarders. Despite concluding that the ship is deserted, Popeye determines that the ship is still seaworthy enough to return to land. Having heard this, the ghosts become alarmed, as they like the peace and quiet of being adrift at sea. The captain of the ghost crew agrees that they must get rid of the boarders in order to keep their peaceful life at sea intact.

Soon afterwards, as Popeye starts to sail the ship in the direction towards land, two ghosts appear behind Olive (resting in the anchor rope) and toss the anchor overboard (to stop the ship in place), which unravels the rope and sends Olive flying and spinning. Olive then flies towards Popeye and, with her spinning legs, knocks him through the ship's wheel, much to the amusement of the ghosts. Olive manages to pull the wheel off Popeye, but gets stuck in the wheel herself, generating more laughter from the ghosts.

Later, while Olive repairs the wheel, Popeye starts pulling up the anchor, which gets the ship moving again, but one ghost paints grease on the last few yards of the rope and another ghost tangles some of the anchor rope around Popeye's leg. As soon as the anchor is almost aboard, the greased part of the rope slips through Popeye's hands and the anchor stops the ship again and pulls Popeye overboard into the water. While Popeye struggles underwater trying to free himself from the rope, Olive tries to pull the anchor back up, but isn't strong enough. The ghosts (now invisible) blindfold Olive and force her to the plank. Back underwater, Popeye manages to grab a swordfish and use its snout to cut the rope, allowing him to swim back to the surface and back on to the ship, which has now started moving again.

At this point, the ghosts (still invisible and holding a sword) force Olive to walk the length of the plank while Olive cries out for Popeye. The sword disappears just as Popeye sees Olive almost about to walk off the edge of the plank. He picks it up and redirects it so that Olive ends up landing face first into a bucket of water. Olive cries out that she's drowning, but Popeye reassures her she's all right and goes to steer the ship. Just as soon as Olive spits out some water, she suddenly feels herself being carried along the deck. The moment Olive begins to state her suspicions about the ship, two ghosts (carrying her) appear, holding her by her arms.

Olive then freaks out and manages to escape the ghosts' grip, running past Popeye while screaming "Ghosts!," and immediately dives overboard, but Popeye catches her just in time and pulls her back aboard. Popeye tries to assure her that ghosts aren't real, but a ghost cuts loose a sail above them and the sail falls onto Popeye. Seeing Popeye covered by the sail, Olive shrieks (thinking Popeye is a ghost), grabs a quartermaster's baton, and starts clubbing Popeye with it, but Popeye's shouts make her realize her mistake.

Seeing that all their haunting isn't working, the ghosts run towards Popeye and Olive while wielding swords and shouting out what they intend to do with them. Olive flees to another part of the ship while Popeye runs into the ship's galley. While inside, he sees a jar of "ye king's spinach" and runs back out to face the attacking ghosts. Popeye immediately consumes the spinach and becomes invisible. Popeye then appears in ghost form and punches all the ghosts so hard that they become solid. The now solid ghosts then crash into a wall, which allows Olive to sew them together into a new sail.

With the ship now ghost free, Popeye and Olive sail off into the sunset back for civilization.

== Availability ==
Because the cartoon is in the public domain in the United States, it is available on various VHS and DVD compilations of theatrical Popeye cartoons as well as streaming video from various web sites.

== See also ==
- List of films in the public domain in the United States
