= Me Musical Nephews =

- Directed by: Seymour Kneitel; Animation Director: Tom Johnson (uncredited)
- Story by: Jack Mercer; Jack Ward
- Produced by: Seymour Kneitel; I. Sparber; Dan Gordon; Executive producer: Sam Buchwald (all uncredited)
- Starring: Jack Mercer (all voices - uncredited)
- Music by: Sammy Timberg (uncredited)
- Animation by: Tom Johnson; George Germanetti; Uncredited Animation: Frank Endres; John Walworth
- Color process: Black-and-white
- Production company: Famous Studios
- Distributed by: Paramount Pictures
- Release date: December 25, 1942
- Running time: 6:46
- Language: English

Me Musical Nephews is a 1942 one-reel animated cartoon directed by Seymour Kneitel and animated by Tom Johnson and George Germanetti. Jack Mercer and Jack Ward wrote the script. It is the 113th episode of the Popeye series, which was released on December 25, 1942.

== Plot ==
One night, the nephews are practicing playing their music while Popeye is continually falling asleep. He tells them to get ready for bed so he can tell them a story. The nephews are unhappy with the short story but are sent to bed anyway. The nephews are not so tired and eventually start playing music with various objects (such as mattress springs, suspenders, medicine bottles, etc.), and Popeye eventually hears the racket and destroys the radio trying to find what's causing the noise. He soon finds out it is coming from the nephews and tries to catch them in the act. The sailor fails however and tries to fall asleep anyway. The sailor goes crazy and jumps out of the movie theater screen, leaving the film to end with the music playing.

== Production notes ==
Me Musical Nephews was remade in color as Riot in Rhythm in 1950. There were a few differences made for these cartoons; for example, an uncredited Sammy Timberg composed the music for Me Musical Nephews, while the music for Riot in Rhythm was by Winston Sharples. There is also no mention of Swee'Pea.

Me Musical Nephews is in the public domain in the United States, as the copyright was not renewed.
