= Scrap the Japs =

- Directed by: Seymour Kneitel; Animation Director: Tom Johnson (uncredited)
- Story by: Carl Meyer
- Produced by: Dan Gordon; Seymour Kneitel; I. Sparber; Sam Buchwald (assistant, all uncredited)
- Starring: Jack Mercer (uncredited)
- Music by: Sammy Timberg; Winston Sharples (both uncredited)
- Animation by: Tom Johnson; Ben Solomon; Uncredited Animation: George Germanetti; Frank Endres
- Color process: Black and White
- Production company: Famous Studios
- Distributed by: Paramount Pictures
- Release date: November 20, 1942; (US)
- Running time: 6:10 minutes
- Country: United States
- Language: English

Scrap the Japs is a 1942 American anti-Japanese cartoon with the popular character Popeye as protagonist. It follows his adventures after being sent for punishment on a ship and running into Japanese sailors.

The film was produced by Famous Studios and released on November 20, 1942 by Paramount Pictures, and focuses on racist stereotypes of the Japanese during the war. These images were based on pre-existing images of the Japanese that the American people had in their minds from previous fears about immigration. Because of the racism, this cartoon, along with some other World War II cartoons is now banned from being broadcast in most countries.

== Plot ==
Popeye has jumped out of a plane without a parachute, and as punishment he has to do a variety of chores to keep the ship clean. He uses the planes on the ships to clean it (e.g. tying mops to the propellers) and also paints camouflage onto the ship showing that he is trying to help the war effort. However, before he can get his jobs done a ‘cloud’ appears that begins to drop bombs onto the ship. At first Popeye is confused but then it is revealed that the ‘cloud’ is actually attached to a Japanese plane with the lettering ‘Made in Japan’ written clearly on the back to make sure the audience knows who the enemy is. A Japanese soldier emerges depicted with thick glasses and big teeth to pander to contemporary racist stereotyping in America in an effort to demonize the enemy. Popeye uses terms like ‘Jap’ and ‘stormtrooper’ to describe the character and starts firing missiles at him from a plane while the stereotyped character frantically starts pedalling. Popeye manages to blow up the plane and the Japanese man is left holding a typical looking umbrella before falling onto a ‘Jap Scrap Repair Ship’. All of the Japanese sailors on the ship look the same, reinforcing the idea of a Japanese unified mass especially when they all make a drilling sound to fix the plane. After falling from his plane, Popeye also lands on the ‘Jap Scrap Repair Ship’ and it begins to tip. All of the Japanese sailors start beating him but after eating his spinach, he throws his empty spinach can in the water to distract them and they all jump into the water. Because of eating his spinach, Popeye turns into the Statue of Liberty which was a familiar symbol in anti-Nazi cartoons as it is also used in Disney’s Der Fuehrer’s Face (1943). As Popeye thinks he is safe, a big Japanese battleship sends bombs his way. But this time he is prepared and rides the repair ship into it. He is able to easily fight off the Japanese sailors and when he throws them into the body of the ship their imprints make a ‘V’ shape, perhaps showing Victory for the Allies. Popeye then uses a piece of railing from the ship to cut it up like a tin with a can opener before sitting back and eating an ice cream waiting for the ship to crumble. The cartoon ends with Popeye flying home with the Japanese sailors locked in a cage behind him, where they start complaining before they "turns" into rats and scurrying around.

== Symbolism/themes ==
There are many symbols and themes that can be seen in this cartoon that were hoped to be picked up by American audiences. For example when Popeye shouts ‘I have never seen a Jap that wasn’t yeller’ this was because the term yellow was rarely used to refer to the Japanese because this could also reflect badly on America’s Asian ally, China. Japan represented the ‘yellow peril’ and anti-Japanese prejudice was especially present on the West Coast of the United States. This culminated in severe restrictions on Asian immigration to America.

The term ‘Jap’ that Popeye used throughout the cartoon was also used to help create the idea that the West were fighting a different species, while Germans and Italians were treated as individuals, the Japanese as a race were seen to possess a herd instinct that led to extreme loyalty to their emperor. This can be seen on many occasions throughout the cartoon, for example when all of the sailors gathered round the plane to fix it they made a unified drilling sound. This was used by the American Government to help the American people to understand and be willing to fight the enemy as it is often easier when a group resembles an unidentified mass rather than individual civilians. Patriotism can be seen in the cartoon when Popeye briefly resembles the Statue of Liberty as this was often used as a symbol to represent American freedom and liberty.

Similarly, at the end of the cartoon when all of the Japanese were locked in the cage they resembled squealing mice which could represent their naturally higher pitched voices. The weakness of Japanese equipment and ships is also represented when Popeye is able to use part of the railing like a tin opener to destroy the battleship. The cloud that the Japanese sailor was hidden behind could also represent how good the Japanese were at camouflaging themselves especially when they were in jungle environments. Similarly, it could be a symbol for their cunning and cowardice, attacking from a cover. It could also reference the surprise attack on Pearl Harbor as it could be argued they used there cunning there as well. Other terms that were used such as ‘storm trooper’ also show the link between Germany and Japan. However, many anti-Nazi cartoons featuring Popeye didn’t really generate much suspense as everyone knew that the great Popeye would eventually triumph over the enemy. But it must be remembered that ‘this is a typical World War II propaganda cartoon with an ending that’s unpleasant and disturbing when viewed with today’s sensibilities.’

== Similar cartoons ==
There are many similar cartoons that feature anti-Japanese stereotypes. The most similar is You're a Sap, Mr. Jap (1942) in which Popeye spots a broken down fishing boat. When he goes on board, two foreign sailors hand him a false peace treaty which Popeye tries to sign (perhaps showing the willingness of the American people to stop war) before they hit him over the head with a mallet. They then try to give him a bouquet of flowers as an apology but it has an angry lobster inside. The broken down ship is eventually revealed to be disguising a huge destroyer and sinks Popeye’s ship. He eventually turns his bicep into a V for victory and destroys the ship. This again shows that Japanese ships were seen to be made very poorly.

Japanese stereotypes also appear in Spies (1943), part of the Private SNAFU cartoon series. The film is about how enemy spies could be anywhere and that you can’t trust anyone. The film starts with Private SNAFU walking down the street and he is adamant that he is going to keep a secret. As he walks through town, there are spies hiding in various places such as in a post box, a phone box and a pram but he is oblivious to them. The spies shown are racist depictions of the Japanese with big teeth and thick glasses. Eventually, little by little, Private SNAFU starts to reveal information to various characters he meets including a stereotypical looking German women at a bar. This may have been shown to American soldiers to show how easy it can be to let out secrets especially when under the influence of alcohol.

Commando Duck (1944) focuses on cementing anti-Japanese stereotypes while using the character of Donald Duck. The film begins with Donald parachuting into a remote jungle environment with the aim of destroying a Japanese airfield. After landing, he goes down a river on a small raft but is spotted by Japanese soldiers from the Imperial Japanese Army and they start firing at him. They are also shown firing the first shot at Donald’s back perhaps hinting at their cowardice. They are disguised as rocks and trees but still have racist Japanese features of big teeth and slanted eyes. However, Donald doesn’t realise that the soldiers are firing at him and he carries on down the river. After a while he gets stuck under a waterfall and his boat starts filling with water. Donald sees the Japanese airfield below when he is near the edge of the cliff and because it is so full of water it explodes sending all of the water onto the airfield.

== Anti-Japanese propaganda ==
The American Government carried out an intensive effort to mould the content of films made during the war. Officials of the Office of War Information (OWI), the propaganda agency, were constantly updating and releasing manuals telling all animation studios how they could help in the war effort and reviewed screenplays of every major studio. American propaganda portrayed the Japanese as the worst kind of enemies during the war. The temptation to use racial terms to describe the Japanese in these films was overwhelming as the US already had a history of anti-Japanese prejudice that was based on Japanese samurai traditions. This portrayed them as fanatic and ruthless with a desire for overseas conquest without seeing the consequences and this was reinforced when the Japanese attacked Pearl Harbor in 1941 and many studios’ first impulse was to capitalize on the theme of treachery and brutality. Propaganda was used with considerable effectiveness because the outcome of the attack was enormous and couldn’t be easily forgotten.

Cartoons with Japanese stereotypes made little effort to develop a Japanese character or explain what Japan hoped to accomplish from the war, they remained nameless. The Japanese enemies were freakish stereotypes but were more often showcased as idiots rather than actual threats, this may have been done to dehumanize them as this would make it easier for the American people to hate and kill them. When the Bureau of Motion Pictures heard of these portrayals of the Japanese they were not pleased and decided to get all studios to shift from the theme of racism to one of fascism. Of course, however, the US Government issued statements that the enemy was not the German, Italian or Japanese themselves but it was their leadership that America should despise. This went unnoticed as even Japanese Americans were being rounded up and put into internment camps in Washington, Oregon and California as it was thought they could join the enemy at any time, or commit acts of sabotage or espionage. An article in Time magazine even suggested how the American people could tell the difference between Asian people saying ‘the Japanese walk stiffly erect, hard heeled’ while the Chinese were more relaxed and had an ‘easy gait’. These factors reinforced the idea that the Japanese were a unified mass even if some of them lived in America. By 1944, a poll suggested that 13% of Americans wanted to kill all the Japanese population and by 1945, 22% were disappointed that more atomic bombs were not used on the Japanese after Hiroshima and Nagasaki. This shows that years of anti-Japanese propaganda and racial prejudices was starting to have an effect on the American population.

== See also ==
- American propaganda during World War II
- Asian immigration to the United States
