= Wickie =

Wickie may refer to:

- Gus Wickie (1885-1947), singer and voice-actor
- Vicky the Viking (Wickie und die starken Männer), 1974- and 2009-film
- Lighthouse keeper
