= Snow Place Like Home =

Snow Place Like Home may refer to:

- A 1948 Popeye cartoon
- Chapter IV of the episodically released King's Quest (2015)
