= Seein' Red, White 'N' Blue =

- Directed by: Dan Gordon; Animation Director: Jim Tyer (uncredited)
- Story by: Joe Stultz
- Produced by: Seymour Kneitel; I. Sparber; Dan Gordon; Executive Producer: Sam Buchwald (all uncredited)
- Starring: Jack Mercer; Dave Barry (both uncredited)
- Music by: Winston Sharples (uncredited)
- Animation by: Jim Tyer; Ben Solomon; Uncredited Animation: Tom Baron; Abner Kneitel; Al Eugster
- Color process: Black-and-white
- Production company: Famous Studios
- Distributed by: Paramount Pictures
- Release date: February 19, 1943
- Running time: 6:55
- Language: English

Seein' Red, White 'N' Blue is a 1943 American propaganda cartoon short featuring Popeye The Sailor, and was directed by Dan Gordon and Jim Tyer. The cartoon revolves around Bluto trying to escape the draft, but ends up fighting alongside Popeye against some Japanese spies, Hirohito and Adolf Hitler.

The cartoon is noticeable for its direction being more reminiscent of a Looney Tunes or Tex Avery cartoon, with wild, frenetic takes and fourth wall breaking gags geared at adults. This cartoon's score also features an excerpt of the tune of "I Don't Want To Walk Without You" which was first heard onscreen in Paramount's movie Sweater Girl. The song would be used again in a later Popeye short, Klondike Casanova, in 1946.

== Plot ==
While Bluto is busy at work as the towns blacksmith, he receives a letter calling him for his draft service in the Navy. Bluto is very reluctant to join in and pretends to be ill. Popeye, who works at the draft bureau, is suspicious and sends a female dummy in to create an enthusiastic reaction from him. Even though his trick works, Bluto still refuses to join the Navy. In a desperate effort to get an exemption, Bluto jumps out of the window, with Popeye running to the base floor to catch him. They both crash deep into the ground, in fact so deep that Satan himself asks them to leave Hell.

Bluto tries to flee, but is hit in a car accident. Even though he is knocked out, the ambulance is only interested in the tires of the vehicle and carries them away on a stretcher instead of Bluto (a likely reference to the high demand for rubber during the war). Bluto then decides to get crushed by a falling safe while ignoring Popeye's frantic gestures. Both end up getting crushed but remained unharmed. Bluto then locks Popeye in the safe before throwing it off screen. It crashes inside an orphanage, where several Imperial Japanese spies are undercover, dressed as babies. With their cover blown, they proceed to beat up Popeye. Bluto then drops by to inform him that his arms are bandaged and that he finally will be able to escape the draft. But Bluto sees that Popeye is in trouble, he tries to help, but he too is knocked out by the spies.

Laughed and jeered at by the enemy, Popeye eats his spinach and gives some to Bluto (can and all). Both men defeat the Japanese and Popeye's fist reaches so far that he knocks out Hirohito. The Emperor is hit so hard that he falls on the backside of his horse, (creating a pun on the word "horse's ass"), and says: "It should happen to Hitler!" Sure enough, it then transitions to Hitler, who gives a speech by saying: "B.O.!" ("body odor", a reference to a Lifebuoy soap commercial). Hitler too is punched so hard that he loses his mustache. A title card appears, asking: "Is there a doctor in the house?", with the word "doctor" crossed out and "undertaker" written in crayon. While he lies unconscious, Hermann Göring runs in and asks his Führer melodramatically "to speak to him". Hitler just says "B.O." again, whereupon Göring pulls his face away in disgust.

The cartoon concludes with Bluto finally deciding to sign up for the draft. When Bluto asks how to spell his own name, the imprisoned Japanese spies sing "B-L-U-T-O", in reference to the commercial jingle for Jell-o from that time.
