= J. Wellington Wimpy =

Fictional character from Popeye

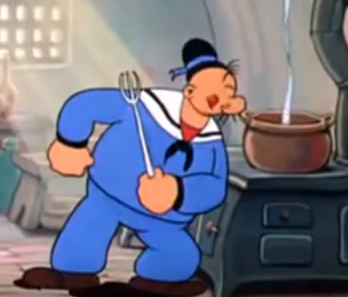
- Wimpy in Popeye the Sailor Meets Ali Baba's Forty Thieves (1937).

Publication information
- Publisher: King Features Syndicate
- First appearance: Thimble Theatre (May 3, 1931)
- Created by: E. C. Segar
- Voiced by: Charles Lawrence (1933); Lou Fleischer (1934–1940); Gilbert Mack (1955–1957); Jack Mercer (1960–1972); Daws Butler (1978); Allan Melvin (1987); Tim Kitzrow (Popeye Saves the Earth); J. J. Sedelmaier (Bagel Bites commercial); Wally Wingert (Popeye: The Rescue); Sanders Whiting (Popeye's Voyage: The Quest for Pappy)

In-story information
- Full name: J. Wellington Wimpy
- Notable aliases: Wimpy

J. Wellington Wimpy, generally referred to as Wimpy, is a character in the comic strip Popeye, created by E. C. Segar, and in the Popeye cartoons based upon the strip. Wimpy debuted in the strip in 1931 and was one of the dominant characters in the newspaper strip, but when Popeye was adapted as an animated cartoon series by Fleischer Studios, Wimpy became a minor character; Dave Fleischer said that the character in the original Segar strip was "too smart" to be used in the film cartoon adaptations. Wimpy appears in Robert Altman's 1980 live-action musical film Popeye, played by Paul Dooley.

== Inspiration ==
The character seems to have been inspired by more than one person whom Segar had encountered. Wimpy's personality was based upon that of William Schuchert, the manager of the Chester Opera House where Segar was first employed. "Windy Bill", as he was known, was a pleasant, friendly man, fond of tall tales and hamburgers.

Additional sources suggest that Segar composed the character's name from the names of two other acquaintances. According to fellow cartoonist Bill Mauldin, the name was suggested by that of Wellington J. Reynolds, one of Segar's instructors at the Chicago Art Institute. In a brief 1935 interview in The Daily Oklahoman, H. Hillard Wimpee of Atlanta indicated that he was connected to the character, having worked with Segar at the Chicago Herald-Examiner in 1917. It became a custom in the office that whoever accepted an invitation for a hamburger would pay the bill. According to Wimpee, after seeing the character in the newspaper, he wrote to Segar in 1932 about Wimpy, "afraid of being connected with what [Segar] was doing with [the character]." He said Segar replied, "You haven't seen anything yet."

== Character ==
Wimpy is Popeye's friend, and he plays the role of a self-centered foil to Popeye. Wimpy is a soft-spoken romantic, intelligent and educated, a lazy coward, a miser, and a glutton. He is a scam artist, and frequently bereft of either cash or lodging (due to both his lethargy and voracious appetite), but frequently feigns high social status (sporadically, and possibly inaccurately, referring to himself as a former college alumnus). Besides mooching hamburgers, he also picks up discarded cigars. Popeye often tries to reform Wimpy's character, but Wimpy never reforms.

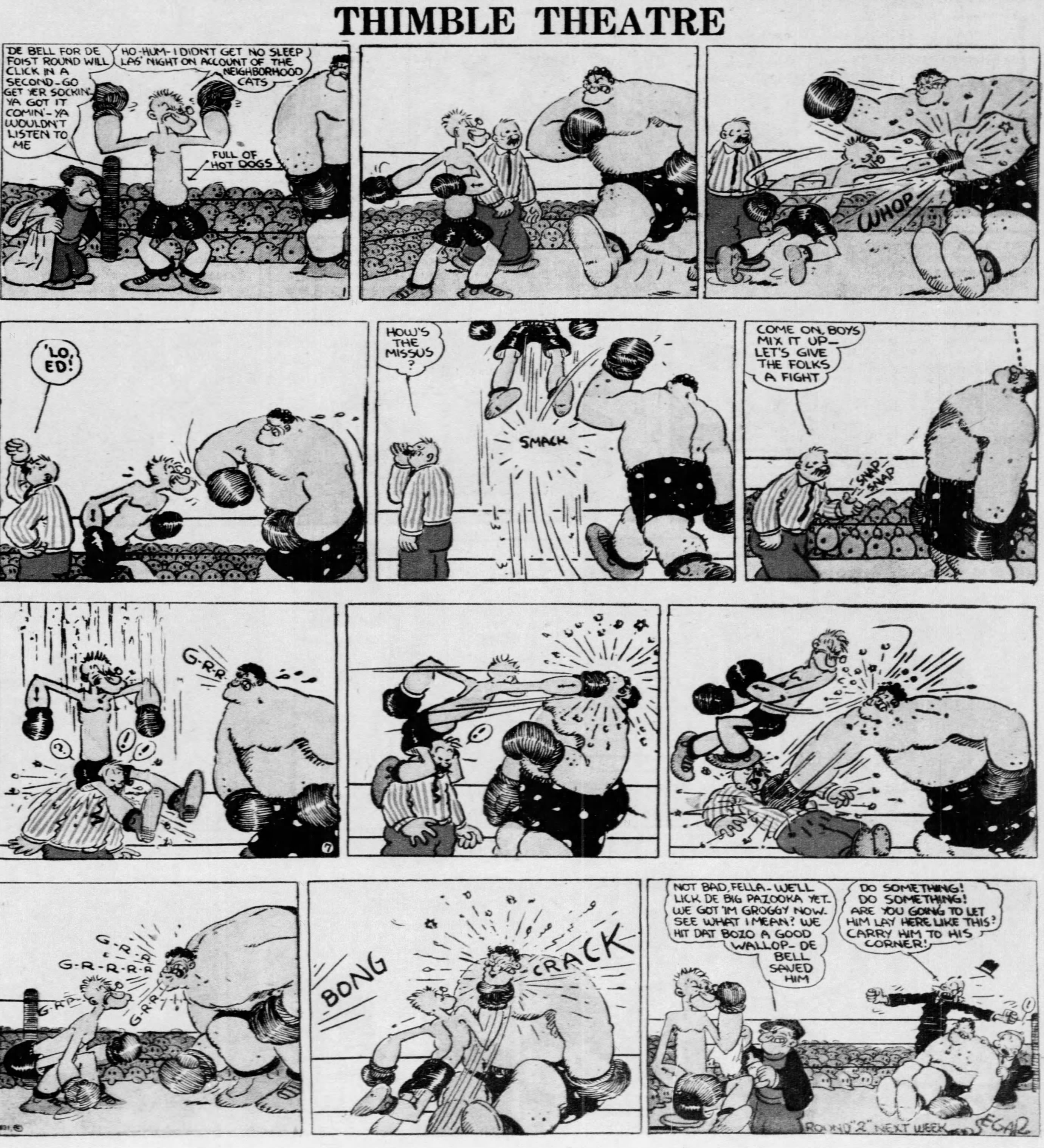
Wimpy's first appearance from the May 3rd 1931 strip of Thimble Theatre

Hamburgers are Wimpy's all-time favorite food, and he is usually seen carrying or eating one or more at a time, e.g., in Popeye the Sailor Meets Sindbad the Sailor he is seen grinding meat or eating burgers almost the entire time. However, he is usually too cheap or bankrupt to pay for them on his own. A recurring joke involves Wimpy's attempts to con other patrons of the diner owned by Rough House into buying his meal for him. His best-known catchphrase started in 1931 as, "Cook me up a hamburger. I'll pay you Tuesday." In March 1932, this then became the famous "I'll gladly pay you Tuesday for a hamburger today". The phrase is now commonly used to illustrate financial irresponsibility and still appears in modern comedies such as The Drew Carey Show and The Office. The initial part of the phrase was the title of Episode 6 of the fourth season of Cheers "I'll Gladly Pay You Tuesday.". The phrase was slightly altered in the 1957 animated short "Spree Lunch" to "I'll have a hamburger, for which I will gladly pay you Tuesday."

Rough House explains why Wimpy is able to get away with this tactic in one strip, stating that "He never comes around on Tuesday". Rough House once suffered a mental breakdown from Wimpy's shenanigans, and demanded that Wimpy be kept out of his hospital room. Wimpy disobeyed this command, resulting in a rare altercation with Popeye.

In Robert Altman's 1980 live-action musical film Popeye, where Wimpy was played by veteran character actor Paul Dooley, one of Harry Nilsson's original songs, "Everything Is Food", featured Dooley singing the catch-phrase, as he took a hamburger, as "I would gladly pay you Tuesday for a hamburger today." The response from the chorus, as they reclaimed the same hamburger from him, uneaten, was "He would gladly pay you Tuesday for a hamburger today." Later in the film, a sign in a restaurant reads "Positively NO CREDIT. Especially you, Wimpy!"

Wimpy had other frequently used lines in the original comic strip. On the occasion of another character (typically Popeye or Rough House) successfully paying for his meal, Wimpy tends to lavish romanticized appraisals upon them, frequently exclaiming "thank you too much" and, to Popeye, lauding him as a "friend" and the "gem of the ocean". Another such line was, "Jones is my name ... I'm one of the Jones boys" — an attempt to defuse a hostile situation with a mistaken identity. To deflect an enemy's wrath, he would sometimes indicate a third party and say, "Let's you and him fight", starting a brawl from which he would quickly withdraw. He also said "Shake hands, my friend ... I want to start my wristwatch" on occasion, once more a reference to his lazy behavior. Wimpy also frequently asks if someone has any mustard for his hamburger.

In disadvantageous circumstances, Wimpy tries to placate someone by saying, "I'd like to invite you over to my house for a duck dinner." He then moves away quickly to a safe distance and yells, "You bring the ducks!" Wimpy is especially fond of duck hunting, and goes hunting with Popeye on numerous occasions, but usually gains his ducks in dishonest ways as well.

== In popular culture ==
- Wimpy (along with Popeye, Olive and Bluto) was intended to have a cameo in Who Framed Roger Rabbit, but the rights to the characters could not be obtained.
- In the 1932 film If I Had a Million, three Marines played by Gary Cooper, Roscoe Karns, and Jack Oakie are sitting at a hamburger stand trying to buy hamburgers even though they are short of cash. Jack Oakie's character quotes Wimpy's standard line "I'll gladly pay you Tuesday for a hamburger today" with a smile to the man running the stand.
- During World War II, "Wimpy", in reference to the character, was the nickname given to the Vickers Wellington bomber.
- Wimpy is also the namesake of the large chain of Wimpy hamburger restaurants which was founded in Bloomington, Indiana in the 1930s and opened in the UK in 1954; it has maintained operations overseas since 1967. Their UK website states, "The name Wimpy is believed to have come from Popeye's friend J Wellington Wimpy who loved hamburgers as much as Popeye loved spinach."
  - This seems to apply also to his other International Aliases; In Italy, for example, many restaurants and fast-food joints are named "Poldo" or "Da Poldo", "Poldo" being Wimpy's Italian-adapted name.
- Wimpy can also be found as the mascot for "Wimpy's Seafood Restaurant and Market" in Osterville, Massachusetts on Cape Cod. (Established 1938)
- Wimpy made a cameo appearance in the context of beef-related heart disease from his affinity for hamburgers in the Family Guy episode "McStroke".
- Wimpy has appeared in two episodes of the Adult Swim animated series Robot Chicken, often using his "I'll gladly pay you Tuesday" line to buy hamburgers. Often it fails. He was voiced by Scott Adsit and Seth Green.
- In the Good Eats second-season episode "Daily Grind" (also known as "A Grind Is a Terrible Thing to Waste"), Alton Brown prepares the "perfect burger" (as well as meatloaf and meatballs) for a character named "J. Wellington Whimpy" (misspelled, but looking mostly like the version of Wimpy played by Paul Dooley in the Popeye film) played by then cast regular Steve Rooney.
- In the final Pooch the Pup cartoon called "She Done Him Right", a dog character looking like Wimpy is seen playing a slot machine.
- Wimpy's famous catchphrase gives the name to the hamburger review website A Hamburger Today.
- Wimpy is also the focus of an animated Bank of America commercial in which he uses a new smartphone app to finally pay for the food he mooched from his friends.
- Season 4 Episode 6 of Cheers is named "I'll Gladly Pay You Tuesday".
- Season 6 Episode 8 of Frasier, Niles refers to Claudia Kynock, a wealthy media owner, as a bulbous cartoon character who steals hamburgers. Frasier correctly asserts "Wimpy" but after Niles makes a series of self-deprecating remarks.
- Season 2 Episode 14 of The Office, Michael can be heard whispering to Stanley "I'll gladly pay you Tuesday for a hamburger today".
- In the hit video game World of Warcraft, an NPC named Topper McNabb can be heard repeating "I'll gladly pay you Tuesday for a hamburger today" in the city of Stormwind, among other phrases.
- In a May 12, 2020 9 Chickweed Lane strip, Wimpy's catchphrase was mentioned along with a thinly veiled romantic innuendo between characters Amos and Edda and also in a May 2, 2022 strip, this time involving recurring characters Hugh and Xiulan in the same manner.

== See also ==
- Edward Dando
- Mr Micawber
- Harold Skimpole
