= Polacolor =

Type of movie and still photo film

Polacolor was the trade name of two very different color photography products developed by the Polaroid Corporation.

== Motion picture print process ==
The first Polacolor was a post-World War II process for making 35mm color motion picture prints for theatrical use. It was a three-color dye coupler process that produced full-color images in a single photographic emulsion. As an alternative to the dominant Technicolor printing process, Polacolor had advantages over the contemporary Cinecolor process, which yielded two-color prints that reproduced only a limited range of colors and had the two component dye images in separate emulsions on the front and back of the film base.

While Polacolor did not see much use past short subjects and advertisements, Paramount Pictures used it for their Famous Studios animated short series Screen Songs, Popeye, and Noveltoons.

Polaroid discontinued the process around 1950.

== Instant still photography process ==
The second Polacolor was an instant film product introduced in 1963 for use in Polaroid instant cameras for still photography. It produced small one-off color prints on paper.

== See also ==
- Polaroid Corporation

== Sources ==
- Four Aspects of the Film by James L. Limbacher. 1968.
