= Chester Opera House =

Cinema and theatre in Illinois, US

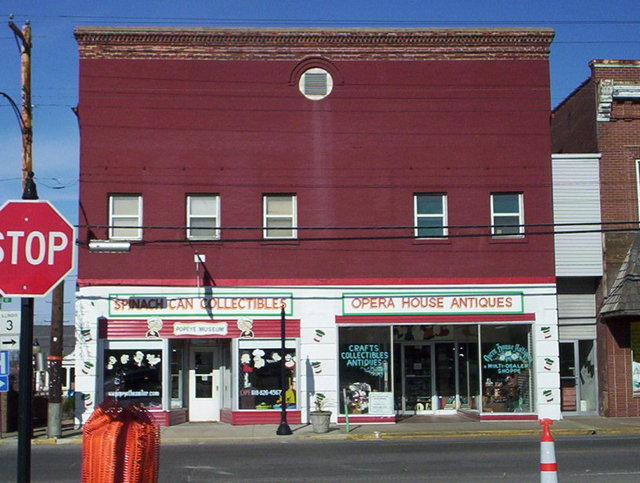
- Opera House Antiques
- Interactive map of Chester Opera House
- Alternative names: ChesterOpera

General information
- Type: Cinema and Theatre
- Location: 1001-3 State Street, Chester, IL 62233, Chester, Illinois, US
- Coordinates: 37°54′44.1″N 89°49′24.4″W

Other information
- Seating capacity: 650

Chester Opera House was a cinema and theatre which showed both movies and live stage performances in Chester, Illinois, US. Elzie Segar, the creator of Popeye, worked there from the age of twelve. The Chester Opera House was built in the late 19th century. It was converted to a movie house in about 1920s by its owner, Bill Schuchert.

== History ==
Chester Opera House was listed in the 1897–98 edition of the Julius Cahn Official Theatrical Guide, an annual for roadshow managers. The seating capacity was reported as 650.

Opera House was managed by Herman Wiebusch and Edw. Tindall and the range of ticket prices was 25 cents to 50 cents. The proscenium opening was 18 feet x 9 feet (width x height) and the depth of stage was 18 feet. The theatre was on the second floor and had electric illumination.

It was closed as a movie theatre in 1931, the old Opera House housed a museum and Popeye-themed gift shop.

Current owners, Debbie and Mike Brooks bought and renovated the Opera House into the Spinach Can Collectables gift shop and Chester Opera House museum back in 1994.

As of 2021, it is in use as a Spinach Can Collectables and antique store on the 1st floor and the former auditorium on the 2nd floor has been converted into apartments.
