= Lou Fleischer =

American arranger and composer (1891–1985)

- Born: July 16, 1891; New York City, U.S.
- Died: November 16, 1985 (aged 94); Los Angeles, California, U.S.
- Occupations: Arranger, composer
- Years active: 1923–1942
- Relatives: Max Fleischer (brother); Dave Fleischer (brother); Richard Fleischer (nephew); Seymour Kneitel (nephew-in-law)

Lou Fleischer (/ˈflaɪʃər/; July 16, 1891 – November 16, 1985) was an American arranger, composer, and the brother of Max and Dave Fleischer. He was the head of the Fleischer Studios Music Department until the company was reorganized as Famous Studios in 1942. He is thought to have been the voice of J. Wellington Wimpy in I Wanna Be a Lifeguard from the Popeye film series in 1936. But he denied ever having sung or spoken for the cartoons.

Following his dismissal at the changeover to Famous Studios, Fleischer worked as a Lens Grinder for the World War II effort, and later worked for the Army Signal Corps Film Unit in New York. For a short period in the 1940s he did scoring for George Pal and taught piano while residing in Redondo Beach, California until his retirement in the late 1960s. He died in 1985.
