= Gus Wickie =

American actor (1885–1947)

- Born: August Wicke; May 7, 1885; Barmen, Germany
- Died: January 3, 1947 (aged 61); Belleville, New Jersey, U.S.
- Occupations: Singer, stage actor, voice actor
- Years active: 1916–1944

August Wicke (May 7, 1885 – January 3, 1947), also known as Gus Wicke and Gus Wickie, was an American bass singer and stage and voice actor. He was one of the voices of Bluto in the animated series, Popeye the Sailor, by Fleischer Studios.

== Life and career ==
Wicke was born in Frankfurt, Germany, and immigrated to the United States with his father, who was also named August Wicke. He became a U.S. citizen as a child when his father was naturalized. He was living in West New York, when he registered for the World War I draft in 1917.

Wicke began in the entertainment world as early as August 1916, when he appeared on Broadway in The Big Show, produced by Charles Dillingham at the Hippodrome Theatre. The show ran for 425 performances until May 1917. He was a member of various harmony singing and comedy groups, including The Texas Four, which had broken up by 1926; The Westerners, which became active at around that time; and the Shanley Trio. He appeared in Boston in Here and There by director and producer R. H. Burnside in 1929. Two years later, Wickie was on Broadway in the musical comedy Ballyhoo of 1930, which ran for 68 performances, from December 1930 to February 1931, at Oscar Hammerstein's Hammerstein Theatre.

Wickie was the voice of Bluto in the Fleischer Studios' Popeye cartoons from 1935 until 1938. His final performance for Fleischer was as the "Chief" in Big Chief Ugh-Amugh-Ugh. His draft registration documents indicate that he was one eyed, like Bluto's nemesis Popeye (as his name implies).

When Fleischer Studios moved from New York City to Miami, Florida, in 1938, Wickie stayed behind and continued working in the entertainment industry. An oft-cited biographical error is that Wickie was a baritone, recordings of his voice indicate he was a bass singer according to his dark timbre and vocal range, which go down to at least low C, as do published reports contemporary with his rediscovered later career according to research by David Gerstein.

Wickie was known for his nightclub performances around New York City, particularly at Bill's Gay Nineties, a venue run by Bill Hardy, but also at Radio Franks Club. Wicke generally made up a quartet with Spike Harrison, Fred Bishop, and a fourth member who was not permanent. He was listed in Billboard's February 19, 1944, list of performers who appeared under the aegis of the American Theatre Wing to entertain the troops.

Wickie died in Belleville, New Jersey, on January 3, 1947, at the age of 61.
