= Jack Mercer =

American voice actor (1910–1984)

- Mercer in 1978
- Born: Winfield Bennett Mercer; January 31, 1910; Worthington, Indiana, U.S.
- Died: December 7, 1984 (aged 74); New York City, U.S.
- Occupations: Voice actor; animator; screenwriter
- Years active: 1932–1984
- Notable work: Popeye the Sailor
- Spouses: Margie Hines (m. 1939; div. 1950) Virginia Caroll (m. 1950)

Winfield Bennett Mercer (January 31, 1910 – December 7, 1984), known professionally as Jack Mercer, was an American voice actor. He is best known as the voice of cartoon characters Popeye the Sailor Man and Felix the Cat. The son of vaudeville and Broadway performers, he also performed on the vaudeville and legitimate stages.

== Popeye the Sailor ==
Mercer began his work in cartoons as an "inbetweener", an apprentice animator at Fleischer Studios. Mercer liked to imitate voices, including one close call when he mimicked the high-pitched and loud voice of the wife of one of the Fleischers after he mistakenly thought she had left the studio.

When his predecessor William Costello, the original cartoon voice of Popeye (1933–1935), became difficult to work with, he was dismissed. Mercer had begun imitating Costello's interpretation of Popeye, and he practiced it until his voice "cracked" just right and he had it down. Searching for a replacement for Costello, Lou Fleischer heard Mercer singing the Popeye theme song and gave him the job of doing the voice. Mercer's first cartoon was 1935's King of the Mardi Gras.

Mercer voiced Popeye for more than 40 years, first for the Fleischers, then for Paramount's Famous Studios cartoons (1942–1957), then for a series of television cartoons for King Features Syndicate (1961), and finally for a Saturday-morning cartoon show (1978–1983) produced by William Hanna and Joseph Barbera. Mercer also read the lines for the opening segment of the 1980 live action film; the film's regular role of Popeye was played by Robin Williams.

== Other voice work ==
Mercer also did other cartoon voices. In the Popeye cartoons he also voiced Wimpy, Poopdeck Pappy, and Popeye's nephews. For Fleischer's feature film Gulliver's Travels he voiced King Little, Twinkletoes the carrier pigeon, and the bumbling spies Sneak, Snoop, and Snitch. He played supporting characters Mr. Bumble and Swat (the Fly) for Fleischer's second feature Mister Bug Goes to Town. He was also regularly cast with Pinto Colvig (who voiced Gabby from Gulliver's Travels and the spinoff Gabby film series). Mercer also played numerous supporting characters in Fleischer's Superman series of 1941–1942. Mercer's natural voice was relatively high-pitched for a man, and he was able to do some of the female voices as well.

Beginning in 1958 Mercer also provided all the voices for the Felix the Cat TV cartoons, including The Professor and Rock Bottom, produced by former Paramount animator Joe Oriolo. Mercer later worked with Oriolo on The Mighty Hercules.

In addition to his vocal talents, Mercer was also a prolific comedy writer. He wrote hundreds of scripts for various cartoon series at Fleischer Studios and Famous Studios, including a number of Popeye episodes, as well as for television's Deputy Dawg and Milton the Monster.

Jack Mercer appeared as himself on a 1973 episode of To Tell the Truth, receiving one of four possible votes.

== Personal life ==
Mercer's first wife was Margie Hines, who provided the voice of Olive Oyl from 1939 to 1944. They were divorced in 1950. He later married Virginia Caroll, and the couple remained married until Mercer's death in 1984.

Originally a resident of New York City, Mercer moved to Miami, Florida, when Fleischer Studios relocated there in 1938. After Famous Studios took over the Popeye cartoons, Mercer moved back to New York by early 1944. In the late 1970s he lived briefly in Los Angeles but moved back to New York City to live in Woodside, Queens.

== Death ==
Mercer died at Lenox Hill Hospital in Manhattan on December 7, 1984, after stomach cancer-related problems.

== Filmography ==
=== Voice acting ===
Year	Title	Role	Notes
1935–1957	Popeye the Sailor	Popeye	Voice, uncredited
1939	Gulliver's Travels	King Little / Royal Chef / Snoop	Voice, Uncredited
1941	Mr. Bug Goes to Town	Mr. Bumble / Swat / Insects	Voice
1942	Superman	Office boy	Voice, episode: Showdown
1958–1961	Felix the Cat	All characters	Voice, 130 episodes
1960–1963	Popeye the Sailor	Popeye / Wimpy / Poopdeck Pappy	Voice
1963	The New Casper Cartoon Show	Bear / Stork / Spooky	Voice, 2 episodes
1963–1964	The Mighty Hercules	Newton / Daedalus / Teron / Additional voices	Voice, 12 episodes
1965–1968	Milton the Monster	Additional voices	Voice
1972	Popeye Meets the Man Who Hated Laughter	Popeye / Wimpy	Voice
1978–1983	The All New Popeye Hour	Popeye / Poopdeck Pappy / Pipeye / Peepeye	Voice, recurring role
1980	Popeye	Popeye - Animated Prologue	Voice (final role)

=== Writer ===
Year	Title	Notes
1942–1957	Popeye the Sailor	Story writer
1960–1961	Popeye the Sailor	19 episodes
1963	The Deputy Dawg Show	2 episodes
1965–1968	Milton the Monster	
1978	Dinky Dog	16 episodes
1978–1981	The All-New Popeye Hour	
