= Seymour Kneitel =

American animator (1908–1964)

- Born: March 16, 1908; New York City, U.S.
- Died: July 30, 1964 (aged 56); New York City, U.S.
- Years active: 1923–1964
- Spouse: Ruth Fleischer (m. 1931)
- Children: 3
- Relatives: Max Fleischer (father-in-law); Lou Fleischer (uncle-in-law); Dave Fleischer (uncle-in-law); Richard Fleischer (brother-in-law); Abner Kneitel (cousin)

Seymour Kneitel (March 16, 1908 – July 30, 1964) was an American animator, best known for his work with Fleischer Studios and its successor, Famous Studios.

== Early years ==
Kneitel was born in New York City where he graduated from P.S. 10 in Manhattan and attended the High School of Commerce, taking commercial art courses. He also took evening classes at the National Academy of Design. His father died when Kneitel was still in high school, and he needed work to provide support for his mother and sister.

He was able to attend an annex of Commerce HS and work after school and Saturdays for Bray Studios, coloring drawings for Colonel Heeza Liar cartoons. On graduation, he was able to find employment with a small company, L.F. Cornwell, producers of a series called Ebinizer Ebony, which were being made in a now-defunct color process known as Kelly Color. He began as an office boy and within a year was one of three animators. From 1925 to 1927, he worked as an inbetweener at Max Fleischer's "Out of the Inkwell" Studio, and was there for two years when he was offered a position at Metro-Goldwyn-Mayer studios in California as a junior writer.

Kneitel spent six months at MGM writing sub-titles for silent pictures, but was dismissed when sound pictures arrived. Heading back East he worked briefly for an outfit that produced cartoons based on the popular Joe Jinks comic strips (the cartoons never were seen publicly). In 1928 he worked for six months at Loucks and Norling on industrial films and the Mutt and Jeff series.

== Fleischer Studios ==
In 1928, Kneitel returned to Fleischer Studios as an inbetweener, staying there for fourteen years (1928–1942), He was there only about six months when he became an animator, and a year later became a head animator. During his time there he provided animation for many films, including the Betty Boop and Popeye the Sailor series, Talkartoons, Screen Songs (with the famous "bouncing ball"), and the studio's first feature-length film, Gulliver's Travels.

In early 1939, Kneitel suffered a heart attack, and would be absent from the studio until late 1940. Kneitel returned just when Fleischer obtained the right to animate Superman. Kneitel wrote several Superman episodes with Isadore (Izzy) Sparber, and directed one short, The Mechanical Monsters (1941).

In January 1942, the Fleischer brothers were forced to resign from the studio they had created; they had borrowed money from Paramount between 1938 and 1941 to finance their expanded Miami facilities and two feature films. After the failure of their second feature, Mister Bug Goes to Town, the studio called in their loans, effectively foreclosing the studio. The successor studio was re-formed by Kneitel, Sam Buchwald and Isadore Sparber and renamed it Famous Studios.

== Famous Studios ==
Kneitel, Buchwald and Sparber ran Famous Studios for 11 years (1942–1953), after which Paramount Pictures subsidized the studio, and Kneitel was employed as director of production. Kneitel himself had become one of the most prolific directors of the Popeye shorts and also directed many of the Casper the Friendly Ghost shorts. Famous Studios also created a series called Noveltoons that included the three popular series; Casper the Friendly Ghost, Herman and Katnip and Baby Huey. He produced cartoons until the day he died.

== Popeye the Sailor TV series ==
In the summer of 1957, Paramount ceased production of theatrical Popeye shorts. King Features Syndicate, aware of the high ratings that the Popeye shorts had earned on television, commissioned a new series of Popeye shorts for syndication in 1960. Kneitel, head of the Paramount Cartoon Studios (renamed from Famous Studios in 1956), supervised one of four animation units assigned to this project. Due to the usage of limited animation, the quality of these films is inferior to those produced by the Fleischer and Famous Studios.

== Personal life ==
Kneitel was married to Ruth Fleischer, becoming Max Fleischer's son-in-law, Dave Fleischer’s nephew-in-law, and director Richard Fleischer's brother-in-law. He was also the nephew of musician Sammy Timberg, who wrote many of the scores for Fleischer's cartoons. Kneitel also had a cousin Abner Kneitel, who was the animator and assistant animator for Fleischers and Famous from 1935 to 1944. Abner was often credited as "Abner Matthews" in cartoons he worked on alongside Seymour.

His son Tom Fleischer-Kneitel, an avid amateur radio operator, was the founding editor of Popular Communications magazine. His daughter, Virginia, headed a design and exhibition office for the Smithsonian Institution. Seymour's youngest son, Kenneth, a major collector of vintage material, established and ran the store 'Fandango' in New York City. Kenneth also designed and published many books, and worked several years for Peter Max.

== Death ==
Kneitel suffered a major heart attack in March 1941, caused by his chain smoking. Kneitel continued to have health problems throughout his life. In his 2005 book Out of the Inkwell, Richard Fleischer alleged that Paramount stratigically appointed the constantly sick Kneitel to run Famous Studios, as a way to prevent Max Fleischer from pursuing legal action against them over the loss of his studio. Kneitel died of a second heart attack on July 30, 1964, at the age of 56. Three years later, Paramount shut down the animation studio. Kneitel's last cartoon credit was Space Kid (1966).
