= Isadore Sparber =

American film director (1906–1958)

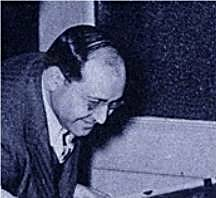
- Sparber in 1944
- Born: March 7, 1906; New York City, U.S.
- Died: August 29, 1958 (aged 52); New York City, U.S.
- Years active: 1930s–1958
- Children: 1

Isadore Sparber (March 7, 1906 – August 29, 1958) was an American animator, writer, director and producer of animated films. He is known for his work with Fleischer Studios and its successor, Famous Studios. When credited, his work appeared under varying versions of his name, including Izzy Sparber, I. Sparber, Irving Sparber, Isidore Sparber, and Isadore Sparber.

== Career ==
Sparber worked for Fleischer Studios in the 1930s and early 1940s where much of his early work was uncredited. However, he was credited as a writer for several Superman cartoons (all with Seymour Kneitel), as well as the feature-length films Gulliver's Travels and Mr. Bug Goes to Town. He also wrote some Betty Boop cartoons, Color Classics cartoons and Popeye cartoons with no credit. Sparber was first mentioned in a Popeye cartoon as the namesake for a demolition company, Sparber Destruction Co., in the cartoon Quiet! Pleeze (1941). When Paramount Pictures took over Fleischer Studios in 1942, Sparber, Kneitel, and Dan Gordon were named as the new heads of the renamed Famous Studios.

Despite working without onscreen credit for most of his tenure with the Fleischers, Sparber is credited with producing or co-producing nearly 400 cartoons afterward, and directed at least 160 of them. Aside from Sparber directing several Popeye shorts, he was also directly responsible for numerous entries in Famous Studios' Noveltoons, Superman, Little Lulu and Casper the Friendly Ghost series.

== Death ==
Sparber died on August 29, 1958, in New York City at the age of 52. It has been said that this may have been a factor in Paramount's 1959 decision to discontinue production of several cartoon series and sell the rights to Harvey Comics, but apparently this is not the case. During the reorganization of Famous Studios into Paramount Cartoon Studios in late 1956, Sparber was fired along with a number of other veteran Famous Studios staffers as a measure to cut costs. That Sparber continued to collect credits long after he was fired was a result of the long gestation time in animation; Sparber's last cartoon, "Travelaffs", opened on August 22, 1958, one week before his death.

== Filmography ==
- ’Parlez Vous Woo’ (Popeye, 1956 short)
