= Popeye the Sailor filmography (Fleischer Studios) =

This is a list of the 109 cartoons of the Popeye the Sailor film series produced by Fleischer Studios for Paramount Pictures from 1933 to 1942.

During the course of production in 1941, Paramount assumed control of the Fleischer studio, removing founders Max and Dave Fleischer from control of the studio and renaming the organization Famous Studios by 1942. Popeye cartoons continued production under Famous Studios following 1942's Baby Wants a Bottleship.

All cartoons are one reel (6 to 10 minutes long) and in black and white, except for the three Popeye Color Specials (Popeye the Sailor Meets Sindbad the Sailor from 1936, Popeye the Sailor Meets Ali Baba's Forty Thieves from 1937, and Aladdin and His Wonderful Lamp from 1939), which are two reels (15 to 20 minutes long) and in Technicolor.

Dave Fleischer was the credited director on every cartoon produced by Fleischer Studios. Fleischer's actual duties were those of a film producer and creative supervisor, with the head animators doing much of the work assigned to animation directors in other studios. The head animator is the first animator listed. Credited animators are therefore listed for each short.

== Short films ==
=== 1933 ===
#	Film	Original release date	Animated by	Story by	Film if in the public domain
Pilot cartoon	Popeye the Sailor	July 14	Seymour Kneitel; Roland Crandall		
First screen appearances of Popeye, Olive Oyl, and Bluto; A Betty Boop cartoon; Some TV versions are edited so as to remove scenes depicting racial stereotypes of African Americans; Billy Costello was the first voice of Popeye.
1	I Yam What I Yam	September 29	Seymour Kneitel; William Henning		
First entry in the Popeye the Sailor series; First screen appearance of J. Wellington Wimpy; Rarely airs on television due to the American Indian stereotypes.
2	Blow Me Down!	October 27	Willard Bowsky; William Sturm		
3	I Eats My Spinach	November 17	Seymour Kneitel; Roland Crandall		
First cartoon with Mae Questel as the voice of Olive Oyl; William Pennell voices Bluto; Additional voices are provided by Charles Carver; Only Popeye cartoon to bear the National Recovery Administration logo
4	Seasin's Greetinks!	December 17	Seymour Kneitel; Roland Crandall		
5	Wild Elephinks	December 29	Willard Bowsky; William Sturm		
=== 1934 ===
6	Sock-a-Bye, Baby	January 19	Seymour Kneitel; Roland Crandall		
Baby voiced by Mae Questel; Billy Costello voices Popeye
7	Let's You and Him Fight	February 16	Willard Bowsky; William Sturm		
Final appearance of the Out of the Inkwell end title design.
8	The Man on the Flying Trapeze	March 16	Willard Bowsky; David Tendlar		
Cameo appearance by Nana Oyl (voiced by Mae Questel); Jules Leotard (aka the Man on the Flying Trapeze) is voiced by Gus Wickie; Additional voices are provided by Lou Fleischer and Charles Carver
9	Can You Take It	April 27	Myron Waldman; Thomas Johnson		
William Pennell voices Bluto; Margie Hines voices Olive Oyl; Additional voices are provided by Charles Carver; The first female studio animator, Lillian Friedman, animated several scenes in this film.
10	Shoein' Hosses	June 1	Willard Bowsky; David Tendlar		
William Pennell voices Bluto; Mae Questel voices Olive Oyl; Charles Lawrence voices Wimpy; Additional voices are provided by Charles Carver; First cartoon in which Popeye and Bluto compete for work
11	Strong to the Finich	June 29	Seymour Kneitel; Roland Crandall		
Bonnie Poe (or Mae Questel) voices Olive Oyl; Mae Questel voices Children; Final appearance of the "Max Fleischer presents" byline
12	Shiver Me Timbers!	July 27	Willard Bowsky; William Sturm		
Mae Questel voices Olive Oyl; Charles Lawrence voices Wimpy; Additional voices are provided by Lou Fleischer
13	Axe Me Another	August 21	Seymour Kneitel; Roland Crandall		
Mae Questel voices Olive Oyl; William Pennell voices Bluto; Additional voices are provided by Charles Carver
14	A Dream Walking	September 26	Seymour Kneitel; Roland Crandall		
Mae Questel voices Olive Oyl; William Pennell voices Bluto; Lou Fleischer voices Wimpy; Additional voices are provided by Charles Carver
15	The Two-Alarm Fire	October 26	Willard Bowsky; Nicholas Tafuri		
Mae Questel voices Olive Oyl; William Pennell voices Bluto; Additional voices are provided by Charles Carver
16	The Dance Contest	November 23	Willard Bowsky; David Tendlar		
Mae Questel voices Olive Oyl; William Pennell voices Bluto; Charles Lawrence voices Wimpy; Additional voices are provided by Charles Carver and Louis Fleischer
17	We Aim to Please	December 28	Willard Bowsky; David Tendlar		
William Pennell voices Bluto; Charles Lawrence voices Wimpy; Additional voices are provided by Charles Carver & Lou Fleischer
=== 1935 ===
18	Beware of Barnacle Bill	January 25	Willard Bowsky; Harold M. Walker		
First use of the "anchor" end title design.
19	Be Kind to "Aminals"	February 22	Willard Bowsky; Charles Hastings		
Floyd Buckley (the voice of Popeye on the Popeye radio program) voices Popeye
20	Pleased to Meet Cha!	March 22	Willard Bowsky; Harold Walker		
Billy Costello voices Popeye; Mae Questel voices Olive Oyl; Additional voices by Charles Carver; First cartoon to end with Popeye singing the closing theme song
21	The "Hyp-Nut-Tist"	April 26	Seymour Kneitel; Roland Crandall		
Last cartoon with William Pennell as Bluto
22	Choose Your "Weppins"	May 31	David Tendlar; George Germanetti (credited); Sam Stimson; Nick Tafuri; William "Bill" Sturm; Graham Place (uncredited)	Dave Fleischer; Izzy Sparber (uncredited)	
Mae Questel voices Olive Oyl; Gus Wickie voices a Prisoner; Charles Lawrence voices Wimpy; Additional voices are provided by Jack Mercer
23	For Better or Worser	June 28	Seymour Kneitel; Roland Crandall		
Mae Questel voices Olive Oyl; First cartoon with Gus Wickie as Bluto; Additional voices are provided by Lou Fleischer; First Popeye cartoon with stereoptical (3D background) process.
24	Dizzy Divers	July 26	Willard Bowsky; Harold Walker (credited); Nick Tafuri; George Germanetti; Graham Place; Bill Sturm (uncredited)	Dave Fleischer; Bill Turner; Joe Stultz (both uncredited)	
Bonnie Poe voices Olive Oyl; Gus Wickie voices Bluto; Additional voices are provided by Jack Mercer
25	You Gotta Be a Football Hero	August 31	Willard Bowsky; George Germanetti	Bill Turner (uncredited)	
Billy Costello's last performance as the voice of Popeye; Mae Questel voices Olive Oyl; Gus Wickie voices Bluto; Additional voices by Jack Mercer; Additional animation by Bill Sturm, Harold Walker, Nick Tafuri and Orestes Calpini
26	King of the Mardi Gras	September 27	David Tendlar; William Sturm; Graham Place; Nick Tafuri; Harold Walker; Eli Brucker (uncredited)	Dave Fleischer; Izzy Sparber (uncredited)	
First cartoon with Jack Mercer as the voice of Popeye; Mae Questel voices Olive Oyl; Song "I'm King of the Mardi Gras" written by Sammy Timberg & Bob Rothberg and performed by Jack Mercer & Gus Wickie (as Bluto); Stereoptical process
27	Adventures of Popeye	October 25	Various		
Partial live-action; Mae Questel voices Olive Oyl; Gus Wickie voices Bluto; Compilation film, scenes from I Eats My Spinach, Wild Elephinks, Axe Me Another, and Popeye the Sailor
28	The Spinach Overture	December 7	Seymour Kneitel; Roland Crandall		
Cameo appearance by Castor Oyl; All other voices are provided by Jack Mercer; Mae Questel voices Olive Oyl; Gus Wickie voices Bluto; Charles Lawrence voices Wimpy; Music by Sammy Timberg
=== 1936 ===
29	Vim, Vigor and Vitaliky	January 3	Seymour Kneitel; Roland Crandall		
Mae Questel voices Olive Oyl; Gus Wickie voices Bluto
30	A Clean Shaven Man	February 7	Seymour Kneitel; Roland Crandall		
Cameo appearance by George G. Geezil; Additional animation by William Henning and Jack Kirby; Music by Sammy Timberg; This cartoon's theme music was used as the theme music for the local New Orleans kids show "Popeye & Pals", airing on WWL-TV 4 from 1957 to 1991
31	Brotherly Love	March 6	Seymour Kneitel; Roland Crandall		
Mae Questel voices Olive Oyl; Gus Wickie voices Bruiser
32	I-Ski Love-Ski You-Ski	April 3	Willard Bowsky; George Germanetti		
Mae Questel voices Olive Oyl; Gus Wickie voices Bluto; Additional animation by Edward Nolan and Orestes Calpini; Stereoptical process
33	Bridge Ahoy!	May 1	Seymour Kneitel; Roland Crandall	Elsworth Barthen	
Mae Questel voices Olive Oyl; Gus Wickie voices Bluto; Lou Fleischer voices Wimpy; Additional animation by William Henning; Stereoptical process
34	What--No Spinach?	June 7	Seymour Kneitel; Roland Crandall		
Gus Wickie voices Bluto; Lou Fleischer voices Wimpy
35	I Wanna Be a Life Guard	June 26	David Tendlar; William Sturm (credited); Joe Oriolo; Eli Brucker; Nick Tafuri; Graham Place (uncredited)	Ed Watkins; Jack Ward; Joe Stultz (all uncredited)	
Mae Questel voices Olive Oyl; Gus Wickie voices Bluto; Lou Fleischer voices Wimpy; Additional animation by Joe Oriolo; Stereoptical process
36	Let's Get Movin'	July 24	Willard Bowsky; Orestes Calpini	Joe Stultz; Bill Turner	
Mae Questel voices Olive Oyl; Gus Wickie voices Bluto; Stereoptical process
37	Never Kick a Woman	August 30	Seymour Kneitel; Roland Crandall		
First and only Fleischer cartoon in which Olive Oyl eats spinach in order to overcome a female adversary
38	Little Swee'Pea	September 25	Seymour Kneitel; William Henning		
First screen appearance of Swee'Pea; Stereoptical process; In the public domain in the United States; Earliest public domain Popeye cartoon.
39	Hold the Wire	October 23	Willard Bowsky; Orestes Calpini		
40	The Spinach Roadster	October 26	Willard Bowsky; George Germanetti	Bill Turner; Joe Stultz; Ed Watkins; Warren Foster; Jack Mercer (all uncredited)	
Stereoptical process; Additional animation by Orestes Calpini and Edward Nolan
41	Popeye the Sailor Meets Sindbad the Sailor	November 27	Willard Bowsky; George Germanetti; Edward Nolan		
A two-reel Popeye Color Special; Stereoptical process; Popeye's first color appearance; In the public domain in the United States; Final cartoon where Popeye sings his full theme song whenever he first appears.; Only Popeye cartoon nominated for an Academy Award for Short Subjects.
42	I'm in the Army Now	December 25	Various		
Gus Wickie voices Bluto; Mae Questel voices Olive Oyl; Frank Matalone voices Recruiting Officer; Compilation film, scenes from Blow Me Down, Choose Your "Weppins", Shoein' Hosses, and King of the Mardi Gras; In the public domain in the United States
=== 1937 ===
43	The Paneless Window Washer	January 22	Willard Bowsky; Orestes Calpini		
In the public domain in the United States
44	Organ Grinder's Swing	February 19	David Tendlar; William Sturm		
Mae Questel voices Olive Oyl; Gus Wickie voices Bluto; Additional voices by Donald Bain; Music by Sammy Timberg, Will Hudson, Mitchell Parish and Irving Mills; The DVD restoration of this cartoon incorrectly copies credits from The Paneless Window Washer, hence the incorrect certificate number, including Willard Bowsky and Orestes Calpini being wrongly credited for the animation.
45	My Artistical Temperature	March 19	Seymour Kneitel; Abner Matthews	Bill Turner; Joe Stultz; Ed Watkins (all uncredited)	
Mae Questel voices Olive Oyl; Gus Wickie voices Bluto; Stereoptical process; Some TV versions, as well as the colorized version, are edited so as to remove the scene where Popeye (voiced by Jack Mercer) turns Bluto's sun picture into a black-faced minstrel.
46	Hospitaliky	April 16	Seymour Kneitel; William Henning	Seymour Kneitel (uncredited)	
Mae Questel voices Olive Oyl; Gus Wickie voices Bluto; Popeye feeds Bluto spinach in order to get beaten up and put in the hospital with Olive
47	The Twisker Pitcher	May 21	Seymour Kneitel; Abner Matthews	Dave Fleischer; Seymour Kneitel (both uncredited)	
Bluto (voiced by Gus Wickie) eats Popeye's spinach in order to best him at baseball; Jack Mercer voices Popeye; Mae Questel voices Olive Oyl; Additional voices are provided by Louis Fleischer; Additional animation by William Henning
48	Morning, Noon and Nightclub	June 18	Willard Bowsky; George Germanetti	Dave Fleischer (uncredited)	
Popeye and Olive are known as Popita and Olivita in this cartoon; Jack Mercer voices Popeye; Mae Questel voices Olive Oyl; Gus Wickie voices Bluto; Lou Fleischer voices Wimpy; Music by Sammy Timberg
49	Lost and Foundry	July 16	Seymour Kneitel; Abner Matthews		
First time that Swee'Pea eats spinach to save the day; Jack Mercer voices Popeye; Mae Questel voices Olive Oyl and Swee'Pea
50	I Never Changes My Altitude	August 20	Willard Bowsky; Orestes Calpini		
Stereoptical process; In the public domain in the United States; Popeye (voiced by Jack Mercer) feeds a Bird spinach; Mae Questel voices Olive Oyl; Gus Wickie voices Bluto
51	I Likes Babies and Infinks	September 18	Seymour Kneitel; Graham Place		
Popeye doesn't eat spinach in this cartoon; Mae Questel voices Olive Oyl and Swee'Pea; Gus Wickie voices Bluto
52	The Football Toucher Downer	October 15	Seymour Kneitel; Graham Place		
Film produced by Max Fleischer, Isadore Sparber and Sam Buchwald; First vocal appearance of Jackson Beck (as a Young Bluto) in a Popeye cartoon; Mae Questel voices Swee'Pea and Young Olive Oyl
53	Protek the Weakerist	November 19	Seymour Kneitel; William Henning		
Stereoptical process; Film produced by Max Fleischer, Sam Buchwald and Isadore Sparber; Jack Mercer voices Popeye, Bluto's Bulldog; Mae Questel voices Olive Oyl, Fluffy the Dog; Gus Wickie voices Bluto; The TV print distributed by Associated Artists Productions (a.a.p.) atypically had original titles.
54	Popeye the Sailor Meets Ali Baba's Forty Thieves	November 26	Willard Bowsky; George Germanetti; Orestes Calpini		
A two-reel Popeye Color Special; Stereoptical process; Shows Popeye serving in the U.S. Coast Guard; In the public domain in the United States
55	Fowl Play	December 17	David Tendlar; William Sturm		
Film produced by Max Fleischer, Isadore Sparber & Sam Buchwald; Jack Mercer also voices Polly Parrot; Mae Questel voices Olive Oyl; Gus Wickie voices Bluto; On April 21, 1938, a censor banned the entire short in Nazi Germany for unknown reasons. Paramount officials in New York said that "there was nothing wrong in both the picture and the dialogue which could be interpreted as an affront to Germany".
=== 1938 ===
56	Let's Celebrake	January 21	Seymour Kneitel; William Henning		
Film produced by Max Fleischer, Isadore Sparber and Sam Buchwald; Mae Questel voices Olive Oyl and Grandma Oyl; Gus Wickie voices Bluto; Additional voices by Lou Fleischer; One of the rare times Popeye and Bluto are friends and don't fight in a cartoon
57	Learn Polikeness	February 18	David Tendlar; Nicholas Tafuri		
Stereoptical process; Mae Questel voices Olive Oyl; Final cartoon with Gus Wickie as the voice of Bluto (known as Professor Bluteau in this cartoon)
58	The House Builder-Upper	March 18	Seymour Kneitel; Abner Matthews		
Film produced by Max Fleischer, Sam Buchwald and Isadore Sparber; Mae Questel voices Olive Oyl; Charles Lawrence voices Wimpy; Additional voices are provided by Margie Hines; Additional animation by William Henning
59	Big Chief Ugh-Amugh-Ugh	April 25	Willard Bowsky; George Germanetti		
Gus Wickie voices Big Chief Ugh-Amugh-Ugh; Final cartoon to feature the voice of Gus Wickie as a main character
60	I Yam Love Sick	May 29	Seymour Kneitel; William Henning		
Film produced by Max Fleischer, Sam Buchwald and Isadore Sparber; Mae Questel voices Olive Oyl; Bluto has a cameo as a photograph that briefly comes to life just to laugh at Popeye, using archive sound of Gus Wickie
61	Plumbing is a "Pipe"	June 17	Willard Bowsky; Orestes Calpini		
Margie Hines voices Olive Oyl; Additional voices by Louis Fleischer
62	The Jeep	July 15	Seymour Kneitel; Graham Place		
First screen appearance of Eugene the Jeep
63	Bulldozing the Bull	August 19	Willard Bowsky; George Germanetti		
Margie Hines voices Olive Oyl
64	Mutiny Ain't Nice	September 23	David Tendlar; William Sturm		
65	Goonland	October 21	Seymour Kneitel; Abner Matthews		
First screen appearance of Poopdeck Pappy (voiced by Jack Mercer); All of the other voices are also provided by Jack Mercer; First film appearance of the Goons
66	A Date to Skate	November 18	Willard Bowsky; Orestes Calpini		
Final Fleischer cartoon with Mae Questel as the voice of Olive Oyl. Margie Hines takes over the role for all remaining Fleischer Popeye cartoons.; Final Fleischer Popeye cartoon produced in New York City; Breaks the fourth wall; In the public domain in the United States
67	Cops is Always Right	December 30	Seymour Kneitel; William Henning		
Margie Hines voices Olive Oyl; Cop voiced by Frank Matalone; Final cartoon to feature the original "ship door" opening and closing titles; Final appearance of the "Adolph Zukor presents" byline; First Fleischer Popeye cartoon produced in Miami, Florida; A new version of the "I'm Popeye the Sailor Man" song opens the film
=== 1939 ===
68	Customers Wanted	January 27	Seymour Kneitel; William Henning		
Film produced by Max Fleischer, Isadore Sparber and Sam Buchwald; Fleischer studio publicity director Hamp Howard voices Bluto; Compilation film, scenes from Let's Get Movin' and The Twisker Pitcher; In the public domain in the United States; First appearance of the "Paramount presents" byline
69	Aladdin and His Wonderful Lamp	April 7	David Tendlar; William Sturm; Nicholas Tafuri; Reuben Grossman		
A two-reel Popeye Color Special; In the public domain in the United States
70	Leave Well Enough Alone	April 28	Seymour Kneitel; Abner Matthews		
Film produced by Max Fleischer, Sam Buchwald and Isadore Sparber; Jack Mercer also voices Polly the Parrot; Margie Hines voices Olive Oyl; William Pennell voices Bluto
71	Wotta Nitemare	May 19	Willard Bowsky; George Germanetti		
Film produced by Adolph Zukor Max Fleischer, Sam Buchwald and Isadore Sparber; Jack Mercer voices Bluto
72	Ghosks is the Bunk	June 14	William Henning; Abner Matthews		
Hamp Howard voices Bluto
73	Hello, How Am I	July 14	William Henning; Abner Matthews		
74	It's the Natural Thing to Do	July 30	Tom Johnson; Lod Rossner		
Film produced by Adolph Zukor, Max Fleischer, Sam Buchwald and Isadore Sparber; Jack Mercer voices Bluto; Based on the Bing Crosby song It's the Natural Thing to Do from the 1937 Paramount musical Double or Nothing
75	Never Sock a Baby	November 3	William Henning; Abner Matthews		
Features Swee'Pea (voiced by Margie Hines); Sets by Shane Miller; Return of the "ship-door" opening segment in a new redesigned version; Final on-screen credit for E. C. Segar; Popeye does not eat spinach, as he finds his can empty.
=== 1940 ===
76	Shakespearean Spinach	January 19	Roland Crandall; Ben Solomon	George Manuell	
First Popeye cartoon with story credit, given here to George Manuell; First cartoon with Pinto Colvig as the voice of Bluto
77	Females is Fickle	March 8	David Tendlar; William Sturm	Joseph E. Stultz	
Pinto Colvig voices Jellyfish
78	Stealin Aint Honest	March 22	Thomas Johnson; Frank Endres	George Manuell	
Film produced by Adolph Zukor, Max Fleischer, Isadore Sparber and Sam Buchwald; Margie Hines voices Olive Oyl; Tedd Pierce voices Bluto; Additional voices by William Pennell; Additional animation by Graham Place, Harold Walker, Hal Walker, Jack Ozark, Abner Kneitel and Abner Matthews
79	Me Feelins is Hurt	April 12	Orestes Calpini; Bob Leffingwell	William Turner	
Film produced by Max Fleischer, Sam Buchwald & Isadore Sparber; Margie Hines voices Olive Oyl; Pinto Colvig voices Bluto
80	Onion Pacific	May 24	Willard Bowsky; James Davis	Joseph E. Stultz	
Film produced by Max Fleischer, Sam Buchwald & Isadore Sparber; Margie Hines voices Olive Oyl; Pinto Colvig voices Bluto; Louis Fleischer voices Wimpy; Title is a reference to both the Union Pacific Railroad and the 1939 Paramount feature.; Final appearance of J. Wellington Wimpy in a Fleischer short
81	Wimmin is a Myskery	June 7	Willard Bowsky; Joseph D'Igalo	Ted Pierce	
Film produced by Max Fleischer, Sam Buchwald & Isadore Sparber; First appearance by Pipeye, Pupeye, Poopeye and Peepeye (in a dream sequence); All other voices are provided by Jack Mercer; Margie Hines voices Olive Oyl
82	Nurse-Mates	June 20	Graham Place; Louis Zukor	George Manuell	
Film produced by Max Fleischer, Sam Buchwald and Isadore Sparber; Pinto Colvig voices Bluto; Rare occasion where Popeye does not eat spinach
83	Fightin' Pals	July 12	Willard Bowsky; Robert Bentley	Joseph E. Stultz	
First cartoon in which Popeye and Bluto become friends; Jack Mercer voices Popeye; Last cartoon with Pinto Colvig as the voice of Bluto; Bluto's last appearance until 1942.
84	Doing Impossikible Stunts	August 2	Tom Johnson; Frank Endres	Jack Ward	
Film produced by Max Fleischer, Sam Buchwald and Isadore Sparber; Jack Mercer also voices Movie Director; Margie Hines voices Olive Oyl and Swee'Pea; Additional voices by Pinto Colvig; Compilation film, includes scenes from I Never Changes My Altitude, I Wanna Be a Life Guard, Bridge Ahoy!, and Lost and Foundry
85	Wimmin Hadn't Oughta Drive	August 16	Orestes Calpini; Reuben Grossman	George Manuell	
Film produced by Max Fleischer, Sam Buchwald and Isadore Sparber; Margie Hines voices Olive Oyl
86	Puttin on the Act	August 30	Dave Tendlar; Thomas Golden	William Turner	
Film produced by Adolph Zukor, Max Fleischer, Sam Buchwald & Isadore Sparber; All other voices are provided by Jack Mercer; Margie Hines voices Olive Oyl
87	Popeye Meets William Tell	September 20	James Culhane; Alfred Eugster	Dan Gordon	
Film directed by Dave Fleischer and James "Shamus" Culhane; Film produced by Max Fleischer, Sam Buchwald and Isadore Sparber; All other voices are provided by Jack Mercer; Pinto Colvig voices the High Governor; Additional animation by Nick Tafuri and Bob Wickersham
88	My Pop, My Pop	October 18	Arnold Gillespie; Abner Kneitel	William Turner	
Film produced by Max Fleischer, Sam Buchwald & Isadore Sparber; All voices are provided by Jack Mercer
89	With Poopdeck Pappy	November 15	Bill Nolan; Winfield Hoskins	George Manuell	
Film produced by Adolph Zukor, Max Fleischer, Sam Buchwald & Isadore Sparber; All voices are provided by Jack Mercer
90	Popeye Presents Eugene, the Jeep	December 13	Grim Natwick; Irving Spector	Joseph E. Stultz	
Film produced by Max Fleischer, Sam Buchwald & Isadore Sparber; Pinto Colvig voices Delivery Man; All other voices are provided by Jack Mercer; Final film appearance of Eugene the Jeep; Final Popeye cartoon to feature the voice of Pinto Colvig
=== 1941 ===
91	Problem Pappy	January 10	Myron Waldman; Sidney Pillet	Ted Pierce	
Film produced by Max Fleischer, Isadore Sparber and Sam Buchwald; All voices are provided by Jack Mercer
92	Quiet! Pleeze	February 7	Willard Bowsky; Lod Rossner	Milford Davis	
Except for the Baby crying, all voices are provided by Jack Mercer; The final cartoon that animator Willard Bowsky worked on; Footage re-used from 1934's Sock-a-Bye, Baby
93	Olive's Sweepstake Ticket	March 7	Arnold Gillespie; Abner Kneitel	Joseph E. Stultz and Ted Pierce	
Film produced by Max Fleischer, Sam Buchwald and Isadore Sparber; The famous spinach sequence isn't featured in this cartoon; Margie Hines voices Olive Oyl
94	Flies Ain't Human	April 4	Tom Johnson; George Germanetti	Eric St. Clair	
Film produced by Max Fleischer, Sam Buchwald and Isadore Sparber; First cartoon in which Popeye battles a non-human enemy; Jack Mercer voices Popeye; Margie Hines voices the Flies
95	Popeye Meets Rip Van Winkle	May 9	Myron Waldman; Sidney Pillet	Dan Gordon	
Film produced by Adolph Zukor, Max Fleischer and Sam Buchwald; All voices are provided by Jack Mercer
96	Olive's Boithday Presink	June 13	Dave Tendlar; Thomas Golden	Ted Pierce	
Film produced by Max Fleischer, Sam Buchwald & Isadore Sparber; Cameo appearance by George W. Geezil; Although Olive's name is in the title and she's mentioned, she does not appear in this cartoon.; All voices are provided by Jack Mercer & Margie Hines; Re-worked by Tedd Pierce as "Duck Soup to Nuts"
97	Child Psykolojiky	July 11	Bill Nolan; Joe Oriolo	George Manuell	
Film produced by Max Fleischer, Sam Buchwald & Isadore Sparber; Margie Hines voices Swee'Pea; All other voices are provided by Jack Mercer; Final appearance of the "ship-door" opening segment
98	Pest Pilot	August 8	Dave Tendlar; Tom Baron	George Manuell	
Film produced by Max Fleischer, Sam Buchwald & Isadore Sparber; All voices are provided by Jack Mercer and Margie Hines; Last Fleischer cartoon to feature Poopdeck Pappy; First appearance of the opening segment with Popeye's head and pipe
99	I'll Never Crow Again	September 19	Orestes Calpini; Reuben Grossman	Cal Howard	
Film produced by Max Fleischer, Sam Buchwald & Isadore Sparber; Margie Hines voices Olive Oyl; All other voices by Jack Mercer; Features the song "It's a Hap-Hap-Happy Day" from Gulliver's Travels
100	The Mighty Navy	October 14	Seymour Kneitel; Abner Matthews	William Turner; Ted Pierce	
Film produced by Adolph Zukor, Max Fleischer, Sam Buchwald & Isadore Sparber; All voices are provided by Jack Mercer and Ted Pierce; First World War II-themed cartoon; First appearance of Popeye in white U.S. Navy uniform; 100th Popeye cartoon
101	Nix on Hypnotricks	December 19	Dave Tendlar; John Walworth	Bill Turner; Cal Howard	
Film produced by Max Fleischer, Sam Buchwald & Isadore Sparber; Jack Mercer also voices Professor I. Stare and the Taxi Driver; Margie Hines voices Olive Oyl and Bird; A reworking of the sleepwalking routine in the cartoon "A Dream Walking"
=== 1942 ===
102	Kickin' the Conga 'Round	January 17	Tom Johnson; George Germanetti	Bill Turner; Ted Pierce	
Film produced by Adolph Zukor, Max Fleischer, Isadore Sparber and Sam Buchwald; Olive Oyl is known as Olivia Oyla in this cartoon; Margie Hines voices Olive Oyl; Additional voices by Ted Pierce; First appearance of Bluto in his naval outfit, along with a more pear-shaped design. Baritone singer Lee Royce voices Bluto
103	Blunder Below	February 13	Dave Tendlar; Harold Walker	Bill Turner; Ted Pierce	
Film produced by Max Fleischer Sam Buchwald and Isadore Sparber; Additional voices by Michael Fitzmaurice; Some TV versions are edited for racial stereotyping of Japanese people
104	Fleets of Stren'th	March 13	Al Eugster; Tom Golden	Dan Gordon; Jack Mercer	
Film produced by Max Fleischer Sam Buchwald and Isadore Sparber; Additional voices by Ted Pierce; First story writing credit for Jack Mercer; Popeye goes to war in this cartoon.
105	Pipeye, Pupeye, Poopeye, and Peepeye	April 10	Seymour Kneitel; George Germanetti	Seymour Kneitel	
First canonical appearance of Pipeye, Pupeye, Poopeye and Peepeye; Film produced by Max Fleischer, Sam Buchwald and Isadore Sparber; All voices are provided by Jack Mercer; Final Fleischer cartoon with Popeye in his original comic strip uniform of black shirt and captain's cap
106	Olive Oyl and Water Don't Mix	May 8	Dave Tendlar; Abner Kneitel	Jack Mercer; Jack Ward	
Film produced by Max Fleischer, Sam Buchwald and Isadore Sparber; Margie Hines voices Olive Oyl; Ted Pierce and Jack Mercer voice Bluto; Additional voices by Ted Pierce
107	Many Tanks	June 16	Tom Johnson; Frank Endres	Bill Turner; Carl Meyer	
Film produced by Max Fleischer, Sam Buchwald and Isadore Sparber; Margie Hines voices Olive Oyl; Ted Pierce and Dave Barry voice Bluto; Last Fleischer cartoon to feature Bluto, as well as his pear-shaped design.
108	Baby Wants a Bottleship	July 3	Alfred Eugster; Joseph Oriolo	Jack Ward; Jack Mercer	
Film produced by Max Fleischer and Isadore Sparber; Margie Hines voices Olive Oyl and Swee'Pea; Final Popeye cartoon by Fleischer Studios

== Let's Sing with Popeye ==
Popeye also appeared in a 1934 short titled Let's Sing with Popeye which had recycled footage from the first Popeye cartoon and had no plot other than to allow the audience to sing along with Popeye via a bouncing ball. This film was made for theaters that participated in Paramount's weekly Popeye Fan Club meetings. The short is available as a special feature on Popeye the Sailor: 1933–1938, Volume 1.
