= Blow Me Down! =

1933 film

- Directed by: Dave Fleischer
- Produced by: Max Fleischer; Adolph Zukor
- Starring: Billy Costello (Popeye); Bonnie Poe (Olive Oyl); William Pennell (Bluto)
- Music by: Sammy Timberg; Sammy Lerner
- Animation by: Willard Bowsky; William Sturm
- Color process: Black-and-white
- Production company: Fleischer Studios
- Distributed by: Paramount Pictures
- Release date: October 27, 1933 (U.S.)
- Running time: 6:19
- Country: United States
- Language: English

Blow me Down! is a Popeye theatrical cartoon short by Fleischer Studios. It was released in 1933 and was the third cartoon in the Popeye the Sailor series of theatrical cartoons released by Paramount Pictures. The title also corresponds to one of Popeye's most notable catchphrases.

== Plot ==
Popeye goes to see Olive Oyl, riding on a whale while singing his theme song. In the town, locals give Popeye dirty looks. One local tries to shoot Popeye, but because of Popeye's strength, the bullet hits Popeye on the back of his head, and hits the local who tried to shoot him. The local falls from the roof to the ground. He goes to a store named "Alla Kinda Flowers," where he requests a bouquet for Olive. After a while, a local gives Popeye a toothy while mocking him. To get even, Popeye smacks the local's teeth out, and they crunch together in his mouth.

The scene then cuts to Olive, dancing in a tavern, entertaining everybody. Popeye walks in using the swinging old-style doors. Olive notices Popeye, patiently sitting at a table. Olive dances to Popeye. Popeye gives Olive her "bouquet" (which consists of only one flower) and Olive dances away with a leap. Olive's feet gets stuck into two spittoons. While Olive struggles to get out of the spittoons, Popeye is laughing. Olive, determined to get even, performs a fancy dance. Afterwards, the people in the tavern applaud to Olive's act.

Bluto enters the tavern. He blasts his guns numerous times, forming a cloud. When the cloud clears, everyone is seen to have fled the tavern—all but Popeye. Bluto, noticing Popeye sitting calmly, goes over to him. A poster reading "$5000 REWARD ... BLUTO THE BANDIT" has Bluto's picture on it. The two Blutos notice each other. Popeye looks at the poster after Bluto, realizing Bluto is the bandit on the poster.

Bluto shows off by popping a bottle of whiskey then drinking some of it. Popeye decides to show off, too, by punching the table, sending the whiskey and a cup into the air. The whiskey bottle tips, pouring itself into the cup, then landing on the table. Popeye drinks the cup of whiskey. Bluto then draws a pistol and shoots it at a candle. Upon landing, the pieces of candle form into smaller candles. Challenging Bluto, Popeye eats the pistol. Then, using his mouth as a barrel, he shoots a deck and its columns, collapsing the deck to the floor. Bluto socks Popeye in the face, twisting his neck like a whirlybird. Popeye then punches Bluto, sending him into a wall. Bluto opens a door next to him, and his fellow bandits rush in.

Popeye beats the other bandits to the rhythm of music. He sends one bandit crashing into a mirror, one leaning on a handle of a deck, another onto an antler of an animal trophy, another onto a railing, one onto a supporting roof column, one crashing through a window, and the last on another animal trophy. The trophy bites the bandit on the rear end, while the bandit screams in pain. Popeye continues beating bandits. Bluto works his way to Olive's dressing room. Olive, thinking Popeye is at the door, allows Bluto in. Bluto creates chaos while Olive screams for Popeye to help her.

Popeye barges into Olive's dressing room, where he sees Olive beating Bluto with a club. Then Bluto sees Popeye and, out of anger, socks Popeye away, afterwards Olive hitting Bluto with the club. The process repeats until Bluto gets tired. Popeye, finding his chance, socks Bluto, thus sending him out of the window. Popeye finds Bluto lying on Olive's balcony. When Popeye goes to sock him, Bluto knocks Popeye to a different balcony. Popeye jumps back, and knocks Bluto's head several times. Then they both fall to the ground. They keep fighting until Bluto gets tired. Popeye gathers all his muscle and knocks Bluto so hard, it sends him into an orbit around the Earth. When Bluto lands, he falls on his back. At the end of the cartoon, Popeye stands on his belly with one foot, yelling “I’m Popeye the Sailor Man!”. Before the cartoon ends.

== Notes ==
Blow Me Down! is the third cartoon in the Popeye the Sailor (Fleischer) series. It is available on DVD in the four-disc set Popeye the Sailor: 1933–1938, Volume 1. A colorized version also exists.

== Reception ==
The short was noted as " provid(ing) an example of a high-angle shot of Popeye leaping up a saloon stairway, as well as an example of simulated camera movement."
