= Let's You and Him Fight =

- Directed by: Dave Fleischer
- Produced by: Max Fleischer; Adolph Zukor
- Starring: Billy Costello; Bonnie Poe; Charles Lawrence; William Pennell
- Music by: Sammy Timberg; Sammy Lerner
- Animation by: Willard Bowsky; William Sturm
- Color process: Black-and-white
- Production company: Fleischer Studios
- Distributed by: Paramount Pictures
- Release date: February 16, 1934 (U.S.)
- Running time: 6:05
- Country: United States
- Language: English

Let's You and Him Fight is a Popeye theatrical cartoon short released in February 16, 1934, starring Billy Costello as Popeye, Bonnie Poe as Olive Oyl, William Pennell as Bluto and Charles Lawrence as the announcer.

== Plot ==
The cartoon begins with Popeye and Bluto outside training for a championship boxing match. Bluto shows his strength by viciously beating a boxing dummy and punching a 1,000-pound weight until it falls apart and reassembles as a small car that drives away. Popeye sings his theme song as he skips rope, and shows his strength by punching the backside of a mule until the mule kicks Popeye in the chin, only for the mule's horseshoes to break.

That evening, crowds fill in to Yank'em Stadium for the fight. In Popeye's dressing room, Olive pleads with Popeye not to fight Bluto. When Popeye does not respond, Olive leaves and tells Popeye that she will never see him again. Both Popeye and Bluto enter the ring, and the boxing match begins when the time clock punches Wimpy the timekeeper and Wimpy's head hits the bell. Popeye gets pounded mercilessly as Olive listens to the fight on a radio at her home. After crying into a pot on her stove, Olive grabs a can of spinach and runs to the stadium. Olive reaches Popeye and tells him, "Fight, ya palooka, fight!" Popeye eats the spinach and begins to beat up Bluto. Popeye pounds Bluto in the head, as Popeye's hands turn into hammers and Bluto's head turns into an anvil set to the tune of the "Anvil Chorus". Popeye continues his assault until he hits Bluto so hard that he flies out of the ring and breaks through numerous wood pillars before hitting a wall and flying back into the ring. Bluto lands on Popeye and the referee declares Bluto the winner. Popeye responds "Oh, yeah?" and punches Bluto in the stomach and hits the referee, knocking both men out.

== Production notes ==
Let's You and Him Fight is the first Popeye entry to feature "The Stars and Stripes Forever" march during a spinach fight.

== Home media ==
Let's You and Him Fight is available on DVD in the four-disc set Popeye the Sailor: 1933–1938, Volume 1.
