= Hollywood on Parade =

1932 film

- Directed by: Louis Lewyn
- Starring: See below
- Distributed by: Paramount Pictures
- Release dates: 1932 (U.S.); 1933 (U.S.); 1934 (U.S.)
- Running time: 10 minutes
- Country: United States
- Language: English

Hollywood on Parade is a series of short subject films, produced by Louis Lewyn and released by Paramount Pictures between 1932 and 1934. Each of the 10-minute shorts has a different host, who introduces the various segments and personalities. Popular movie stars are seen speaking or singing in supposedly informal settings, although the action was always staged for the cameras. Other segments are genuinely informal newsreel-type scenes, shot silent, with stars seen playing golf, attending sporting events, or visiting local functions.

== Background ==
Producer Louis Lewyn had brought the "stars at play" idea to the talking screen in 1929, with The Voice of Hollywood for independent Tiffany Pictures. Lewyn used the same premise—random scenes of film players, tied together with a different host for each reel. The theme was always a fictitious radio station with the call letters STAR, and the host would "broadcast" a program of film favorites. Moviegoers were invited to send requests for stars they would like to see.

Mary Pickford and Conrad Nagel, working on behalf of the Motion Picture Relief Association, devised a series of all-star shorts to benefit actors and crew members who were now indigent or inactive. Pickford asked Louis Lewyn to produce the shorts, and Nagel placed them with Paramount for release. The stars volunteered their time and services for Hollywood on Parade, with Lewyn turning 90 percent of the profits to the relief fund. Paramount released 13 Hollywood on Parade reels during the first year, and another 12 the next. Harry Cohn of Columbia Pictures protested that Pickford's Hollywood on Parade arrangement was "unfair discrimination against Columbia's Screen Snapshots series." Cohn's series had been going since 1920, and he was opposed to the competition. (As it happened, Hollywood on Parade lapsed in 1934 while Screen Snapshots ran through 1958, so Cohn was the ultimate winner.)

Louis Lewyn went on to produce a series of all-star cameos for Metro-Goldwyn-Mayer, now 20 minutes in length and photographed in Technicolor.

== Production notes ==
The Hollywood on Parade theme song was composed by bandleader Hal Grayson and tunesmith Malcolm Beelby, with special lyrics by silent-screen star Clara Bow. The shorts announce Bow's contribution at least twice on screen, and columnist Louella Parsons confirmed Bow's participation in the charity effort: "No one need laugh at Clara Bow's ambition to write verse. Must be good, for Clara has written the lyrics for Hollywood on Parade."

The Hollywood on Parade films were later acquired by producer Phil Goldstone, whose Criterion Pictures re-released them to theaters. These early-1930s reels were now quite dated, with mostly bygone stars. Goldstone modernized them by presenting them as nostalgic novelties, inviting the viewer "down memory lane" to remember the old favorites in the films.

== Obscure appearances ==
Many obscure appearances by famous stars can be found in Hollywood on Parade. The young Ginger Rogers makes an appearance in the very first short, doing an impromptu song-and-dance with comedian Jack Oakie. Silent-screen ingenue Billie Dove makes a rare talking appearance in the third entry. Jeanette MacDonald and Maurice Chevalier each have song numbers in the fifth subject. Bela Lugosi appears in full Dracula regalia in one short, in which a wax-museum figure of the vampire comes to life in the person of Lugosi. The cartoon star Betty Boop appears in two separate entries, both in live action: Helen Kane plays Betty in one, and cartoon voice performer Bonnie Poe impersonates Betty in the other, opposite Lugosi. The Three Stooges appear in a 1934 reel, noteworthy as the first appearance of Curly Howard on film. Another 1934 release shows 12 of the WAMPAS Baby Stars, starlets chosen by California movie merchants as good bets for stardom, including Ginger Rogers, Gloria Stuart, Mary Carlisle, and Patricia Ellis.

== List of shorts ==
Note: Although the individual films had nominal release dates, the entire series was offered in groups so theaters could take their pick from those in current release. A reel listed as a "March 1933" release, for example, actually played first-run in New York theaters two months before.

- Hollywood on Parade # A-1 (1932) Host: Fredric March. With Ginger Rogers, Mitzi Green, Jack Oakie, Jack Duffy, The Brox Sisters, Eddie Peabody.
- Hollywood on Parade # A-2 (1932) Host: Stuart Erwin. With Bing Crosby, Burns and Allen, Olsen and Johnson, The Mills Brothers.
- Hollywood on Parade # A-3 (1932) Host: Eddie Kane. With Roscoe Ates, Dorothy Ates, Wheeler and Woolsey, Bob Bromley's Puppets, Helen Kane as Betty Boop, Jackie Cooper, Anna May Wong, Douglas Fairbanks, Jr., Billie Dove, Jimmy Durante, Frankie Darro, Ben Lyon, Bebe Daniels, Tom Mix.
- Hollywood on Parade # A-4 (1932) Host: Benny Rubin. With Tom Mix, Gary Cooper, Fifi D'Orsay, Baby Peggy.
- Hollywood on Parade # A-5 (1932) Host: Mickey Daniels. With Roland Young, Ken Maynard, Jeanette MacDonald, Maurice Chevalier.
- Hollywood on Parade # A-6 (1933) Host: Richard Arlen. With Heinie Conklin, Frances Dee, Clark Gable, Tallulah Bankhead, Buster Keaton, Lew Cody.
- Hollywood on Parade # A-7 (1933) Host: Frankie Darro. With Mary Pickford, Douglas Fairbanks, Maurice Chevalier, Jackie Coogan, Mary Pickford, Amelia Earhart, James Gleason.
- Hollywood on Parade # A-8 (1933) Host: Eddie Borden. With Rex Bell, Bonnie Poe as Betty Boop, Bela Lugosi, Dorothy Burgess, George Sidney and Charlie Murray, and Gayne Whitman.
- Hollywood on Parade # A-9 (1933) Host: Skeets Gallagher. With Eddie Lambert and His Band, Fifi D'Orsay, Ivan Lebedeff.
- Hollywood on Parade # A-10 (1933)
- Hollywood on Parade # A-11 (1933)
- Hollywood on Parade # A-12 (1933) Host: Cliff Edwards. With Clarence Muse, Warren William, Jean Harlow, Alice White, William Powell, Carole Lombard, Wheeler and Woolsey, Claudia Dell, Raquel Torres, Polly Moran, Lupe Vélez.
- Hollywood on Parade # A-13 (1933)
- Hollywood on Parade # B-1 (1933)
- Hollywood on Parade # B-2 (1933)
- Hollywood on Parade # B-3 (1933)
- Hollywood on Parade # B-4 (1933)
- Hollywood on Parade # B-5 (1933)
- Hollywood on Parade # B-6 (1934)
- Hollywood on Parade # B-7 (1934) Host: Willy Pogany (artist). With Johnny Mack Brown, Harry Green, Bebe Daniels, Mary Pickford, Buster Collier, John Boles, Robert Woolsey, The WAMPAS Baby Stars: Ruth Hall, Patricia Ellis, Lilian Bond, Boots Mallory, Evalyn Knapp, Dorothy Layton, Dorothy Wilson, Mary Carlisle, Marian Shockley, Toshia Mora, Gloria Stuart, Eleanor Holm, Ginger Rogers, Lona Andre.
- Hollywood on Parade # B-8 (1934)
- Hollywood on Parade # B-9 (1934) With Ted Healy and His Three Stooges (Curly Howard, Larry Fine, Moe Howard), Bonnie Bonnell.
- Hollywood on Parade # B-10 (1934)
- Hollywood on Parade # B-11 (1934)
- Hollywood on Parade # B-12 (1934)

== Cast ==
- Ben Alexander
- Gracie Allen
- Adrienne Ames
- Richard Arlen
- Roscoe Ates
- Baby Peggy
- Max Baer
- George Bancroft
- Tallulah Bankhead
- Richard Barthelmess
- Warner Baxter
- Rex Bell
- Constance Bennett
- Joan Bennett
- Sally Blane
- Joan Blondell
- Mary Boland
- Bonnie Bonnell
- Eddie Borden
- El Brendel
- George Brent
- Clive Brook
- Joe E. Brown
- Brox Sisters
- George Burns
- Bruce Cabot
- Leo Carrillo
- Charlie Chaplin
- Ruth Chatterton
- Virginia Cherrill
- Maurice Chevalier
- Lew Cody
- Claudette Colbert
- William Collier Jr.
- Ronald Colman
- Russ Columbo
- Gary Cooper
- Jackie Cooper
- Buster Crabbe
- Richard Cromwell
- Bing Crosby
- Constance Cummings
- Viola Dana
- Bebe Daniels
- Mickey Daniels
- Frankie Darro
- Frances Dee
- Claudia Dell
- Cecil B. DeMille
- Jack Dempsey
- Florence Desmond
- Marlene Dietrich
- Richard Dix
- Fifi D'Orsay
- Billie Dove
- Louise Dresser
- Jimmy Durante
- Cliff Edwards
- Stuart Erwin
- Ruth Etting
- Douglas Fairbanks Jr.
- Larry Fine
- Norman Foster
- Clark Gable
- Richard Gallagher
- Paulette Goddard
- Mack Gordon
- Jetta Goudal
- Cary Grant
- Sid Grauman
- Mitzi Green
- Lloyd Hamilton
- Jean Harlow
- Raymond Hatton
- Ted Healy
- Jack Holt
- Miriam Hopkins
- Edward Everett Horton
- Moe Howard
- Curly Howard
- Walter Huston
- Chic Johnson
- Arline Judge
- Eddie Kane
- Helen Kane
- Buster Keaton
- Alvin "Shipwreck" Kelly
- Harry Langdon
- Charles Laughton
- Harold Lloyd
- Carole Lombard
- Bessie Love
- Edmund Lowe
- Béla Lugosi
- Ben Lyon
- Jeanette MacDonald
- Fredric March
- Ken Maynard
- The Marx Brothers
- Tim McCoy
- Adolphe Menjou
- Tom Mix
- Robert Montgomery
- Polly Moran
- Clarence Muse
- Jack Oakie
- Ole Olsen
- Eddie Peabody
- Mary Pickford
- Bonnie Poe
- William Powell
- Marie Prevost
- George Raft
- Gene Raymond
- Harry Revel
- Ginger Rogers
- Benny Rubin
- Chic Sale
- Ann Sheridan

- Alison Skipworth
- Anita Stewart
- Gloria Swanson
- Lilyan Tashman
- Estelle Taylor
- Jimmy Thomson
- Thelma Todd
- Raquel Torres
- Ben Turpin
- Rudy Vallée
- Lupe Velez
- Johnny Weissmuller
- Mae West
- Bert Wheeler
- Alice White
- Warren William
- Dorothy Wilson
- Lois Wilson
- Anna May Wong
- Robert Woolsey
- Fay Wray
- Ed Wynn
- Roland Young
