= Seasin's Greetinks! =

- Directed by: Dave Fleischer
- Produced by: Max Fleischer
- Starring: Billy Costello; Bonnie Poe; William Pennell
- Animation by: Seymour Kneitel; Roland Crandall
- Color process: Black-and-white
- Production company: Fleischer Studios
- Distributed by: Paramount Pictures
- Release date: December 17, 1933 (U.S.)
- Running time: 5:55
- Country: United States
- Language: English

Seasin's Greetinks! is a Popeye theatrical Christmas-themed cartoon short, starring Billy Costello as Popeye and Bonnie Poe as Olive Oyl and William Pennell as Bluto. It was released on December 17, 1933 and is in the Popeye the Sailor series of theatrical cartoons released by Paramount Pictures.

Seasin's Greetinks! is the fourth Popeye cartoon, and it is also part of one of the few Popeye Christmas and New Year cartoons produced by Paramount Pictures for King Features Entertainment. Others include Let's Celebrake (1938 theatrical short, produced by Fleischer Studios), Mister and Mistletoe (1955 theatrical short) and Spinach Greetings (1961 Popeye episode), both produced by Paramount Cartoon Studios.

== Plot ==
Popeye gives Olive a pair of ice skates as a Christmas present and teaches her how to skate, but Bluto interrupts the lesson to show how his affection to her, but she gives him the cold shoulder. He starts to cut the ice and she floats on the broken pieces on the running river and calls Popeye for help. As Bluto keeps punching Popeye to keep him from saving her, Olive sees a waterfall and calls for help again. Popeye punches Bluto in and out of the water in an ice cube and sends him to the ice box in the nearest town. He rushes to save Olive, but soon falls down the waterfall and climbs back to save her. As he revives her, Bluto rolls a big snowball to destroy them, but his plan backfires and he rolls down the hill with it. Popeye uses his spinach, hits the snow out of Bluto to make it fall, hits him again, and stars appear out of him which decorate a Christmas tree. Popeye says "Season's Greetings to you all!" and the cartoon irises out.

== See also ==
- List of Christmas films
