= Betty Boop's Bamboo Isle =

1932 American animated short film

- Directed by: Dave Fleischer; Shamus Culhane (uncredited)
- Produced by: Max Fleischer (producer)
- Starring: The Royal Samoans & Miri; Margie Hines
- Music by: The Royal Samoans
- Animation by: Shamus Culhane (uncredited); Seymour Kneitel; Bernard Wolf
- Color process: Black-and-white
- Production company: Fleischer Studios
- Distributed by: Paramount Pictures
- Release date: September 23, 1932
- Running time: 8 minutes
- Country: United States
- Language: English

Betty Boop's Bamboo Isle is a 1932 Fleischer Studios Betty Boop animated short, directed by Dave Fleischer.

== Plot ==
The cartoon opens with Bimbo as a sailor playing a ukulele and riding in a motorboat. His motorboat goes faster and faster, until it crashes into a tropical island shore located in Hawaii. Bimbo is thrown from the wreckage and lands in another boat owned by Betty Boop, portrayed as a dark-skinned, topless (except for a strategically placed lei) island princess.

Bimbo introduces himself and sings to Betty before they go over a waterfall, and are flung from the boat into a clearing surrounded by spirited tree that sing an eerie song. A group native warriors approach, so Bimbo disguises himself by painting his face black with dirt and sticking a bone in his hair. The natives are ready to attack Bimbo at first, but treat him as an honored guest after hearing him sing. Bimbo is entertained by Betty who does a hula dance, after which a sudden rainstorm washes off his disguise. The natives immediately turn on Bimbo, and he and Betty are chased from the village. They run until they reach Bimbo's motorboat to make a narrow escape. When it seems that they are alone, the two proceed to kiss in private behind an umbrella, with a convenient hole.

== Production ==
Betty's hula dance was a visual high point of this episode and appears to be closely modeled on the hula dancer that appeared in the opening live action sequence (though the dancer was not "topless" as Betty is). This is one of the more apparent examples of the rotoscope technique which the Fleisher Studio used for realistic animation. The hula sequence was later reused for Betty's cameo in 1933's Popeye the Sailor and in 1934's Betty Boop's Rise to Fame.
