= Wild Elephinks =

- Directed by: Dave Fleischer
- Produced by: Max Fleischer
- Starring: Billy Costello; Bonnie Poe; William Pennell
- Animation by: Willard Bowsky; William Sturm
- Color process: Black-and-white
- Production company: Fleischer Studios
- Distributed by: Paramount Pictures
- Release date: December 29, 1933 (U.S.)
- Running time: 6:05
- Country: United States
- Language: English

Wild Elephinks is a Popeye theatrical cartoon short, starring Billy Costello as Popeye, Bonnie Poe as Olive Oyl, William Pennell as a Lion. It was released in 1933 and was the fifth entry in the Popeye the Sailor series of theatrical cartoons released by Paramount Pictures, lasting through 1957.

== Plot ==
Popeye and Olive Oyl land in the jungle with many Wild Animals. Popeye and Olive must fight off various animals including a Lion who walks up and announces that he's the Island King, an Elephant and a Gorilla.

== Home video ==
This cartoon is available on DVD in the four-disc set Popeye the Sailor: 1933–1938, Volume 1.
