= I Yam What I Yam =

1933 film

- Directed by: Dave Fleischer
- Produced by: Max Fleischer; Adolph Zukor
- Starring: Billy Costello; Bonnie Poe; Charles Lawrence
- Music by: Sammy Timberg; Sammy Lerner
- Animation by: Seymour Kneitel; William Henning; Roland Crandall
- Color process: Black-and-white
- Production company: Fleischer Studios
- Distributed by: Paramount Publix Corporation
- Release date: September 29, 1933 (U.S.)
- Running time: 6:04
- Country: United States
- Language: English

I Yam What I Yam is the second Popeye theatrical cartoon short, starring Billy Costello as Popeye, Bonnie Poe as Olive Oyl and Charles Lawrence as Wimpy. The source of the quote is the comic strip, Thimble Theatre by E. C. Segar, in which Popeye first appeared. This is a paraphrase of words spoken by Popeye in the comic strip.

== Plot ==
The cartoon opens with Popeye, Olive Oyl and Wimpy riding on a small rowboat through a heavy rainstorm in the ocean. Popeye is standing up against the torrent of rain singing his theme song, while Olive is rowing the boat and Wimpy is sitting in the back, plucking fish out of the water and eating them whole. Popeye gets struck by lightning several times, grabs the last thunderbolt, and punches it into the water, where it sinks and screams for help. The nearby thunderclouds are frightened by this action and flee, changing the weather to a sunny, clear sky. The boat abruptly sprouts a few holes and sinks, and the trio land on a nearby island inhabited by unfriendly Native Americans. Popeye punches an outcropping of nearby trees to instantaneously build a log cabin, complete with indoor furniture, windows and a stone chimney with fire. Olive heads indoors, and Wimpy tells Popeye to fetch ducks for dinner before resting inside.

While out, Popeye is intimidated by a tribal member who repeatedly tells him "Hello." before punching Popeye, provoking Popeye into punching back at the tribal member. Another tribal member sneaks up from behind and whacks him with a club, shattering it to pieces and only annoying Popeye, who gives the Indian a "twister punch." At the duck pond, Popeye finds more Native Americans shooting arrows at the ducks, missing them repeatedly. Popeye bends the remaining three arrows, goes toward the pond, and goes into it while the ducks go under the water. When Popeye walks out, he is seen with the ducks, quacking. To get the ducks, the Native Americans grab the arrows, which are bent, and shoot them. However, the arrows act like boomerangs and hit the tribal members instead.

Meanwhile, back at the cabin, Native Americans are closing in on the cabin. Olive Oyl blocks them by stretching her legs over the doors, while the tribal members try to invade. Olive screams for help. When the Native Americans try to come out of the floorboards, Wimpy is sitting on a chair on the floorboards. The resulting gag depicts when the Native Americans stretch, Wimpy pours more food into his bowl. When the tribal members finally make it in, Wimpy is thrown out. To get even, Wimpy pulls back a cactus, releasing its thorns. However, Wimpy is met with arrows striking the cactus. Wimpy screams in fear, and runs to Popeye for help. While Popeye walks back to the log cabin, the ducks are seen following Popeye, attracted to the smoke from Popeye's corncob pipe. Wimpy tells Popeye the situation, and after seeing the ducks, he pulls out a fork and knife, sighing in pleasure. When the ducks see the fork and knife, they flee, with Wimpy chasing them from behind. Meanwhile, Olive Oyl is successfully fighting off dozens of the Native Americans piling into the cabin, still screaming for Popeye's help. Popeye arrives at the cabin, dodging a barrage of arrows and fighting off dozens of Native Americans, even grabbing an entire group of them and delivering a punch that transforms them into a pile of Native American nickels. With the bulk of the Native Americans defeated, one last batch of them is left to deal with, who shoot Popeye full of arrows, which he is completely unharmed by. Popeye promptly pulls out a can of spinach, eating both the vegetable and the can itself. He punches the row of the remaining Native Americans, causing a domino effect. The final gag shows Popeye punching out the giant tribal chief, causing him to lose his outfit and becomes an Indian, Mahatma Gandhi. The cartoon ends with Popeye singing "I'm Popeye the Sailor Man!".

== Production notes ==
I Yam What I Yam is the second Popeye cartoon and the first cartoon in Popeye's own series; the first entry, Popeye the Sailor, was released as a Betty Boop cartoon.

This cartoon is available on DVD in the four-disc set Popeye the Sailor: 1933–1938, Volume 1.

== See also ==
- I Am that I Am
