= Ghosks Is the Bunk =

Ghosks is in the Bunk
- Directed by: Dave Fleischer; Animation: William Henning (uncredited)
- Produced by: Max Fleischer; Isadore Sparber; Sam Buchwald
- Starring: Jack Mercer; Margie Hines; Hamp Howard
- Edited by: Kitty Pfister
- Music by: Sammy Timberg
- Animation by: William Henning; Abner Matthews
- Layouts by: Anton Loeb
- Backgrounds by: Anton Loeb
- Color process: Black and white
- Production company: Fleischer Studios
- Distributed by: Paramount Pictures
- Release date: June 14, 1939
- Running time: 6:36
- Country: United States
- Language: English

Ghosks Is the Bunk is a 1939 animated short starring Popeye, Olive Oyl and Bluto. Olive reads a ghost story to Popeye and Bluto. Bluto leaves and rigs a haunted house and lures them to it. But they quickly discover him and, even better, a can of invisible paint, and they get the better of him.

== Voice cast ==
- Jack Mercer as Popeye
- Margie Hines as Olive Oyl
- Hamp Howard as Bluto
- Additional voices by William Pennell

== Title ==
Ghosks Is the Bunk is the original title, but was mistakenly changed to "Ghosk Is the Bunk" when re-colored years later. This mistake came from tracing over the original title card.

== Releases ==
The black-and-white version of this short is available on DVD on Popeye the Sailor: 1938-1940, Volume 2.

The re-colored version of the short was shown on TBS from 1987 to 1992 as a segment of the Tom & Jerry Halloween Special.
