= The Paneless Window Washer =

- Directed by: Dave Fleischer; Willard Bowsky (animation director)
- Produced by: Max Fleischer; Adolph Zukor
- Starring: Jack Mercer; Mae Questel; Gus Wickie
- Music by: Sammy Timberg
- Production company: Fleischer Studios
- Distributed by: Paramount Pictures
- Release date: January 22, 1937
- Running time: 6 minutes
- Country: United States
- Language: English

The Paneless Window Washer is a 1937 Popeye theatrical cartoon short in the Max Fleischer Cartoon series directed by Dave Fleischer.

== Plot ==
Bluto is trying to make a buck by spraying mud on the windows to make people think they're dirty. Up 20 stories (or at least Popeye says that) is Olive Oyl, public stenographer. Wiping all kinds of windows, Popeye and Bluto get into a bitter quarrel between who's better at cleaning windows.

== Cast ==
- Jack Mercer as Popeye
- Mae Questel as Olive Oyl
- Gus Wickie as Bluto

== Reception ==
The scene with "Olive Oyl's typing is a fun example of exaggeration in The Paneless Window Washer by Fleischer Studios."
