= Boilesk =

1933 film

- Directed by: Dave Fleischer
- Produced by: Max Fleischer
- Starring: Bonnie Poe; Jack Mercer; The Watson Sisters; Billy Costello
- Animation by: Myron Waldman; Willard Bowsky
- Production company: Fleischer Studios
- Distributed by: Paramount Publix Corporation
- Release date: June 9, 1933
- Running time: 11 minutes
- Country: United States
- Language: English

Boilesk is a 1933 Fleischer Studios Screen Songs animated short film starring the "Watson Sisters".

== Synopsis ==
Risque goings-on during an afternoon at a broken-down Burlesque variety show. The show also includes a live-action comedy which features the Watson Sisters who perform 'I'm Playing With Fire' followed with the Bouncing Ball.
