= On with the New =

- Directed by: Dave Fleischer
- Produced by: Max Fleischer
- Starring: Margie Hines; Mae Questel; Jack Mercer
- Animation by: Thomas Johnson; Frank Endres
- Color process: Black-and-white
- Production company: Fleischer Studios
- Distributed by: Paramount Pictures
- Release date: December 2, 1938
- Running time: 7 minutes
- Language: English

On with the New is a 1938 Fleischer Studios animated short film starring Margie Hines as the voice of Betty Boop.

== Synopsis ==
Betty is an overworked cook and dishwasher at a local eatery. She quits her job to run an automated childcare center. However, she finds the job even harder than her previous job when the babies in her care start acting rowdy, so she returns to her old job.
