= My Friend the Monkey =

- Directed by: Dave Fleischer
- Produced by: Max Fleischer
- Starring: Margie Hines
- Music by: Sammy Timberg (uncredited)
- Animation by: Thomas Johnson; Frank Endres; Lod Rossner (uncr.); Otto Feuer (uncr.); Harold Walker (uncr.)
- Color process: Black-and-white
- Distributed by: Paramount Pictures
- Release date: January 27, 1939
- Running time: 7 minutes
- Country: United States
- Language: English

My Friend the Monkey is a 1939 Fleischer Studios animated short film starring Betty Boop.

== Synopsis ==
A hurdy-gurdy man comes by Betty Boop's house. She wants to buy his cute baby monkey. While Betty is outside haggling over the price, the monkey is inside causing plenty of trouble for Pudgy the Pup.
