= Parade of the Wooden Soldiers (film) =

- Directed by: Dave Fleischer; William Henning (animation)
- Produced by: Max Fleischer
- Starring: Bonnie Poe (Betty Boop - voice); David Rubinoff Orchestra (themselves)
- Music by: David Rubinoff and his Orchestra
- Animation by: William Henning; Seymour Kneitel
- Color process: Black and white
- Production company: Fleischer Studios
- Distributed by: Paramount Pictures
- Release date: December 2, 1933
- Running time: 8 minutes
- Country: United States
- Language: English

Parade of the Wooden Soldiers is a 1933 Fleischer Studios live-action and animated short film starring Betty Boop.

The instrumental title theme, "Parade of the Wooden Soldiers" (also known as "Parade of the Tin Soldiers"), was composed by Leon Jessel.

== Plot ==
A large factory complex struggles to produce a single package, which is rushed to a toy store. The box opens, and out steps a Betty Boop doll. The other toys come to life, parade around to the music of Parade of the Wooden Soldiers and crown her their queen. But a large stuffed toy of King Kong begins breaking things up by kidnapping Betty. Eventually, the big ape is defeated, and the (somewhat damaged) toys resume their parade, and afterwards fall still on a counter in a store selling damaged toys.
