= The Rampant Age =

1930 film directed by Phil Rosen

- Directed by: Phil Rosen
- Screenplay by: Harry O. Hoyt
- Story by: Robert S. Carr
- Produced by: Trem Carr
- Starring: James Murray; Merna Kennedy; Eddie Borden
- Cinematography: Herbert Kirkpatrick
- Edited by: William Hamilton
- Production company: Trem Carr Productions
- Distributed by: Continental Talking Pictures
- Release date: January 15, 1930 (US)
- Running time: 61 minutes
- Country: United States
- Language: English

The Rampant Age is a 1930 American pre-Code melodrama film, directed by Phil Rosen. It stars James Murray, Merna Kennedy, and Eddie Borden, and was released on January 15, 1930.

== Cast ==
- James Murray as Sandy Benton
- Merna Kennedy as Doris Lawrence
- Eddie Borden as Eddie Mason
- Margaret Quimby as Estelle
- Florence Turner as Mrs. Lawrence
- Patrick Cunning as De Witt
- Gertrude Messinger as Julie
- John Elliott as Mr. Benton
- John T. Prince as Party Guest
