= Margie Hines =

American actress (1909–1985)

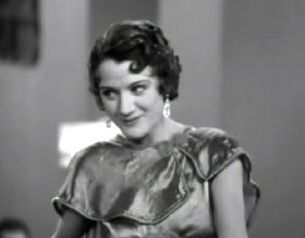
- Hines in 1933 Vitaphone short, Harry Warren: America's Foremost Composer
- Born: Margaret Louise Hines; October 15, 1909; Glendale, New York, U.S.
- Died: December 23, 1985 (aged 76); Seaford, New York, U.S.
- Other names: Marjorie Hines; Marjorie Heidtmann
- Occupation: Voice actress
- Years active: 1930–1943
- Known for: Betty Boop, Olive Oyl
- Spouses: Jack Mercer (m. 1939; div. 1950) Raymond Brenneis (m. 1951; div. 1954) Jesse William Heidtmann (m. 1956)

Margaret Louise Hines (October 15, 1909 – December 23, 1985), (Note: Some sources suggest she was aged 21, or alternatively 24, when she married in 1939. However, the New York Birth Index shows Margaret L Hines as born in Queens, New York on October 15, 1909. The 1910 US Federal Census has Margaret L Hines aged 6 months, living with parents Andrew T and Cecilia M Hines at 7 Van Horn St, Queens. The 1915 New York Census has her, aged 5, with the same parents at 7 Delta Place, Queens. The 1920 Federal Census has Margaret Hines, aged 10, living with Cecile Hines, still at 7 Delta Place. The 1930 Federal Census has Margaret L. Hines aged 20, "singer", living with Cecilia M Hines at 6164 Ralph Ave., Queens. The 1940 Federal Census has Marjorie R (?) Mercer aged 30, "artist", born in Queens, living with Winfield B Mercer, at 3130 Gifford Lane, Miami, Florida. All these records are public records which can be accessed via websites such as Ancestry.com.) also known as Marjorie Hines or Margie Hines, was an American voice actress.

She was known for her work at Fleischer Studios, where she was the original voice of Betty Boop. Hines served from 1930 until 1932 and again from 1938 until 1939, before voicing Olive Oyl and Swee' Pea in the Popeye the Sailor cartoons from 1938 to 1944. She also provided voices for Fleischer's animated films Gulliver's Travels and Mr. Bug Goes to Town.

== Career ==
Hines was the original voice actress for Fleischer's cartoon character Betty Boop, whilst she was touring vaudeville she was heard by vocalist Billy Murray, an employee at Fleischer studio who suggested she was the right choice for the voice of the character who debuted in the cartoon short Dizzy Dishes in 1930. Studio head Max Fleischer hired Hines, as she was a Helen Kane sound-alike, and Kane was the basis for the character. Hines and several other actresses voiced Betty until Mae Questel took over the role in 1931.

Beginning in 1932, Hines also did vocals for Aesop's Film Fables and Tom and Jerry produced by Van Beuren Studios. Her Van Beuren credits were erroneously attributed to Bonnie Poe, another actress who had worked for Fleischer on Betty Boop cartoons.

Mae Questel, who was Fleischer's voice for Betty Boop and Popeye characters Olive Oyl and Swee'Pea during the mid-1930s, left show business in 1938 to start a family. It was that year when Margie Hines was recalled as Questel's replacement. She moved with the Fleischer Studios staff when they left New York City for Miami. As a result, Hines assumed the roles done by Questel in both the Betty Boop and Popeye series. Hines voiced Betty Boop through her final series entries in 1939, and continued to voice Olive until 1943, when the studio, by then taken over by Paramount Pictures and renamed Famous Studios, returned to New York. The Marry-Go-Round (1943) was Hines' final short as the voice of Olive, with Mae Questel returning to the role in 1944 in The Anvil Chorus Girl.

== Personal life ==
Hines was born in Glendale, Queens, New York City, on October 15th, 1909, as Margaret Louise Hines.

On March 3, 1939, Hines married her co-star Winfield B. "Jack" Mercer, who provided the voice of Popeye. At the time of her marriage, her mother lived on Long Island and had the two remarry at a New York church. The two later divorced in 1950. Hines married for a second time in 1951, to Raymond Brenneis (1922–1981), in Greenwich, Connecticut. However, the couple divorced in 1954. In 1956, Hines married Jesse William Heidtmann (1918–1997) in Southold, New York.

Under the name Marjorie L. Heidtmann, Hines died on December 23, 1985 in Seaford, New York, at age 76.

== Filmography ==
Year	Title	Role
1930	Dizzy Dishes	Betty Boop
1932	The Wild Goose Chase	Girl Cat
1932	Pencil Mania	Tomtato / Flapper
1933	Magic Mummy	The Mummy
1933	The Farmerette	Farmerette
1933	Tight Rope Tricks	Acrobat
1933	Silvery Moon	Countess
1935	Dancing on the Moon	Various roles
1938	Bulldozing the Bull	Olive Oyl
1938	All's Fair at the Fair	Mirandy
1938	Sally Swing	Betty Boop
1938	On with the New	Betty Boop
1938	Thrills and Chills	Betty Boop
1938	Cops Is Always Right	Olive Oyl
1939	My Friend the Monkey	Betty Boop
1939	Customers Wanted	Olive Oyl
1939	Aladdin and His Wonderful Lamp	Olive Oyl
1939	Musical Mountaineers	Betty Boop
1939	The Scared Crows	Betty Boop
1939	Ghosks is the Bunk	Betty Boop
1939	Rhythm on the Reservation	Betty Boop
1939	It's the Natural Thing to Do	Olive Oyl
1939	Never Sock a Baby	Swee' Pea
1940	Shakespearean Spinach	Olive Oyl
1940	Females Is Fickle	Olive Oyl
1940	Me Feelins Is Hurt	Olive Oyl
1940	Wimmin Hadn't Oughta Drive	Olive Oyl
1940	Puttin' on the Act	Olive Oyl
1941	All's Well	Baby
1941	Child Psykolojiky	Swee' Pea
1941	Mr. Bug Goes to Town	Mrs. Ladybug
1941	Nix on Hypnotricks	Olive Oyl / Telephone Operator / Bird
1942	Olive Oyl and Water Don't Mix	Olive Oyl
1942	Baby Wants a Bottleship	Olive Oyl
1942	Alona on the Sarong Seas	Olive Oyl
1943	Cartoons Ain't Human	Olive Oyl
1943	The Marry-Go-Round	Olive Oyl
