= Morning, Noon and Night (film) =

- Directed by: Dave Fleischer
- Produced by: Max Fleischer
- Starring: Bonnie Poe (as Betty Boop)
- Music by: David Rubinoff and his Orchestra
- Animation by: David Tendlar; Thomas Johnson
- Color process: Black and white
- Production company: Fleischer Studios
- Distributed by: Paramount Pictures
- Release date: October 6, 1933
- Running time: 7 minutes
- Country: United States
- Language: English

Morning, Noon and Night is a 1933 Fleischer Studios animated short film starring Betty Boop, and featuring the overture Ein Morgen, ein Mittag und ein Abend in Wien (Morning, Noon, and Night in Vienna) by Franz von Suppé.

== Plot ==
The short opens with a brief live-action segment featuring David Rubinoff and his orchestra. A badly hung-over sun (complete with ice-pack on his head) slowly rises over Betty Boop's farm. Betty's farm is a sanctuary for birds, but the sanctuary is soon threatened by the arrival of the Tom Kat's Social Club, a group of hungry cats looking for an easy meal.

They chase a helpless chick back to Betty's farm, who alerts Betty to the danger. The cats initially wreak destruction on the farm, and easily overpower Betty. When the sickly rooster finds out what's happening, he quickly turns into a fighter (boxing gloves and all), and pummels the cats. The other birds join in on the beating, and chase away the hapless cats. The rooster defeats the cat's leader and Betty declares him the winner.
