= Betty in Blunderland =

- Directed by: Dave Fleischer
- Produced by: Max Fleischer
- Starring: Bonnie Poe (Betty Boop)
- Animation by: Roland Crandall; Thomas Johnson
- Color process: Black-and-white
- Production company: Fleischer Studios
- Distributed by: Paramount Publix Corporation
- Release date: April 6, 1934
- Running time: 7 minutes
- Country: United States
- Language: English

Betty in Blunderland is a Fleischer Studios animated short film starring Betty Boop, which was released on the 6th of April in 1934. Also known as Betty in Flunkerland.

It is based on Alice's Adventures in Wonderland and Through the Looking-Glass by Lewis Carroll.

== Plot ==
Betty falls asleep doing a jigsaw puzzle of Alice and the white rabbit. She "awakes" just in time to follow the rabbit through the looking glass and disguises as Alice into a modern wonderland. Betty meets most of the traditional inhabitants of Wonderland and sings "How Do You Do" (to the tune of "Everyone Says I Love You") to them. When the Jabberwock steals Betty away, everyone comes to her rescue. Betty wakes up back in her living room, just in time to prevent the white rabbit from again escaping from her puzzle.

== Quotes ==
- Betty Boop: "Oh, Where am I?"
- Betty Boop: "Thank you!"
- Betty Boop: "Oh, Jam!"
- Betty Boop: "Oh, The crazy Mad Hatter?"

== Cast and crew ==
- Bonnie Poe as Betty Boop
- Max Fleischer (Producer)
- Dave Fleischer (Director)
- Roland Crandall (Animator)
- Thomas Johnson (Animator)

== Music ==
- "Everyone Says I Love You"
- "Hungarian Rhapsody No. 2"
- "Have You Ever Seen a Dream Walking?"
- "The Irish Washerwoman"

== Trivia ==
- Betty in Blunderland has been played in a feature film.
- This is the only cartoon to feature Betty Boop with long hair.
- Betty Boop previously performed "Everyone Says I Love You" in Time On My Hands as performed by Mae Questel.
- This Betty Boop cartoon has the same visuals as Paramount's feature film adaptation.
