= Betty Boop's Rise to Fame =

- Directed by: Dave Fleischer; Animation directed by: Myron Waldman (uncredited)
- Produced by: Max Fleischer
- Starring: Featuring the voice talents of: Mae Questel and Bonnie Poe as Betty Boop; Cab Calloway as the Old Man of the Mountain (archival); Maurice Chevalier as himself Max Fleischer as himself (all uncredited); Additional voice talent: Mae Questel as Billy Boop and Fanny Brice (both archival roles, uncredited)
- Animation by: Uncredited character animation: Lillian Friedman Astor; Al Eugster; Shamus Culhane; Thomas Johnson
- Color process: Black-and-white
- Production company: Fleischer Studios
- Distributed by: Paramount Publix Corporation
- Release date: May 18, 1934
- Running time: 9 minutes
- Country: United States
- Language: English

Betty Boop's Rise to Fame is a 1934 Fleischer Studios animated short film, starring Betty Boop.

== Plot ==
In a live action sequence, a reporter interviewing Max Fleischer asks him about Betty Boop. Max obligingly draws Betty "out of the inkwell" and asks her to perform a couple of numbers. Song and dance numbers from Stopping the Show, Betty Boop's Bamboo Isle, and The Old Man of the Mountain are used.

In the end, Betty jumps back into the inkwell, accidentally splashing ink into the reporter's face.
