= Rhythm on the Reservation =

- Directed by: Dave Fleischer
- Produced by: Max Fleischer
- Starring: Margie Hines; Jack Mercer
- Music by: Sammy Timberg
- Animation by: Graham Place; Myron Waldman
- Color process: Black-and-white
- Production company: Fleischer Studios
- Distributed by: Paramount Pictures
- Release date: July 7, 1939
- Running time: 6 minutes
- Country: United States
- Language: English

Rhythm on the Reservation is a 1939 Fleischer Studios animated short film directed by Dave Fleischer and starring Betty Boop.

The short marks the final theatrical appearance of Betty until her 1988 cameo in Who Framed Roger Rabbit.

== Synopsis ==
Betty Boop's Swing Band visits a Native American reservation. The natives borrow all the musical instruments, but not knowing their real purpose, they find odd uses for them. Betty demonstrates the correct use of the kettle drum and teaches the braves the true meaning of 'rhythm.'
