= Kitty Watson =

American vaudeville comedian (1886–1967)

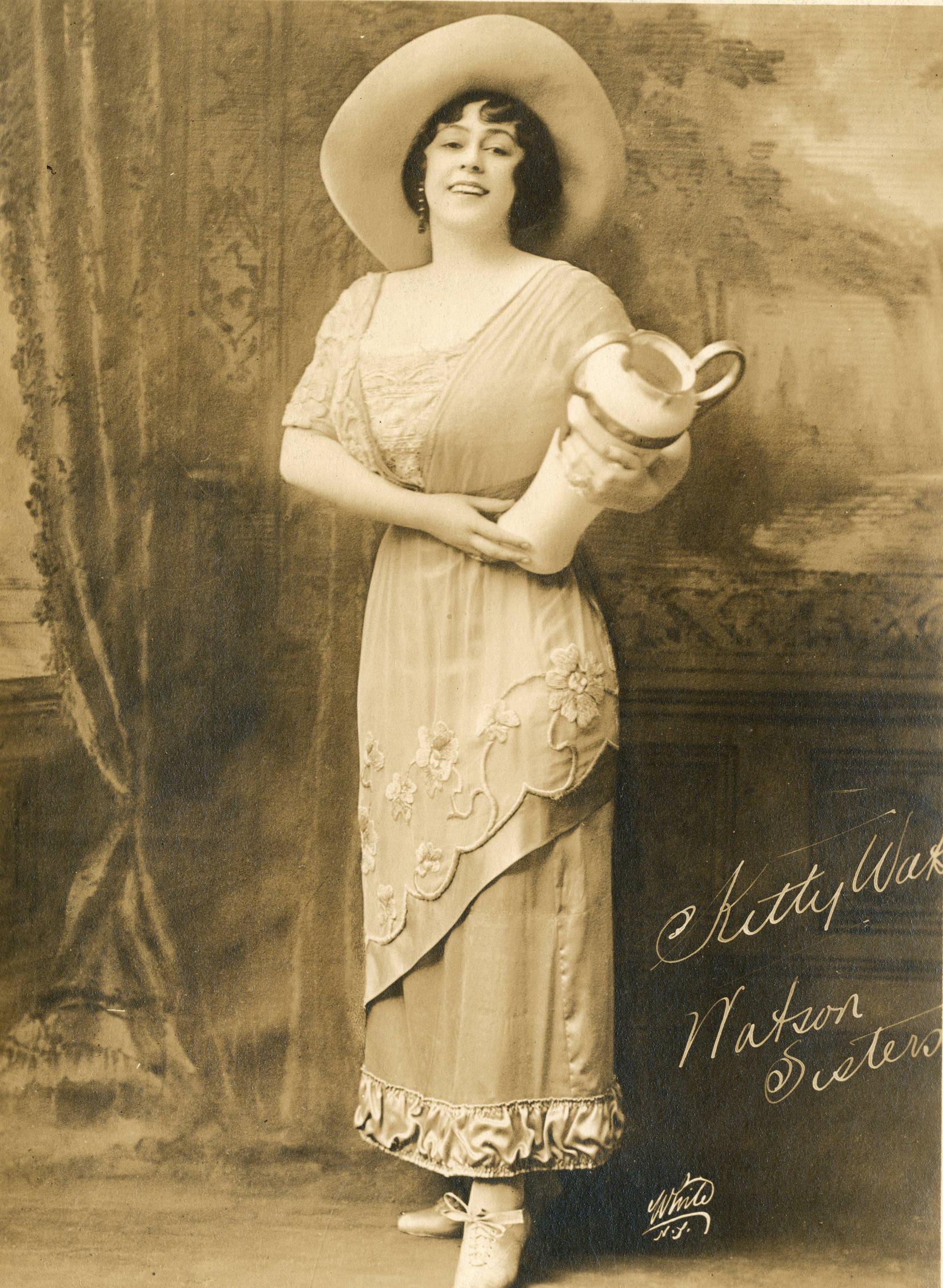
Kitty Watson

Kitty Watson (March 14, 1886–March 3, 1967), also called as Catherine Watson, was an American vaudeville comedian, often appearing with her sister Fanny Watson (1885-1970) as The Watson Sisters.

== Biography ==
Kitty Watson was born on March 14, 1886, in Rochester, New York. During her childhood, she started singing with her sister Fanny . Both began singing in old-style variety. They later became comedians, first in burlesque and then in vaudeville. Both regularly appeared on the Broadway stage and radio as The Watson Sisters.

Kitty Watson acted in II club degli ossessi (1920), La dama dal profumo d'ambra rosa (1920) andII corsaro nero (1921). She also performed at Keith Circuit.

== Films ==
In 1931 the Vitaphone short-subject studio signed Fanny Watson (the stout one of the sister act) and teamed her with comedienne Thelma White for a series of two-reel slapstick comedies, as a sort of female Laurel and Hardy.

In 1933, the Watson Sisters sang "I'm Playing with Fire" in the Max Fleischer Screen Song cartoon Boilesk.

Kitty Watson died on March 3, 1967, in Buffalo, New York. Fanny died in 1970.
