= Betty Boop's Hallowe'en Party =

1933 film

- Directed by: Dave Fleischer
- Produced by: Max Fleischer
- Starring: Bonnie Poe (as Betty Boop)
- Music by: Lou Fleischer; Sammy Timberg
- Animation by: Willard Bowsky; Myron Waldman
- Color process: Black and white
- Production company: Fleischer Studios
- Distributed by: Paramount Pictures
- Release date: November 3, 1933
- Running time: 7 minutes
- Country: United States
- Language: English

Betty Boop's Hallowe'en Party is a 1933 Fleischer Studios animated short film starring Betty Boop.

== Plot ==
It is Halloween, and Jack Frost (in his ice-covered airplane) covers the fields with frost. A chilly scarecrow plucks a wind-blown piece of paper out of the air; it is an invitation to Betty's Hallowe'en party ("p.s., Bring Your Lunch"). Betty is mass-producing jack o'lanterns with the help of her animal friends. The partygoers arrive, and join with Betty in song. Meanwhile, a hulking gorilla gatecrashes the party, and threatens to ruin the evening. Betty disguises as a black cat, and her friends turn the table on the beast, and scare him out the party.

== Production notes ==
Betty sings "Let's All Sing Like the Birdies Sing", which features background vocals sung by fellow voice actress Mae Questel along with a studio chorus.
