= Red Hot Mamma =

- Directed by: Dave Fleischer
- Produced by: Max Fleischer
- Starring: Bonnie Poe (all voices)
- Animation by: Willard Bowsky; David Tendlar
- Color process: Black and white
- Production company: Fleischer Studios
- Distributed by: Paramount Pictures
- Release date: February 2, 1934
- Running time: 8 minutes
- Country: United States
- Language: English

Red Hot Mamma is a 1934 Fleischer Studios Betty Boop animated short directed by Dave Fleischer.

== Plot summary ==
It's a snowy winter's night, and a shivering Betty is trying to sleep. Shutting all the windows isn't enough, so she lights a roaring fire in the fireplace and falls asleep on the hearthplace rug. The heat of the flames soon turns two roosting chickens into roasted chickens, and causes Betty to dream that her fireplace has become the gate to Hell itself. Betty explores the underworld, and sings "Hell's Bells" for Satan and his minions. When Satan tries to put the moves on Betty, she fixes him with a (literally) icy stare, freezing him and all of Hell. When she falls through a hole and onto an icy surface below, Betty wakes up to find the fire out with the windows open and her bed frozen, and she goes to bed, this time under a pile of warm quilts.

== Notes ==
Clips of the redrawn colorized version were used in the compilation movie Betty Boop For President: The Movie (1980).

== Censorship ==
In 1934 the film was rejected by the BBFC in the United Kingdom, because it depicted Hell in a humorous manner, which was deemed blasphemous.
