= Popeye the Sailor (film) =

Popeye the Sailor with Betty Boop
- Directed by: Dave Fleischer
- Produced by: Max Fleischer; Adolph Zukor
- Starring: Billy Costello; William Pennell; Bonnie Poe
- Music by: Sammy Timberg; Sammy Lerner; Tot Seymour; Vee Lawnhurst
- Animation by: Seymour Kneitel; Roland Crandall; Willard Bowsky; William Henning; George Germanetti; Orestes Calpini
- Color process: Black-and-white; Color (1985 redrawn color version)
- Production company: Fleischer Studios
- Distributed by: Paramount Publix Corporation
- Release date: July 14, 1933
- Running time: 7:37
- Country: United States
- Language: English

Popeye the Sailor (titled onscreen as Popeye the Sailor with Betty Boop) is a 1933 animated short produced by Fleischer Studios and distributed by Paramount Publix Corporation. While billed as a Betty Boop cartoon, it was produced as a vehicle for Popeye in his debut animated appearance, who would later establish his own series. Because of this, Betty makes a cameo appearance in the cartoon, while Popeye is the star of the cartoon.

As the cartoon was released in 1933, Popeye's cartoon debut will be in the public domain in 2029.

== Summary ==
The cartoon begins with stock film footage of newspapers rolling off a printing press. The front page of one of the newspapers appears, with a headline declaring that Popeye has become a movie star. The camera zooms in on the illustration of Popeye, which then comes to life, as Popeye (voiced by Billy Costello) sings about his amazing prowess in his signature song "I'm Popeye the Sailor Man".

Popeye's girlfriend Olive Oyl (voiced by Bonnie Poe) arrives at the docks and waits for Popeye. Olive beats 2 animal sailors (a dog sailor and a pig sailor), after Olive declines to go out with either of them. When Popeye's nemesis Bluto (voiced by William Pennell) convinces Olive to go out with him, Olive declines and tries to attack Bluto, but to no avail. When Popeye eventually gets off the ship and goes on a date with Olive, Bluto decides to follow them. Popeye takes Olive to a carnival and pays the peacock 10¢ but Bluto blows off all of the peacock's feathers. They play two games, the high striker and African dodger, with Popeye "winning" both times and then they watch Betty Boop (also voiced by Bonnie Poe) doing the hula. Popeye jumps up on stage, wraps the bearded lady's beard around his waist for a grass skirt and dances with Betty, mimicking her movements. He is then bit by a snake, but then tranquilizes it with his pipe.

Bluto then abducts Olive Oyl and ties her to a railroad track, using the track itself as "ropes", in order to cause a train wreck to kill Olive, where a train is approaching. Popeye fights Bluto and initially loses, but then eats spinach and then punches Bluto, causing him to get trapped in a nailed coffin. He then punches the approaching engine and its baggage car and coaches in the "face", and wrecks the whole train in a crushing halt and sparing Olive's life, because of the can of spinach he ate.

== Production notes ==
- This short also introduces the song "I'm Popeye the Sailor Man", written by Sammy Lerner, loosely based on the first two lines of the "Pirate King" song in Gilbert and Sullivan's operetta, The Pirates of Penzance. It would eventually become Popeye's theme song, with a portion of its instrumental appearing over the opening credits. For this cartoon, and at least one following it, the opening credits theme was an extended instrumental of "The Sailor's Hornpipe" (of which only the first bar was used in the later cartoons) followed by a vocal variation on "Strike Up the Band (Here Comes a Sailor)" substituting the words "for Popeye the Sailor" in the latter phrase. The song was sung twice in the opening credits of this cartoon, first by a deep-voiced singer who sounds like Bluto, and then by Bonnie Poe (as the voice of Betty Boop). It was also heard in the science-fiction film Alien Resurrection (1997) when it is whistled by Dom Vriess. "Barnacle Bill" is used as the recurring theme for Bluto.
- The animation sequence with Popeye singing was reused in the Screen Songs cartoon Let's Sing with Popeye.
- The locomotive featured is a 2-4-2 (American type steam locomotive). These types of steam trains with their wheel arrangement were used most common on U.S. railroads from the 1830s through 1928.
- It is the only Betty Boop cartoon to feature Popeye.
  - It was also excluded from the sale of the Betty Boop cartoons to U.M. & M. TV Corporation in 1955 and was instead sold with the rest of the Popeye cartoons to Associated Artists Productions in 1956. As a result, it was owned separately from the rest of the Betty Boop cartoons until Paramount Skydance (now Skydance Corporation) acquired Warner Bros. Discovery, the then-current owner of the Popeye cartoons, in 2026.
  - Unlike the other Betty Boop redrawn colorized cartoon shorts, the 1985 redrawn color version of the short was produced by MGM/UA Entertainment Co. as part of the Popeye cartoons.
- Popeye was one of several newspaper cartoons that the Fleischers animated (the others included Otto Soglow's The Little King, Carl Thomas Anderson's Henry, and Jimmy Swinnerton's Little Jimmy). In order to increase the chance of Popeye's success, the short was billed as a Betty Boop cartoon, though she is only featured briefly. The short has also been released as Betty Boop Meets Popeye the Sailor.

== Edits ==
- When shown on MeTV in 2021, the African dodger scene was cut.
