= Mother Goose Land =

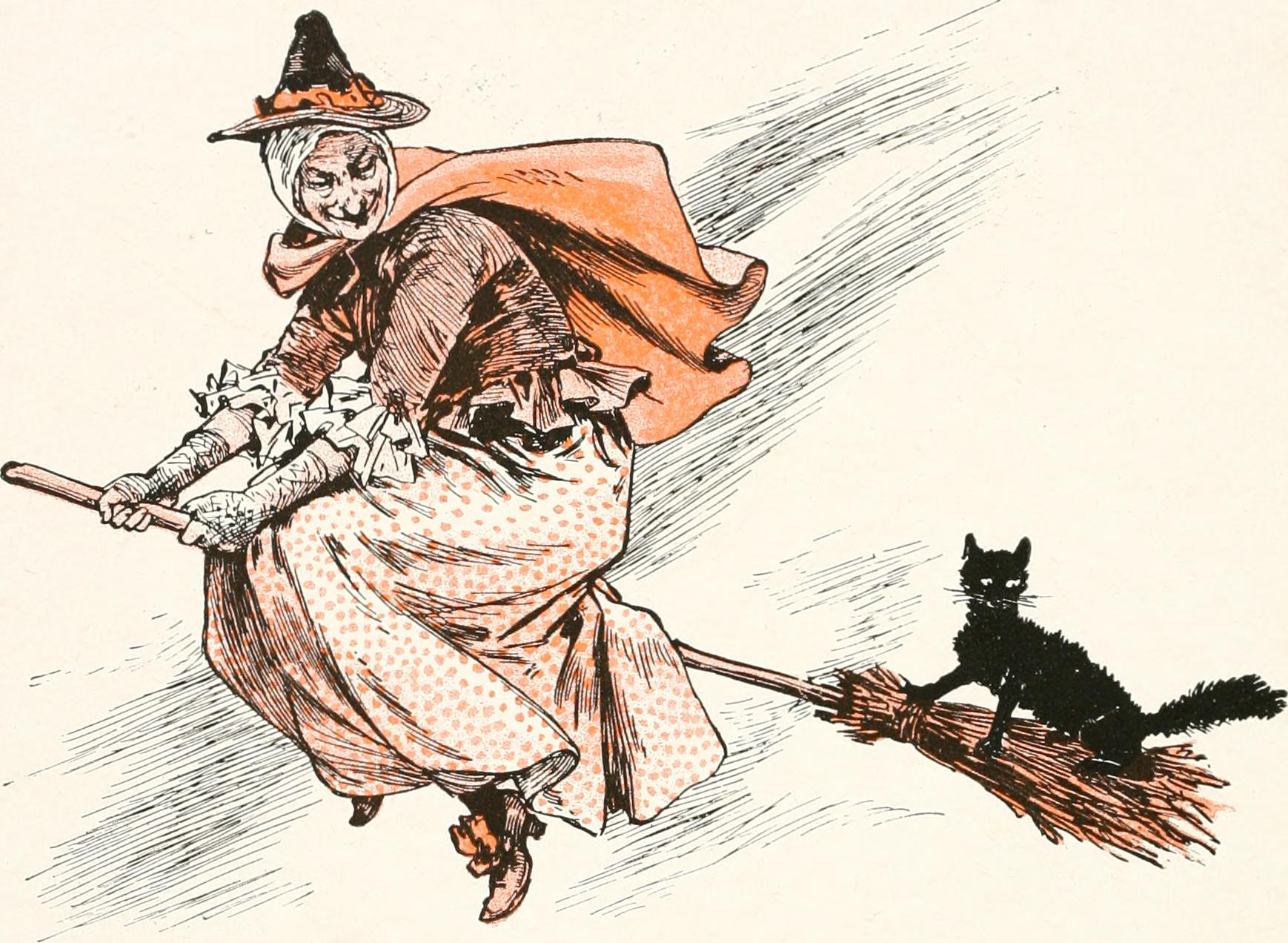
- Directed by: Dave Fleischer; Seymour Kneitel (animation)
- Produced by: Max Fleischer; Adolph Zukor
- Starring: Bonnie Poe
- Music by: George Steiner (uncredited)
- Animation by: Roland Crandall; Seymour Kneitel
- Color process: Black and white
- Production company: Fleischer Studios
- Distributed by: Paramount Pictures
- Release date: June 23, 1933
- Running time: 7 minutes
- Country: United States
- Language: English

Mother Goose Land is a 1933 Fleischer Studios animated short film starring Betty Boop.

== Plot ==
Betty, while reading a book of Mother Goose stories, wishes she could visit such a wonderful place. Betty's wish is granted when Mother Goose appears, and gives her a tour of Mother Goose Land. Betty has a wonderful time until Little Miss Muffet's spider chases her, with lecherous ends in mind. All of the characters are terrified of the spider (during which, the Three Blind Mice are revealed to not be blind at all), but the blackbirds from "Sing a Song of Sixpence" come to Betty's rescue by catching the spider in a web and carrying it in the air, using it like a trampoline until the spider falls through the web. Betty wakes up in bed with all the fairy tale characters surrounding her while dancing, and then they jump back into the book, and when Mother Goose tries to imitate Betty's "boop oop a doop" catchphrase, her hat, wig and dentures fall out.

== Production ==
This is the first of Fleischer Studios' retellings of classic fairy tales starring Betty Boop. Its production number is FL3317. It was originally released theatrically on June 23, 1933.
