= David Rubinoff =

Russian-American violinist (1897–1986)

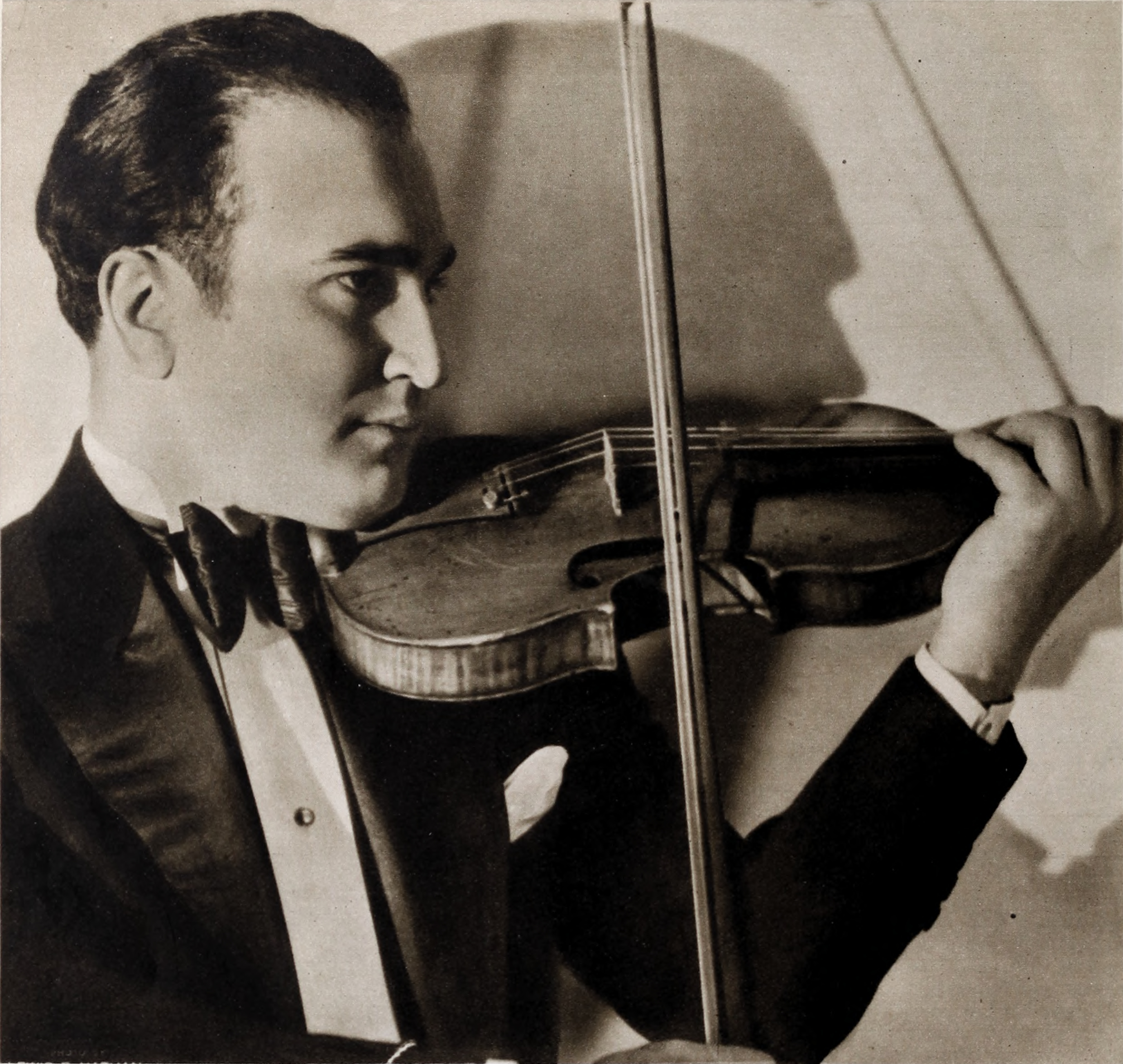
Rubinoff c. 1932

David Rubinoff, also known as Dave Rubinoff (September 3, 1897 – October 6, 1986), was a Russian-American violinist. Rubinoff's performances were heard during the 1930s and 1940s on various radio programs. He also performed in theaters, clubs and schools, and he gave several concerts at the White House during the 1940s. He was sometimes billed as Rubinoff and his Violin.

== Biography ==
Rubinoff was born on September 4, 1897 in Grodno, Russian Empire.

== Radio ==
Rubinoff appeared with his orchestra, dubbed Rubinoff and his Orchestra, becoming a major radio star on The Chase and Sanborn Hour. His radio popularity led to his own show on NBC in 1935-36.

== 1948 tour ==
The Albany Herald gave this account of a Rubinoff personal appearance during the violinist's 1948 tour:

The exuberant musician with his leather-cased violin strode into the lobby of the New Albany Hotel this morning with the poise of a concert musician and the aggressive air of a top-flight general. Mayor James W. “Taxi” Smith, Sam Morris and Bill Buntin of the Exchange Club met the violinist at the door of the elevator. After greeting the Albanians, Mr. Rubinoff began a discussion of cameras and their qualities with Jack Holland, Herald Photographer. At the same time he removed his violin valued at $100,000 from the case. Placing the Stradivarius violin on the shoulder of Mayor Smith, he remarked: “Rubinoff’s violin never played a sour note,” Mayor Smith only gripped and grinned. A “regular guy”, the Russian born violinist immediately conferred with Bill Buntin and Sam Morris of the Exchange Club, sponsor of the concert in the city auditorium today at 8 p.m. and agreed to a complete re-arrangement of his schedule of appearances today. He also made arrangements to appear on the two Albany radio stations, all in a matter of minutes. Mr. Rubinoff is on a tour of the Southeastern part of the nation and will return to California when the tour is over. His wife is expected to join him tonight. Red-headed and from Texas, Mrs. Rubinoff met her husband while she was serving as an usher at a concert which he played in Wichita Falls, Texas, several years ago. When the violinist is on tour he says that he phones his wife every night. His three-year-old son, Rubin Rubinoff, already is studying the violin, said his famous pop. Having the reputation of being a huge eater, the violinist will readily give anyone the hamburger recipe he used to prepare for President Roosevelt when he was a guest at the White House.

=== School Appearances ===
THE HARTEM STAGLITE of Hartsburg, Illinois reports of a school appearance in Lincoln, Illinois in the October 18, 1949 edition of the school newspaper.

The service clubs of Lincoln are sponsoring Rubinoff, the great violinist for a benefit performance for the Rec on October 24. There is a special matinee for students at 3:00 with admission price 75 cents. This concert is at the Lincoln High School Gymnasium.

A follow-up article appeared in the October 31, 1949 edition of THE HARTEM STAGLITE

RUBINOFF PLEASES LARGE AUDIENCE

About 25 students and teachers went to Lincoln Monday afternoon to hear David Rubinoff. He is the world's greatest violinist, as everyone that went realized.

He played several classical pieces which everyone enjoyed. The two favorites of the day were "Don't Fence Me In," which really brought the laughs and "Ah, Sweet Mystery of Life," which brought the "Ah's" from most of the teenagers.

Rubinoff introduced his little "redheaded" son, who is five years old.

Rubinoff's accompanist played a few numbers. The best liked was "Etude in Boogie Woogie", which I'm sure everyone enjoyed.

The concert lasted for about an hour so that everyone could be home early—but were they?

== "Etchings" ==
In 1937 a woman brought a breach of promise lawsuit against Rubinoff, alleging that he had invited her to his apartment to see a collection of etchings, seduced her, and later refused to marry her when she claimed to be pregnant. The case was settled, but "Come up and see my etchings" became a popular catchphrase.

== Film appearances ==
- Morning, Noon and Night (1933) - This Betty Boop cartoon, produced by Fleischer Studios and distributed by Paramount Pictures, includes a segment showing Rubinoff playing the violin
- Parade of the Wooden Soldiers (1933) - Rubinoff appears as himself in this Betty Boop cartoon
- Thanks a Million (1935) - Rubinoff appears as himself in this Hollywood film
- You Can't Have Everything (1937) - Rubinoff appears as himself in this Hollywood film

== Listen to ==
- Rubinoff: "Dance of the Russian Peasant" on YouTube

== Sources ==
- Shapiro, Mitchell E. Radio Network Prime Time Programming, 1926-1967, McFarland & Company, Inc., 2002.
- "Rubinoff to Appear in Lincoln." Hartem Staglite. 18 Oct. 1949. Web.
- "Rubinoff pleases large audience." Hartem Staglite. 31 Oct. 1949. Web.
