= Eddie Borden =

American film actor (1888–1955)

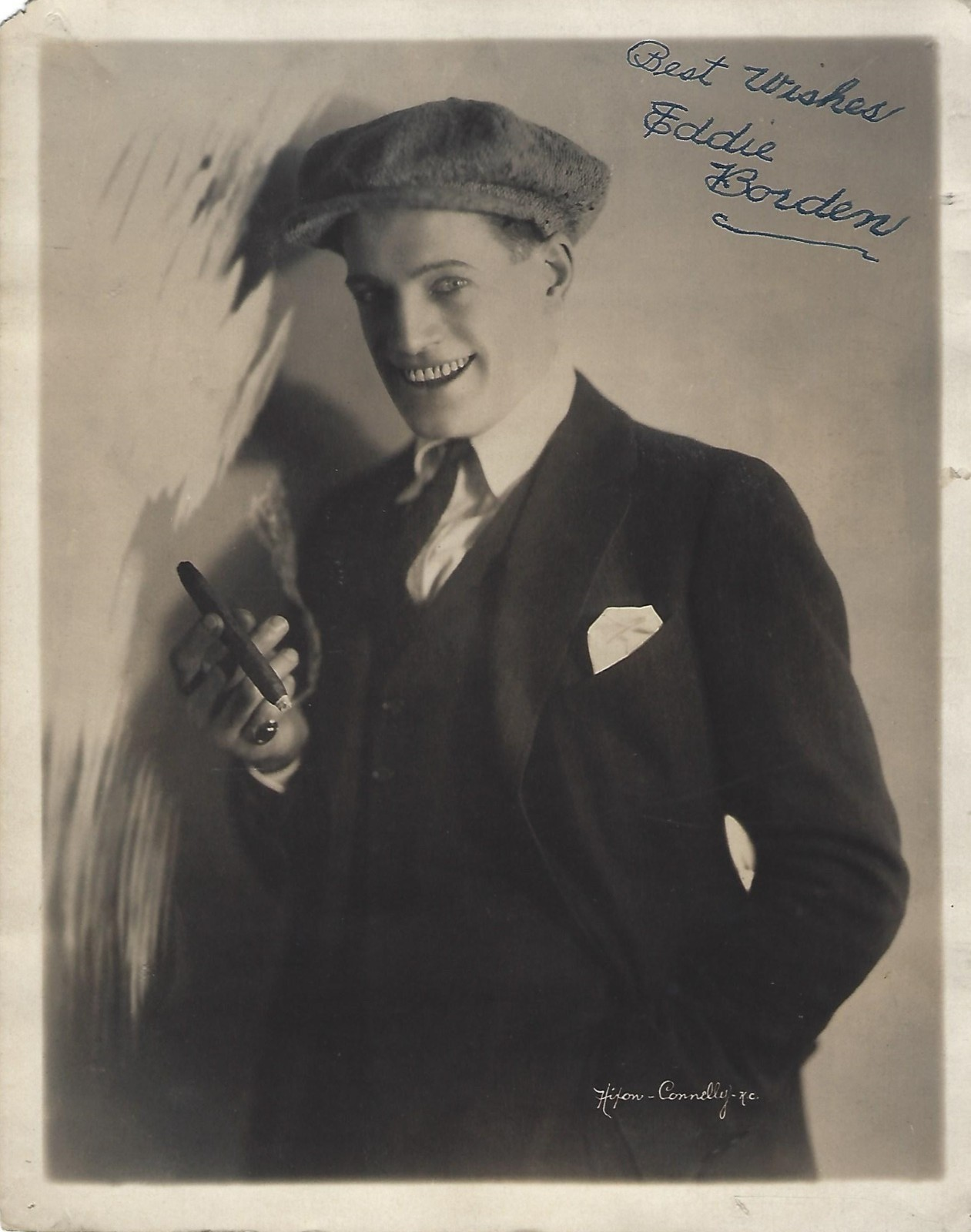
- Eddie Borden Vaudeville Photo
- Born: Edgar Mason Borden; May 1, 1888; Waynesville, Ohio, U.S.
- Died: June 30, 1955 (aged 67); Hollywood, California, U.S.
- Years active: 1922–1952

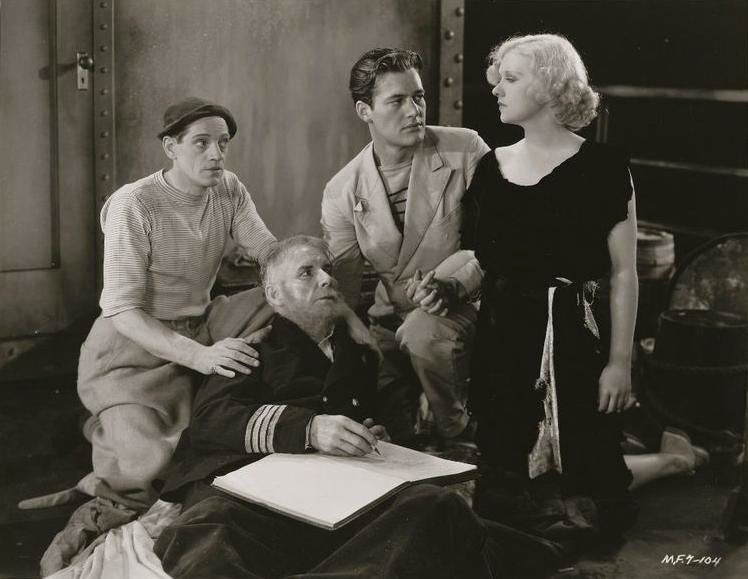
Eddie Borden, Clarence Geldart, Charles Starrett, and Anita Page in Jungle Bride (1933)

Edgar Mason Borden (May 1, 1888 – June 30, 1955) was an American film actor who started his career in vaudeville as an acrobat and then successfully turned to comedy. Throughout the 1920s, he toured in the Keith, Orpheum and Pantages vaudeville circuits, often billed as "the high hat comedian" and the "fun king." Borden appeared in nearly 160 films between 1922 and 1952, primarily in comedic bit parts. Borden appeared in numerous films with Laurel and Hardy.

== Biography ==
He was born on May 1, 1888, in Waynesville, Ohio. (Note: Borden wrote "Waynesville, Ohio" in his 1917 draft registration. The 1920 United States census uses "Ohio". The California Death Index uses "Tennessee" and IMDb uses "Deer Lodge, Tennessee".) His father was from Deer Lodge, Tennessee.

He appeared in nearly 160 films between 1922 and 1952 and was mostly seen in comedic bit parts and occasionally as the principal comic relief in films such as Jungle Bride.

He died on June 30, 1955, aged 67, in Hollywood, California. (Note: IMDb uses July 1, 1955; however, the California Death Index uses June 30, 1955, and is more reliable, since it is indexed from his death certificate.)

== Selected filmography ==
Year	Title	Role	Notes
1925	Hold Everything		Short
1926	Battling Butler	Battling Butler's Manager	
1926	Gigolo	Gideon's Soldier Buddy	Uncredited
1927	One Chance in a Million	Horace Featherby	
1927	The Show Girl	'Breezy' Ayres	
1927	The Dove	Billy	
1930	Rough Romance	Laramie	
1930	The Rampant Age	Eddie Mason	
1931	Transatlantic	Interloper	Uncredited
1931	Monkey Business	Joe	Uncredited
1932	Breach of Promise	Hotel Clerk	
1933	Jungle Bride	Eddie Stevens	
1933	Hollywood on Parade No. A-8	Himself	
1934	Belle of the Nineties	Comedian	Uncredited
1934	Babes in Toyland	Demon Bogeyman	Uncredited
1936	The Bohemian Girl	Nobleman	Uncredited
1937	Way Out West	Barfly	Uncredited
1940	Saps at Sea	Berserk Employee	Uncredited
1940	A Chump at Oxford	Student Ghost	
1940	Secrets of a Model	Customer	Uncredited
1941	The Devil and Daniel Webster	Poker Player	Uncredited
1945	The Dolly Sisters	Man on Bus	Uncredited
1952	On Dangerous Ground	Man	Uncredited
