= Bonnie Poe =

American actress (1915-1993)

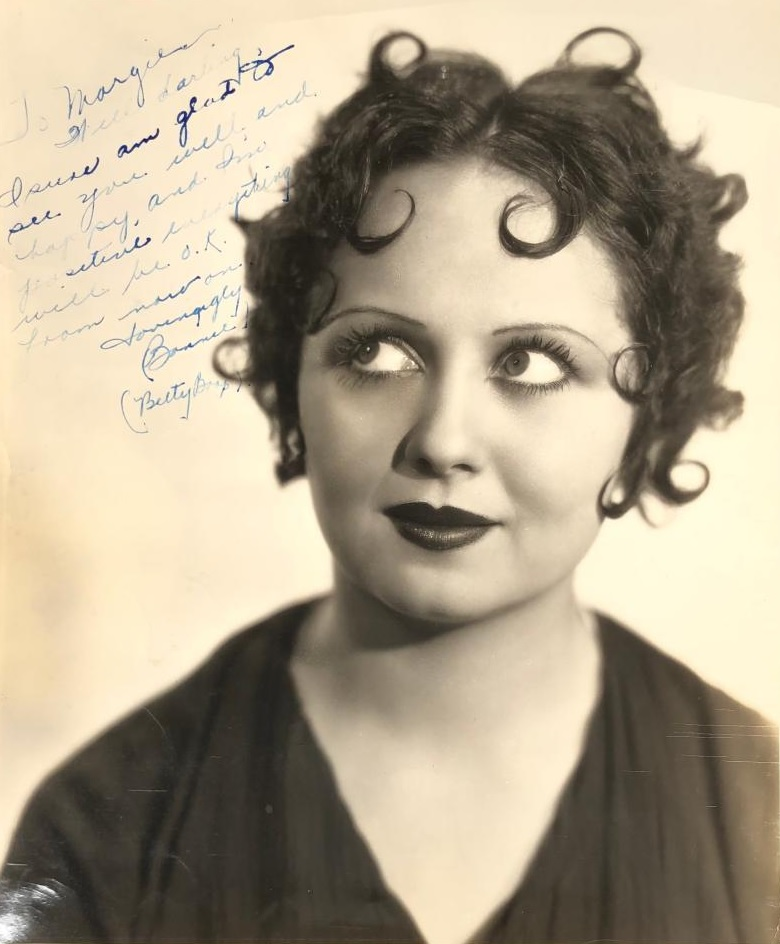
- Poe in 1933
- Born: Clara Rothbart; March 6, 1915; Chicago, Illinois U.S.
- Died: October 16, 1993 (aged 78); Springfield, Illinois U.S.
- Occupation: Actress
- Years active: 1933–1938
- Known for: Betty Boop; Olive Oyl

Clara Rothbart (March 6, 1915 – October 16, 1993) known professionally as Bonnie Poe was an American actress, best known for providing the voice for the Fleischer Studios animated character Betty Boop beginning in 1933, starting with the Popeye the Sailor series and featuring in a dozen cartoons. She voiced her in a live-action segment on the special Hollywood on Parade No. A-8, performing a skit with Bela Lugosi providing a portrayal of Count Dracula.

== Biography ==
Poe was born in Chicago, Illinois, and started as a voice actress for Betty Boop in 1933, including voicing her on a few episodes of an NBC radio special called Betty Boop Fables Poe was the initial voice for the character Olive Oyl in that studio's series of Popeye. Bonnie Poe also portrayed Betty Boop in an on-camera live action short titled Hollywood on Parade No. A-8 in 1933.

Bonnie Poe died from complications connected to pneumonia on October 16, 1993.

== Filmography ==
=== 1933 ===
- Boilesk – various (uncredited)
- Hollywood on Parade No. A-8 – Betty Boop (on-camera)
- Mother Goose Land – Betty Boop (voice, uncredited)
- Morning, Noon and Night – Betty Boop (voice, uncredited)
- Betty Boop's Hallowe'en Party – Betty Boop (voice, uncredited)
- Popeye the Sailor – Betty Boop & Olive Oyl (voice, uncredited)
- I Yam What I Yam – Olive Oyl (voice, uncredited)
- Blow Me Down! – Olive Oyl (voice, uncredited)
- Seasin's Greetinks! – Olive Oyl (voice, uncredited)
- Wild Elephinks – Olive Oyl (voice, uncredited)
- Parade of the Wooden Soldiers – Betty Boop (voice, uncredited)

=== 1934 ===
- She Wronged Him Right – Betty Boop (voice, uncredited)
- Red Hot Mamma – various (voice, uncredited)
- Let's You and Him Fight – Olive Oyl (voice, uncredited)
- Betty in Blunderland – Betty Boop (voice, uncredited)
- Betty Boop's Rise to Fame – Betty Boop (voice, uncredited)
- Strong to the Finich – Olive Oyl (voice, uncredited)
- Betty Boop's Life Guard - Betty Boop (voice, uncredited)
- Poor Cinderella - Betty Boop, Fairy Godmother, Ugly Stepsisters (voice, uncredited)
- Rambling 'Round Radio Row – herself (on-camera)

=== 1935 ===
- Dizzy Divers – Olive Oyl (voice, uncredited)

=== 1938 ===
- Out of the Inkwell – Betty Boop (voice, uncredited)
