= Sammy Lerner =

- Born: Samuel Manuel Lerner; January 28, 1903; Săveni, Kingdom of Romania
- Died: December 13, 1989 (aged 86) Los Angeles, U.S.
- Genres: Musical theatre, film
- Occupations: Composer, songwriter

Samuel Lerner (January 28, 1903 – December 13, 1989) was a Romanian-born songwriter for American and British musical theatre and film. He is best known for his collaborations with Fleischer Studios.

== Career ==
Lerner was born to a Jewish family in Romania. He emigrated with his parents into the United States at age seven, and the family settled in Detroit, Michigan. After graduating from Wayne State University, Lerner moved to New York City, where he began writing songs for vaudeville performers such as Sophie Tucker. Lerner also contributed lyrics to the Ziegfeld Follies.

With the coming of sound film, Lerner began writing songs for motion pictures, including several for use in the Paramount Pictures cartoons produced by Fleischer Studios. Two of these included signature songs for Max Fleischer's most successful cartoon stars, Betty Boop ("Don't Take My Boo-oop-a-doop Away", co-written with Sammy Timberg) and Popeye the Sailor ("I'm Popeye the Sailor Man"). Mr. Lerner composed I'm Popeye the Sailor Man in less than two hours for the cartoonist Dave Fleischer. The lyrics included the line, I'm strong to the finich [sic] 'cause I eats me spinach. Lerner's Popeye theme is particularly well known, and has followed the character into television, feature films, and video games.

Mr. Lerner's work in the 1930s and 1940s included "Is It True What They Say About Dixie?" and English lyrics to "Falling in Love Again (Can't Help It)", Marlene Dietrich's song in the film The Blue Angel.

After writing songs for American features, Lerner moved to London, England in 1936 to write for British musical theatre and film. He returned to America in 1938, and became a member of the executive council at the Dramatists Guild.

== Death ==
Lerner died of cancer in 1989 at the age of 86, in a Los Angeles nursing home.
