= Bluto =

Fictional character from Popeye

Publication information
- Publisher: King Features Syndicate
- First appearance: Thimble Theatre (1932)
- Created by: E. C. Segar
- Voiced by: English: William Pennell (1933–1935); Harry Foster Welch (1934–1940s public events, 1960s Peter Pan Records records); Gus Wickie (1935–1938); Jackson Beck (1935–1936 radio appearances, 1937, 1944–1962 cartoons, 1975, 1989–1990 commercials); Floyd Buckley (1937 Bluebird Records records); Hamp Howard (1939); Pinto Colvig (1939–1940); Tedd Pierce (1940–1942); Lee Royce (1942–1943); Dave Barry (1942–1943); Jack Mercer (1942, 1943, 1954, 1960, 1983); Mae Questel (imitating Olive Oyl in Shape Ahoy); Bob McFadden (Popeye Meets the Man Who Hated Laughter); Allan Melvin (1978–1988); John Wallace (singing voice in 1980 film); Tim Kitzrow (Popeye Saves the Earth); Nicholas Omana (Popeye and the Quest For the Woolly Mammoth, Popeye: The Rescue, Popeye and the Sunken Treasure); Geertjan Hessing ("I'm Popeye The Sailor Man" cover); Dave Redl (Popeye Untold pitch pilots); Keith Scott (Popeye & Bluto's Bilge-Rat Barges, Pandemonium Cartoon Circus); Billy West (Minute Maid commercial); Marc Biagi (Slots from Bally Gaming); Garry Chalk (Popeye's Voyage: The Quest for Pappy); Dave Coulier/Seth Green (Robot Chicken); Kevin Shinick (Mad); Matt McCarthy (The Pete Holmes Show); Aaron LaPlante (2014 animation test); Joe Newton (Popeye's Island Adventures); Matt Hurwitz (World of Warships; Japanese: Tetsuo Nishihama (Popeye the Sailorman/Olive and Bluto's Race Song); Kazuo Kumakura; Hosei Komatsu; Kenji Utsumi; Takuo Kawamura; Yuu Shimaka; Daisuke Gori; Tessho Genda; Taro Ishida; Takeshi Watabe; Masuo Amada

Bluto, at times known as Brutus, is a cartoon and comics character created in 1932 by Elzie Crisler Segar as a one-time character, named "Bluto the Terrible", in his Thimble Theatre comic strip (later renamed Popeye). Bluto made his first appearance on September 12 of that year. Fleischer Studios adapted him the next year (1933) to be the main antagonist of their theatrical Popeye animated cartoon series.

== Character ==
Bluto is a cruel, bearded, muscular ruffian who serves as Popeye's enemy and archrival for the love of Olive Oyl. He usually uses brute force and/or trickery to accomplish his various goals. His voice is very loud, harsh and deep, with an incomprehensible bear-like growl between words and sentences. This voice, as well as the dark beard, crooked teeth, and bulk, was similar to that of the villain Red Flack, well known at the time, played by Tyrone Power Sr. in the 1930 film, The Big Trail.

Bluto, like Popeye, is enamored of Olive Oyl, and he often attempts to kidnap her. However, with the help of some spinach, Popeye usually ends up defeating him. Some cartoons portray Popeye and Bluto as Navy buddies, although in these episodes Bluto usually turns on Popeye when an object of interest (usually Olive) is put between them.

Bluto's strength is portrayed inconsistently. In some episodes, he is weaker than Popeye and resorts to underhanded trickery to accomplish his goals. At other times, Popeye stands no chance against Bluto in a fight until he eats his spinach. In yet other cartoons, the two characters are closely matched, with Bluto eventually gaining the upper hand before Popeye eats his spinach and defeats Bluto. In some shorts, Bluto is a match for Popeye even after he has eaten his spinach. Bluto is sometimes portrayed as having a glass jaw. He has, on occasion, been knocked out by Olive Oyl and even by Popeye's infant ward Swee'Pea. On rare occasions, Bluto tries to sabotage Popeye before confronting him, such as when he tried to thwart his own defeat by using a forklift to steal Popeye's store of spinach cans and disposing of them in a garbage dump. In one case, Popeye forces a defeated Bluto to consume spinach, after which Bluto easily beats up Popeye, resulting in Olive pitying him and choosing him over Bluto.

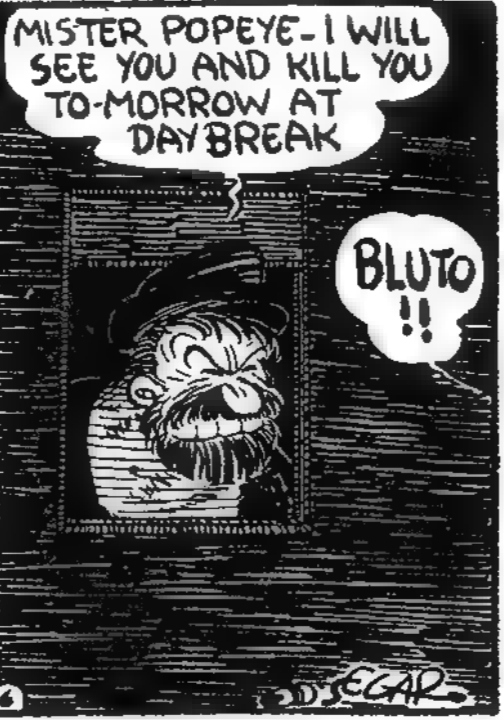
Bluto's first appearance: Thimble Theatre comic strip, September 12, 1932 (last panel)

In most cases, the name "Bluto" is used as a first name. In cartoons where Bluto portrays alternate characters, or "roles," the name can be used as a surname, as with lumberjack "Pierre Bluto" in the cartoon Axe Me Another and etiquette teacher "Professor Bluteau" in Learn Polikeness.

== Bluto vs. Brutus ==
After the theatrical Popeye cartoon series ceased production in 1957, Bluto's name was changed to Brutus because at the time it was believed by King Features that Paramount Pictures, distributors of the Fleischer Studios (later Famous Studios) cartoons, owned the rights to the name "Bluto". King Features actually owned the name, as Bluto had been originally created for the comic strip. Due to a lack of thorough research, King Features failed to realize this and reinvented him as Brutus to avoid potential copyright problems. "Brutus" (often pronounced "Brutusk" by Popeye) appears in the 1960–62 Popeye the Sailor television cartoons with his physical appearance changed, making him obese rather than muscular. He normally sported a blue shirt and brown pants.

The character reverted to Bluto for Hanna-Barbera's The All-New Popeye Hour (1978–83) and the 1980 live-action Popeye movie, as well as the 1987 Popeye and Son series also by Hanna-Barbera. The character was also named Bluto in the 2004 movie Popeye's Voyage: The Quest for Pappy.

It was long accepted that Bluto and Brutus were one and the same. However, a 1988 Popeye comic book, published by Ocean Comics, presented the two characters as twin brothers. The Popeye comic strip, at the time written and drawn by Hy Eisman, generally featured only Brutus, but added Bluto as Brutus' twin brother in several 2008 and 2009 strips. The two continue to appear as brothers in the more recent strips by Randy Milholland.

== Voice ==
In the Paramount theatrical cartoons, Bluto was voiced by a number of actors, including William Pennell, Gus Wickie, Jackson Beck (who took over the role in 1944), Hamp Howard, Pinto Colvig, Tedd Pierce, Lee Royce, Dave Barry, and Jack Mercer. Beck also supplied the voice for Brutus in the early 1960s. In the 1980 live-action movie, he was portrayed by Paul L. Smith. In The All-New Popeye Hour and Popeye and Son, he was voiced by Allan Melvin. In Popeye's Voyage: The Quest for Pappy, he was voiced by Garry Chalk.

== Other characters ==
In the animated cartoons, Popeye's foe is almost always Bluto functioning in some capacity (fellow sailor, generic thug, carnival hypnotist, sheik, lecherous instructor, etc.). However, in the Famous-era shorts, there are also "original" one-time characters with Bluto-like personalities and mannerisms, such as the blond, beardless lifeguard in "Beach Peach". Jackson Beck voiced these characters using the same voice.

In the comics, Bluto and Brutus have a brother, Bruto, who is older than Brutus. Brutus is the youngest of four brothers. Burlo is Bluto's twin.
