= Billy Costello (actor) =

American actor (1898–1971)

- Inscribed photograph of Billy Costello (1942)
- Born: William Arnold Costello; February 2, 1898; Rhode Island, U.S.
- Died: October 9, 1971 (aged 73); San Jose, California, U.S.
- Resting place: Mariposa District Cemetery; Mariposa, California, U.S.
- Occupation: Actor
- Years active: 1921–1940s
- Known for: Voice of Popeye the Sailor

William Arnold Costello (February 2, 1898 – October 9, 1971), commonly known as "Red Pepper Sam", was an American actor and the original voice of Popeye the Sailor in animated cartoons.

== Life and career ==
Costello was born on February 2, 1898, in Rhode Island to William E. and Susan B. (née Steere) Costello. In addition to voice acting, he worked as a vaudeville performer under the name "Red Pepper Sam". In the early 1930s, he also played drums with the Fred Waring Orchestra. Costello had worked with the Fleischer Studios as the voice of Gus the Gorilla on the Betty Boop radio show, and they felt that the raspy voice he had used for that character would work for a series of cartoons based on Popeye (created by E.C. Segar) they were planning. He was cast to provide the voice for the first Popeye cartoon, 1933's Popeye the Sailor. Costello then appeared in the next 24 Popeye shorts before he was fired by the Fleischers, allegedly over "bad behavior". Although he never received onscreen credit, Costello knew of Popeye's international popularity and reputedly became difficult to work with, demanding more money and days off in the middle of a recording session. He was replaced with Jack Mercer, who was working in the studio. Costello's final appearance as Popeye was in You Gotta Be a Football Hero (1935).

However, Costello was not prepared to give up the fame associated with voicing Popeye and, billed as "The Original Voice of Popeye", he voiced the character on a European stage tour and made several recordings for the Columbia, Decca, and Rex labels, including "I'm Popeye the Sailor Man" (1935), "Blow the Man Down" (1935), "Tiger Rag" (1936), and "The Merry Go Round Broke Down" (1937), which, to avoid copyright problems in the US, were only marketed overseas. For nearly a decade, he was based in London.

== Billy "Uke" Carpenter ==
Billy "Uke" Carpenter is believed to be a stage name of Costello. Carpenter was a ukulele player of note during the 1920s, known for his performances in the "eefin" style, which was also practiced by Cliff Edwards. "Uke" had been paired musically with Aileen Stanley and with Gene Austin and had several recordings released under such pseudonyms as "Red Pepper Sam" and "Ukulele Sam."

== Later life and death ==
With the start of World War II, Costello returned to the United States, where for a short period he toured the dinner theatre circuit.

From 1959 until his death, he managed a trailer park in San Jose, California, and there he died on October 9, 1971. He was buried in the Mariposa District Cemetery in Mariposa, California.
