= Olive Oyl =

Character from Popeye

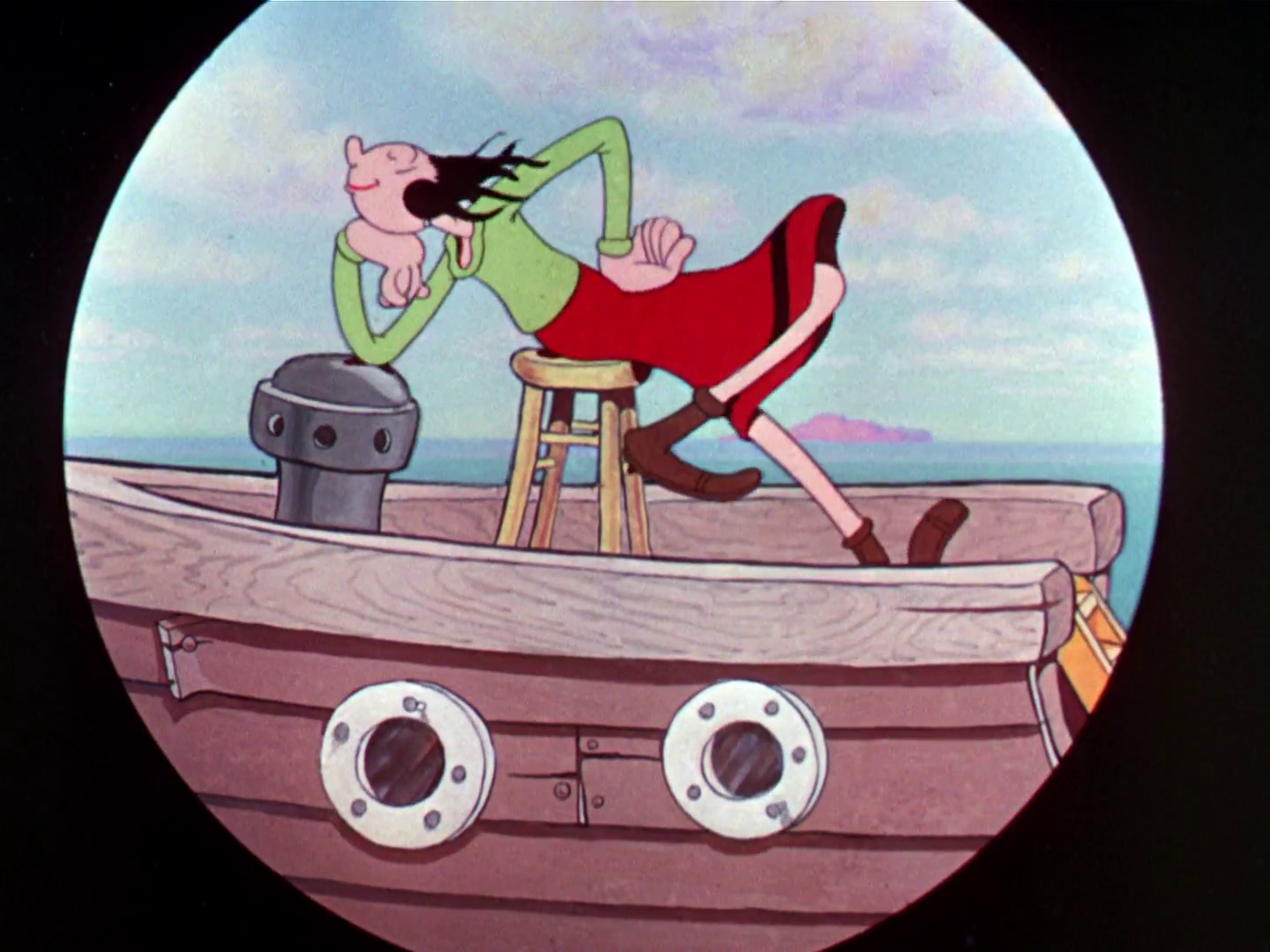
- Olive Oyl in Popeye the Sailor Meets Sindbad the Sailor (1936)

Publication information
- Publisher: King Features Syndicate
- First appearance: Thimble Theatre (1919)
- Created by: E. C. Segar
- Voiced by: English: Bonnie Poe (1933–1934); Mae Questel (1933–1938, 1944–1962, 1983); Miriam Wolfe (1936–1937, radio only); Marge Hines (1938–1943); Marilyn Schreffler (1978–1988); Cheryl Chase (Popeye and the Quest For the Woolly Mammoth, Popeye: The Rescue, Popeye and the Sunken Treasure); Tabitha St. Germain (Popeye's Voyage: The Quest for Pappy); Grey DeLisle (2014 animation test); Japanese: Yumi Murata (Popeye the Sailorman/Olive and Bluto's Race Song); Hisako Kyoda; Yoshiko Yamamoto; Rika Fukami; Emiko Kanno; Yuko Mizutani; Kotono Mitsuishi; Mariko Mukai; Gara Takashima; Michi Yamamura; Mayumi Shinozuka; Sakiko Uran

In-story information
- Partnerships: Popeye (boyfriend); Swee'Pea (son); Popeye Junior (son)
- Supporting character of: Castor Oyl (brother); Cole Oyl (father); Nana Oyl (mother); Deezil Oyl (niece); Violet Oyl (niece)

Olive Oyl is a cartoon character created by E. C. Segar in 1919 for his comic strip Thimble Theatre. The strip was later renamed Popeye after the sailor character that became the most popular member of the cast; however, Olive Oyl was a main character for a decade before Popeye's 1929 appearance.

== Fictional character biography ==
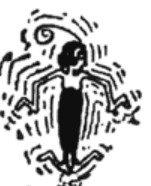
Olive Oyl in her debut (strip printed December 19, 1919)

In the strip as written by Segar, Olive is a scrappy, headstrong young woman (her age varying between her late teens and 26) visually characterized by her exaggeratedly slim build (evolving from its previous more realistically proportioned form by the late 1920s) and her long black hair (usually presented as rolled in a neat bun, like her mother's). She is the youngest sibling of Castor Oyl and Crude Oyl.

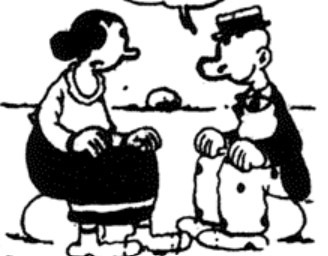
Olive Oyl and Hamgravy in a 1921 "Thimble Theatre" strip

Debuting on December 19, 1919, Olive was the childhood sweetheart and more-or-less fiancée of original Thimble Theatre protagonist Harold Hamgravy (Ham Gravy), a "lounge lizard" or slacker type who did as little work as possible and was always borrowing money. His attraction to other women—particularly if they were rich—naturally incensed Olive, leading her to (in a storyline run in mid-1928) succumb to a fit of "lunaphobia" (a kind of angry madness) over one of his amours; when she recovered, she continued to pretend to have the disorder to win him back. She was not immune to flattery from other men, but remained committed to Hamgravy on-and-off until Popeye's appearance. Olive and Popeye initially greeted each other with animosity (her first words to him being "take your hooks offa me or I'll lay ya in a scupper"), leading them to fight bitterly for weeks before finally realizing that they had feelings for each other. Following a series of Sunday strips run in March 1930, Popeye would definitively supersede Ham as Olive's lover, a position he occupies within the comic into the present; Ham had largely vanished from the daily strip six months earlier, although Popeye and Olive's relationship would nonetheless not be emphasized within the daily strip's continuity until the height of the Clint Gore story arc in January 1931.

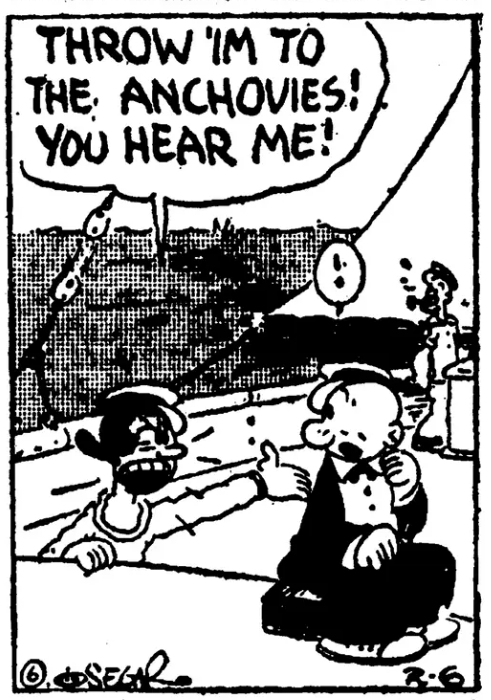
An early comic panel, prior to Olive and Popeye being established as lovers, in which Olive demands Castor throw Popeye overboard

The version of Olive Oyl most widely familiar is the coyer and more nervous version from the theatrical animated cartoons created by Fleischer Studios and continued by Famous Studios. Unlike most modern damsels in distress, Olive Oyl is tall and skinny, with tightly wound hair and enormous feet (the latter sometimes used to comedic effect). Popeye's comment about her measurements is that she is a perfect 57... 19-19-19.

In the films and later television cartoons, Olive Oyl is usually Popeye's girlfriend, although she could be extremely fickle, depending on who could woo her the best or had the flashier possessions, and she was prone to become angry with Popeye over seemingly minor issues. She constantly gets kidnapped by Bluto (aka Brutus), who is Popeye's arch-rival for her affections; when she gets angry with Popeye for whatever goes wrong, it's usually as a result of Bluto's trickery, but Popeye always rescues her and wins back her affection in the process.

In the cartoons, she helps take care of a baby named Swee'Pea or she usually asks Popeye to take care of him if she's too busy; it is unknown if Swee'Pea is Olive Oyl's biological or adopted son. In the comics, Swee'Pea is a foundling under Popeye's care. Later sources (mostly in the cartoon series) say that Swee'Pea is Olive Oyl's cousin or nephew that she has to take care of from time to time.

Like Popeye, there are times where Olive gains superhuman strength from eating spinach.

== History of the character ==
Olive Oyl is named after olive oil, used commonly in cooking or in salads. Segar's newspaper strips also featured a number of her relatives named after other oils, including her brother, Castor Oyl, their mother, Nana Oyl (after "banana oil", a mild slang phrase of the time used in the same way as "horsefeathers", i.e. "nonsense"), their father, Cole Oyl, and Castor's estranged wife, Cylinda Oyl; more recently, Olive's nieces Diesel Oyl and Violet Oyl have appeared in the cartoons. Also among Olive's family are her two uncles, Otto (Auto) Oyl and intrepid explorer Lubry Kent Oyl. Lubry Kent's gift to Castor and Olive, a lucky Whiffle Hen, led them into the adventure where they met Popeye. When Bobby London took over the strip from 1986 to 1992, he added the sultry blonde Sutra Oyl, Olive's cousin, and Standard Oyl, a distant relative who was an extremely wealthy corporate magnate.

== Portrayals ==
The first two Popeye cartoons, Popeye the Sailor (1933) and I Yam What I Yam (1933), featured Bonnie Poe as the voice of Olive Oyl. She was thereafter voiced by character actress Mae Questel (who also voiced Betty Boop and other characters). Questel styled Olive's voice and delivery after those of actress ZaSu Pitts.

In 1938, Margie Hines took over as the voice of Olive Oyl, starting with the cartoon Bulldozing the Bull. Questel returned as her voice in 1944, starting with the cartoon The Anvil Chorus Girl. Questel would remain so until after the King Features Syndicate made-for-TV Popeye shorts in 1960.

Marilyn Schreffler became the new voice of Olive when Hanna-Barbera obtained the rights to produce made-for-television Popeye cartoons for The All-New Popeye Hour in 1978. Schreffler also voiced Olive in Popeye and Son. Questel was asked by Hanna-Barbera to reprise her role, but turned them down due to her busy work schedule. Despite being replaced by Schreffler, Questel later returned to voice Olive Oyl for a 1983 commercial promoting the Popeye video game.

In the 1980 musical live-action feature film Popeye, Olive is portrayed by Shelley Duvall opposite co-star Robin Williams as her lover Popeye. In Popeye's Voyage: The Quest for Pappy, she was voiced by Tabitha St. Germain.

=== Additional actors ===
- Harry Foster Welch (1934–1940s, 1960s; public events, Peter Pan Records records)
- Olive LaMoy (1935–1937; Popeye the Sailor radio show, Bluebird Records records)
- Miriam Wolfe (1936–1937; Popeye the Sailor radio show)
- Arnold Stang (1943; one line in The Marry-Go-Round)
- Ginny Tyler (1957; "I'm Popeye The Sailor Man" cover)
- Jack Mercer (1960; Popeye's Zoo)
- Corinne Orr (1972, 1975; Popeye Meets the Man Who Hated Laughter, Popeyes commercials)
- Ruth Edinger (1977; Christmas with Popeye)
- Yumi Murata (1978; Popeye the Sailorman/Olive and Bluto's Race Song)
- Cherry Davis (1987, 1989–1990s, 2000s; Solo commercial, 1-900 Hotline commercial, Quaker Oats commercials, Center for Marine Conservation commercial, Cartoon Network bumpers)
- Linda Peretz (1992; Popeye y Olivia)
- Zofia Bil (1994; Popeye Saves the Earth)
- Cheryl Chase (1997–1998; Popeye and the Quest For the Woolly Mammoth, Popeye: The Rescue, Popeye and the Sunken Treasure)
- Frank Caruso (1998; Popeye Untold pitch pilot)
- Debbi Fuhrman (1998; Popeye Untold pitch pilot)
- Sandy Fox (1999; Popeye & Bluto's Bilge-Rat Barges, Pandemonium Cartoon Circus)
- Lani Minella (2002; Slots from Bally Gaming)
- Shannon Cullem (2004; Boop-Oop-a-Dooin')
- Kelly Hu (2005, 2007–2008; Robot Chicken)
- Robyn Gryphe (2006; United States Power Squadrons radio spots)
- Diane Michelle (2007; Prego commercials)
- Jamie Lee (2014; The Pete Holmes Show)
- Grey DeLisle (2014; animation test)
- Sarah Stiles (2016; Fleischerei)
- Tara Strong (2016; Robot Chicken)
- Seth Green (2019; Robot Chicken)
- Ayami Nakajo (2021–2023; Ajinomoto commercials)
- Teresa Appel (2021; video game)

== Appearance ==
In her Famous Studios appearance, Olive is given more hair, smaller feet, wider eyes, a more feminine face, a tomboyish streak and a slightly less silly personality. She has black hair with a red bow. She wears a red shirt with short sleeves, black skirt with a red line on the bottom and black pumps. In later animated cartoons from King Features and Hanna-Barbera, while they would occasionally retain aspects of her Famous Studios incarnation, such as her hairstyles, Olive generally reverted to her original enormous feet, pinned-back-with-a-bun hairdo, tall flat brown boots and white socks.

== Personality ==
- Olive Oyl is absent-minded, sweet, flirtatious, short-tempered, romantic, headstrong, foolish, shallow, pompous, sassy, inattentive, fickle, demanding, and selfish. She is usually depicted as a stereotypical "damsel-in-distress" character and often blames others for her own mistakes when confronted.
- She frequently says "Oh, dear!" in a way that resembles film actress ZaSu Pitts.

== Other appearances ==
- In the 1980 live-action film directed by Robert Altman, Olive Oyl is played by actress Shelley Duvall. Shelley Duvall has mentioned that she was teased in school as Olive Oyl because of her physical resemblance to the character.

Shelley Duvall as Olive Oyl in the 1980 Popeye film

- Olive Oyl made a non-speaking cameo in the Harvey Birdman, Attorney at Law episode "Droopy Botox".
- In 1997–1998, Olive Oyl appeared in the video games Popeye and the Quest For the Woolly Mammoth, Popeye: The Rescue and Popeye and the Sunken Treasure, voiced by Cheryl Chase.
- In 2006, King Features produced both a radio spot and industrial for the United States Power Squadrons featuring Robyn Gryphe as Olive and Allen Enlow as Popeye.
- Olive Oyl (along with Popeye, Bluto, and Wimpy) was going to have a cameo in Who Framed Roger Rabbit, but the rights to the characters could not be obtained.
- In 2002, Olive Oyl appeared in the video game Slots from Bally Gaming, voiced by Lani Minella.
- In July 2007, a live-animation TV commercial starring Olive Oyl aired as part of an advertising campaign for Campbell's's Prego sauces. Olive's ad is one in a series of five different ads for Prego, which features Spice Girl Emma Bunton ("Baby Spice"), Olympic Silver Medalist Lea Ann Parsley, an average American couple named Rosemary and Herb and an Englishman named Basil. In each 15-second commercial, the "flavorful" characters wonder aloud about what spice to add to their simmering pot of sauce. She was voiced by Diane Michelle.
- Olive Oyl appeared in the Robot Chicken episodes "The Sack" and "Squaw Bury Shortcake", voiced by Kelly Hu.
- In The Office, Pam Beesly (portrayed by Jenna Fischer) dresses up as Olive Oyl during the season 7 episode "Costume Contest".

== Parodies ==
In MAD Magazine No. 21 (1951), a parody of Olive called "Mazola Oil" appeared in Poopeye. Mazola supplies Poopeye with various spinach recipes to help Poopeye defeat other comic strip characters such as "Mammy Jokeum" (a parody of "Mammy Yokum" from Li'l Abner), "Melvin of the Apes" (a parody of Tarzan) and "Superduperman" (a parody of Superman). The story was reprinted in the paperback MAD Strikes Back (1962), which was later reprinted in a 50th Anniversary Edition (iBooks, Inc., New York, ISBN 0-7434-4478-7).
