= William Pennell =

American actor

- Born: March 3, 1889; Macon, Georgia
- Died: September 5, 1956 (aged 67)
- Occupations: Voice actor, singer
- Years active: 1930–1940

William Pennell (March 3, 1889 – September 5, 1956) was an American voice actor and baritone singer, who was the original voice of the character Bluto on the animated Popeye shorts produced by Fleischer Studios. At the time, Pennell sang in a vocal quartet which was used by Paramount Pictures. Gus Wickie replaced Pennell as Bluto from 1935.
