= 1935 in animation =

Events in 1935 in animation.

== Events ==
=== January ===
- January 5: Wilfred Jackson's The Tortoise and the Hare, produced by Walt Disney Animation Studios, premieres.

=== February ===
- February 23: Wilfred Jackson's The Band Concert, produced by the Walt Disney Animation Studios, premieres. It stars Mickey Mouse performing an orchestra in the park, while Donald Duck and later a tornado cause mayhem. The short is the first Mickey Mouse cartoon animated entirely in color.
- February 27: 7th Academy Awards: Wilfred Jackson's The Tortoise and the Hare, produced by Walt Disney Animation Studios, wins the Academy Award for Best Animated Short Film.

=== March ===
- March 2: Friz Freleng's I Haven't Got a Hat, produced by Leon Schlesinger Productions premieres. The film marks the debuts of Porky Pig and Beans the Cat.
- March 16: Ben Sharpsteen's Mickey's Service Station, starring Mickey Mouse, Donald Duck, Peg-Leg Pete and Goofy, produced by Walt Disney Animation Studios, premieres.
- March 25: Alexander Ptushko's The New Gulliver premieres, a stop-motion adaptation of Gulliver's Travels.

=== May ===
- May 25: Ben Sharpsteen's The Cookie Carnival, produced by Walt Disney Animation Studios, premieres.

=== June ===
- June 17: The Oswald the Lucky Rabbit cartoon Towne Hall Follies, produced by Walter Lantz Productions, premieres. This was the first short film to be directed by famed animator Tex Avery.
- June 22: Jack King's Buddy's Bug Hunt, produced by Leon Schlesinger Productions is released, it's notable for being the first cartoon in the Looney Tunes franchise to feature the Acme name.
- June 26: David Hand's Who Killed Cock Robin?, produced by Walt Disney Animation Studios, premieres.
- June 28: The Fleischer Studios release For Better or Worser, which marks the first use of their patented stereoptical process, where a diorama is used to give the illusion of characters walking in front of it.

=== July ===
- July 13: Wilfred Jackson's Mickey's Garden, starring Mickey Mouse and Pluto, produced by Walt Disney Animation Studios, premieres.

=== August ===
- August 3: Ben Sharpsteen's Mickey's Fire Brigade, starring Mickey Mouse, Donald Duck and Goofy, produced by Walt Disney Animation Studios, premieres.
- August 10–September 1: 3rd Venice International Film Festival: The Disney cartoon The Band Concert, directed by Wilfred Jackson, is awarded a special Golden Medal and an award for Best Animation.
- August 16: Betty Boop and Grampy, directed and produced by the Fleischer Brothers, premieres. In this cartoon Betty Boop visits Grampy, who makes his debut.
- August 31: David Hand's Pluto's Judgement Day, starring Mickey Mouse and Pluto, produced by Walt Disney Animation Studios, premieres. Despite being an official Mickey Mouse cartoon, the plot revolves around Pluto, with him being tortured by hellish cats in a nightmare.

=== September ===
- September 6: Len Lye's experimental animated film A Colour Box premieres, produced by GPO Film Unit.
- September 14: Jack King's A Cartoonist's Nightmare, produced by Leon Schlesinger Productions, is first released. This self-reflexive animated cartoon features an animator being tormented by his creations in a nightmare.
- September 23: Tex Avery's Oswald the Lucky Rabbit cartoon The Quail Hunt, produced by Walter Lantz Productions, premieres. This was Avery's last film for Walter Lantz Productions as he had left to go work at Leon Schlesinger Productions.
- September 28: Ben Sharpsteen's On Ice, starring Mickey Mouse, Donald Duck and Goofy, produced by Walt Disney Animation Studios, premieres.
- September 30: Ub Iwerks' Balloon Land premieres. In this cartoon an evil pincushion man tries to kill anthropomorphic balloons.

=== October ===
- October 5: Wilfred Jackson's Music Land, produced by the Walt Disney Animation Studios, premieres. In this short the Land of Symphony and the Isle of Jazz fight a battle.
- October 26: David Hand's Three Orphan Kittens, produced by Walt Disney Animation Studios, premieres.

=== November ===
- November 2: The Porky Pig & Beans cartoon Gold Diggers of '49, produced by Leon Schlesinger Productions, premieres. It was both Tex Avery's directional debut for Warner Bros. and the start of a wackier style of comedy at Warners' animation studio.
- November 16: Friz Freleng's Merrie Melodies cartoon Billboard Frolics, produced by Leon Schlesinger Productions premieres, it features the first use of the song Merrily We Roll Along which will later become the series theme music.
- November 22: Betty Boop with Henry, the Funniest Living American, directed and produced by the Fleischer Brothers, premieres. it features an animated adaptation of Carl Anderson's comic series Henry.
- November 30: Ben Sharpsteen's Cock o' the Walk, produced by Walt Disney Animation Studios, premieres.

=== December ===
- December 14: Ben Sharpsteen's Broken Toys, produced by Walt Disney Animation Studios, premieres.

=== Specific date unknown ===
- The Camel's Dance is released, directed by the Wan Brothers. It's the first sound cartoon produced in China.

== Films released ==
- 5 January – The Tortoise and the Hare (United States)
- 7 January – Robinson Crusoe Isle (United States)
- 9 January – Hey-Hey Fever (United States)
- 11 January – The First Snow (United States)
- 12 January – Buddy of the Legion (United States)
- 18 January:
  - Baby Be Good (United States)
  - The Gloom Chasers (United States)
- 19 January:
  - Mickey's Man Friday (United States)
  - Mr. and Mrs. Is the Name (United States)
  - The Shoemaker and the Elves (United States)
- 25 January:
  - Beware of Barnacle Bill (United States)
  - What A Night (United States)
- 1 February:
  - The Bird Man (United States)
  - The Hillbilly (United States)
- 2 February – Little Black Sambo (United States)
- 6 February – The Bull Fight (United States)
- 9 February – Country Boy (United States)
- 15 February – Taking the Blame (United States)
- 16 February:
  - Buddy's Theatre (United States)
  - When the Cat's Away (United States)
- 22 February:
  - Be Kind to "Aminals" (United States)
  - Fireman, Save My Child (United States)
- 23 February – The Band Concert (United States)
- 1 March:
  - The Gold Getters (United States)
  - The Song of the Birds (United States)
- 2 March:
  - I Haven't Got a Hat (United States)
  - The Bremen Town Musicians (United States)
- 8 March:
  - The Lost Chick (United States)
  - The Moth and the Spider (United States)
- 9 March – Buddy's Pony Express (United States)
- 11 March – Two Little Lambs (United States)
- 15 March:
  - Hotcha Melody (United States)
  - Stop That Noise (United States)
- 16 March – Mickey's Service Station (United States)
- 21 March – Old Dog Tray (United States)
- 22 March:
  - Pleased to Meet Cha! (United States)
  - The Golden Touch (United States)
- 25 March:
  - Do a Good Deed (United States)
  - Make Believe Revue (United States)
- 30 March:
  - Old Mother Hubbard (United States)
  - The Calico Dragon (United States)
- 5 April – Flying Oil (United States)
- 6 April:
  - Along Flirtation Walk (United States)
  - My Green Fedora (United States)
- 12 April – Graduation Exercises (United States)
- 13 April:
  - Good Little Monkeys (United States)
  - Mickey's Kangaroo (United States)
- 19 April:
  - Peg Leg Pete, The Pirate (United States)
  - Swat the Fly (United States)
- 20 April:
  - Buddy in Africa (United States)
  - The Robber Kitten (United States)
- 26 April:
  - The "Hyp-Nut-Tist" (United States)
  - The Peace Conference (United States)
- 27 April:
  - Mary's Little Lamb (United States)
  - The Chinese Nightingale (United States)
- 29 April – Elmer the Great Dane (United States)
- 3 May - Modern Red Hood (United States)
- 11 May:
  - Poor Little Me (United States)
  - Water Babies (United States)
- 14 May – A Cat, a Mouse and a Bell (United States)
- 17 May – Five Puplets (United States)
- 18 May – Buddy's Lost World (United States)
- 19 May – The Kids in the Shoe (United States)
- 20 May – The King's Jester (United States)
- 24 May:
  - No! No! A Thousand Times No!! (United States)
  - Scrappy's Ghost Story (United States)
- 25 May:
  - Barnyard Babies (United States)
  - The Cookie Carnival (United States)
- 31 May:
  - Choose Your "Weppins" (United States)
  - Opera Night (United States)
- 8 June – Into Your Dance (United States)
- 14 June – King Looney XIV (United States)
- 15 June – Summertime (United States)
- 17 June – Towne Hall Follies (United States)
- 21 June:
  - A Little Soap and Water (United States)
  - The Puppet Murder Case (United States)
- 22 June – Buddy's Bug Hunt (United States)
- 26 June:
  - Little Rover (United States)
  - Who Killed Cock Robin? (United States)
- 28 June:
  - For Better or Worser (United States)
  - Moans and Groans (United States)
- 4 July:
  - The Gummy Sour Kids Factory Year (1950) (United States)
- 12 July:
  - Amateur Night (United States)
  - Dancing on the Moon (United States)
- 13 July:
  - Country Mouse (United States)
  - Mickey's Garden (United States)
- 19 July – A Language All My Own (United States)
- 20 July – Buddy Steps Out (United States)
- 22 July – At Your Service (United States)
- 26 July:
  - Dizzy Divers (United States)
  - Sinbad the Sailor (United States)
  - The Foxy-Fox (United States)
- 28 July – Scrappy's Big Moment (United States)
- 1 August – Garden Gaieties (United States)
- 3 August – Mickey's Fire Brigade (United States)
- 9 August – Chain Letters (United States)
- 16 August – Betty Boop and Grampy (United States)
- 17 August:
  - Neighbors (United States)
  - The Merry Old Soul (United States)
- 19 August – Bronco Buster (United States)
- 23 August – Birdland (United States)
- 24 August – Buddy the Gee Man (United States)
- 29 August – Scrappy's Trailer (United States)
- 30 August – The Three Bears (United States)
- 31 August:
  - Pluto's Judgement Day (United States)
  - You Gotta Be a Football Hero (United States)
- 6 September:
  - A Colour Box (United Kingdom)
  - Circus Days (United States)
  - Time for Love (United States)
- 7 September – The Lady in Red (United States)
- 14 September:
  - A Cartoonist's Nightmare (United States)
  - Monkey Love (United States)
- 20 September:
  - Hey Diddle Diddle (United States)
  - Judge for a Day (United States)
- 21 September – The Old Plantation (United States)
- 23 September – Amateur Broadcast (United States)
- 27 September:
  - A Happy Family (United States)
  - King of the Mardi Gras (United States)
- 28 September – On Ice (United States)
- 30 September – Balloon Land (United States)
- 5 October – Music Land (United States)
- 13 October – The Bon Bon Parade (United States)
- 14 October – Foiled Again (United States)
- 15 October – Football (United States)
- 18 October – Making Stars (United States)
- 19 October:
  - Hollywood Capers (United States)
  - Honeyland (United States)
  - Little Dutch Plate (United States)
- 25 October – Adventures of Popeye (United States)
- 26 October – Three Orphan Kittens (United States)
- 28 October – The Quail Hunt (United States)
- 1 November – A June Bride (United States)
- 2 November – Gold Diggers of '49 (United States)
- 7 November – Let's Ring Doorbells (United States)
- 8 November – Musical Memories (United States)
- 15 November:
  - Aladdin's Lamp (United States)
  - Simple Simon (United States)
- 16 November:
  - Alias St. Nick (United States)
  - Billboard Frolics (United States)
- 18 November – Monkey Wretches (United States)
- 22 November – Henry, the Funniest Living American (United States)
- 29 November – Southern Horse - Pitality (United States)
- 30 November – Cock o' the Walk (United States)
- 2 December – Case of the Lost Sheep (United States)
- 7 December – The Spinach Overture (United States)
- 13 December – Ye Olde Toy Shop (United States)
- 14 December:
  - Broken Toys (United States)
  - Flowers for Madame (United States)
  - Run, Sheep, Run! (United States)
- 18 December – Little Nobody (United States)
- 23 December – Doctor Oswald (United States)
- 27 December:
  - Humpty Dumpty (United States)
  - Kannibal Kapers (United States)
  - The Mayflower (United States)

== Films released ==
- March 25 - The New Gulliver (Soviet Union)

== Births ==
=== January ===
- January 1: Kenji Yoshida, Japanese anime producer, manga artist and illustrator (co-founder of Tatsunoko Production).
- January 6: Nino Tempo, American singer and saxophonist (voice of Black Bart and Luigi in Garfield: His 9 Lives, Herbie in Garfield Goes Hollywood, Monkey in Garfield in Paradise, Lt. Washington in Garfield's Babes and Bullets), (d. 2025).
- January 7: Tommy Johnson, American orchestral tuba player (Walt Disney Animation Studios, All Dogs Go to Heaven, Tom and Jerry: The Movie, Toy Story, Toy Story 2, Antz, Ice Age, Looney Tunes: Back in Action, Mickey, Donald, Goofy: The Three Musketeers, The Ant Bully), (d. 2006).
- January 9: Bob Denver, American actor (voice of Gilligan in The New Adventures of Gilligan and Gilligan's Planet, himself in The Simpsons episode "Simpson Tide"), (d. 2005).
- January 22:
  - Seymour Cassel, American actor (voice of Chuck Sirianni in the Justice League Unlimited episode "I Am Legion", Man in Panda Suit in the Gary the Rat episode "Manratten"), (d. 2019).
  - Valentina Talyzina, Soviet and Russian actress (voice of Uncle Fyodor's mother in Three from Prostokvashino and its sequels), (d. 2025).
- January 27: Vladimir Zuykov, Russian animator and illustrator, (Film, Film, Film, Winnie-the-Pooh, About an Old Man, an Old Woman and Their Hen Ryaba), (d. 2021).

=== February ===
- February 16:
  - Brian Bedford, English actor (voice of the title character in Robin Hood), (d. 2016).
  - Sándor Reisenbüchler, Hungarian film director, animator and graphic artist, (d. 2004).
- February 17: Kurt-Hans Goedicke, German-born English timpanist (An American Tail, An American Tail: Fievel Goes West, Once Upon a Forest, We're Back! A Dinosaur's Story), (d. 2025).
- February 18:
  - Gennady Gladkov, Soviet and Russian composer (Most, Most, Most, Most, The Bremen Town Musicians, The Blue Bird, On the Trail of the Bremen Town Musicians, eighth episode of Well, Just You Wait!, Blue Puppy, Ograblenie po..., Very Blue Beard, The New Bremen Town Musicians), (d. 2023).
  - Vlasta Pospíšilová, Czech animator, screenwriter and director (Jiří Trnka Studio, Pat & Mat, Broučci, Fimfárum), (d. 2022).

=== March ===
- March 11: Michie Kita, Japanese voice actress (voice of Togenishia in Hana no Ko Lunlun, Nobuhiko Obayashi in Don Dracula, Eru in Doraemon: Nobita and the Castle of the Undersea Devil), (d. 2024).
- March 13: Jim Thurman, American actor, writer, director, cartoonist, and producer (Sesame Street, Fat Albert and the Cosby Kids, Muppet Babies), (d. 2007).
- March 22: M. Emmet Walsh, American actor (voice of Earl Stutz in The Iron Giant, Mack in Big Guy and Rusty the Boy Robot, Olaf Hugglesbjork in Pound Puppies, Cosmic Owl in Adventure Time, Gemsbok #1 in The Wild Thornberrys episode "Rain Dance", Jeb in the What's New, Scooby-Doo? episode "A Scooby-Doo! Christmas"), (d. 2024).

=== April ===
- April 4: Kenneth Mars, American actor (voice of King Triton in The Little Mermaid franchise, Tuskernini in Darkwing Duck, Professor Screweyes in We're Back! A Dinosaur's Story, Grandpa Longneck in The Land Before Time franchise, Beethoven in the Animaniacs episode "Roll Over, Beethoven", Dr. Gunter Hunterhanker in the Freakazoid! episode "Candle Jack"), (d. 2011).
- April 9:
  - Avery Schreiber, American actor and comedian (voice of Tubbs in Pound Puppies, Benny the Ball in Top Cat and the Beverly Hills Cats, Beanie the Brain-Dead Bison in Animaniacs), (d. 2002).
  - Motomu Kiyokawa, Japanese voice actor (voice of Kozo Fuyutsuki in Neon Genesis Evangelion and Rebuild of Evangelion, Walter C. Dornez in Hellsing, Tem Ray in Mobile Suit Gundam, Tippy in Is the Order a Rabbit?, Artorius in Restaurant to Another World), (d. 2022).
- April 14: Barbara Frawley, Australian actress (voice of Dot in Dot and the Kangaroo and its sequels), (d. 2004).
- April 18: Jerry Dexter, American actor (voice of Chuck in Shazzan, Alan in Josie and the Pussycats, Ted in Goober and the Ghost Chasers, Aqualad in Aquaman, Sunfire in the Spider-Man and His Amazing Friends episode of the same name), (d. 2013).
- April 19: Dudley Moore, English actor, comedian, musician and composer (voice of George - The Second Border Guard in The Hat, A. Square in Flatland, Spin in Really Wild Animals, Oscar in Oscar's Orchestra, Carl Denham and the title character in The Mighty Kong), (d. 2002).
- April 29: Lennie Weinrib, American voice actor (original voice of Scrappy-Doo, King Leonidas and the secretary bird in Bedknobs and Broomsticks, Hunk in Voltron: Defender of the Universe, Bigmouth in The Smurfs), (d. 2006).

=== May ===
- May 2: Lance LeGault, American actor (voice of Junior the Buffalo in Home on the Range, Yank Justice in Bigfoot and the Muscle Machines, the Chief in Tugger: The Jeep 4x4 Who Wanted to Fly), (d. 2012).
- May 3: Ron Popeil, American inventor and marketing personality (voiced himself in the Futurama episode "A Big Piece of Garbage"), (d. 2021).
- May 8: Prescott Wright, American film distributor and animation producer (founder of the Ottawa International Animation Festival, produced the International Tournée of Animation, creative staffing specialist of Disney's Feature Division), (d. 2006).
- May 15:
  - Burny Mattinson, American writer, director, and animator (Walt Disney Animation Studios), (d. 2023).
  - Akihiro Miwa, Japanese singer and actor (voice of Arceus in Pokémon: Arceus and the Jewel of Life, Witch of the Waste in Howl's Moving Castle, Moro-no-kimi in Princess Mononoke), (d. 2026).
  - Radna Sakhaltuev, Ukrainian animator (Adventures of Captain Wrongel, Treasure Island, Cossacks), (d. 2025).
- May 18: Allan Burns, American television producer and writer (Jay Ward Productions), (d. 2021).
- May 27: Lee Meriwether, American actress (voice of Lucilee Diamond in Batman vs. Two-Face, Widow Liebner in the Duckman episode "Pig Amok").
- May 28: Anne Reid, English actress (voice of Wendolene in A Close Shave).
- May 30: Lee Gunther, American film editor (co-founder of Marvel Productions), (d. 1998).

=== June ===
- June 3: Irma P. Hall, American actress (voice of Aunt T. in the Rugrats episode "A Rugrats Kwanzaa"), (d. 2026).
- June 9: Peter Renaday, American actor (voice of Splinter in Teenage Mutant Ninja Turtles, Sir George in Ben 10: Ultimate Alien, Abraham Lincoln in Animaniacs and Evil Con Carne, Uncle Sam in the Batman: The Brave and the Bold episode "Cry Freedom Fighters!", Howard Stark in the Iron Man episode "Not Far from the Tree"), (d. 2024).
- June 12: Joe Mazzuca, American television producer (Filmation, Marvel Productions, Hanna-Barbera), (d. 2002).
- June 15: Doug Crane, American comics artist and animator (Terrytoons, Hanna-Barbera, Filmation, Spider-Man, Heavy Metal, Beavis and Butt-Head), (d. 2020).
- June 22: Floyd Norman, American comic book artist, animator (Walt Disney Animation Studios, Hanna-Barbera, It's Punky Brewster, Alvin and the Chipmunks, Cats Don't Dance), storyboard artist (Hanna-Barbera, DIC Entertainment, Garfield and Friends, Mother Goose and Grimm, Mickey's Once Upon a Christmas, Toy Story 2, The Tigger Movie, Monsters, Inc., Courage the Cowardly Dog, Disneytoon Studios, Click and Clack's As the Wrench Turns, The High Fructose Adventures of Annoying Orange, Free Birds, Robot Chicken) and writer (The Real Ghostbusters, The Hunchback of Notre Dame, Mulan).

=== July ===
- July 13: Paul Hüttel, Danish actor (voice of Agra in Strings, Danish dub voice of Grimsby in The Little Mermaid and Mr. Ping in the Kung Fu Panda franchise), (d. 2025).
- July 15: Campbell Lane, Canadian actor (voice of Skeletor in The New Adventures of He-Man, Narrator in Gundam Wing, Mastermind in X-Men: Evolution, Rampage in Beast Wars: Transformers, Mr. Clancy in G.I. Joe Extreme, Baloo in Adventures of Mowgli, Elder Kulatak in the He-Man and the Masters of the Universe episode "Trust"), (d. 2014).
- July 17: Donald Sutherland, Canadian actor (voice of Dr. Sid in Final Fantasy: The Spirits Within, President Stone in Astro Boy, Narrator in The Poky Little Puppy's First Christmas, Narrator and Sir Henry Fitzpatrick in Jock the Hero Dog, Charles Johnson in Pirate's Passage, Albino Crocodile in Ozi: Voice of the Forest, Clumsy Waiter in the Sunday Pants segment "The Hall of Presidents", Holllis Hurlbut in The Simpsons episode "Lisa the Iconoclast"), (d. 2024).
- July 19: Vasily Livanov, Soviet and Russian actor and animation director (Soyuzmultfilm).
- July 22: Stanley Ralph Ross, American writer (Wait Till Your Father Gets Home, G.I. Joe: A Real American Hero), and actor (voice of Gorilla Grodd and Brainiac in Super Friends), (d. 2000).
- July 25: István Pathó, Hungarian actor (voice of Bank Executive in Cat City, Mump in The Princess and the Goblin), (d. 2024).
- July 29: Joan Gerber, American actress (voice of Granny in Corn on the Cop, Irma Boyle in Wait Till Your Father Gets Home, The Elephant in The Mouse and His Child, Mrs. Rich and Irona the Maid in Richie Rich, Mrs. Kelp in Snorks, Mrs. Beakley and Glittering Goldie in DuckTales, Gotcha Grabmore in Tiny Toon Adventures, Shreeka in the Teenage Mutant Ninja Turtles episode "Shreeka's Revenge"), (d. 2011).
- July 30: Nick Meglin, American comics writer, theater lyricist and animation scriptwriter (Batfink, The Pink Panther), (d. 2018).

=== August ===
- August 8: John Laws, Australian radio and television presenter (voice of Rumpus Bumpus in The Magic Pudding), (d. 2025).
- August 9: Kazuko Yoshiyuki, Japanese actress (voice of Toki in Ponyo, Nanny in Where Marnie Was There), (d. 2025).
- August 21: Yuri Entin, Russian and Soviet poet, playwright, and lyricist (The Bremen Town Musicians, Blue Puppy).
- August 29: William Friedkin, American film director (voice of Dr. Kenneth Humphries in The Simpsons episode "Treehouse of Horror XXVIII"), (d. 2023).

=== September ===
- September 5: Lucille Soong, Chinese-American actress (voice of Dang Hu in Raya and the Last Dragon).
- September 9: Michiko Hirai, Japanese voice actress (voice of the title character in Sally the Witch, Starsha in Star Blazers), (d. 1984).
- September 10: Paul van Vliet, Dutch comedian, actor and singer (voice of King Radboud in Alfred J. Kwak), (d. 2023).
- September 14: Henry Gibson, American actor (voice of Wilbur in Charlotte's Web, Eleroo in The Wuzzles, Dr. Applecheek in Tom and Jerry: The Movie, Lord Pain in The Grim Adventures of Billy & Mandy), (d. 2009).
- September 16: Jules Bass, American director, producer, composer, lyricist and author (co-founder of Rankin/Bass), (d. 2022).
- September 18: Román Arámbula, Mexican comic book artist, animator (Hanna-Barbera), storyboard artist (Tubby the Tuba, TaleSpin, Little Shop, Attack of the Killer Tomatoes, Madeline, Warner Bros. Animation, Problem Child, 101 Dalmatians: The Series) and sheet timer (King of the Hill), (d. 2020).
- September 24: Sean McCann, Canadian actor (voice of Grandfather Bear in Little Bear, Mr. Kravitz in the Rescue Heroes episode "On Thin Ice", Russell Copeland in George Shrinks), (d. 2019).
- September 26: Cullen Blaine, American animator (Hanna-Barbera, Alvin and the Chipmunks, Denver, the Last Dinosaur, The Simpsons, Garfield and Friends, Nine Dog Christmas), storyboard artist (Hanna-Barbera. Ruby-Spears Enterprises, Marvel Productions, DIC Entertainment, Ghostbusters, The Berenstain Bears, Spiral Zone, Garfield and Friends, Teenage Mutant Ninja Turtles, Calico Entertainment, Animaniacs, Timon & Pumbaa, Hey Arnold!, The Magic School Bus, God, the Devil and Bob, Grandma Got Run Over by a Reindeer, Globehunters: An Around the World in 80 Days Adventure, Make Way for Noddy, Barbie: Fairytopia, Arthur's Missing Pal, Higglytown Heroes), sheet timer (Warner Bros. Animation, DIC Entertainment, Jetlag Productions, Life with Louie, Happily Ever After: Fairy Tales for Every Child, Disney Television Animation, Jumanji, Toonsylvania, Silver Surfer, Dora the Explorer, All Grown Up!, Tutenstein, The Secret Saturdays, G.I. Joe: Renegades), writer (The Pink Panther Show), producer (The Get Along Gang) and director (Return to the Planet of the Apes, DIC Entertainment, Garfield and Friends, Hey Arnold!, Disney Television Animation, Kid Notorious), (d. 2020).

=== October ===
- October 1: Julie Andrews, English actress and singer (portrayed the title character in Mary Poppins, voice of Princess Zeila in The Singing Princess, Queen Lillian in the Shrek franchise, Marlena in the Despicable Me franchise, narrator in Enchanted).
- October 2: Noriko Ohara, Japanese voice actress (voice of Nobita in the Doraemon franchise, Peter in Heidi, Girl of the Alps, Majyo in Time Bokan, Narrator in The Rose of Versailles, Supreme Commander Teral in Space Emperor God Sigma, Oyuki in the Urusei Yatsura franchise, Japanese dub voice of Miss Bianca in The Rescuers, Valerie Brown in Josie and the Pussycats, Penelope Pitstop in Wacky Races and The Perils of Penelope Pitstop), (d. 2024).
- October 10: Judith Chalmers, English television presenter (voice of Judith Poodle in Rex the Runt), (d. 2026).
- October 20: Jerry Orbach, American actor (voice of Lumière in Beauty and the Beast), (d. 2004).
- October 24: Carlos Becerril, Mexican voice actor (Latin American dub voice of Fancy-Fancy in Top Cat, Chick Hicks in the Cars franchise), (d. 2026).
- October 26: Renato Casaro, Italian film poster artist (The Care Bears Movie) and title designer (Asterix and the Big Fight), (d. 2025).
- October 29: Isao Takahata, Japanese animator, film director and producer (Grave of the Fireflies, The Tale of the Princess Kaguya), (d. 2018).
- October 31: Thomas Warkentin, American comics artist, comics writer and animator (Filmation, Warner Bros. Animation), (d. 2003).

=== November ===
- November 7: Lubomír Beneš, Czech animator and director (co-creator of Pat & Mat), (d. 1995).
- November 30: Woody Allen, American film director, writer, actor, and comedian (voice of Z Marion-4195 "Z" in Antz).

=== December ===
- December 3: Shelly Desai, American actor (voice of Crenshaw in the Archer episode "Mole Hunt"), (d. 2026).
- December 9: Beverly Hope Atkinson, American actress (voice of Carol in Heavy Traffic), (d. 2001).
- December 14:
  - Barbara Leigh-Hunt, English actress (voice of Helena in A Midsummer Night's Dream, Captain Mildred and Mary the Hover Fairy in Charlie Chalk, Farmer's Wife in The Plague Dogs), (d. 2024).
  - Lewis Arquette, American actor (voice of Dr. Onishi in the Streamline Pictures dub of Akira, Jimmy Snuka in Hulk Hogan's Rock 'n' Wrestling, Rex DeForest III in Camp Candy, Bombastic Bobby in the Yo Yogi! episode "Yo, Yogi", Abner Doolittle in the SWAT Kats: The Radical Squadron episode "The Ghost Pilot", Principal Gregory Grumm in Daisy-Head Mayzie, Mr. Cilla in As Told by Ginger), (d. 2001).
- December 28: William H. Bassett, American actor (voice of Counterfeiter and Whispering Councilman in the Manga Video dub of The Castle of Cagliostro, Principal in the 2001 dub of Akira, Magician in Catnapped, Elder in Appleseed, Chief Cabinet Secretary Takakura in Ghost in the Shell: Stand Alone Complex, Swampmonster in Avatar: The Last Airbender, Toba Islander in the Mermaid Forest episode "Togyo no sato part 2", Frog in the Cowboy Bebop episode "Mushroom Samba" Yuri Hussler in the Mobile Suit Gundam 0083: Stardust Memory episode "A Storm Raging Through", provided additional voices for Ah! My Goddess: The Movie), (d. 2025).
- December 30: Jack Riley, American actor (voice of Stu Pickles in Rugrats), (d. 2016).

=== Specific date unknown ===
- Fernando Krahn, Chilean artist, comics artist, illustrator and animator (El Crimen Perfecto), (d. 2010).

== Deaths ==
=== October ===
- October 20: Sidney Smith, American cartoonist (created an animated film series adapting his own comic strip Old Doc Yak, credited as the first animated series with a recurring character; created the popular comic strip The Gumps, which was adapted into a film series combining live-action and animation), dies at age 58.
