= Goedicke =

Goedicke, also spelled Gödicke, is a surname of German origin. Notable people with the name include:

- Alexander Goedicke (1877–1957), Russian and Soviet composer and pianist
- Fritz Gödicke (1919–2009), East German footballer and manager
- Kurt-Hans Goedicke (born 1935), German-born English timpanist
- Oliver Goedicke, German DJ and musician
- Patricia Goedicke (1931–2006), American poet
- Stefan Gödicke (born 1970), Swedish actor
- Wolfgang Gödicke (born 1934), German modern pentathlete
