= Be Human (film) =

1936 American film

- Directed by: Dave Fleischer
- Produced by: Max Fleischer
- Starring: Mae Questel (Betty Boop); Everett Clark (Grampy); Gus Wickie (Abusive Farmer); Jack Mercer (Horse, Pig)
- Music by: Sammy Timberg
- Animation by: Lillian Friedman; Myron Waldman
- Color process: Black-and-white
- Production company: Fleischer Studios
- Distributed by: Paramount Pictures
- Release date: November 20, 1936
- Running time: 6 minutes
- Country: United States
- Language: English

Be Human is a 1936 American animated short film starring Betty Boop and Grampy. It is now in the public domain.

== Plot ==
Betty Boop is incensed at her farmer neighbor's cruelty to his animals. But the inventive Grampy knows how to teach him a lesson.

The abusive farmer has been compared to Billy Joe Gregg, who abused numerous cows and calves at the Conklin Dairy Farms in Ohio in 2010.

== Song ==
The cartoon features the song Be Human sung by Betty Boop accompanying herself on piano. Instrumental renditions of the song are also prominent throughout the cartoon. When the animal-abusing farmer winds up on Grampy's punishment treadmill, a phonograph recording of Grampy's voice is heard singing the song.

== See also ==
- Cruelty to animals
- Animal welfare
- Vigilantism
- A Song a Day - The animated short with Betty Boop and Grampy in a humane animal hospital
- Animal rights
