= Betty Boop and the Little King =

1936 film

- Directed by: Dave Fleischer
- Story by: Otto Soglow (as O. Soglow); William Gilmartin (unc.); Jack Ward (unc.)
- Produced by: Max Fleischer
- Starring: Mae Questel; Jack Mercer
- Animation by: Hicks Lokey; Myron Waldman; Lillian Friedman (unc.); Herman Cohen (unc.); Sam Stimson (unc.); Frank Andres (unc.); Ted Vosk (unc.)
- Color process: Black-and-white
- Production company: Fleischer Studios
- Distributed by: Paramount Pictures
- Release date: January 31, 1936
- Running time: 7 minutes
- Country: United States
- Language: English

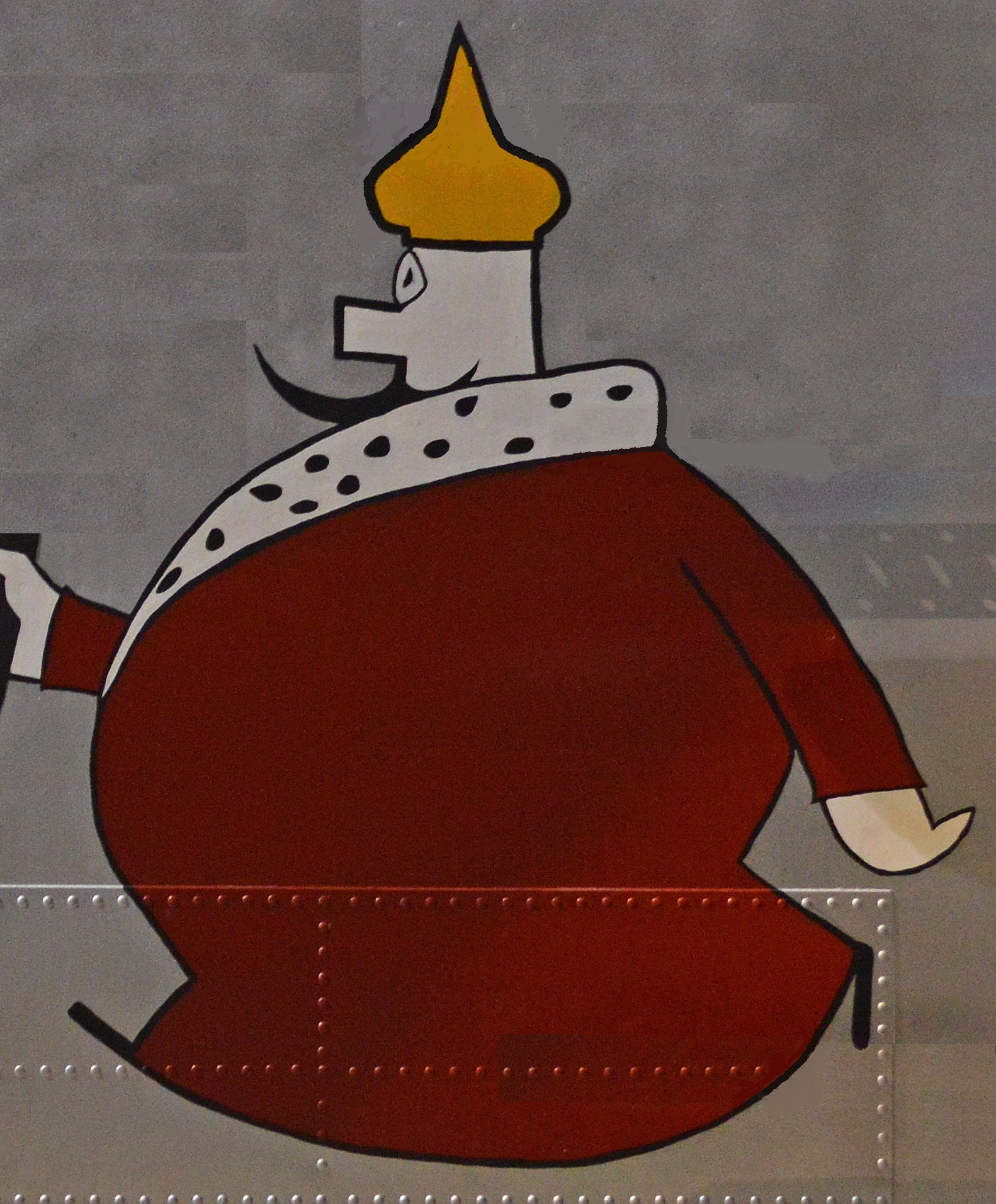
Nose art on B-25J Mitchell 44-86872, c/n 108-47626. On display in the WW2 Hangar at Warner Robins Museum of Aviation. Georgia, USA. April 18, 2013

Betty Boop and the Little King is a 1936 Fleischer Studio animated short film, starring Betty Boop and featuring Otto Soglow's Little King.

== Plot ==
A special opera performance is held for the Little King and his queen, but the diminutive monarch is soon bored by the music. He sneaks out in search of some new entertainment, and spots a sign for Betty Boop at the local vaudeville theatre. After some difficulties getting a pretzel from a vendor, the curtain comes up on Betty's Wild West show. Betty performs several tricks with her horse, entrancing the monarch. He joins Betty on stage for a song and dance number, just in time to be caught by the angry queen. The monarchs leave in the royal carriage, with Betty (hiding on the fender) holding the Little King's hand.

== Production notes ==
The Little King had appeared in several cartoons produced by Van Beuren Studios (1933–34). In those cartoons, he was silent (as he had been in his comic strip). This short is the second film with the Little King speaking, with the first being "Marching Along" of the Van Buren Studios era.

== See also ==
- Popeye the Sailor (film)
- Betty Boop with Henry, the Funniest Living American
- Betty Boop and Little Jimmy
