= The Candid Candidate =

- Directed by: Dave Fleischer
- Produced by: Max Fleischer
- Starring: Mae Questel (Betty Boop); Everett Clark (Grampy); Jack Mercer (additional voices)
- Music by: Sammy Timberg
- Animation by: Lillian Friedman; Myron Waldman
- Color process: Black-and-white
- Production company: Fleischer Studios
- Distributed by: Paramount Pictures
- Release date: August 27, 1937
- Running time: 7 minutes
- Country: United States
- Language: English

The Candid Candidate is a 1937 Fleischer Studios animated short film starring Betty Boop and Grampy.

== Synopsis ==
Betty Boop campaigns for Grampy for Mayor, and wins by one vote (despite the fact the town's paper says it's a landslide). However, he later finds out the job isn't as glamorous as he thought. Nonetheless, he helps solve some of the city's issues, such as building a free bridge on the river, creating a public automatic root beer stand, etc., and the townspeople love him.
