= Pudgy and the Lost Kitten =

- Directed by: Dave Fleischer
- Starring: Kate Whight; Jack Mecer
- Animation by: Myron Waldman; Lillian Friedman
- Color process: Black-and-white
- Production company: Fleischer Studios
- Distributed by: Paramount Pictures
- Release date: June 24, 1938
- Running time: 7 mins
- Language: English

Pudgy and the Lost Kitten is a 1938 Fleischer Studios animated short film starring Betty Boop.

== Synopsis ==
Myron the kitten and his mother, from a previous Betty Boop cartoon called Happy You and Merry Me make a return appearance.
