= Betty Boop's Prize Show =

- Directed by: Dave Fleischer
- Produced by: Max Fleischer
- Starring: Mae Questel
- Animation by: Lillian Friedman; Myron Waldman
- Color process: Black-and-white
- Production company: Fleischer Studios
- Distributed by: Paramount Pictures
- Release date: October 19, 1934
- Running time: 7 minutes
- Country: United States
- Language: English

Betty Boop's Prize Show is a 1934 Fleischer Studios animated short film starring Betty Boop.

This is the second of a series of Betty Boop melodrama spoofs, which also included She Wronged Him Right (1934), No! No! A Thousand Times No!! (1935) and Honest Love and True (1938).

== Plot ==
Betty and her boyfriend, Freddy, are appearing on stage at the Slumberland Theatre. Betty is the school marm in an old style melodrama, and Freddy is the dashing hero, who rescues her from the clutches of Philip the Fiend.
