= The Impractical Joker =

- Directed by: Dave Fleischer
- Produced by: Max Fleischer
- Starring: Mae Questel (Betty Boop); Everett Clark (Grampy); Jack Mercer (Irving)
- Music by: Sammy Timberg
- Animation by: Frank Endres; Thomas Johnson
- Color process: Black-and-white
- Production company: Fleischer Studios
- Distributed by: Paramount Pictures
- Release date: June 18, 1937
- Running time: 6 minutes
- Country: United States
- Language: English

The Impractical Joker is a 1937 Fleischer Studios animated short film starring Betty Boop. Jack Mercer (the voice of Popeye) provides the voice for Irving.

== Synopsis ==
Betty Boop is baking a cake, when Irving the practical joker comes for a visit. Betty becomes the victim of such pranks as shaking a false hand and getting squirted in the face. Betty calls on Grampy for help, and he quickly rigs his apartment to counteract Irving's pranks and send him on his way. Irving gets the last laugh, when Grampy lights the candle on the cake. Irving replaced the candle with a firecracker before he left. That last laugh is short-lived, however, when the picture of a warship that Irving is standing next to shoots water at him continuously.

== In other media ==
A short clip from this cartoon can be seen in the opening credits of the Futurama episode "My Three Suns".

Some clips of the redrawn colorized version were used in the compilation Betty Boop For President: The Movie (1980).

This episode re-uses the same animation of Betty Boop losing her temper from House Cleaning Blues, which also features Grampy as a supporting character.
