= Grampy's Indoor Outing =

- Directed by: Dave Fleischer
- Produced by: Max Fleischer
- Starring: Mae Questel (Betty Boop); Margie Hines (Junior); Everett Clark (Grampy)
- Music by: Sammy Timberg
- Animation by: David Tendlar; William Sturm
- Color process: Black-and-white
- Production company: Fleischer Studios
- Distributed by: Paramount Pictures
- Release date: October 16, 1936
- Running time: 7 minutes
- Country: United States
- Language: English

Grampy's Indoor Outing is a 1936 Fleischer Studios animated short, starring Betty Boop and Grampy.

== Synopsis ==
Betty offers to take her nephew Junior to see the carnival. Before they can leave the house, it starts to thunder and rain, making it impossible to attend the carnival. Betty's upstairs neighbor Grampy saves the day by using his crazy inventions to turn the apartment (and eventually, even the whole house with a huge umbrella covering it) into a circus.
