= She Wronged Him Right =

- Directed by: Dave Fleischer; Roland Crandall (animation)
- Produced by: Max Fleischer
- Starring: Bonnie Poe (Betty Boop - voice)
- Music by: Herman Hupfeld (song "Let's Put Out the Lights (and Go to Sleep)")
- Animation by: Roland Crandall; Thomas Johnson
- Color process: Black and white
- Production company: Fleischer Studios
- Distributed by: Paramount Pictures
- Release date: January 5, 1934
- Running time: 7 minutes
- Country: United States
- Language: English

She Wronged Him Right is a 1934 Fleischer Studios animated short film starring Betty Boop. It marks the first appearance of Betty's semi-regular boyfriend, Fearless Fred.

This is the first of a series of Betty Boop melodrama spoofs, which also included Betty Boop's Prize Show (1934), No! No! A Thousand Times No!! (1935) and Honest Love and True (1938). The series was apparently inspired by the Terrytoons series of Fanny Zilch cartoons.

== Plot ==
Betty Boop appears in a stage play, complete with obvious theatrical backdrops. Betty doesn't have the money to pay the mortgage, so the dastardly villain Heeza Rat threatens to foreclose unless Betty agrees to marry him. The villain threatens Betty in various ways, even almost drowning her until the handsome and muscular Fearless Fred comes to her rescue.
