= The New Deal Show =

- Directed by: Dave Fleischer
- Produced by: Max Fleischer
- Starring: Mae Questel
- Animation by: Lillian Friedman; Hicks Lokey
- Color process: Black-and-white
- Production company: Fleischer Studios
- Distributed by: Paramount Pictures
- Release date: October 22, 1937
- Running time: 7 mins
- Language: English

The New Deal Show is a 1937 Fleischer Studios animated short film starring Betty Boop.

== Synopsis ==
Betty Boop produces a pet show in which the pets use unusual devices to assist them in their normal behavior. Some ideas copied from Betty Boop's Crazy Inventions (1933).
