= Kurochka Ryaba =

Eastern Slavic folk tale

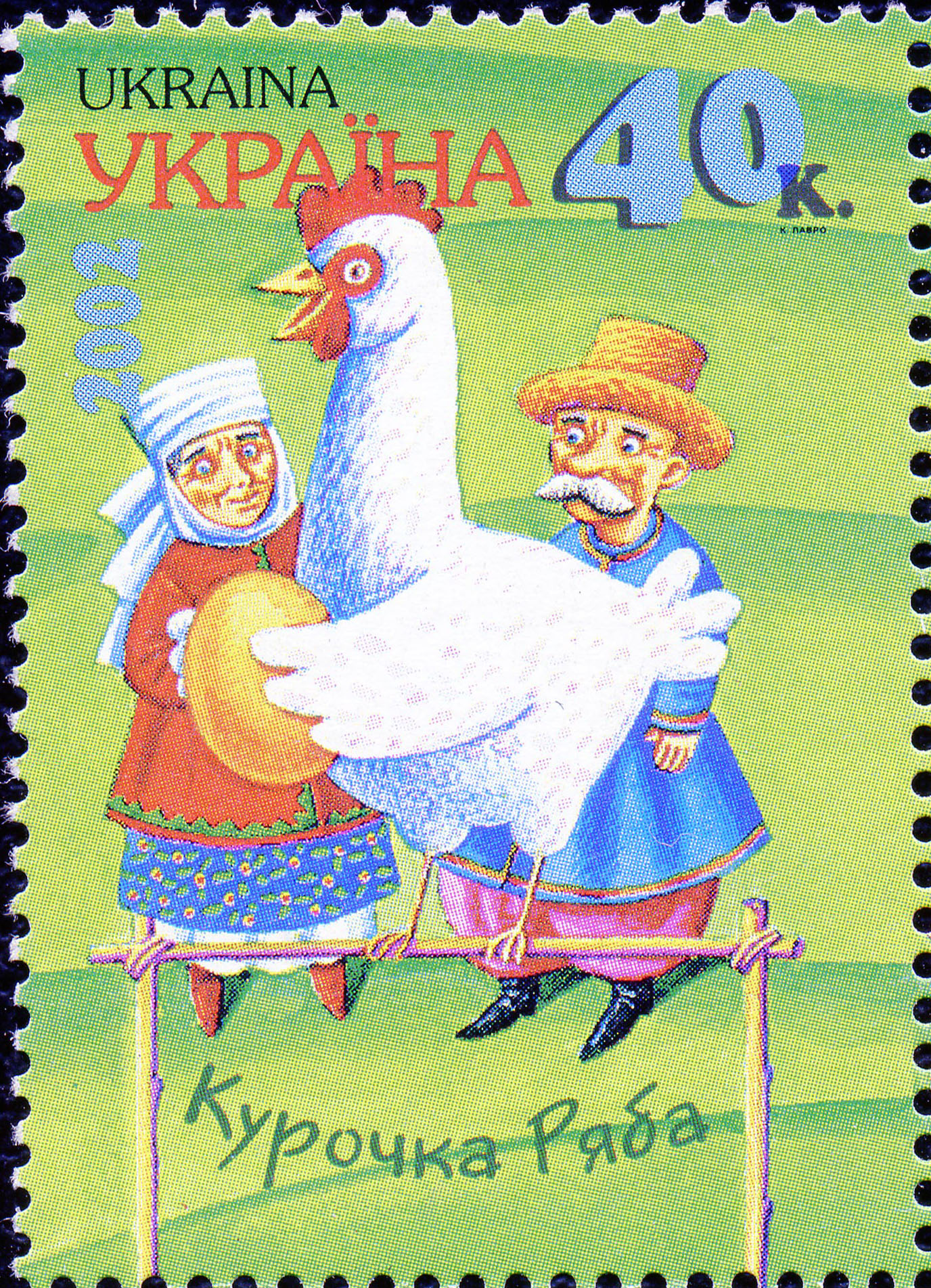
Postage stamp featuring "Kurochka Ryaba", Ukrainian national postal service, Ukrposhta, 2002

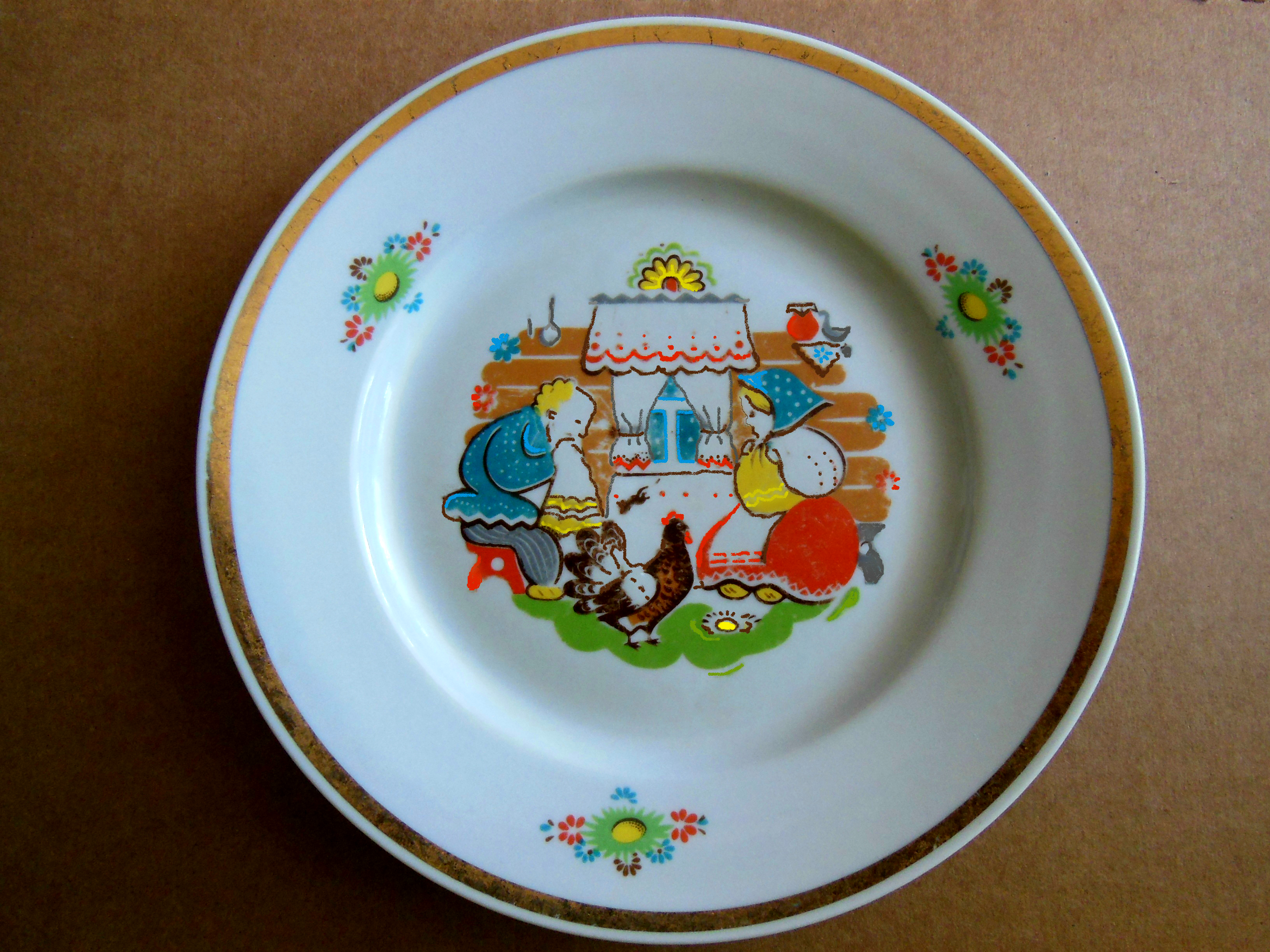
A plate depicting a speckled hen

"Kurochka Ryaba" (Russian: «Курочка Ряба»,Ukrainian: «Курочка Ряба», lit. 'Ryaba the hen') is an Eastern Slavic folk tale of Ukraine and Russia.

== Plot ==
There lived an old man and an old woman, and they had a hen named Ryaba. One day, the hen laid an egg. It was not a simple egg, but a golden one.

The old man tried to crack it, but could not. The old woman tried to crack it, but could not.

A mouse ran by. With a mere sway of the mouse's tail, the egg fell, hit the floor and cracked.

The old man cried. The old woman cried.

"Don't cry", said Ryaba the hen, "I'll lay you a new egg, not a golden egg, but a simple one".

== Interpretation ==
Professor of Russian at Williams College, Darra Goldstein, interpreted the story's meaning for children as teaching children to "value what is simple and real in life, for those are the things that nourish and sustain us, rather than riches we haven't earned, which can disappear as suddenly as they appear."

== In popular culture ==
=== Stamps ===
- Kurochka Ryaba was featured in a 2002 stamp series of the Ukrainian national postal service, Ukrposhta.

=== Films based on the tale ===
- A 1982 film by Moscow's Soyuzmultfilm entitled About an Old Man, an Old Woman and Their Hen Ryaba
- A 1994 Russian-French comedy film referencing the folk tale entitled, Assia and the Hen with the Golden Eggs.

=== Statues ===
- A statue in Kazka park in Sumy, Ukraine.

=== Other ===
- A hotel in Krasnodar, Russia.

== See also ==
- Ukrainian fairy tale
- Russian fairy tale
