= Grampy =

Animated cartoon character

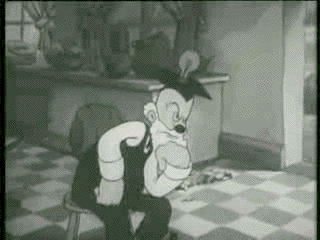
Grampy and his "thinking cap", in a scene from the Betty Boop cartoon House Cleaning Blues (1937).

Professor Grampy is an animated cartoon character appearing in the Betty Boop series of shorts produced by Max Fleischer and released by Paramount Pictures. He appeared in nine of the later Betty Boop cartoons beginning with Betty Boop and Grampy (1935). He had a starring role in the "Color Classic" Christmas Comes But Once a Year (1936).

Grampy is an ever-cheerful, energetic senior citizen with a bald, dome-shaped head, a white beard and a black (depicted as red in color productions) nose. One author speculates that the character's design may suggest he is Koko the Clown in retirement. His primary activities include singing, dancing and building Rube Goldberg-esque devices out of ordinary household items. When presented with an unexpected problem, he puts on his thinking cap (a mortarboard with a lightbulb on top). In short order, the lightbulb lights up as Grampy exclaims, "Hooray, I've got it!" and builds a new gadget to solve the problem. The character was possibly based upon Max's brother, Charles, an inventor, one of whose creations was the clawing device that, as of 2026, is still omnipresent in arcades and standalone toys.

It is not clear whether Grampy is actually related to Betty Boop, because everyone calls him "Grampy" and he seems to be equally affectionate to almost everyone he meets. There is also some inconsistency as to living arrangements. In some cartoons like Betty Boop and Grampy and House Cleaning Blues, he and Betty live in separate houses. However, in The Impractical Joker, he lives in an upper floor.

The identity of Grampy's voice actor has been subject to debate. The Fleischer Studios credits Popeye voice actor Jack Mercer, while the character's article on Don Markstein's Toonopedia indicated that standard reference sources didn't name Grampy's voice actor, aside from some isolated mentions crediting Everett Clark for the role.

Grampy appeared in nine of the later Betty Boop cartoons in the mid-1930s, often having a larger role than Betty. He also made one appearance without Betty, in the aforementioned Christmas Comes But Once a Year.

== Filmography ==
Grampy's first appearance in the 1935 Betty Boop cartoon "Betty Boop And Grampy"

- Betty Boop and Grampy (1935)
- A Song a Day (1936)
- Grampy's Indoor Outing (1936)
- Be Human (1936)
- Christmas Comes But Once a Year (1936)
- House Cleaning Blues (1937)
- The Impractical Joker (1937)
- The Candid Candidate (1937)
- Service with a Smile (1937)
- Zula Hula (1937)
