= No! No! A Thousand Times No!! =

- Directed by: Dave Fleischer
- Story by: William Turner; Jack Ward; Thomas Johnson; (all uncredited)
- Produced by: Max Fleischer
- Starring: Mae Questel
- Animation by: Edward Nolan; Myron Waldman; Hicks Lokey (unc.); Lillian Friedman (unc.); Herman Cohen (unc.); Paul Fennell (unc.)
- Color process: Black-and-white
- Production company: Fleischer Studios
- Distributed by: Paramount Pictures
- Release date: May 24, 1935
- Running time: 7 minutes
- Language: English

No! No! A Thousand Times No!! is a 1935 Fleischer Studio animated short film, starring Betty Boop.

This is the third of a series of Betty Boop melodrama spoofs, which also included She Wronged Him Right (1934), Betty Boop's Prize Show (1935) and Honest Love and True (1938). It has sequences reminiscent of the 1934 Merrie Melodies short Those Were Wonderful Days.

== Synopsis ==
Betty is performing on-stage with her boyfriend, Freddy, in an old-fashioned melodrama, complete with a mustachioed villain, Phillip the Fiend. The vile fellow, after tying up the hero, tempts Betty with diamonds and fur, but she replies by singing the title song. Phillip kidnaps Betty and escapes in his balloon, but is eventually caught by Freddy and forced to release Betty.

== Song ==
The title song was written by Al Sherman, Al Lewis, Abner Silver in 1934, and sung by Mae Questel. The song was covered by Percival Mackey and his Orchestra featuring a vocal by Bobbie Comber in October of the same year. It was again covered in the 1960s by Beatrice Kay.
