= Service with a Smile (1937 film) =

- Directed by: Dave Fleischer
- Produced by: Max Fleischer
- Starring: Mae Questel (Betty Boop); Everett Clark (Grampy); Jack Mercer (Guests)
- Music by: Sammy Timberg
- Animation by: David Tendlar; William Sturm
- Color process: Black-and-white
- Production company: Fleischer Studios
- Distributed by: Paramount Pictures
- Release date: September 23, 1937
- Running time: 7 minutes
- Language: English

Service with a Smile is a 1937 Fleischer Studios animated short film starring Betty Boop and Grampy.

== Plot ==
Betty Boop runs the newly opened Hi-De-Ho-Tel, which has 40 rooms and only two baths. Guests have many complaints, ranging from a drawer shelf nailed into the wall apart from the rest of the drawer to pillowcases filled with cement bags and faulty beds with very short blankets. When they stress Betty out, she calls Grampy, who remedies the guests' complaints by making several complex contraptions.
