= Betty Boop with Henry, the Funniest Living American =

- Directed by: Dave Fleischer
- Story by: Dave Fleischer; Izzy Sparber (all uncredited)
- Produced by: Max Fleischer
- Starring: Mae Questel; Ann Rothschild
- Animation by: Sam Stimson; Myron Waldman; Hicks Lokey (unc.); Lillian Friedman (unc.); Herman Cohen (unc.); Frank Andres (unc.); Ted Vosk (unc.)
- Color process: Black-and-white
- Production company: Fleischer Studios
- Distributed by: Paramount Pictures
- Release date: November 22, 1935
- Running time: 7 minutes
- Country: United States
- Language: English

Betty Boop with Henry, the Funniest Living American is a 1935 Fleischer Studios animated short film starring Betty Boop, and featuring Carl Anderson's Henry. The short was also released as Betty Boop with Henry.

== Plot ==
Betty runs the local pet store. Silent Henry wants to buy a puppy, but only has two cents. Soft-hearted Betty offers to let Henry work off the difference at her store. She soon regrets this decision after Henry causes a ruckus trying to manage the pets. In the end, Henry recaptures some escaped birds (by letting them eat seeds off his head), and Betty rewards him with the puppy he wanted.

== Notes and comments ==
The Henry comic strip debuted in 1932, and still runs in some papers. This short was Henry's sole animated appearance.

Betty sings "Everybody Ought to Have a Pet."

== See also ==
- Popeye the Sailor (film)
- Betty Boop and the Little King
- Betty Boop and Little Jimmy
