= Zula Hula =

- Directed by: Dave Fleischer
- Produced by: Max Fleischer; Isadore Sparber; Sam Buchwald
- Starring: Mae Questel (Betty Boop); Everett Clark (Grampy); Jack Mercer (additional voices)
- Music by: Sammy Timberg
- Animation by: Thomas Johnson; Frank Endres
- Color process: Black-and-white
- Production company: Fleischer Studios
- Distributed by: Paramount Pictures
- Release date: December 24, 1937
- Running time: 6 minutes
- Country: United States
- Language: English

Zula Hula is a 1937 Fleischer Studios animated short film starring Betty Boop, and featuring Grampy.

== Synopsis ==
Betty and Grampy are on an around-the-world flight when they are forced to crash-land on an apparently deserted island. Betty is upset with their situation, but Grampy quickly invents a number of gadgets that allow them all the comforts of home. Things again take a turn for the worse when a group of cannibals show up. Quick thinking Grampy charms the savages by creating a calliope out of the crashed plane's parts. While the natives are distracted by the music, Grampy and Betty repair their plane and make a hasty escape.

== Reception ==
Motion Picture Herald said on January 15, 1938, "The whole of the business is detailed in an amusing and rapidly drawn vein of clever cartooning. Similarly, on January 29, Boxoffice described the short as "another one of those sheer wacky cartoons that gather a fair share of laughs."

Retrospective examinations of the episode note its negative racial stereotypes.
