= Honest Love and True =

- Directed by: Dave Fleischer
- Animation by: Myron Waldman; Lillian Friedman
- Color process: Black-and-white
- Production company: Fleischer Studios
- Distributed by: Paramount Pictures
- Release date: March 25, 1938
- Running time: 7 mins
- Language: English

Honest Love and True is a 1938 Fleischer Studios animated short film starring Betty Boop, a Snidely Whiplash-style villain, and another character playing a Canadian Mountie.

This is the last in a series of Betty Boop melodrama spoofs, which also included She Wronged Him Right (1934), Betty Boop's Prize Show (1934) and No! No! A Thousand Times No!! (1935).

== Plot ==
The plotline features Betty as a poor woman who became a singer in a Klondike saloon to avoid starvation, at the behest of her "rat" employer. Her song is lyrically about longing for a man to take her away from trouble, and then a Mountie comes by and feels allured by her song. The play then goes with Betty's employer pinning the Mountie to a wall and activating a buzz saw death trap, while escaping with Betty to a remote cabin. The Mountie escapes and chases after them, captures the villain, and the play ends.
