= Betty Boop and Little Jimmy =

1936 film

- Directed by: Dave Fleischer
- Produced by: Max Fleischer
- Starring: Mae Questel
- Music by: Sammy Timberg (uncredited)
- Animation by: Hicks Lokey; Myron Waldman
- Color process: Black-and-white
- Production company: Fleischer Studios
- Distributed by: Paramount Pictures
- Release date: March 27, 1936
- Running time: 6 mins
- Language: English

Betty Boop and Little Jimmy is a 1936 Fleischer Studio animated short film, starring Betty Boop and featuring newspaper comic strip character Jimmy Swinnerton's Little Jimmy.

== Plot ==
Betty Boop and Little Jimmy are working out in an attic equipped with 1930s vintage exercise equipment. Betty sings the song "Keep Your Girlish Figure" and Little Jimmy responds with a verse "If you're thin, don't worry over that. Just begin to laugh and you'll grow fat".

Betty starts using a belt exercise machine, but gets into trouble when its control gets stuck. She sends Little Jimmy to get an electrician, but along the way he gets distracted and the object of his search keeps changing – magician, politician, musician etc. Finally, he comes across an old spring mattress. He pulls out the springs, placing them on his feet, and goes bouncing all through the neighborhood, breaking through a market canopy, bouncing higher, back to Betty's house and up to the attic window. Flying through, his foot disconnects the plug to the exercise machine. By now, Betty is pencil thin (her figure thinner than Olive Oyl's), and she looks so funny with the huge head and spindly body that she and Little Jimmy along with the furniture and exercise machine laugh non-stop to the extent that both Betty and Jimmy blow up to be as round as balloons.

== See also ==
- Popeye the Sailor (film)
- Betty Boop with Henry, the Funniest Living American
- Betty Boop and the Little King
