= Román Arámbula =

Mexican comic-book artist

- Born: September 18, 1936; Guadalajara, Mexico
- Died: March 19, 2020 (aged 83)
- Education: National Autonomous University of Mexico
- Occupations: Comic strip artist, animator

Román Arámbula (September 18, 1936 – March 19, 2020) was a Mexican animator and comic strip artist and animator, best known for his work on the Mickey Mouse newspaper comic.
