= Mickey's Garden =

1935 Mickey Mouse cartoon

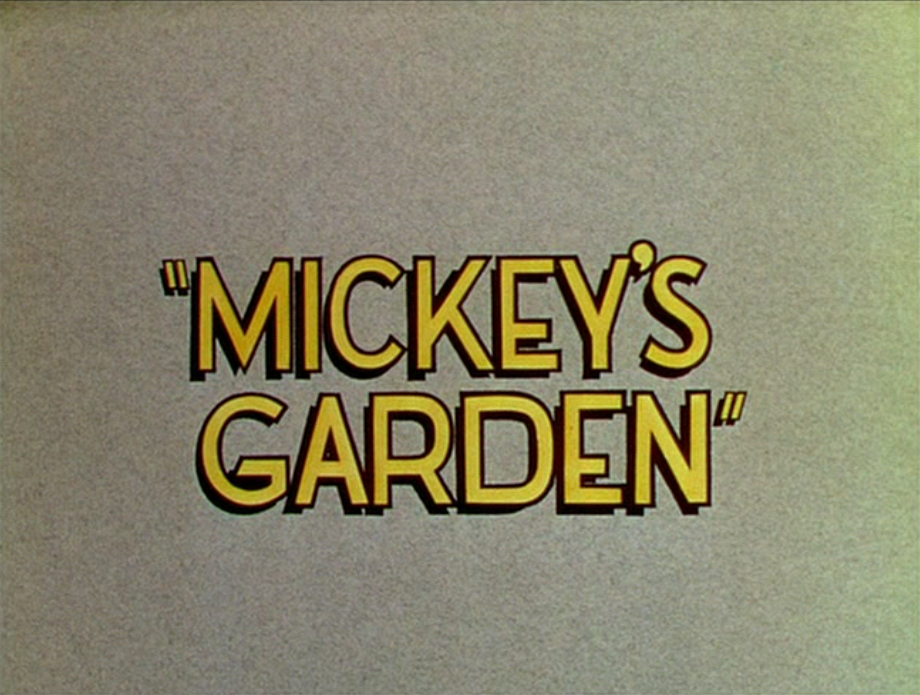
- Directed by: Wilfred Jackson
- Produced by: Walt Disney
- Starring: Walt Disney; Pinto Colvig; Billy Sheets
- Music by: Leigh Harline
- Animation by: Art Babbitt; Frenchy DeTremaudan; Dick Huemer
- Layouts by: Ollie Johnston
- Color process: Technicolor
- Production company: Walt Disney Productions
- Distributed by: United Artists
- Release date: July 13, 1935
- Running time: 8:49
- Country: United States
- Language: English

Mickey's Garden is a 1935 American animated short film produced by Walt Disney Productions and released by United Artists. The film was the second Mickey Mouse cartoon shot in Technicolor (after The Band Concert) and is also the first color appearance of Pluto. The cartoon is also the first color cartoon where Mickey Mouse speaks (though he only does so at the end when Pluto starts licking him). The film's plot centers on Mickey trying to rid his garden of insects, but they keep coming back. When he accidentally gets hit with his own bug spray, he begins seeing a warped reality. It was the 76th Mickey Mouse short film to be released, and the fifth of that year.

== Plot ==
Mickey and Pluto are hunting insects in the garden. Mickey starts shooting insecticide, and the insects start shrieking and run away. Mickey, in an attempt to get rid of them all, continues shooting, but eventually, it runs out – upon seeing this, the insects come out of hiding and go back to his garden to resume eating. Mickey heads towards a big bucket of water and starts stirring some more insecticide with a broom.

Mickey comes back and tries to poison the bugs, but the pump is blocked, and Mickey tries to unblock it with wheat. Meanwhile, Pluto is following a stag beetle, which bites him on the nose. When it taunts him from atop a plant, he lunges at it, but misses and gets his head stuck inside a pumpkin. Panicking, he runs frantically in all directions, before accidentally bumping into Mickey, who gets hit by his own bug spray, and begins seeing hallucinations.

Mickey finds himself in a dangerous imaginary world where he, his house, his stuff, and Pluto have all shrunk and the bugs and plants have become giant. The giant bugs proceed to drink the insecticide, but that only succeeds into making them all (even other bugs) drunk and makes them dizzy and hiccup. Upon noticing them, the enraged bugs begin chasing after Mickey and Pluto. After encounters with a worm and a beetle, Mickey and Pluto climb up and hide in a flower, but are attacked by a bumble bee.

Pluto lands on a branch which turns out to be a caterpillar that throws him into the air. He is then swallowed by a hiccuping firefly. Mickey lands on a leaf, but a drunk grasshopper saws off the leaf with its leg while it laughs. Mickey falls into a tomato atop a green worm, in which he proceeds to ride in the style of Charlie Chaplin, and then wrestles it.

Eventually, Mickey wakes up and discovers, much to his delight, that the worm he was wrestling is actually his hose and that the whole experience was a nightmare. Pluto manages to break free from the pumpkin, inadvertently slingshoting it onto Mickey, and then begins licking him.

== Voice cast ==
- Mickey Mouse: Walt Disney
- Pluto, Grasshopper, Hiccups: Pinto Colvig
- Beetle: Billy Sheets

== Releases ==
- 1935 - theatrical release
- 1988 - Mickey's 60th Birthday

== Magnascope ==
At The Mayfair in Asbury Park, New Jersey, the short was shown with in Magnascope.

== Home media ==
The short was released on December 4, 2001, on Walt Disney Treasures: Mickey Mouse in Living Color.

== See also ==
- Mickey Mouse (film series)
