= A Song a Day =

Grampy in "A Song a Day"
- Directed by: Dave Fleischer
- Story by: Dave Fleischer (uncredited); Isadore Sparber (uncredited)
- Produced by: Max Fleischer
- Starring: Mae Questel (Betty Boop); Everett Clark (Grampy); Jack Mercer (additional voices)
- Music by: Sammy Timberg
- Animation by: David Tendlar; Nick Tafuri; Joseph Oriolo; Additional - uncredited: Eli Brucker; Abner Kneitel; Graham Place; Dick Marion; William Sturm
- Color process: Black-and-white; Technicolor
- Production company: Fleischer Studios
- Distributed by: Paramount Pictures
- Release date: May 22, 1936
- Running time: 7 minutes
- Country: United States
- Language: English

A Song a Day (originally as Grampy in "A Song a Day") is a 1936 Fleischer Studios animated short film starring Betty Boop and featuring Grampy.

== Synopsis ==
At Betty Boop's Animal Hospital, various animals have appropriate ailments - a giraffe has a pain in the neck, a herring is pickled, etc. Morale becomes a problem until Professor Grampy comes to the rescue with a song and dance to cure the blues.
