= Judge for a Day =

1935 American animated Betty Boop film

- Directed by: Dave Fleischer
- Story by: William Turner (uncredited)
- Produced by: Max Fleischer
- Starring: Mae Questel
- Animation by: Hicks Lokey; Myron Waldman; Edward Nolan (unc.); Lillian Friedman (unc.); Herman Cohen (unc.); Frank Andres (unc.); Ted Vosk (unc.)
- Color process: Black-and-white
- Production company: Fleischer Studios
- Distributed by: Paramount Pictures
- Release date: September 20, 1935
- Running time: 7 minutes
- Country: United States
- Language: English

Judge for a Day is a 1935 Fleischer Studios animated short film starring Betty Boop.

== Synopsis ==
Betty is the stenographer at the local courthouse. On the bus ride to work one day, she grows tired of the obnoxious actions of some of her fellow citizens (which she refers to as "pests"), and upon getting to the court house, puts on a judge's robe and sits in the judge's seat fantasizing in song out loud about what she'd do if she were the judge. Among her decrees: In the city park, "PUBLIC PEST NO. 8 BLOWS SMOKE AT YOU AND THINKS ITS GREAT" a thoughtless smoker learns about second-hand smoke by being tided up and forced to inhale candle smoke, "PUBLIC PEST NO. 9 SLAPS YOUR BACK AND SHAKES YOUR SPINE" A man is bound by a woman's girdle and is constantly slapped on the back by a mechanical arm while being told "Hi, ya pa!" by a machine, "PUBLIC PEST NO. 21 WHO ALWAYS PARKS HIS CHEWING GUM" A man is stuck with an overabundance of gum on the walls and floor, "PUBLIC PEST NO. 23 HE SPASHES MUD ON YOU AND ME" A man is tided to a street lamp and is splashed in the face with mud from a car-wheel contraption, "PUBLIC PEST NO. 24 WHO USES HOT WATER ‘TIL THERE IS NO MORE" A man is bound to a bath tub with giant ice cubes in it, and "PUBLIC PEST NO. 44 WHOSE RADIO IMITATIONS MAKE YOU SORE" an obnoxious celebrity impersonator is bound to a chair and rewarded by having his ears blasted with imitations of Joe Penner, Ed Wynn, George Givot, Eddie Cantor, The Shadow, and Porland Hoffa, among others.

The townsfolk outside overhear her song and vocalize their agreement, leading to Betty being elected as judge with full support from the town.
