= House Cleaning Blues =

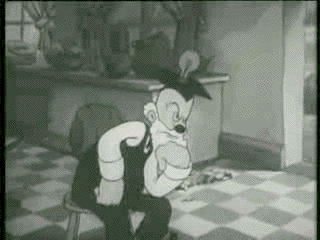
- Directed by: Dave Fleischer
- Produced by: Max Fleischer
- Starring: Mae Questel (Betty Boop); Everett Clark (Grampy); Jack Mercer (Roosters)
- Music by: Sammy Timberg
- Animation by: David Tendlar; Eli Brucker
- Color process: Black-and-white
- Production company: Fleischer Studios
- Distributed by: Paramount Pictures
- Release date: January 15, 1937
- Running time: 7 minutes
- Country: United States
- Language: English

House Cleaning Blues is a 1937 Fleischer Studios animated short film starring Betty Boop, and featuring Grampy.

== Synopsis ==
Betty wakes up in the morning after her birthday party. The house is a shamble, and Betty is not looking forward to cleaning up. She sings the title song while struggling with her chores. Grampy shows up to take Betty out for a drive, but Betty can't leave until everything is tidy.

Grampy literally puts on his thinking cap (a mortarboard with a lightbulb on top), and invents a host of labor-saving devices: a cuckoo clock powered dishwasher, a combination bicycle and floor scrubber, and a player piano that folds laundry. In no time at all, the dancing inventor has the house spic and span, just in time to take Betty for a spin in his automobile (which features a built-in soda fountain).

== Notes ==
- This is the first episode in which Betty doesn't have a separated layer of her hair shown.
