= Paul van Vliet =

Dutch comedian (1935–2023)

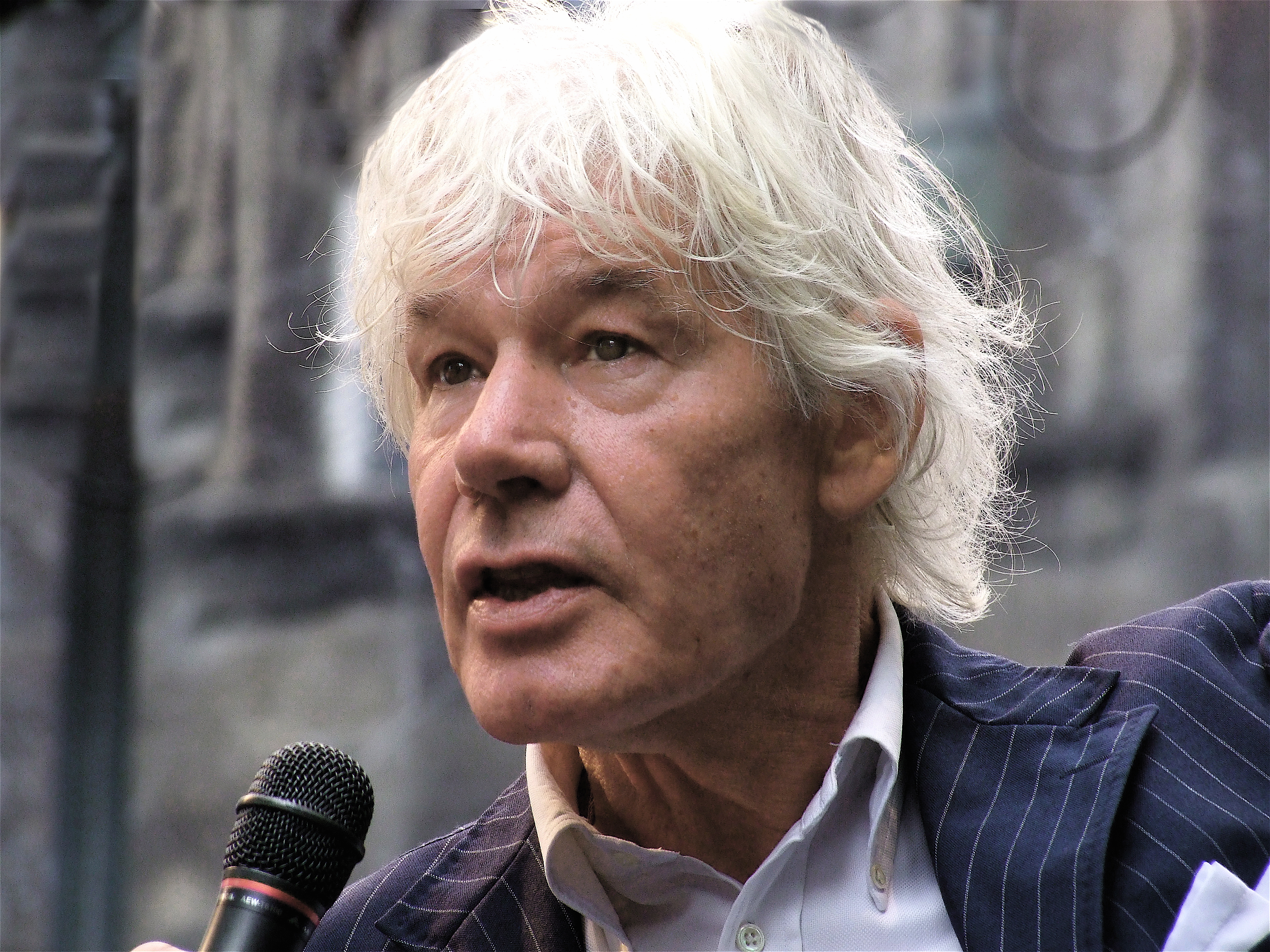

Paul van Vliet (The Hague, 10 September 1935 – 25 April 2023) was a Dutch comedian, singer and goodwill ambassador of UNICEF.

== Career ==
In 1957, he started his career as a comedian within the student cabaret of Leiden, whereupon he performed with Cabaret PePijn from 1964 until 1969. Since 1970, he had a successful solo career as a cabaret artist. As a musician, Van Vliet was best known for his songs Veilig Achterop (Bij Vader Op De Fiets) and Pappa Is Blijven Hangen Aan De Sixties. In the animated TV series Alfred Jodocus Kwak, he voiced King Radboud.
