= Making Stars =

- Directed by: Dave Fleischer
- Produced by: Max Fleischer
- Starring: Mae Questel
- Animation by: Edward Nolan; Herman Cohen; Myron Waldman; Hicks Lokey; Lillian Friedman; Frank Endres; Ted Vosk; Sam Stimson (uncredited)
- Color process: Black-and-white
- Production company: Fleischer Studios
- Distributed by: Paramount Pictures
- Release date: October 18, 1935
- Running time: 7 minutes
- Country: United States
- Language: English

Making Stars is a 1935 Fleischer Studios animated short film, starring Betty Boop. The short contains one of the earliest clear examples of the oriental riff that would become popular as a leitmotif for Asian culture following the release of the 1974 song Kung Fu Fighting.

== Synopsis ==
Betty is the MC of "Making Stars", a stage revue introducing the "stars of tomorrow", a series of performing babies. Acts include the Colorful 3 (a trio of stereotyped Black babies singing "Hi De Ho"), an Asian baby marksman, and a bouncing Russian baby named "Little Miss Trotsky."
