= The Quail Hunt =

- Title card
- Directed by: Tex Avery (uncredited)
- Story by: Walter Lantz; Victor McLeod
- Music by: James Dietrich
- Animation by: Fred Kopietz; Bill Mason; Ray Abrams; Ed Benedict
- Color process: Black and white
- Production company: Walter Lantz Productions
- Distributed by: Universal Pictures
- Release date: September 23, 1935
- Running time: 5:45
- Language: English

The Quail Hunt is a 1935 short theatrical cartoon by Universal Pictures starring Oswald the Lucky Rabbit. It is the 103rd Oswald cartoon by Walter Lantz Productions and the 155th in the entire series. This is one of the last two shorts to feature Oswald in his classic design, the last official appearance of his classic design was in the short Monkey Wretches.

== Plot ==
The full cartoon short

Oswald and his dog Elmer the Great Dane are in the woods hunting for birds, especially quails. Though equipped with a boomstick, Oswald finds it difficult to take down a single quail as the fowls are quite clever. He even has problems trying not to get pushed back each time he fires his gun.

Heading further in the forest, Elmer chases a little quail. The dog follows until he naively runs past a cliff. Instead of letting the hound plummet into the ground, however, the little quail moves and breaks Elmer's fall. Elmer is most thankful and therefore befriends the small bird.

While things are going well for Elmer and the little quail, a hawk appears before them and sets sights on the tiny bird. As the hawk goes for a strike, Elmer struggles to defend his little friend. Eventually, the hawk and the dog collide into each other, resulting the buzzard being naked and Elmer covered in feathers.

Oswald finally shows up at the scene. Thinking the dog is a turkey due to the latter's feathery exterior, Oswald fires his gun at Elmer, blowing the feathers off. He then notices the little quail, and therefore begins shooting at it too. Elmer immediately intervenes and tells him the small bird is now friends with them. Elmer then embraces Oswald and the little quail in both arms.

== See also ==
- Oswald the Lucky Rabbit filmography
