= Betty Boop and Grampy =

- Directed by: Dave Fleischer
- Story by: William Turner; Jack Ward (unc.); Thomas Johnson (unc.)
- Produced by: Max Fleischer
- Starring: Mae Questel (Betty Boop); Everett Clark (Grampy); Jack Mercer (additional voices)
- Music by: Sammy Timberg
- Animation by: David Tendlar; Charles Hastings; Tex Henson; Thomas Johnson (unc.); Sam Stimson (unc.); Graham Place (unc.)
- Color process: Black-and-white
- Production company: Fleischer Studios
- Distributed by: Paramount Pictures
- Release date: August 16, 1935
- Running time: 7 minutes
- Country: United States
- Language: English

Betty Boop and Grampy is a 1935 Fleischer Studios animated short film starring Betty Boop. The short features Grampy in his first appearance.

== Plot ==
Betty receives an invitation to a party from her elderly relative, Grampy. As she strolls along singing "I'm On My Way to Grampy's", she is joined by two moving men, a fireman and a traffic cop—all who irresponsibly drop everything (including a piano, a burning house and a traffic jam) to go to Grampy's party.

Grampy is an eccentric inventor, whose labor-saving devices are of the Rube Goldberg variety. For example, he has a device that moves his entire house to the front entrance whenever the doorbell is rung. The glass shade of his ceiling light is rigged to double as a punch bowl, and he has modified an old umbrella to slice a cake into wedges.

Grampy entertains his guests by building self-playing musical instruments out of household gadgets (which then play "Hold That Tiger"). Everyone dances until they drop from exhaustion, the exception being the exuberant Grampy.

== In other media ==
Allie's Activity Kit CD-Rom has clips from the Betty Boop Cartoon when the games are won.

A short clip from this cartoon can be seen in the opening credits of the Futurama episode "Hell Is Other Robots."

Clips from this cartoon are seen in the music video for The Outhere Brothers' song "Boom Boom Boom".

A segment of music from this cartoon was sampled for the episode "Fire Dogs 2" of Ren & Stimpy "Adult Party Cartoon", when Ren dances to a flute song by Stimpy.
