= About an Old Man, an Old Woman and Their Hen Ryaba =

About an Old Man, an Old Woman and Their Hen Ryaba Про деда, бабу и курочку Рябу
- Directed by: Alexander Davydov
- Written by: Roman Kachanov
- Cinematography: Svetlana Koshcheyeva
- Edited by: V. Laev
- Music by: Nina Savicheva
- Release date: 24 April 1982
- Running time: 8 minutes
- Country: Soviet Union
- Language: Russian

About an Old Man, an Old Woman and Their Hen Ryaba (Russian: Про деда, бабу и курочку Рябу) is a 1982 Soviet Animation film by Alexander Romanovich Davydov. This cartoon was filming by Soyuzmultfilm studio. The film received national and international recognition.

== Plot summary ==
The plot of the film is based on the Russian folk tale "Kurochka Ryaba" ("Ryaba the hen"). This tale is told, how a hen laid a golden egg. The Old Man and the Old Woman could not eat The Egg, because The Egg does not contain anything but a gold. They were to be hungry. The Hen laid The Egg Simple. Old Man and Old Woman were able to eat The Simple Egg and praise The Food.

== Creators ==
	English	Russian
Director	Alexander Davydov	Александр Давыдов
Writer	Roman Kachanov	Роман Качанов
Art Directors	Tatiana Zvorykina, Vladimir Zuikov	Татьяна Зворыкина, Владимир Зуйков
Animators	Yuriy Meshcheryakov, Dmitry Kulikov, Youry Kuziurin, Galina Zebrova, T. Pomerantseva	Юрий Мещеряков, Дмитрий Куликов, Юрий Кузюрин, Галина Зеброва, Татьяна Померанцева
Artists	Olga Novosselova, Svetlana Davydova	Ольга Новоселова, Светлана Давыдова
Camera	Svetlana Koshcheyeva	Светлана Кощеева
Music	Nina Savicheva	Нина Савичева
Sound Operator	Vladimir Kutuzov	Владимир Кутузов
Executive Producer	Lubov Butyrina	Любовь Бутырина
Editor	V. Laev	В. Лаэв
Script Editor	Tatiana Paporova	Татьяна Папорова
