= Kurt-Hans Goedicke =

German percussionist (1935–2025)

Kurt-Hans Goedicke (February 1935 – 21 August 2025) was a German percussionist. He was for 36 years the timpanist in the London Symphony Orchestra, where what The Times called his "unbridled virtuosity" contributed to the orchestra's worldwide popularity. The Times also described him as a musician "of formidable intellect, imagination and technique." Early in his career he was principal timpanist with the Radio Eireann Orchestra. He worked with many of the world's eminent conductors, and became known on television in Andre Previn's "Music Night" series. He was elected to the LSO's Board and served as its vice-chairman for six years. He taught at the Guildhall School of Music and Drama and the Royal Academy of Music, as well as the Royal Irish Academy of Music and the Royal Scottish Academy of Music and Drama.

== Early life and musical beginnings ==
Goedicke was born on 17 February 1935 in East Berlin. He was educated at Knaben Hochschule and studied music at the Universitat der Kunste in Berlin, where he graduated with honours. He was "a talented pianist", and studied the clarinet before moving to percussion and timpani. He freelanced in East Berlin before moving to Dublin in 1954, where he became principal timpanist with the Radio Eireann Orchestra.

== London Symphony Orchestra ==
In 1964, after working again briefly in Germany, Goedicke moved to London and joined the London Symphony Orchestra as principal timpanist. He worked with some of the best conductors in the world, including Leonard Bernstein, Sir Colin Davis, Andre Previn, Pierre Boulez, Claudio Abbado and Istavan Kertesz. His playing was described as "colourful and virtuosic" and his "unerring accuracy and sensitive interpretations" were praised. He was said to have acquired "more than 200 sets of playing sticks" throughout his career, and would select "from a large trayful" for each entry.

In 1978 he visited Russia with the LSO, undertook a world tour with the orchestra in 1983, visited Oman in 1985, performed many times at festivals across Europe, and appeared frequently in the BBC television series 'Andre Previn's Music Night'. He performed with the LSO at the opening of the Barbican Centre in London in 1982, in the Mahler, Vienna and Twentieth Century series with Abbdo in 1985 and the Bernstein Festival in 1986, the Rostropvich Birthday Series in 1987 and 1997, and at the LSO's 75th birthday event at the Royal Festival Hall in London and the 90th at the Barbican Centre. He contributed to recordings of "everything from the complete symphonic output of Ralph Vaughan Williams to the often challenging film scores of John Williams."

Goedicke was elected to the board of the LSO and was one of nine directors who were responsible for the orchestra's musical, financial and administrative concerns. He was elected as the LSO's vice-chairman in 1977 and served in this post for six years until 1983. He supervised the orchestra's move to the Barbican Centre. His farewell concert with the orchestra in March 2000 included Stravinsky's 'Rite of Spring', in which he had performed many times in his career, and Bartok's 'Music for Strings'.

== Other activities ==
Goedicke taught at the Guildhall School of Music and at the Royal Academy of Music in London, where he was a professor of percussion and timpani. He was described as "an influential teacher". He also taught at The Royal Irish Academy of Music in Dublin and the Royal Scottish Academy of Music and Drama in Glasgow. He moved to Scotland in 2004 and took up the position of Distinguished Fellow in Timpani and Percussion and Head of Department at the Royal Conservatoire of Scotland in Glasgow. The LSO remembered him as "a passionate educator who held master classes all over the world". He gave master classes in Tokyo, Berlin, New York and the UK. In 2008/09 he was tutor and coach to members of the European Union Youth Orchestra. Goedicke retired in September 2023 aged 88.

Professor Aaron Shorr, Director of Music at The Royal Conservatoire of Scotland, said Goedicke had been "a towering figure in the world of orchestral percussion, inspiring generations of students and colleagues" and recalled his "overwhelming musical presence, mesmeric musical rigour, exactitude and power."

== Private life and death ==
Goedicke's wife Angela, a former chairwoman of the Church Recording Society and co-editor of 'Stained Glass Marks and Monograms, died in 2024. Goedicke, who was a "fanatical badminton player" and a practising Buddhist, died after sustaining injuries in a fall on 21 August 2025, aged 90.

== Sources ==
- London Symphony Orchestra: obituary
- Royal Conservatoire of Scotland: obituary
- Daily Telegraph: obituary
- The Violin Channel: obituary
