= Lillian Friedman Astor =

American animator (1912–1989)

- Born: April 12, 1912; New York City, U.S.
- Died: July 9, 1989 (aged 77)
- Occupation: Animator
- Years active: 1930–1939
- Children: 1
- Awards: Motion Picture Screen Cartoonists Golden Award (1987 honoree)

Lillian Friedman Astor (born April 12, 1912 – July 9, 1989) was an American animator who was one of the first female animators in the country. She worked for Fleischer Brothers' studio, inking and eventually animating various Betty Boop cartoons, as well as one Popeye, some Color Classics, and several Hunky and Spunky cartoons, although she received screen credit on only six of the forty-two cartoons she animated in her lifetime. The Fleischer Studios' policy was to never credit more than two animators in a cartoon, and Friedman was usually one of the animators left out from the credits.

== Personal life ==
Born in New York City, Friedman started drawing at the age of 12 and later attended Washington Irving High School, where she studied commercial art and fashion design. After graduating, she worked as a fashion designer.

== Animation career ==
Friedman began as an inker, colorist, and inbetweener, along with a classmate named Lillian Oremland, in July 1930 in a small animation studio financed by Montrose Newman working for a pilot that was a fantasy set to Spring Song. They then became inbetweeners at Frank Goldman's Audio Cinema, in a space shared with Terrytoons. She recalls animating a Listerine commercial with germ characters designed by Dr. Seuss, which Astor expressed frustration about his inability to animate. Through Goldman's friendship with Fleischer, they were both hired as inbetweeners at Fleischer Studios in July 1931. Shamus Culhane, liked her work so much that he hired her as an animation assistant in February 1932, but in April of that same year Culhane's idea of having an assistant was abandoned and she went back to inbetweening, but Culhane continued to encourage her on her dreams of being an animator. In 1933, head of Timing Department Nellie Sanborn gave her the chance to redo a scene from a Betty Boop film and showed it to the Fleischer brothers without telling them it was done by a girl inbetweener; in July 1933, she was signed to a three-year contract as an animator, where she got paid $30 a week. After briefly being in Seymour Kneitel's unit, where the animators were all mean to Astor and made sarcastic remarks, she went to Myron Waldman's unit, which was the opposite and had very nice young animators who accepted her as one of them.

She animated for an Popeye cartoon, where she was uncredited, Can You Take It (1934). Her animation work also appears in, Betty Boop's Prize Show (1934), Making Stars (1935), Judge for a Day (1935), Be Human (1936), The New Deal Show (1937), Pudgy Takes a Bow-Wow (1937), Buzzy Boop at the Concert (1938), Pudgy and the Lost Kitten (1938), Honest Love and True (1938), and the Color Classic Hawaiian Birds (1936). She was also responsible for animating several scenes in Popeye the Sailor Meets Sindbad the Sailor in 1936, specifically Popeye giving the "twisker" punch and the two-headed giant, "Boola."Hunky and Spunky and Educated fish were two cartoon classics that she helped animate that were nominated for Oscars.

In 1937, the employees at Fleischer went on strike and went past the picket line, and so did Astor. Her open stand for the Commercial Artists and Designers Union, since she was hired there that year, caused direct and indirect abuse from catcalling from the company and they forced her not to get paid more unless she stayed with the union. She failed to find a job after the studio moved to Miami, Florida (a move successfully designed to bust the union). When her husband finally got a job in February 1939, she put aside her animation career to raise a family.
