= List of people from Indiana =

Notable people from Indiana

State flag of Indiana

Location of Indiana in the United States

This is a list of notable people who were born or lived in the American state of Indiana.

== Military ==
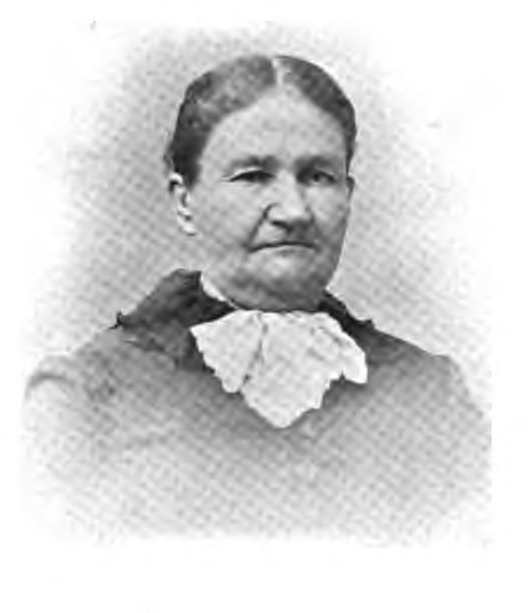
Martha Baker

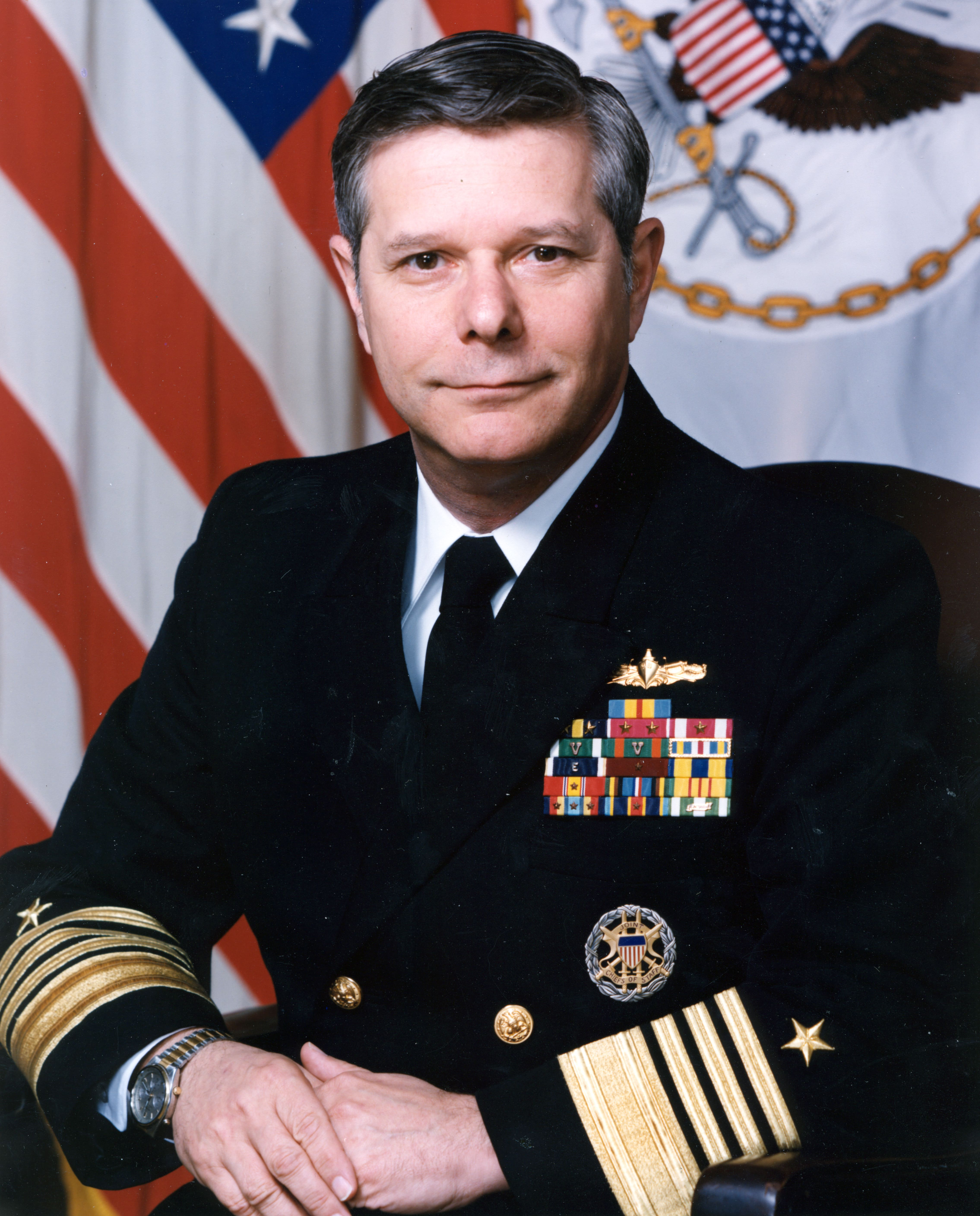
Jeremy Michael Boorda

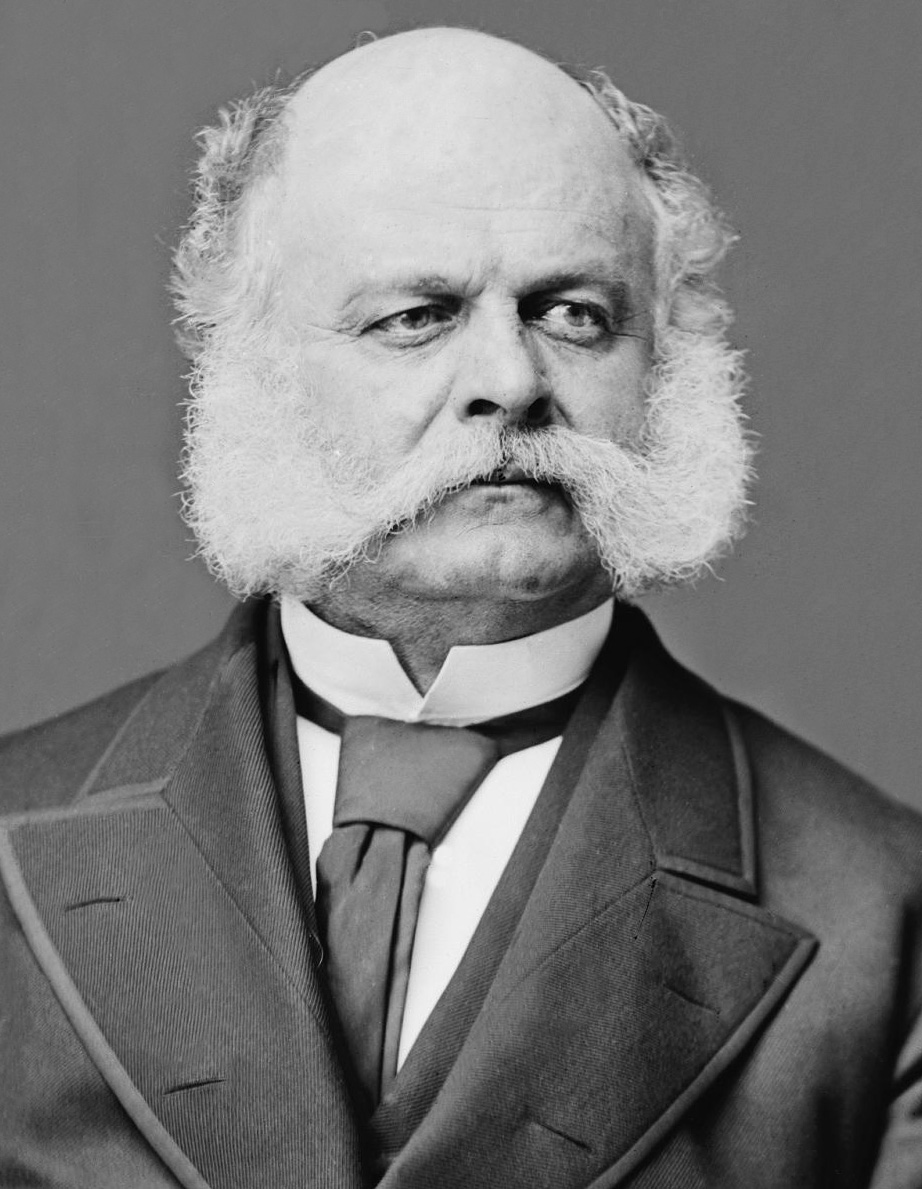
Ambrose Burnside

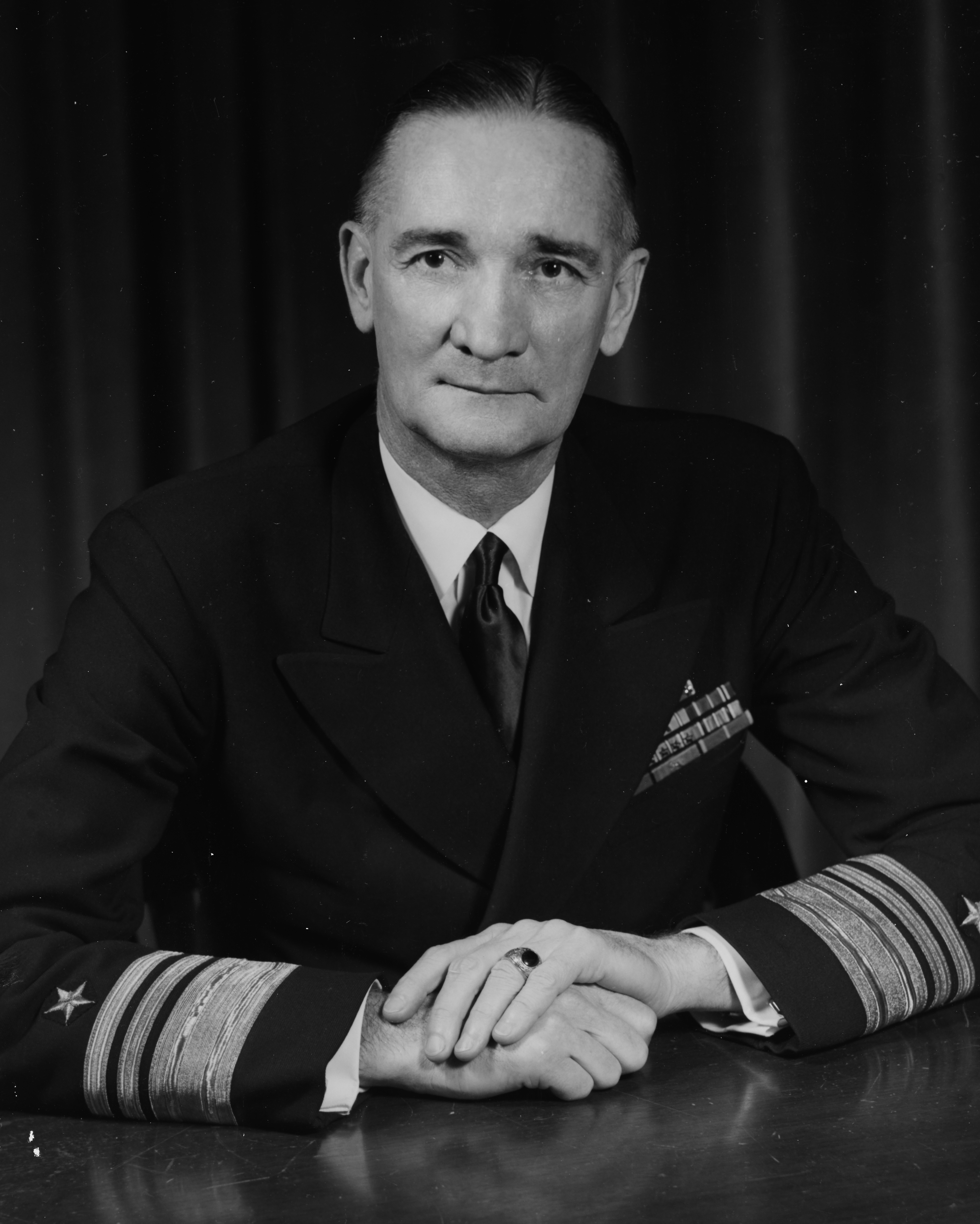
John Howard Cassady

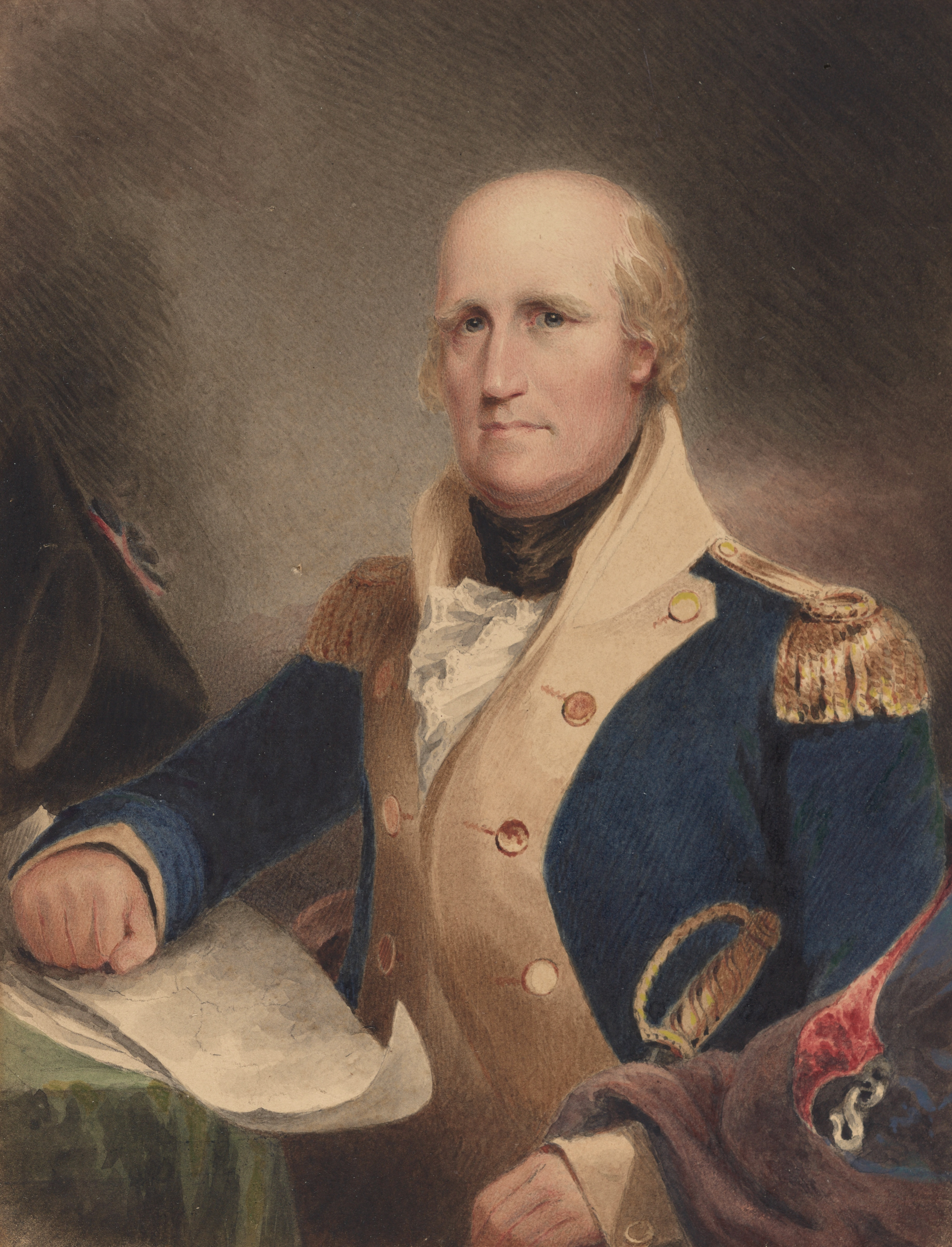
George Rogers Clark

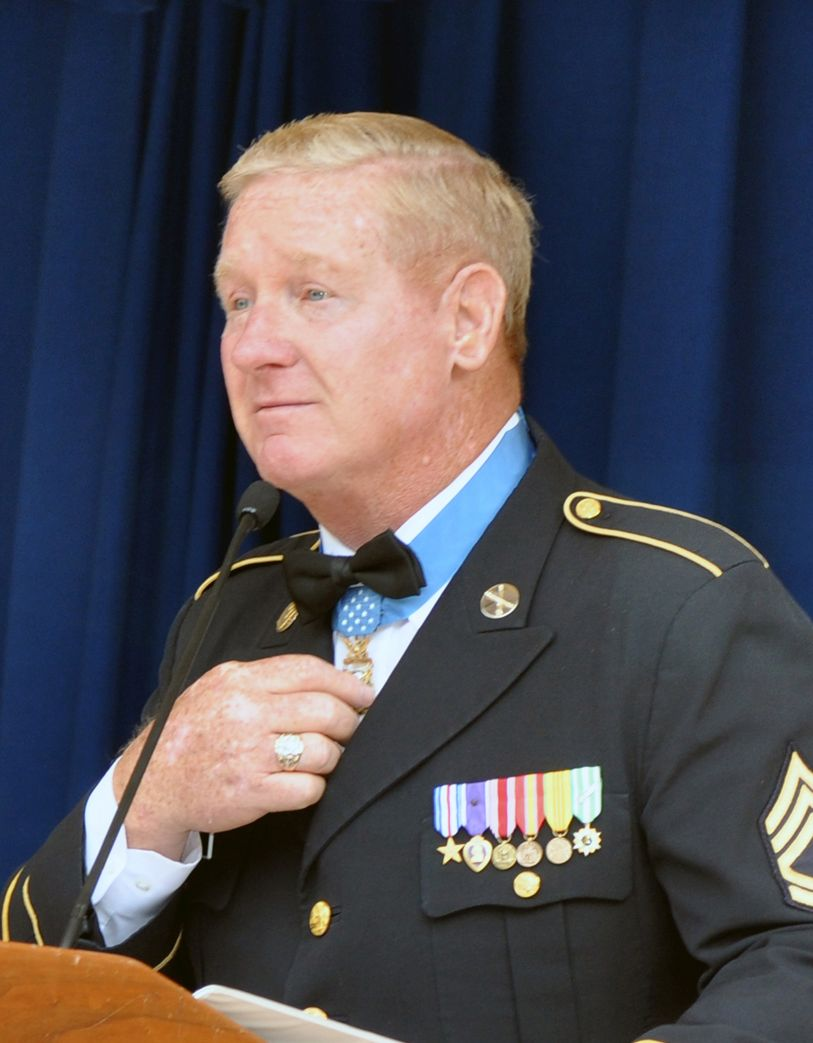
Sammy L. Davis

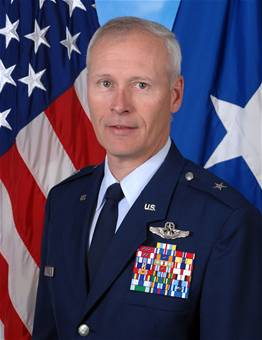
Jonathan D. George

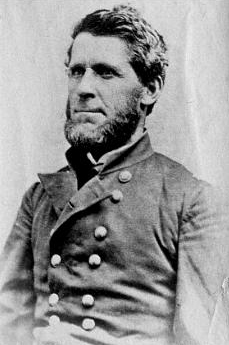
William Grose

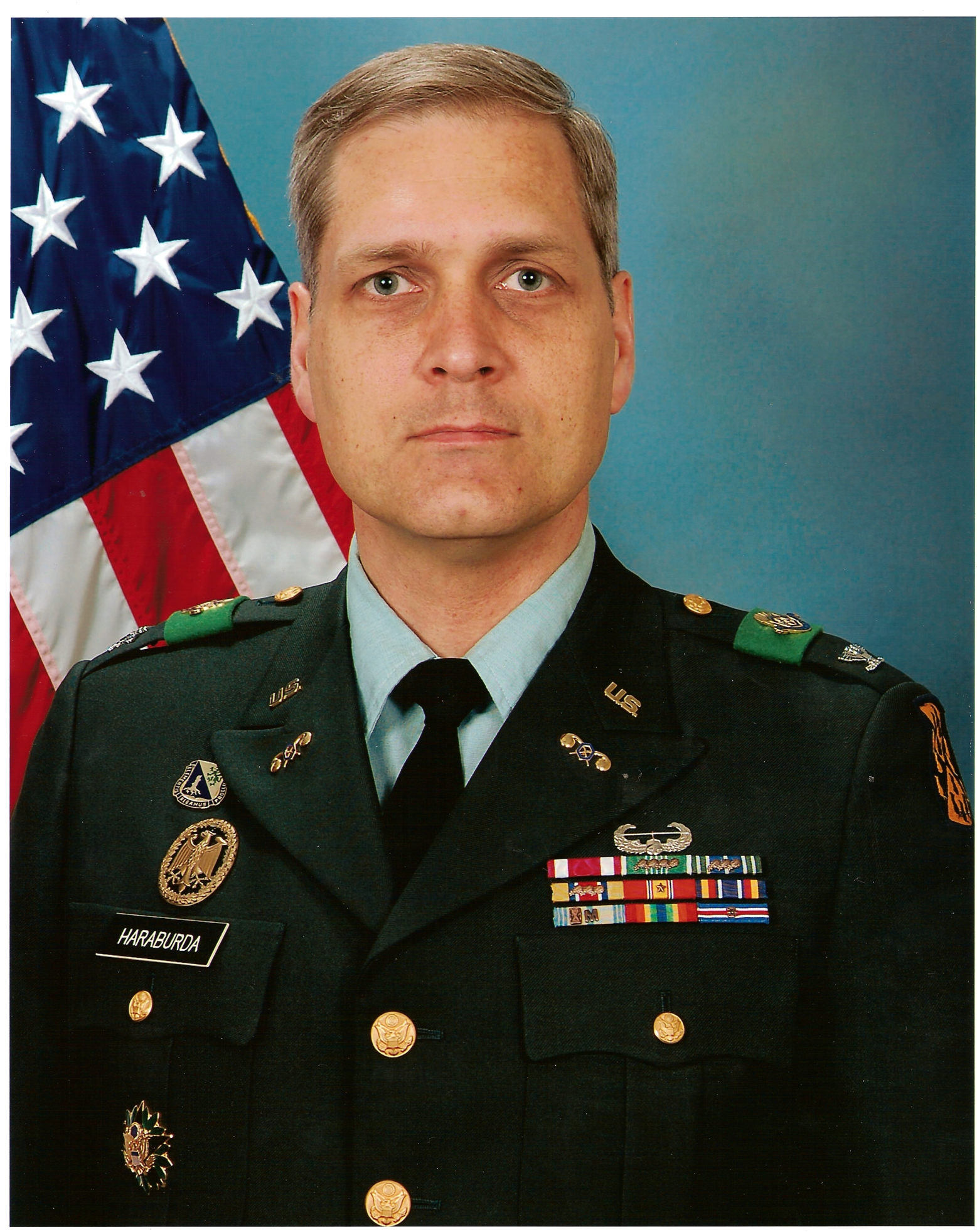
Scott S. Haraburda

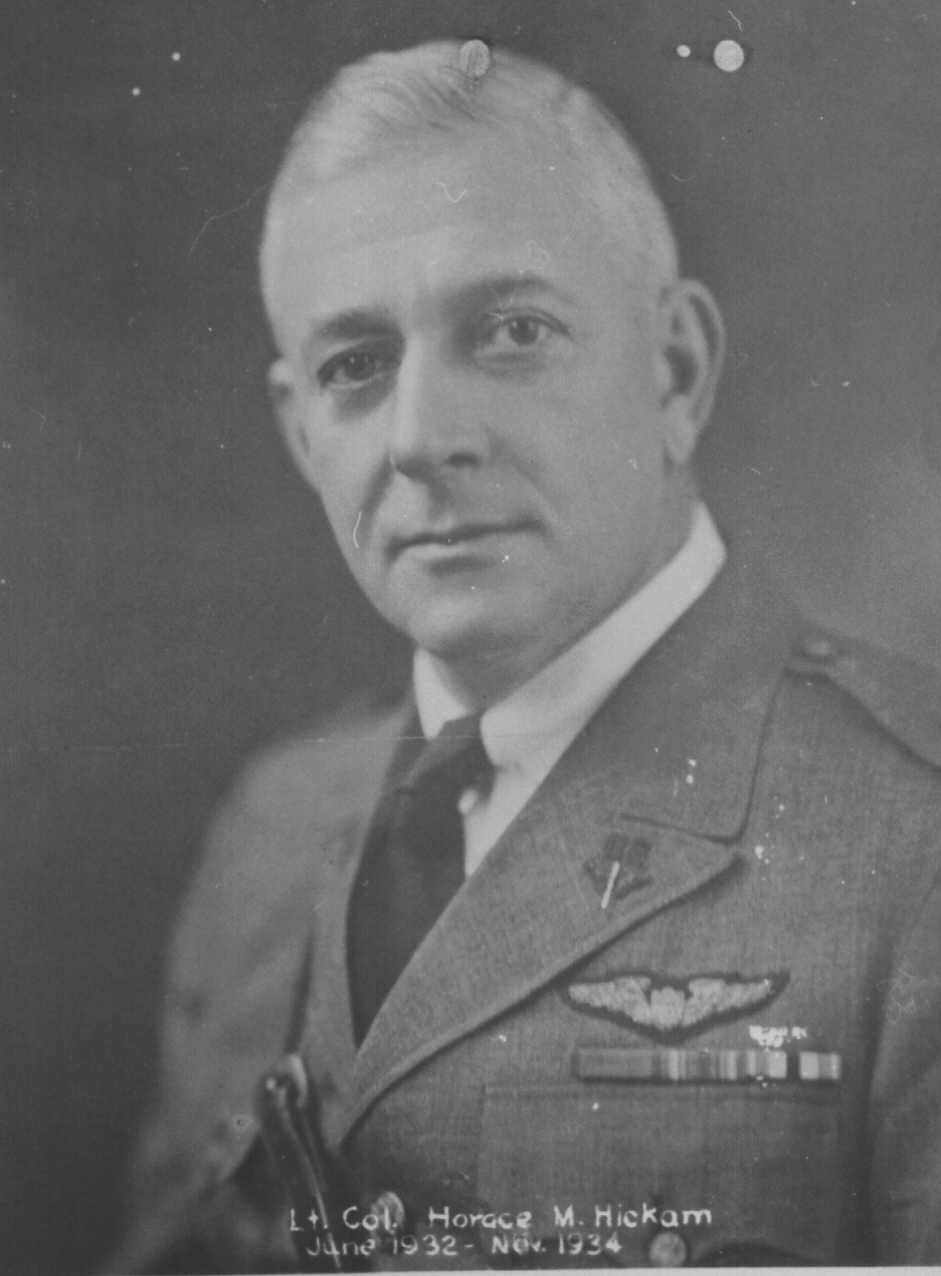
Horace Meek Hickam

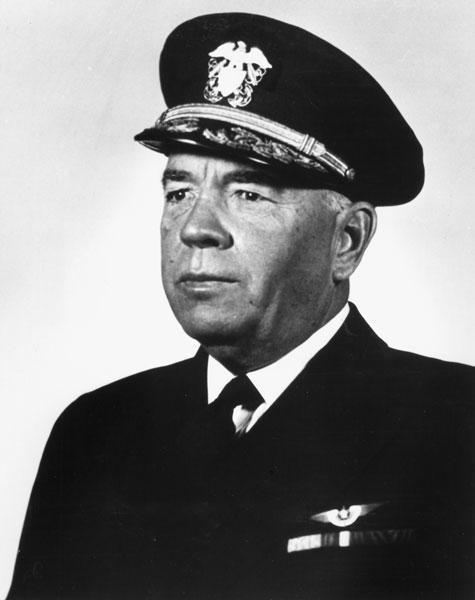
Jonas Ingram

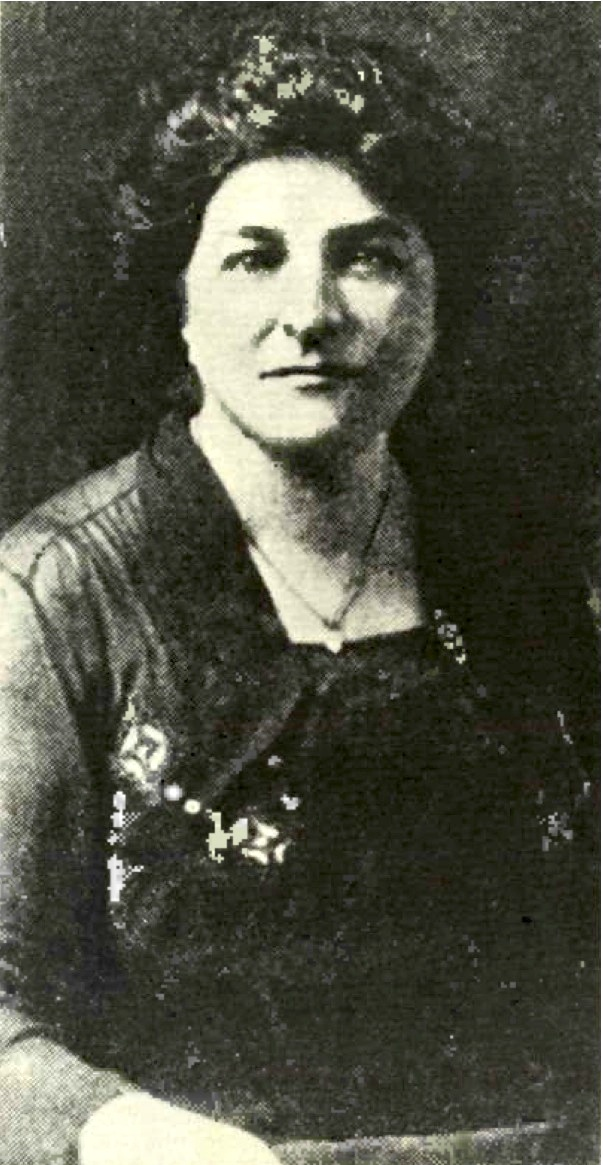
Opha May Johnson

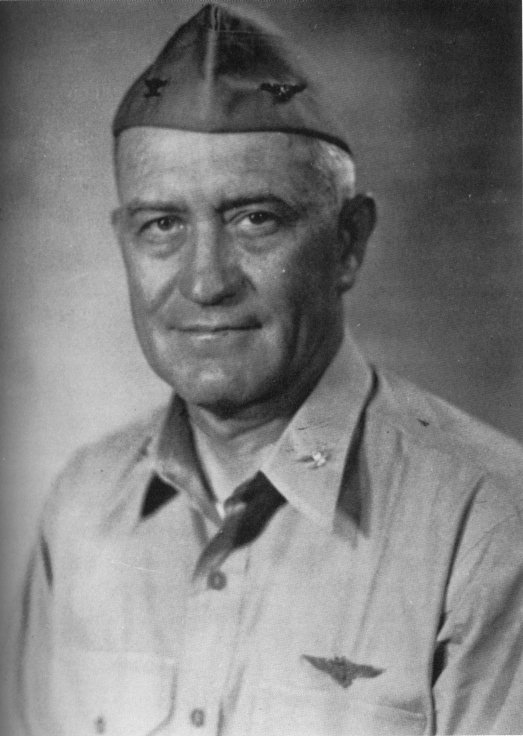
Henry Maston Mullinnix

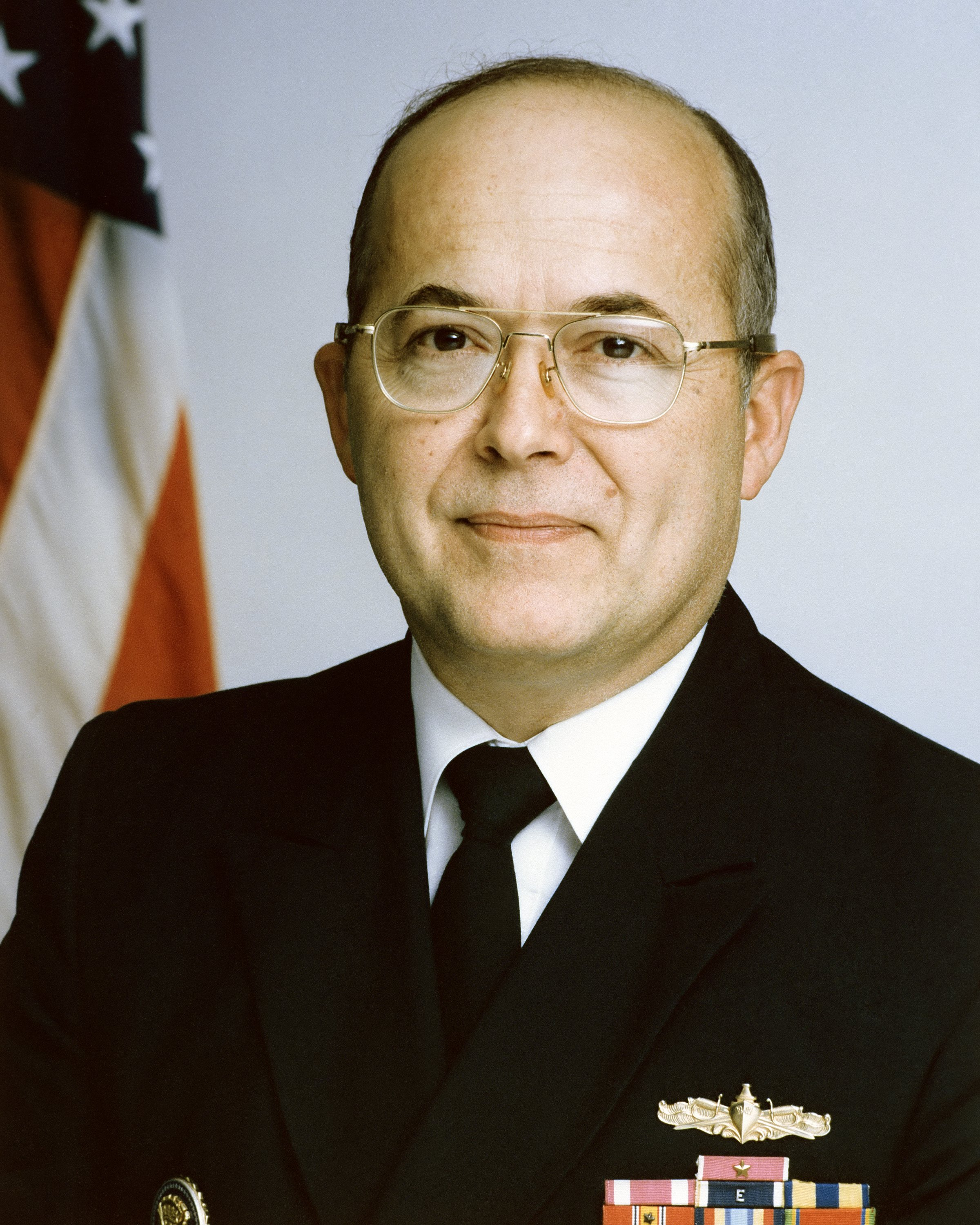
John Poindexter

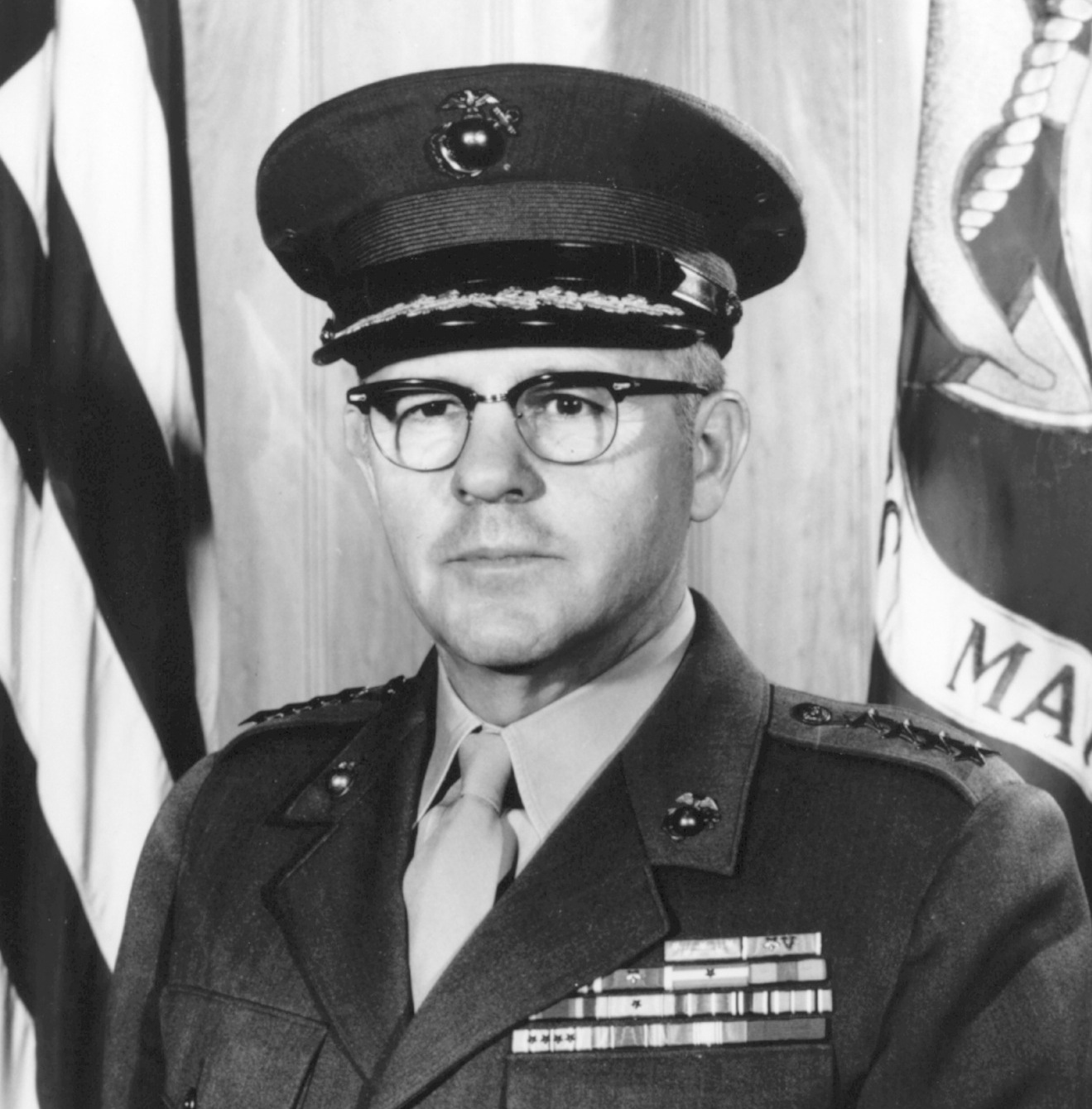
David M. Shoup

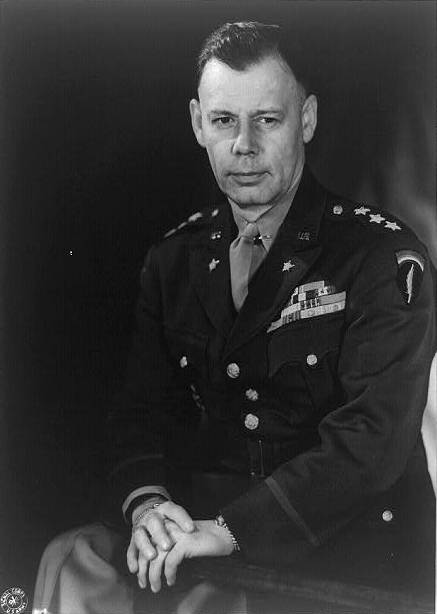
Walter Bedell Smith

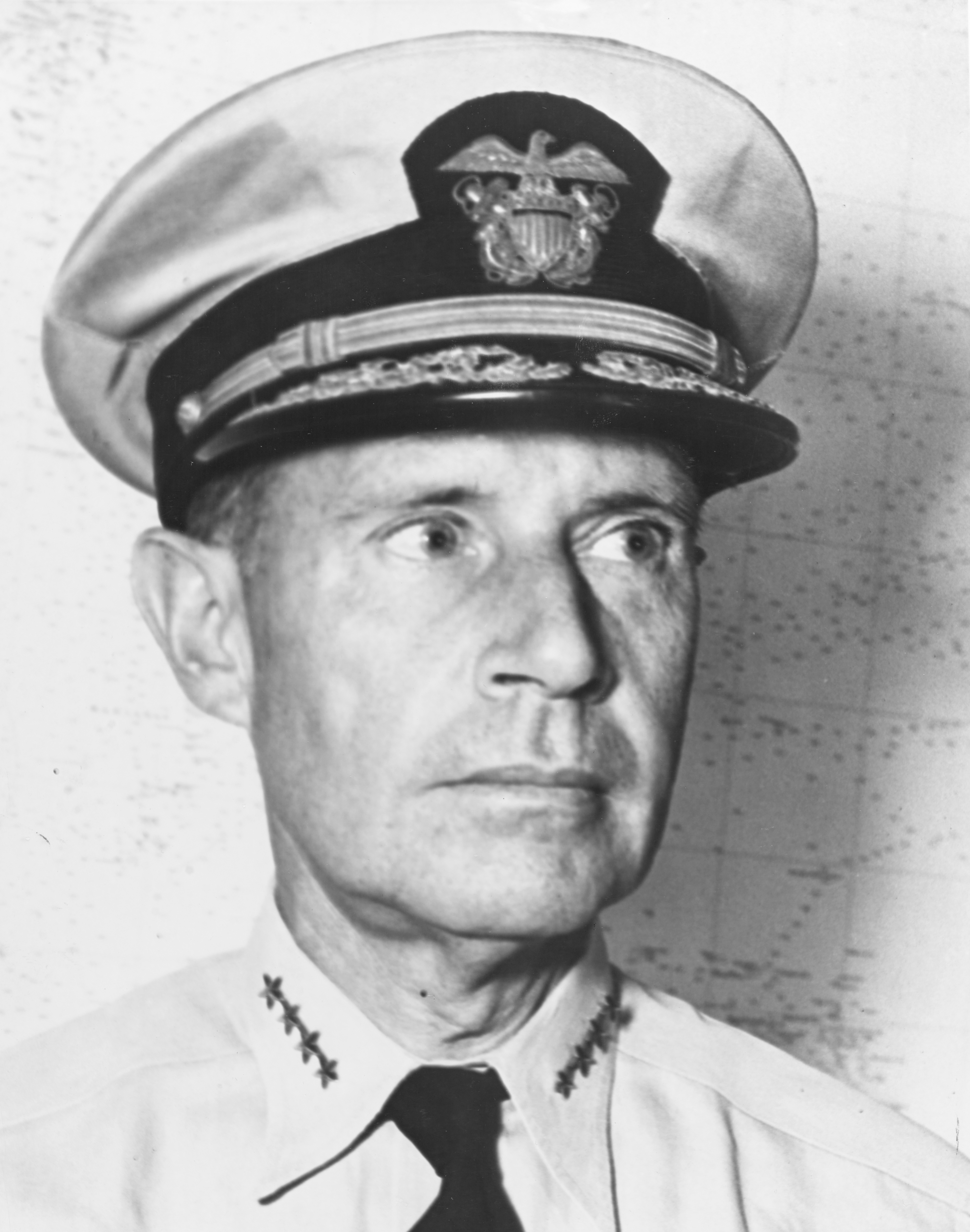
Raymond Ames Spruance

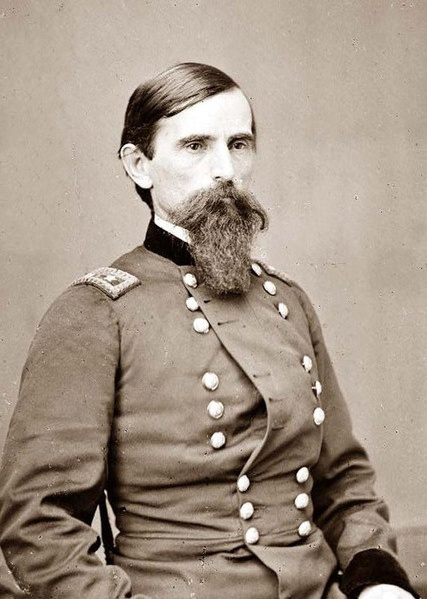
Lew Wallace

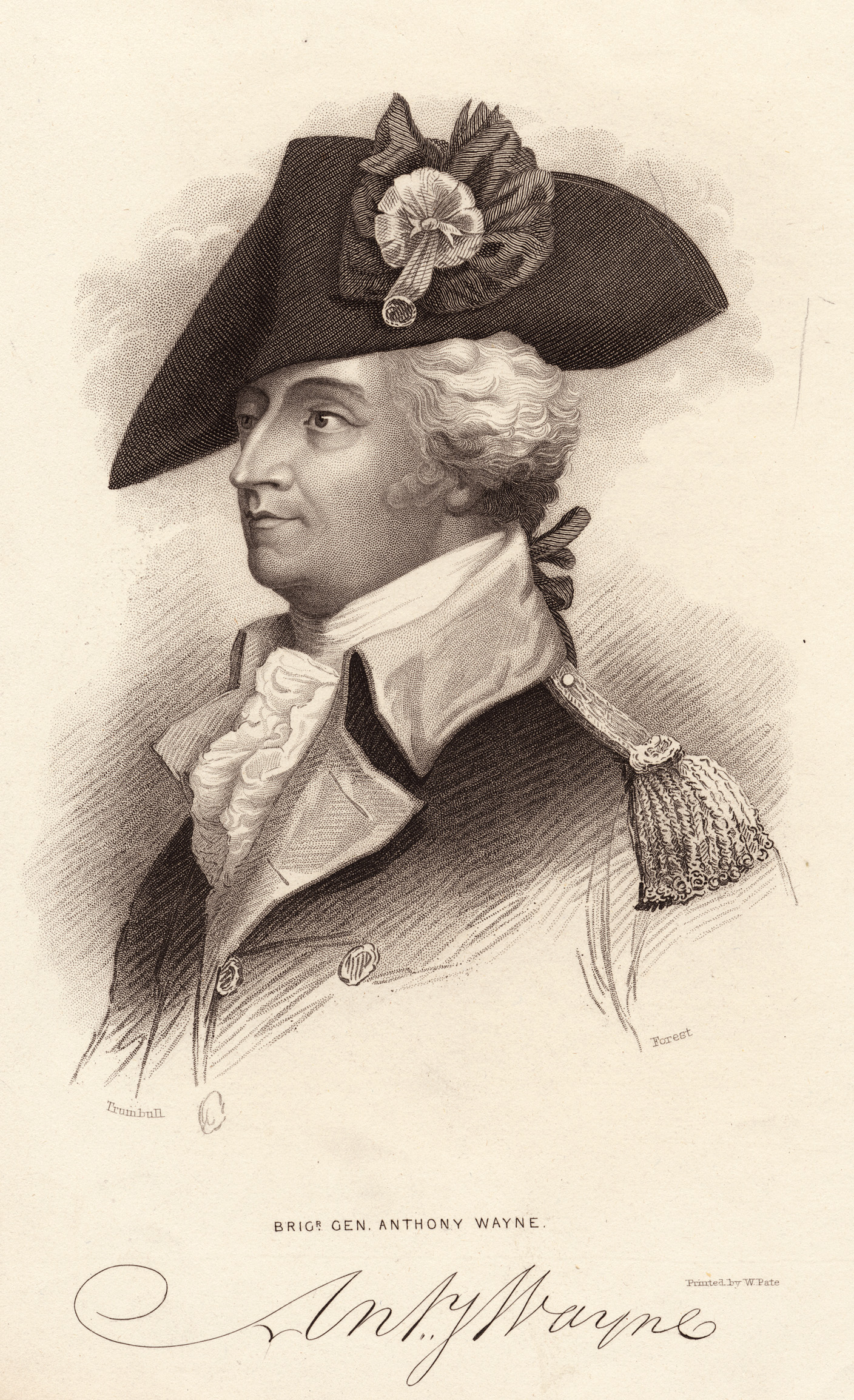
Anthony Wayne

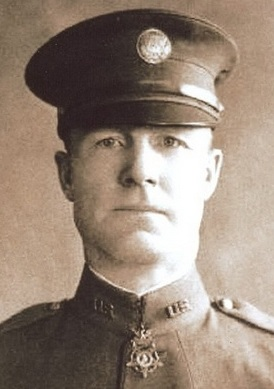
Samuel Woodfill

- Marion T. Anderson, Medal of Honor recipient in American Civil War (Decatur County)
- Martha Baker, nurse in the American Civil War (Concord)
- Jeremy Michael Boorda, admiral, Chief of Naval Operations (South Bend)
- Ambrose Burnside, general in the Civil War, sideburns are named after him (Liberty)
- John Howard Cassady, U.S. Navy admiral, commander in chief, Naval Forces Eastern Atlantic and Mediterranean (Spencer)
- George Rogers Clark, man who conquered Indiana for the United States (Clarksville)
- Sammy L. Davis, Medal of Honor recipient from Vietnam War, U.S. Army (Freedom)
- Jonathan D. George, retired Air Force brigadier general, 9th District congressional candidate (Bedford)
- William Grose, Civil War general (New Castle)
- Scott S. Haraburda, colonel, U.S. Army; president of the Indiana Society of Professional Engineers (Spencer)
- Horace Meek Hickam, lieutenant colonel, U.S. Army Air Corps; aviation pioneer; Hickam AFB named in his honor (Spencer)
- Jonas Ingram, Medal of Honor recipient, Atlantic Fleet commander in World War II (Jeffersonville)
- Opha May Johnson, first woman known to have enlisted in the United States Marine Corps (Kokomo)
- Henry Maston Mullinnix, rear admiral, U.S. Navy; USS Mullinnix was named in his honor (Spencer)
- John Poindexter, vice admiral, U.S. Navy, National Security Adviser to President Ronald Reagan, figure in the Iran-Contra affair (Odon)
- David M. Shoup, Medal of Honor recipient, 22nd commandant of the Marine Corps (Battle Ground)
- Walter Bedell Smith, general, U.S. Army, chief of staff to General Dwight D. Eisenhower (Indianapolis)
- Raymond Ames Spruance, admiral, U.S. Navy, Flagship Commander USS Indianapolis (Indianapolis)
- Lew Wallace, general in the Civil War (Crawfordsville)
- "Mad" Anthony Wayne, 18th-century United States general and namesake to Fort Wayne
- Samuel Woodfill, most decorated American soldier in World War I (Jefferson County)

== Politicians and activists ==
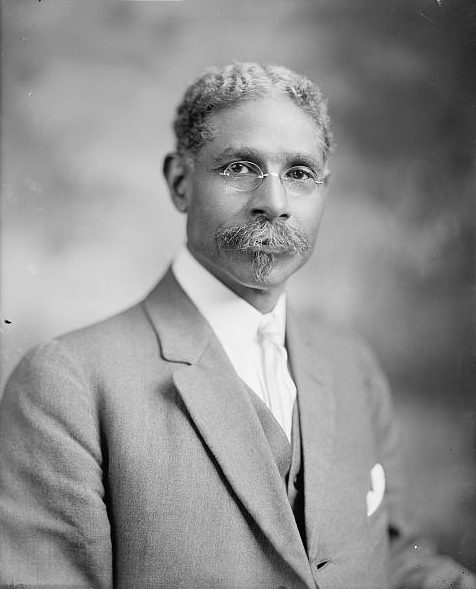
George Washington Buckner

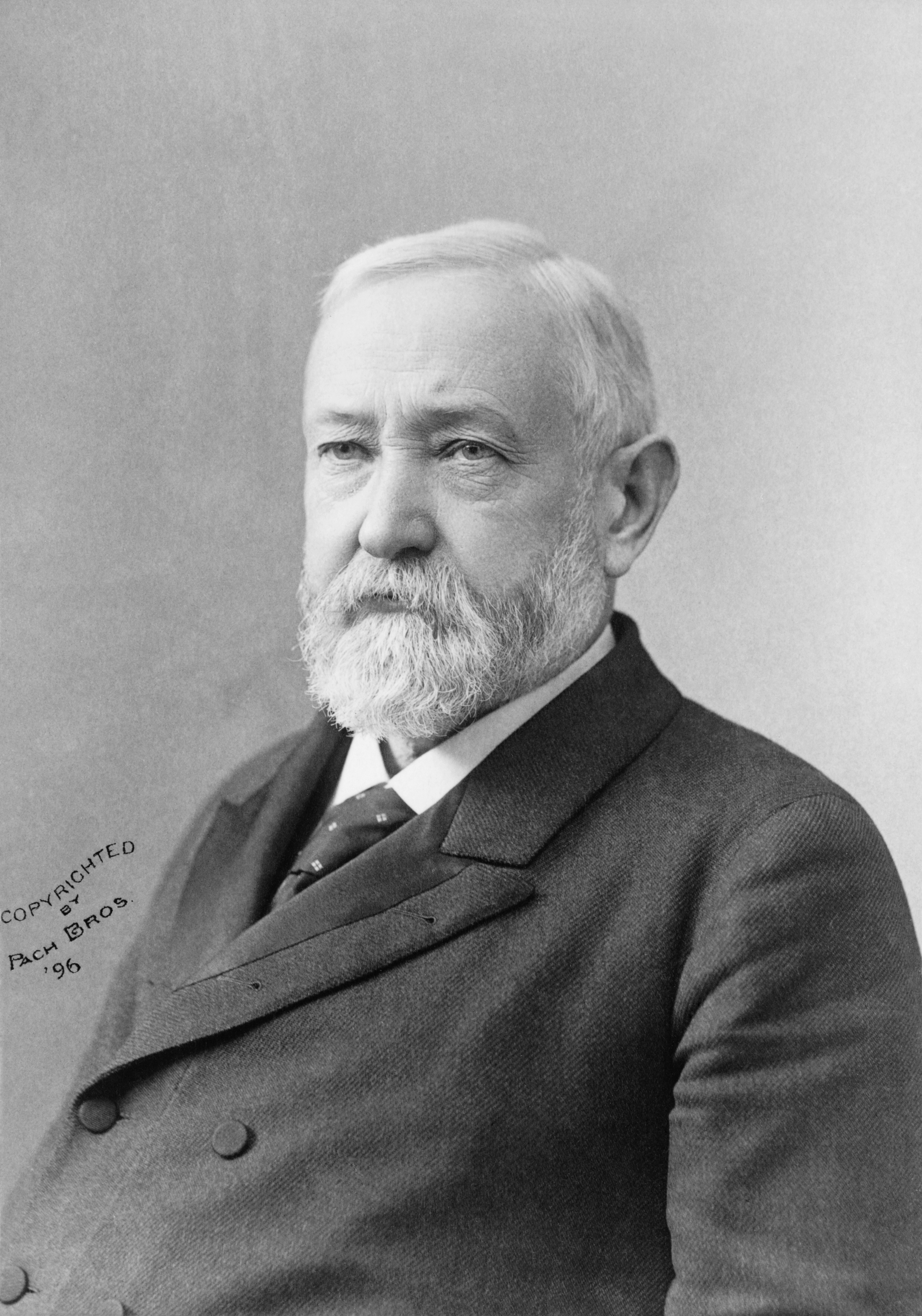
Benjamin Harrison

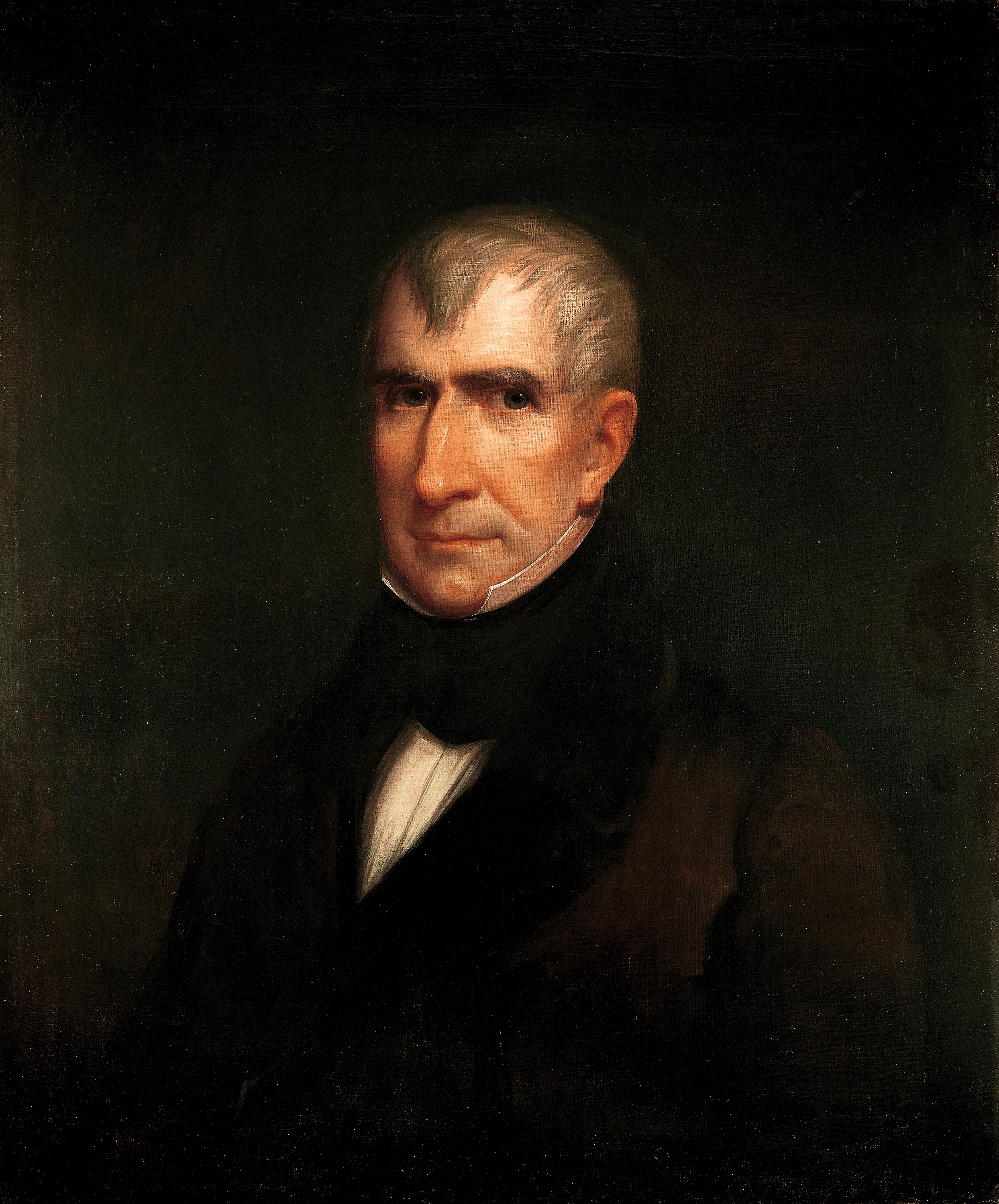
William Henry Harrison

Abraham Lincoln

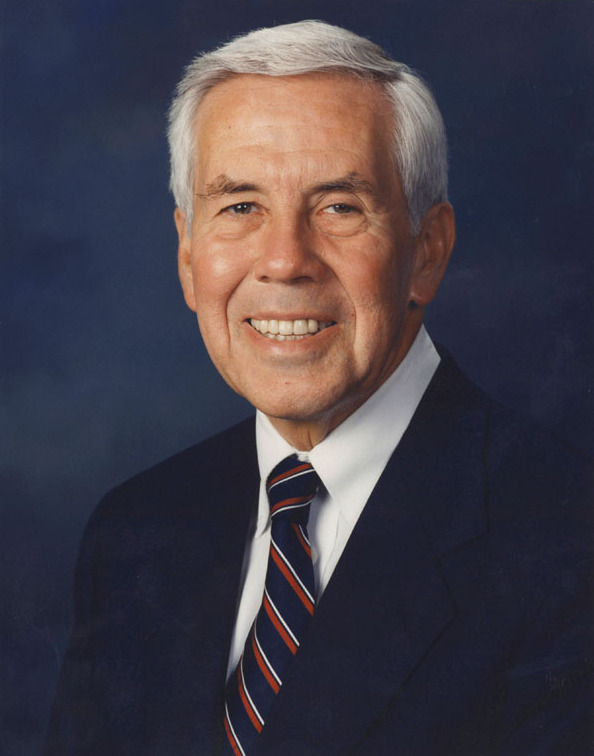
Richard Lugar

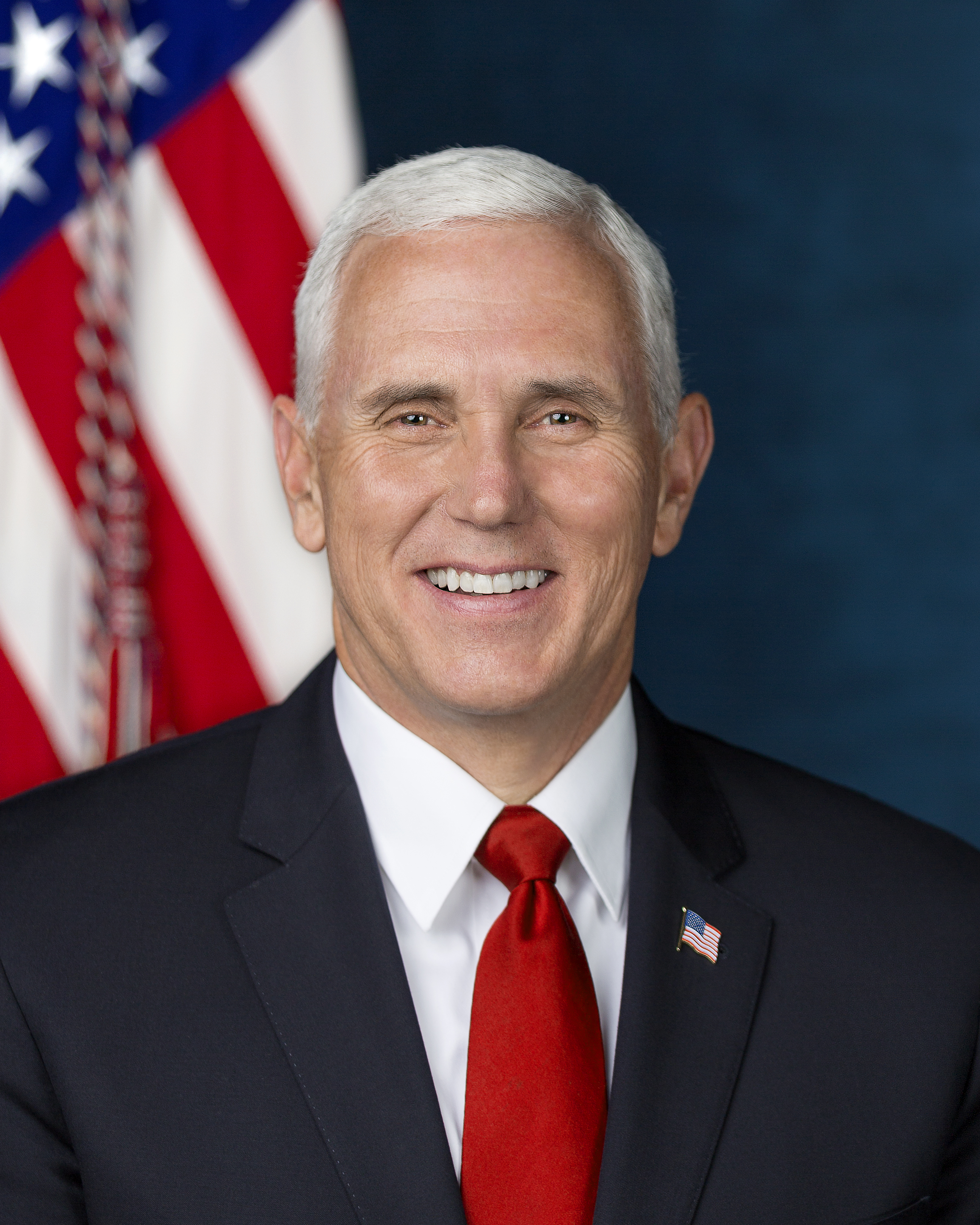
Mike Pence

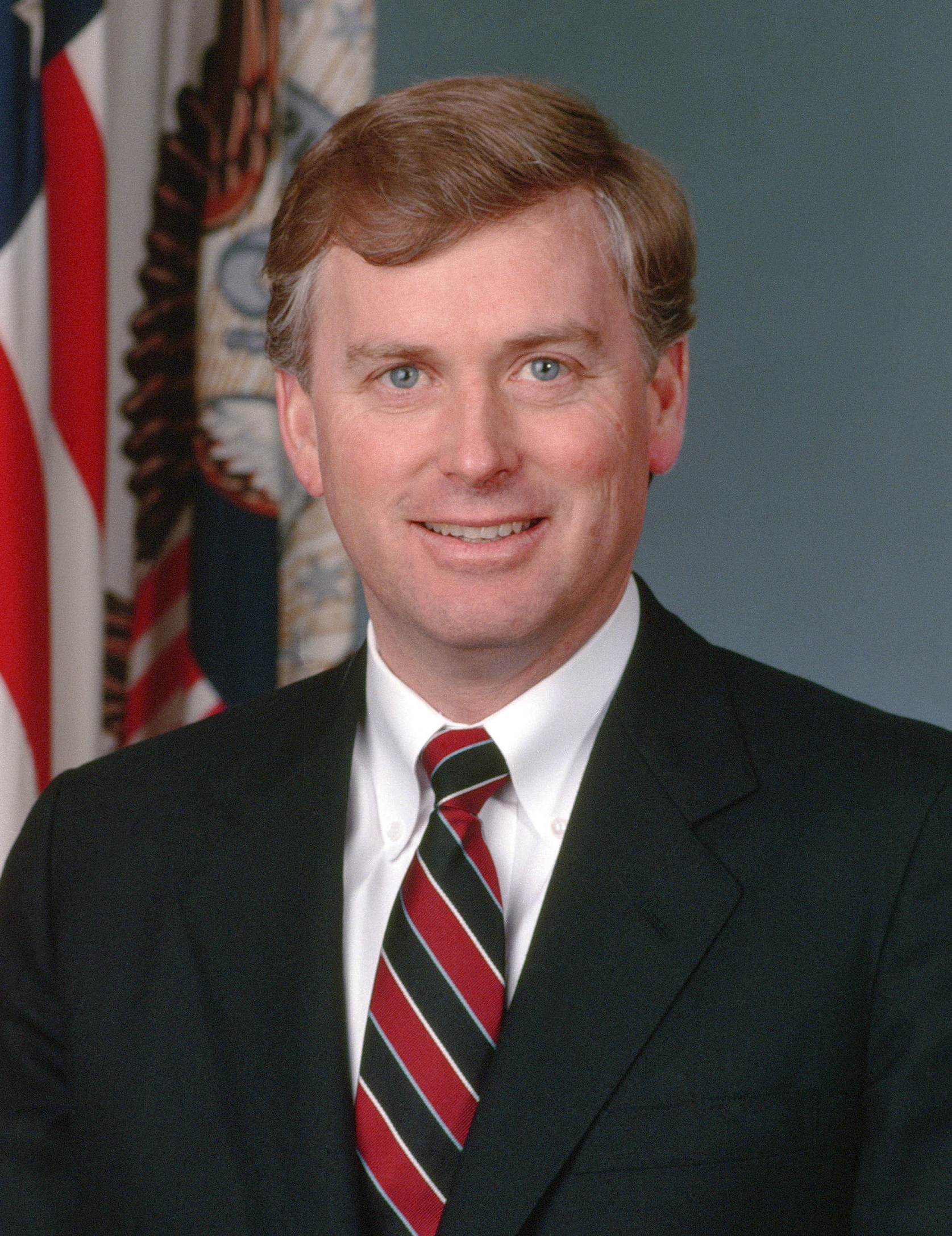
Dan Quayle

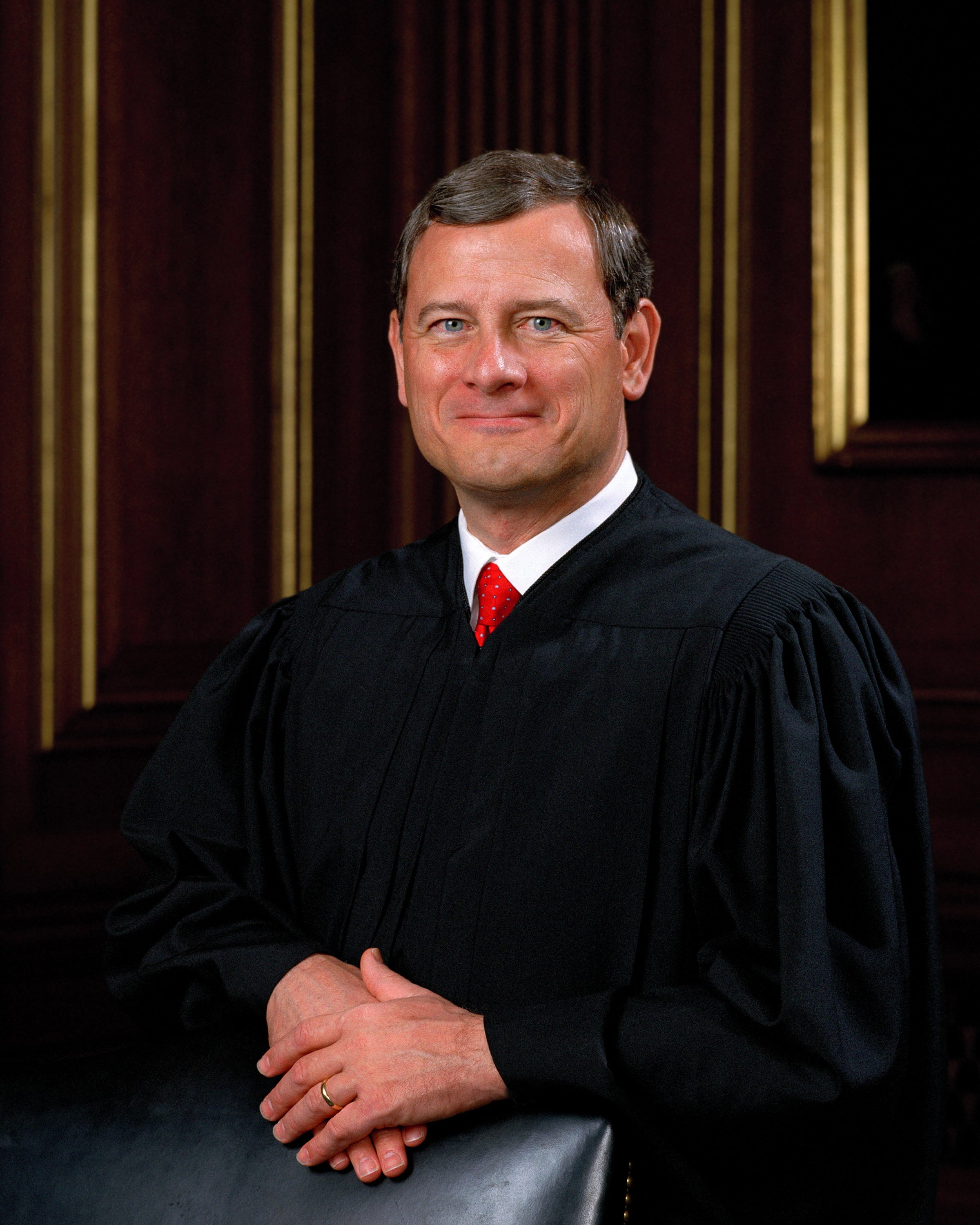
John G. Roberts

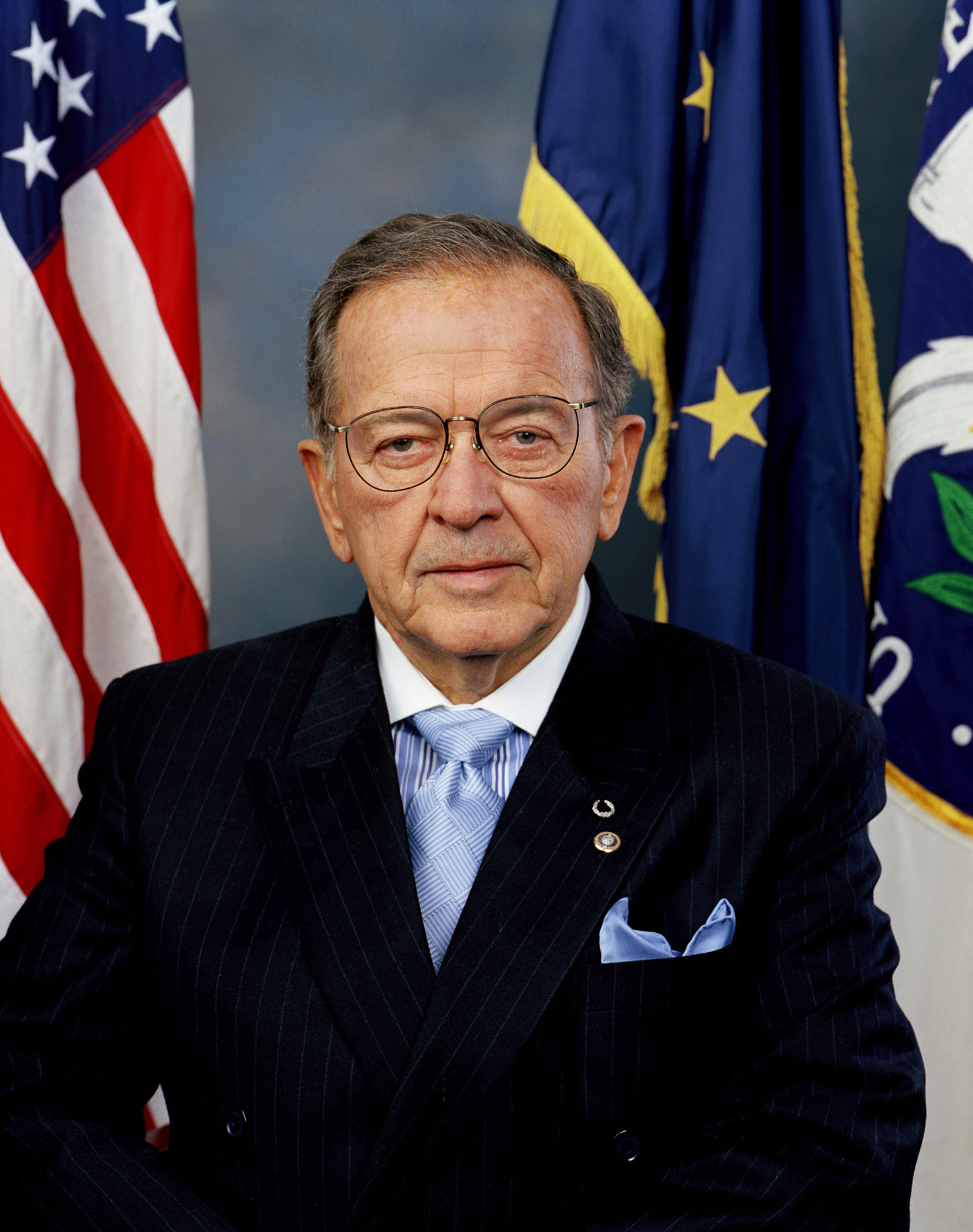
Ted Stevens

- Gardner Ackley, chairman of Council of Economic Advisers under Lyndon B. Johnson (Indianapolis)
- Frank J. Anderson, Marion County sheriff (Indianapolis)
- Amy Coney Barrett, U.S. Supreme Court justice (South Bend)
- Birch Bayh, former U.S. senator and presidential candidate (Terre Haute)
- Evan Bayh, U.S. senator and former governor of Indiana (Shirkieville)
- Albert J. Beveridge, U.S. senator of Indiana (Indianapolis)
- Otis R. Bowen, governor of Indiana and U.S. secretary of Health and Human Services
- Roger D. Branigin, governor of Indiana and 1968 candidate for president (Franklin)
- Jesse D. Bright, U.S. senator and president pro tempore of the Senate (Madison)
- George Washington Buckner, U.S. minister to Liberia, 1913–1915 (Evansville)
- Pete Buttigieg, U.S. secretary of transportation, mayor of South Bend, and candidate in the 2020 Democratic Party presidential primaries
- Earl Butz, U.S. secretary of agriculture (Albion)
- Maria Cantwell, U.S. congresswoman and U.S. senator (Indianapolis)
- Homer E. Capehart, businessman and U.S. senator (Algiers)
- Joseph Clancy, director of the United States Secret Service under President Barack Obama (Elwood)
- James Clapper, director of National Intelligence under President Barack Obama (Fort Wayne)
- Benjamin V. Cohen, a key figure in the administrations of presidents Franklin D. Roosevelt and Harry S. Truman (Muncie)
- Schuyler Colfax, U.S. congressman and speaker of the House of Representatives, U.S. vice president (South Bend)
- George N. Craig, governor of Indiana, national commander of American Legion (Brazil)
- Gonzalo P. Curiel, U.S. district judge (East Chicago)
- John Wesley Davis, U.S. congressman and speaker of the House of Representatives (Carlisle)
- Eugene V. Debs, labor and political leader (Terre Haute)
- William Hayden English, U.S. congressman and vice presidential candidate (Lexington)
- Charles W. Fairbanks, U.S. senator and vice president of the United States (Indianapolis)
- John W. Foster, U.S. secretary of state (Evansville)
- Nora Trueblood Gause (1851–1955), humanitarian (Kokomo)
- Walter Q. Gresham, U.S. secretary of the treasury, postmaster general, secretary of state (Lanesville)
- Marc L. Griffin, youngest judge, at age 17 (Greenwood)
- Charles A. Halleck, U.S. congressman (Rensselaer)
- Lee H. Hamilton, U.S. congressman (Bloomington)
- Clifford Hardin, U.S. secretary of agriculture (Knightstown)
- Benjamin Harrison, 23rd president of the United States
- William Henry Harrison, 9th president of the United States and governor of Indiana Territory
- Richard Hatcher, Gary mayor (Gary)
- John Hay, U.S. secretary of state (Salem)
- Will H. Hays, U.S. postmaster general (Sullivan)
- Thomas A. Hendricks, U.S. senator and vice president (Indianapolis)
- Agnes Hitt (1845–1919), national president of the Woman's Relief Corps (Greencastle)
- Louis McHenry Howe, close political advisor to President Franklin Delano Roosevelt (Indianapolis)
- Jonathan Jennings, first congressional representative from the Indiana Territory and early abolitionist (Charlestown)
- Cleve Jones, gay/human rights activist, created the NAMES Project AIDS Memorial Quilt (West Lafayette)
- Jane L. Kelly, U.S. circuit judge of the U.S. Court of Appeals for the Eighth Circuit (Greencastle)
- Michael C. Kerr, U.S. congressman and speaker of the House of Representatives (New Albany)
- Ron Klain, chief of staff to Vice President Joe Biden (Indianapolis)
- Abraham Lincoln, 16th president of the United States, lived in Indiana age 7–21 (Spencer County)
- Richard Lugar, U.S. senator and former mayor of Indianapolis (Indianapolis)
- Thomas R. Marshall, U.S. vice president (North Manchester)
- Mack F. Mattingly, U.S. senator from Georgia, asst. sec genl. NATO, US ambassador
- Edward Ralph May, only delegate to the Indiana Constitutional Convention of 1850 to support African American suffrage (Angola)
- Hugh McCulloch, U.S. secretary of the treasury (Fort Wayne)
- Bob McDonald, U.S. secretary of veterans affairs (Gary)
- William H.H. Miller, U.S. attorney general (Indianapolis)
- Sherman Minton, U.S. senator and Supreme Court justice
- Joy Morrissey, British MP for Beaconsfield
- Oliver P. Morton, governor of Indiana (Centerville)
- Harry S. New, U.S. postmaster general (Indianapolis)
- Mike Pence, former congressman, former governor of Indiana, 2013–2017, and 48th vice president of the United States under Donald Trump (Columbus)
- Dennis Pennington, state senator and early abolitionist (Central Barren)
- Bart Peterson, former mayor of Indianapolis (Indianapolis)
- John Poindexter, national security advisor under President Ronald Reagan (Washington)
- John Wesley Posey, abolitionist (Petersburg)
- George H. Proffit, member of the U.S. House of Representatives Indiana's 1st district, United States Ambassador to Brazil (Petersburg)
- Dan Quayle, former U.S. senator from Indiana (1981–1989) and 44th vice president of the United States under George HW Bush (Huntington and Indianapolis)
- John Rarick, former U.S. representative from Louisiana
- Alice Rivlin, director of the White House Office of Management and Budget, Vice Chair of the Federal Reserve (Bloomington)
- John Roberts, U.S. Supreme Court chief justice (Long Beach)
- William Ruckelshaus, former U.S. director of the F.B.I. and Deputy Attorney General
- Caleb Blood Smith, U.S. secretary of the interior (Indianapolis)
- Louis E. Sola, commissioner of the U.S. Federal Maritime Commission (Goodland)
- William L. Springer, U.S. congressman (Sullivan)
- Ted Stevens, U.S. senator from Alaska (Indianapolis)
- Richard Fred Suhrheinrich, senior U.S. circuit judge of the U.S. Court of Appeals for the Sixth Circuit (Lincoln City)
- Benjamin Franklin Trueblood (1847–1916), pacifist who served the American Peace Society for 23 years
- John Palmer Usher, U.S. secretary of the interior (Terre Haute)
- Willis Van Devanter, associate justice of the United States Supreme Court, 1911–1937 (Marion)
- Culla Johnson Vayhinger (1867–1924), temperance reformer, educator, religious and political leader
- Mark Warner, current U.S. senator for Virginia, former governor of Virginia (Indianapolis)
- Gary Webb, journalist (Indianapolis)
- Ryan White, AIDS activist (Kokomo)
- Claude R. Wickard, U.S. secretary of agriculture (Camden)
- Wendell Willkie, 1940 Republican presidential nominee (Elwood)

== Native American leaders ==
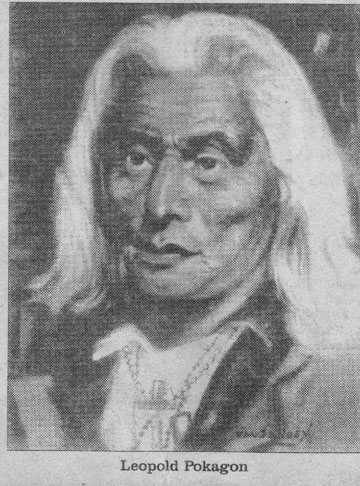
Leopold Pokagon

- Little Turtle, Miami chief, leader of Native American forces in the Battle of the Wabash, the most decisive American Indian victory of the Indian Wars
- Metea, Potawatomi chief from northeast Indiana
- Pacanne, influential Miami chief and businessman
- Leopold Pokagon, Potawatomi chief for whom Pokagon State Park is named
- Simon Pokagon, Potawatomi chief, author, son of Leopold
- Young Tobacco, Piankeshaw chief who supported the United States in the American Revolution

== Entertainment ==
=== Film and theatre ===
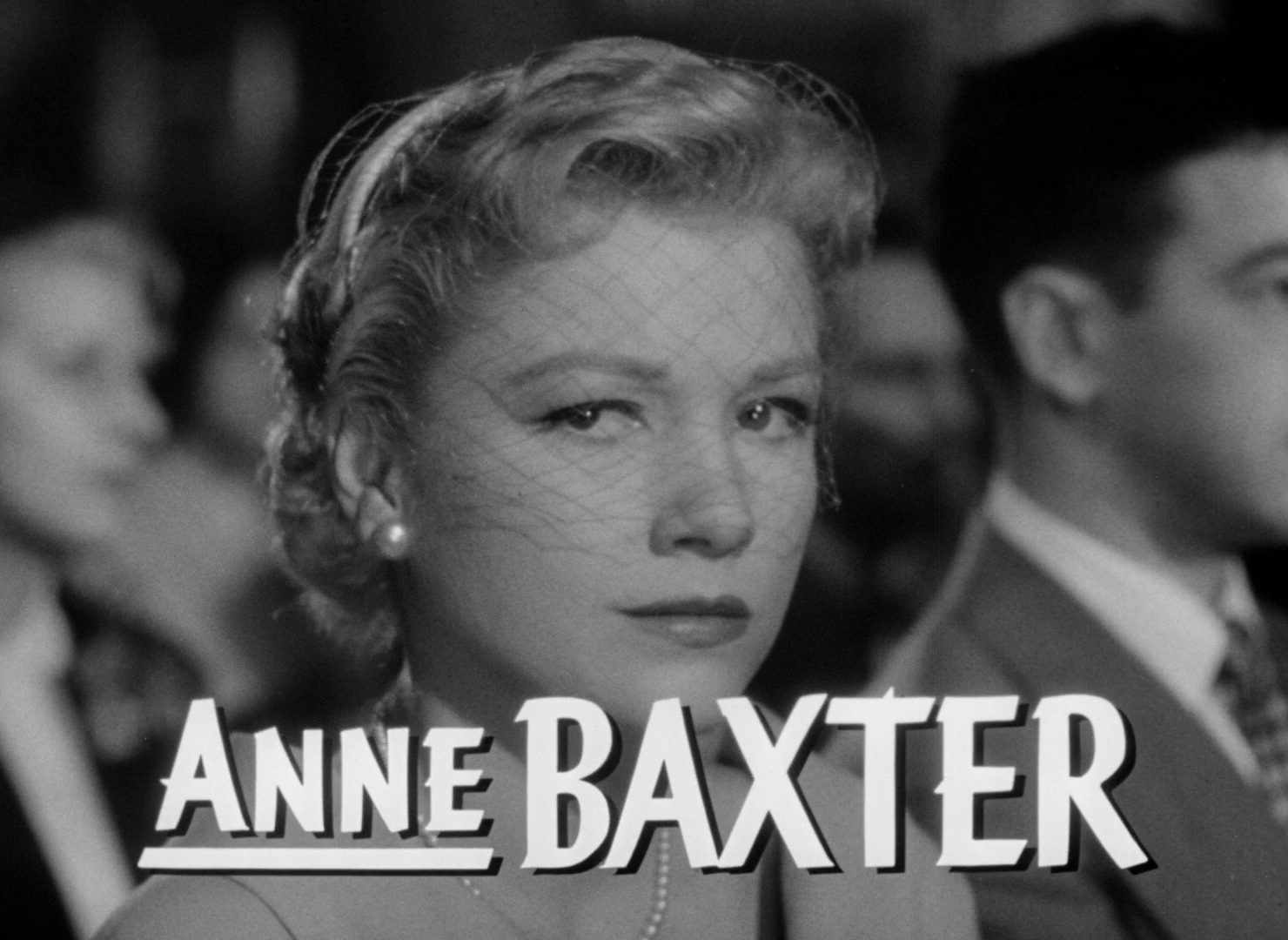
Anne Baxter

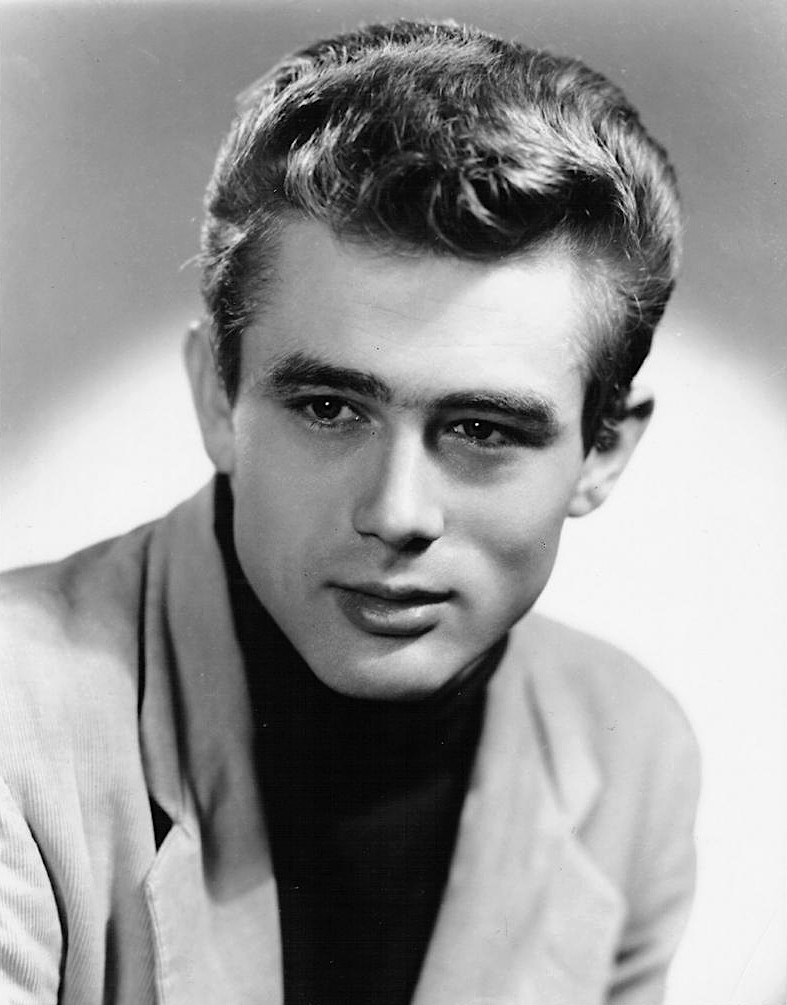
James Dean

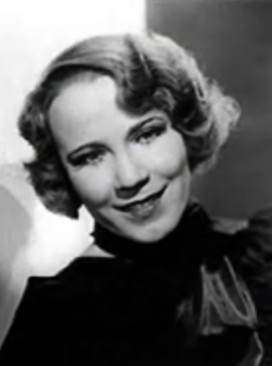
Louise Fazenda

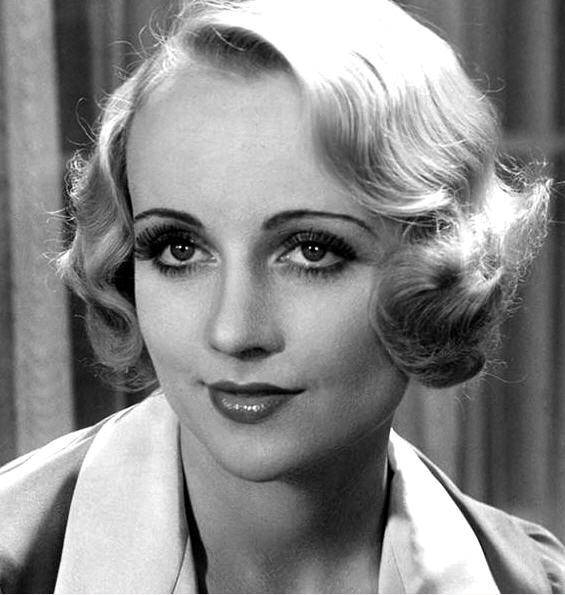
Carole Lombard

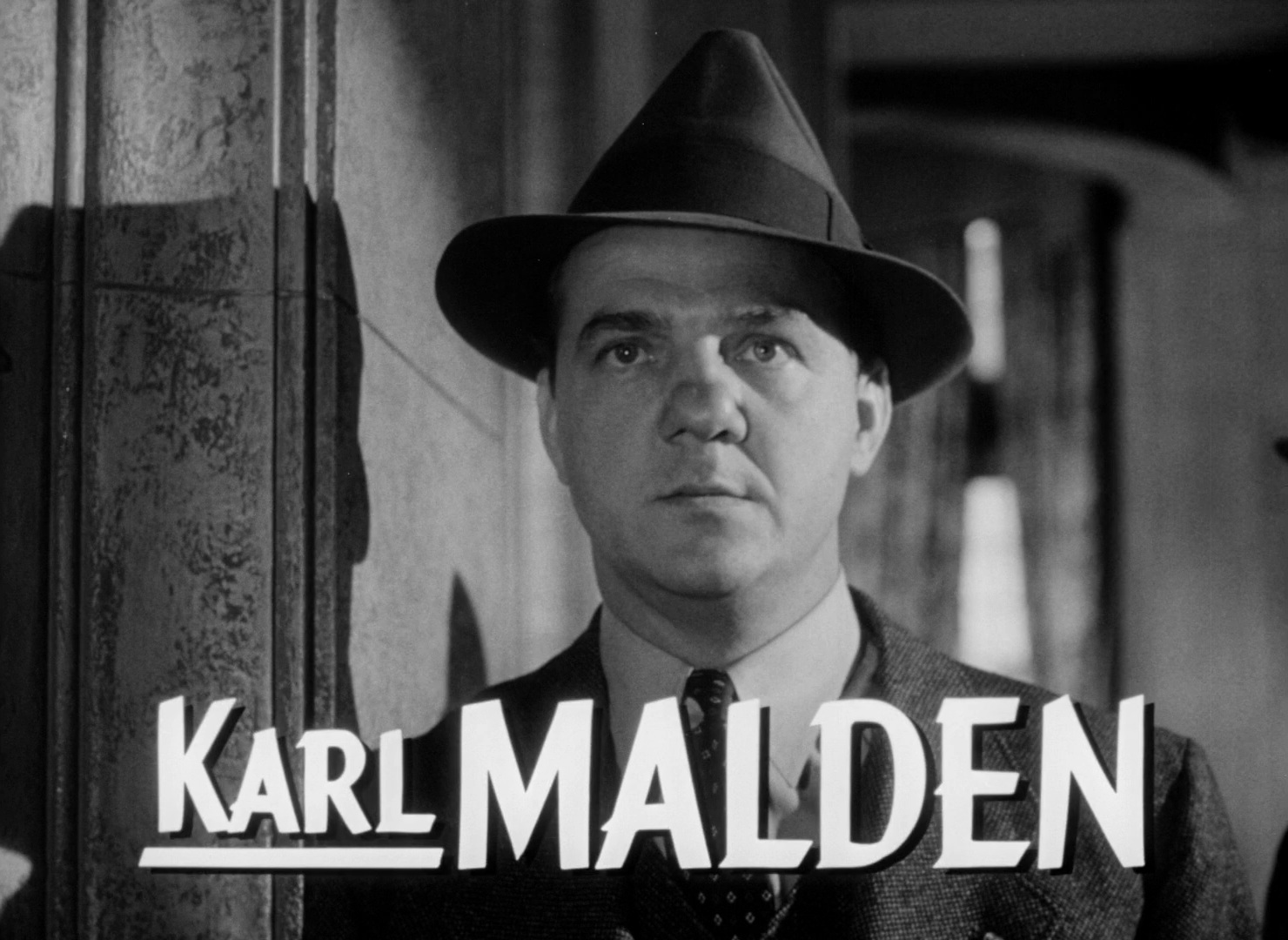
Karl Malden

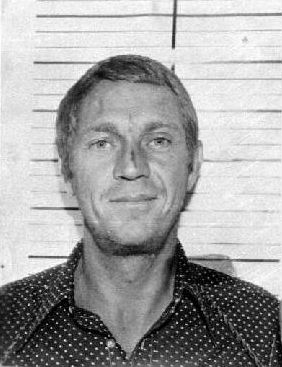
Steve McQueen

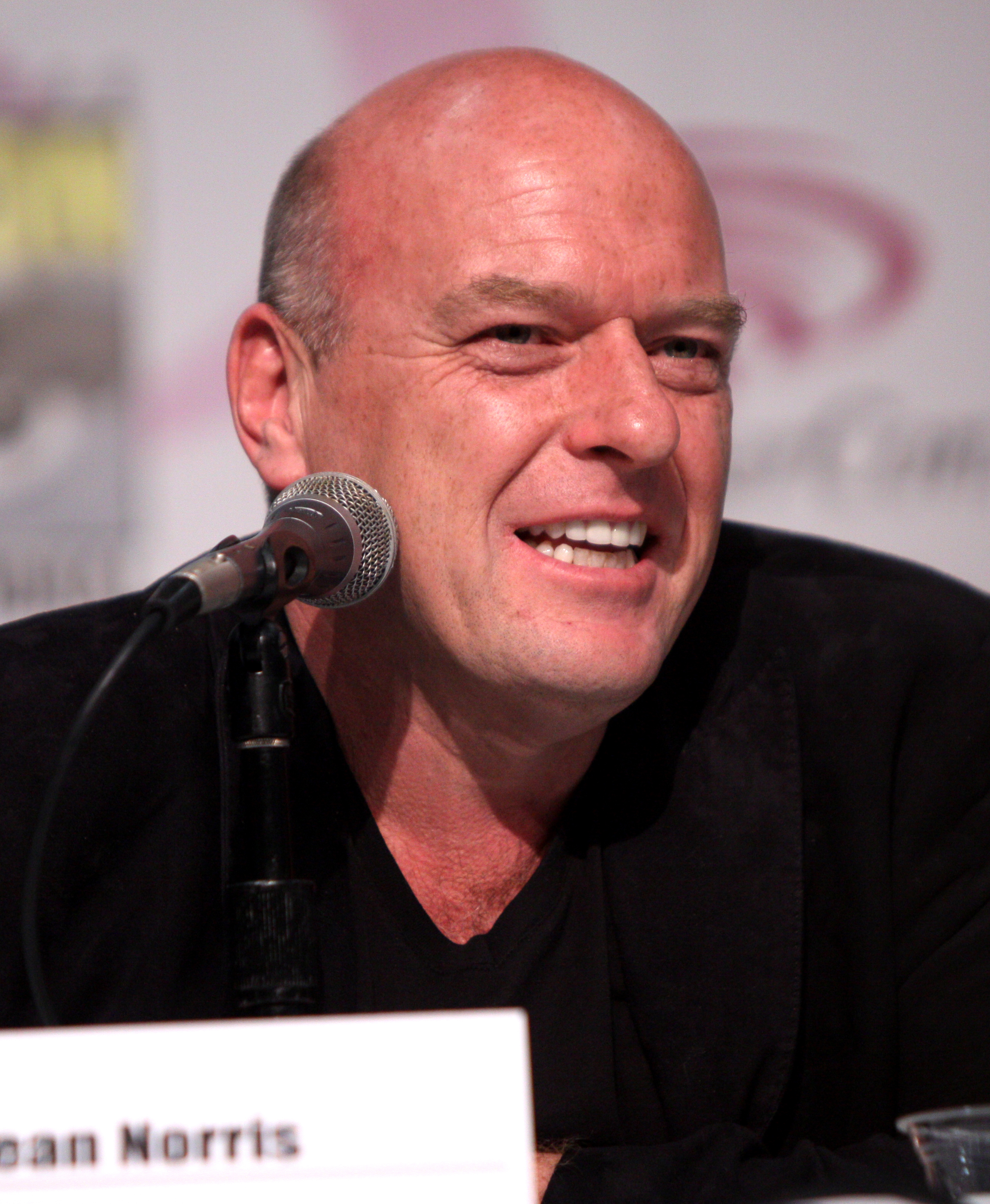
Dean Norris

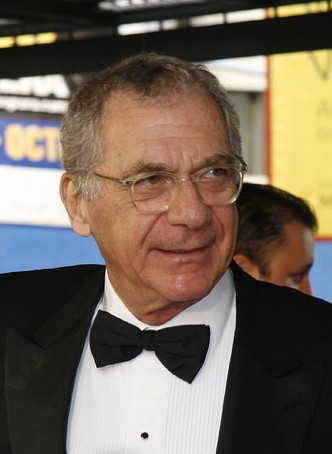
Sydney Pollack

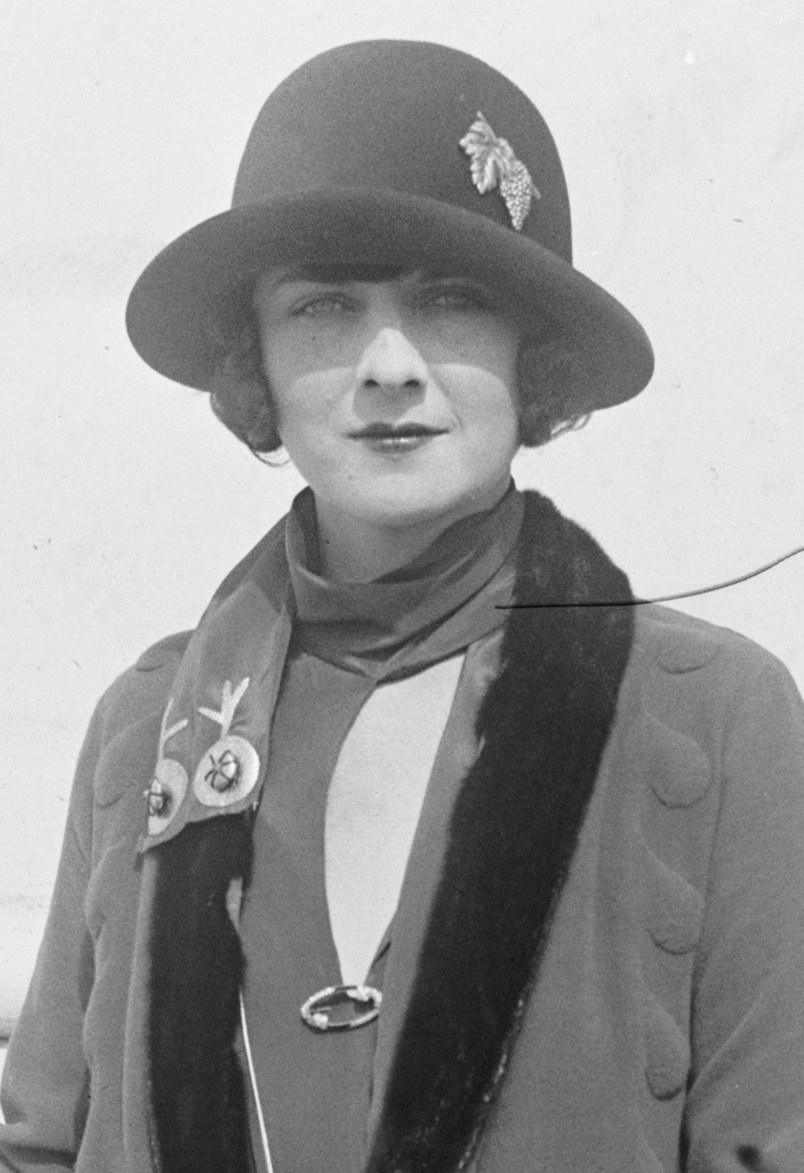
Alice Terry

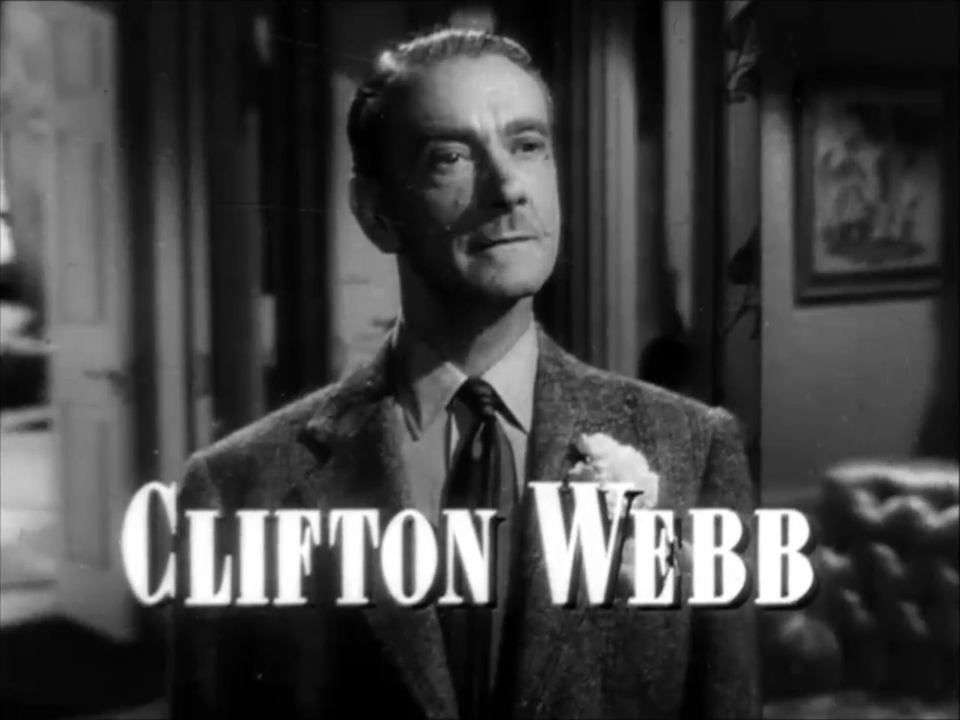
Clifton Webb

- Lillian Albertson, actress, producer (Noblesville)
- Leon Ames, actor (Portland)
- David Anspaugh, director (Decatur)
- Arija Bareikis, actress (Bloomington)
- Rhonda Bates, actress (Evansville)
- Anne Baxter, actress (Michigan City)
- Billie Bennett, actress (Evansville)
- Abraham Benrubi, actor (Bloomington)
- Richard Bergman, actor (Plymouth)
- James Best, actor (Corydon)
- Monte Blue, actor (Indianapolis)
- Beulah Bondi, actress (Valparaiso)
- John Bowers, actor (Garrett)
- Avery Brooks, actor (Evansville)
- Ezra Buzzington, actor (Muncie)
- David Canary, actor (Elwood)
- James Carew, actor (Goshen)
- Ann Christy, actress (Logansport)
- Embeth Davidtz, actress (Lafayette)
- Johnny "Scat" Davis, actor, band leader (Brazil)
- James Dean, actor (Fairmount)
- Louise Dresser, actress (Evansville)
- Adam Driver, actor (Mishawaka)
- Ger Duany, actor (Bloomington)
- Irene Dunne, actress (Madison)
- Kenneth "Babyface" Edmonds, singer, songwriter, actor, film producer (Indianapolis)
- Chad Everett, actor (South Bend)
- Louise Fazenda, actress (Lafayette)
- Jenna Fischer, actress (Fort Wayne)
- Rhett Fisher, actor and musician (Indianapolis)
- Ken Foree, actor (Indianapolis)
- Vivica A. Fox, actress (Indianapolis)
- Brendan Fraser, actor (Indianapolis)
- Dolores Fuller, actress (South Bend)
- Ron Glass, actor (Evansville)
- Maude Turner Gordon, actress (Franklin)
- Sid Grauman, impresario (Indianapolis)
- Phil Harris, actor (Linton)
- Heather Headley, actress, singer (Fort Wayne)
- Ann Hovey, actress (Mt. Vernon)
- Chase Infiniti, actress (Indianapolis)
- Doug Jones, actor (Indianapolis)
- Ken Kercheval, actor (Wolcottville)
- Anita King, actress (Michigan City)
- Greg Kinnear, actor (Logansport)
- Elmo Lincoln, actor (Rochester)
- Sarah Litzsinger, actress (Indianapolis)
- Jake Lloyd, actor (Carmel)
- Carole Lombard, actress (Fort Wayne)
- Shelley Long, actress (Fort Wayne)
- Marjorie Main, actress (Acton)
- Karl Malden, actor (Gary)
- Strother Martin, actor (Kokomo)
- John McMartin, actor (Warsaw)
- Steve McQueen, actor (Beech Grove and Indianapolis)
- Jack Mercer, voice actor (Worthington)
- Michael Michele, actress (Evansville)
- Marilyn Miller, actress, dancer (Evansville)
- Keith Alan Morris, director, screenwriter (South Bend)
- Ryan Murphy, writer, director (Indianapolis)
- Dean Norris, actor (South Bend)
- Katy O'Brian, actress (Indianapolis)
- Tommy O'Haver, director, screenwriter (Carmel)
- Betsy Palmer, actress (East Chicago)
- James Pierce, actor (Freedom)
- Angelo Pizzo, screenwriter (Bloomington)
- Sydney Pollack, actor, producer, director (Lafayette)
- Victor Potel, actor (Lafayette)
- James Rebhorn, actor (Anderson)
- Michael Rosenbaum, actor (Newburgh)
- Robert Rusler, actor (Fort Wayne)
- George Seaton, film director (South Bend)
- Jake Short, actor (Indianapolis)
- Valeska Suratt, actress (Owensville)
- Max Terhune, actor (Anderson)
- Alice Terry, actress (Vincennes)
- Twyla Tharp, dancer (Portland)
- Forrest Tucker, actor (Plainfield)
- William Walker, actor (Pendleton)
- Clifton Webb, actor (Indianapolis)
- Dreya Weber, actress (Bloomington)
- Isiah Whitlock Jr., actor (South Bend)
- Fred Williamson, actor (Gary)
- Robert Wise, director (Winchester)
- Jo Anne Worley, actress (Lowell)
- Keke Wyatt, singer, actress (Indianapolis)
- Sasheer Zamata, comedian, actress (Indianapolis)

=== Comedians and humorists ===
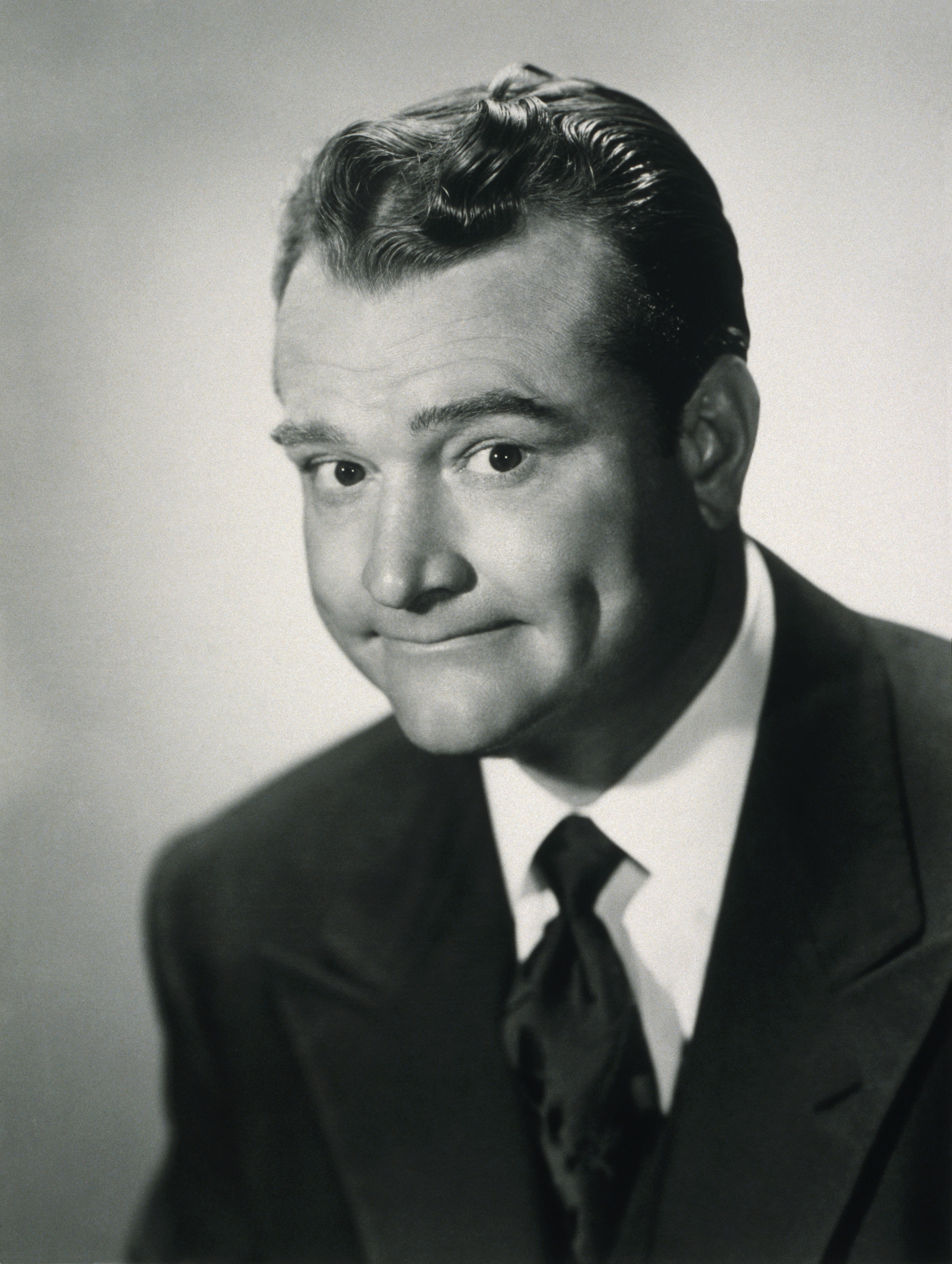
Red Skelton

- Mike Epps, comedian (Indianapolis)
- Michael Essany, comedian (Valparaiso)
- Jim Gaffigan, comedian (Chesterton)
- David Letterman, comedian, television personality, and former longtime host of The Late Show (Indianapolis)
- Buddy Lewis, comedian (Gary)
- Herb Shriner, comedian (Fort Wayne)
- Red Skelton, comedian (Vincennes)
- Brad Stine, comedian (Bremen)

=== Musicians ===
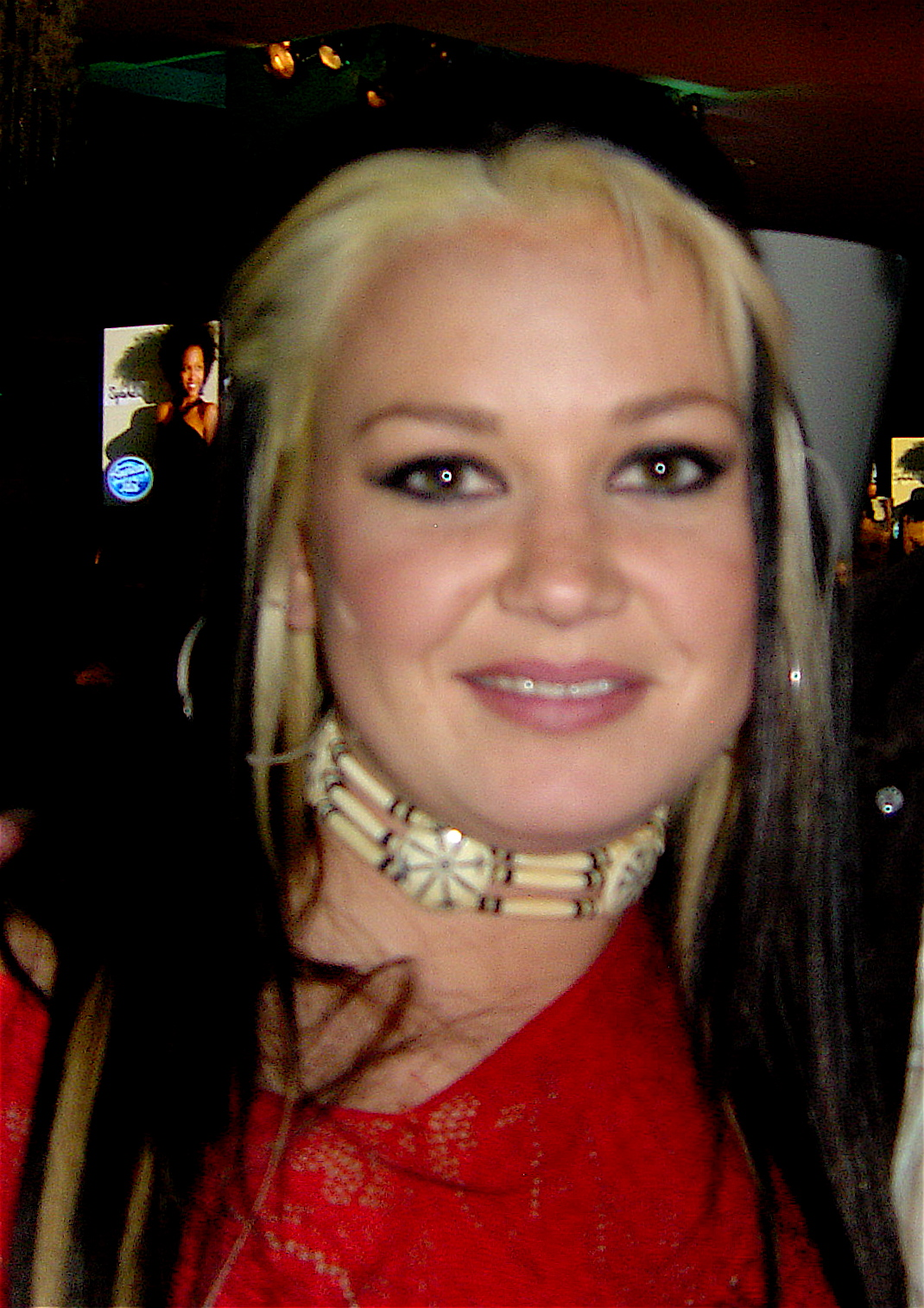
Amanda Overmyer

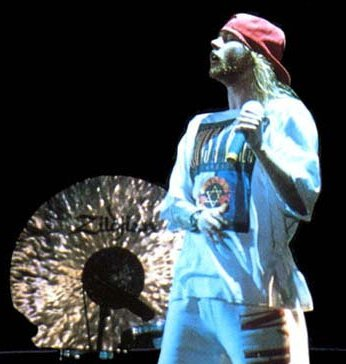
Axl Rose

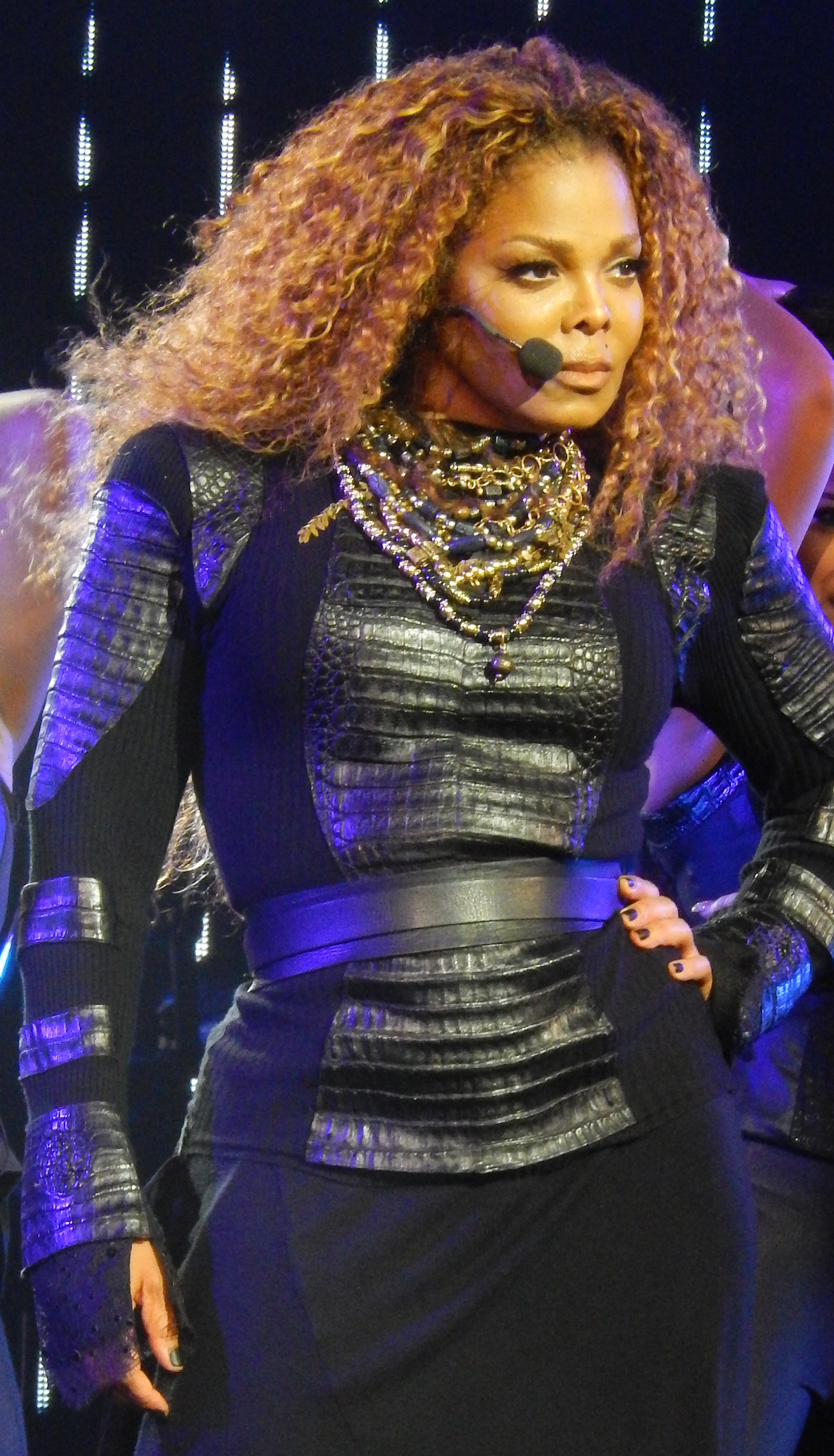
Janet Jackson

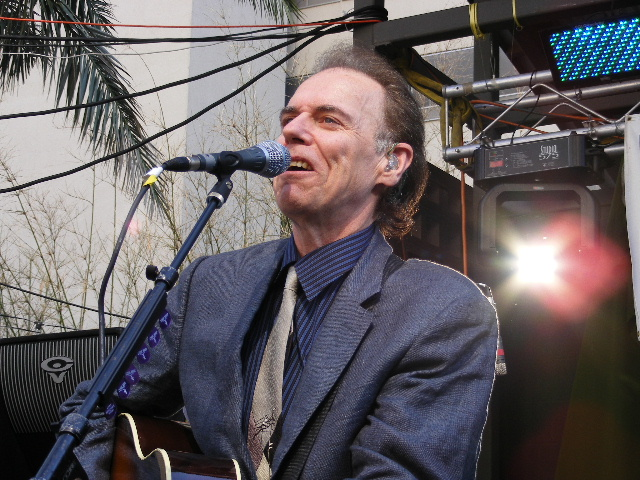
John Hiatt

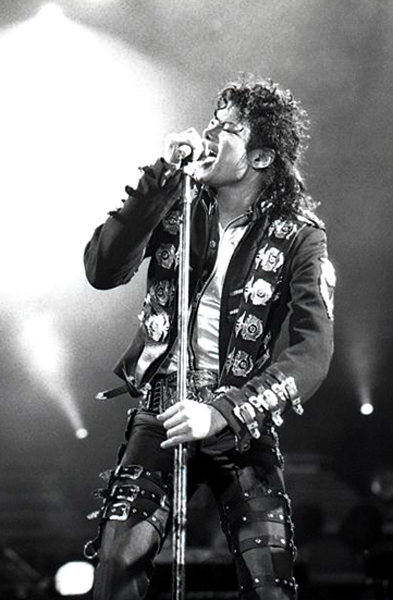
Michael Jackson

- Steve Allee, jazz musician and composer (Indianapolis)
- Omar Apollo, singer (Hobart)
- DJ Ashba, lead guitarist of Sixx:A.M. (Monticello)
- David Baker, jazz trombonist, author, educator (Indianapolis)
- Mark Battles, rapper, songwriter, producer (Indianapolis)
- Joshua Bell, violinist (Bloomington)
- Scrapper Blackwell, blues legend, writer of the earliest version of "Sweet Home Chicago" (Indianapolis)
- Angela Brown, opera singer, dramatic soprano (Indianapolis)
- Gary Burton, jazz vibraphone, composer, educator (Anderson)
- Jeremy Camp, singer (Lafayette)
- Royce Campbell, jazz guitarist, composer, producer (Seymour)
- Pete Candoli, trumpeter (Mishawaka)
- Hoagy Carmichael, songwriter (Bloomington)
- Leroy Carr, blues pianist, songwriter (Indianapolis)
- Randy Carr, singer-songwriter, producer (Columbus)
- Cal Collins, jazz guitarist (Medora)
- Eddie Condon, jazz banjoist, guitarist, bandleader (Goodland)
- Kyle Cook, Matchbox Twenty guitarist (Frankfort)
- Scatman Crothers, musician (Terre Haute)
- Eric Dill, singer-songwriter, musician, producer (Indianapolis)
- Paul Dresser, songwriter (Terre Haute)
- Kenneth "Babyface" Edmonds, singer, producer (Indianapolis)
- Joey Feek, country singer (Alexandria)
- Janie Fricke, singer (South Whitley)
- Bill Gaither, singer (Alexandria)
- Danny Gaither, gospel singer (Alexandria)
- Gloria Gaither, songwriter (Alexandria)
- Crystal Gayle, singer (Wabash)
- Lisa Germano, singer-songwriter and multi-instrumentalist (Mishawaka)
- Freddie Gibbs, rapper (Gary)
- Nathan Gunn, opera singer, baritone (South Bend)
- Jeff Hamilton, jazz drummer (Richmond)
- Slide Hampton, jazz trombonist, composer, arranger (Indianapolis)
- Krystal Harris, pianist, singer-songwriter (Anderson)
- Bobby Helms, singer (Bloomington)
- John Hiatt, singer-songwriter (Indianapolis)
- Shannon Hoon, founding member and original lead vocalist of the band Blind Melon (Lafayette)
- Freddie Hubbard, jazz trumpeter, composer (Indianapolis)
- Janet Jackson, singer, dancer, songwriter (Gary)
- Jermaine Jackson, singer (Gary)
- La Toya Jackson, singer-songwriter, musician (Gary)
- Michael Jackson, singer-songwriter (Gary)
- Randy Jackson, singer (Gary)
- Tito Jackson, singer (Gary)
- Jane Jarvis, jazz pianist (Vincennes)
- Fred Jewell, composer (Worthington)
- JJ Johnson, jazz trombonist, composer (Indianapolis)
- David Katz, conductor who founded the Queens Symphony Orchestra
- Josh Kaufman, singer, contestant on Season 6 of NBC's The Voice (Indianapolis)
- Sylvia Jane Kirby, singer (Kokomo)
- Adam Lambert, singer-songwriter, American Idol runner-up (Indianapolis)
- Mick Mars (real name Robert Deal), Mötley Crüe lead guitarist (Terre Haute)
- Kym Mazelle, singer (Gary)
- Ryan McCombs, singer (Dunkirk)
- Jon McLaughlin, singer-songwriter (Anderson)
- John Mellencamp, singer-songwriter, musician (Seymour)
- Marilyn Miller, singer and dancer (Evansville)
- Buddy Montgomery, jazz pianist (Indianapolis)
- Monk Montgomery, jazz bassist (Indianapolis)
- Wes Montgomery, jazz guitarist (Indianapolis)
- Rich Mullins, Christian contemporary artist (Richmond)
- Ken Navarro, jazz guitarist (Lafayette)
- Amanda Overmyer, singer, American Idol Season 7 finalist (Camden)
- The Panderers, rock band
- Amanda Perez, R&B artist, singer, songwriter, producer (Fort Wayne)
- Cole Porter, songwriter (Peru)
- Melvin Rhyne, jazz organist (Indianapolis)
- Larry Ridley, jazz bassist and educator (Indianapolis)
- Dax Riggs, singer-songwriter, Acid Bath (Evansville)
- Dexter Romweber, rockabilly/roots rock musician (Batesville)
- Ned Rorem, composer (Richmond)
- Axl Rose, Guns N' Roses singer (Lafayette)
- David Lee Roth, Van Halen singer (Bloomington)
- Jon Schaffer, Iced Earth guitarist (Franklin)
- Noble Sissle, jazz composer, lyricist, bandleader, singer (Indianapolis)
- Connie Smith, singer (Elkhart)
- Jeremy Spencer, drummer, Five Finger Death Punch (Oakland City)
- Izzy Stradlin, Guns N' Roses rhythm guitarist (Lafayette)
- Henry Lee Summer, singer (Brazil)
- Claude Thornhill, pianist, arranger, composer, bandleader (Terre Haute)
- Andy Timmons, guitarist, Danger Danger, Andy Timmons Band (Evansville)
- Leroy Vinnegar, jazz bassist (Indianapolis)
- John Von Ohlen, jazz drummer (Indianapolis)
- Steve Wariner, singer (Noblesville)
- Deniece Williams, singer (Gary)
- Keke Wyatt, singer, actress (Indianapolis)

=== Television ===
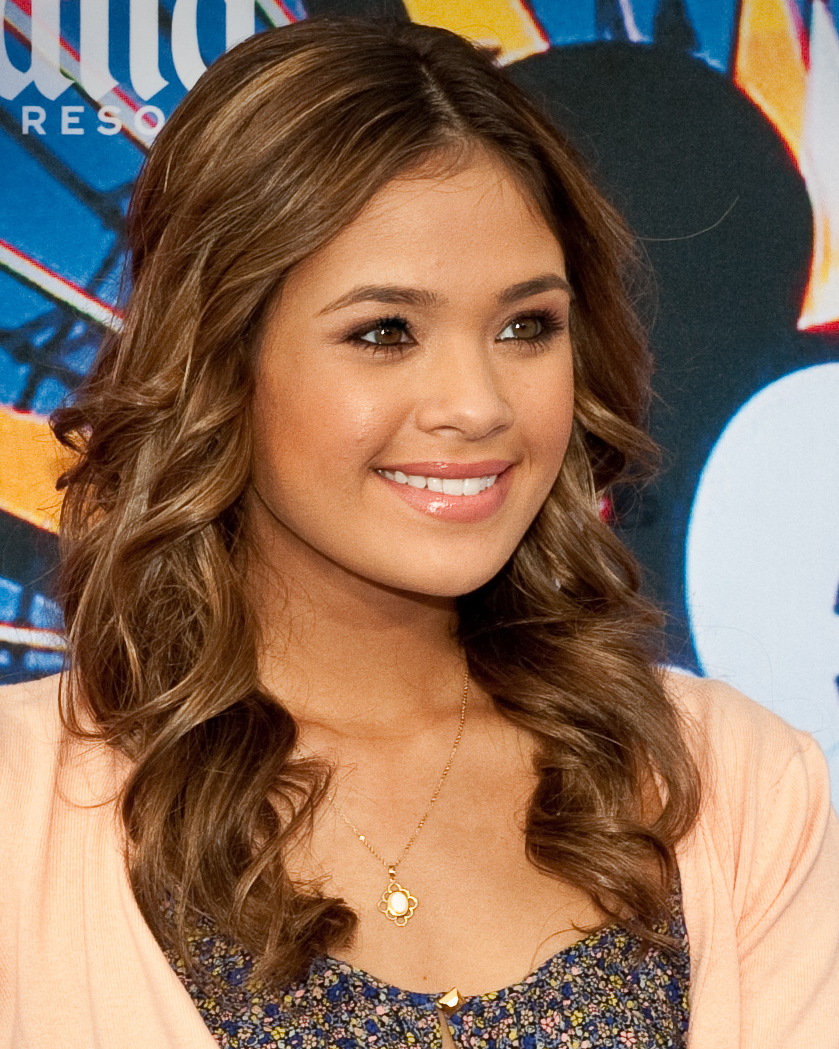
Nicole Gale Anderson

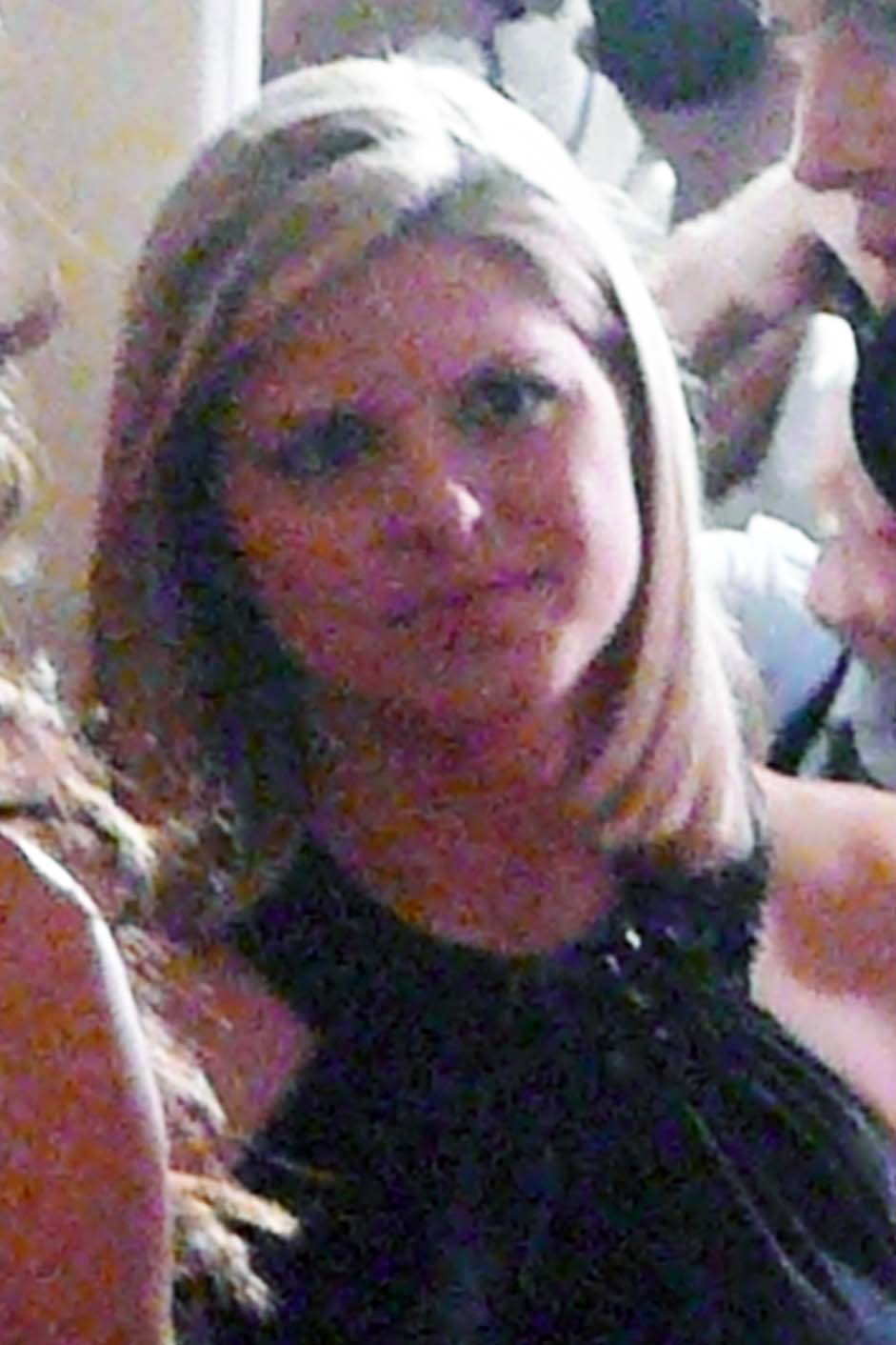
Kate Bolduan

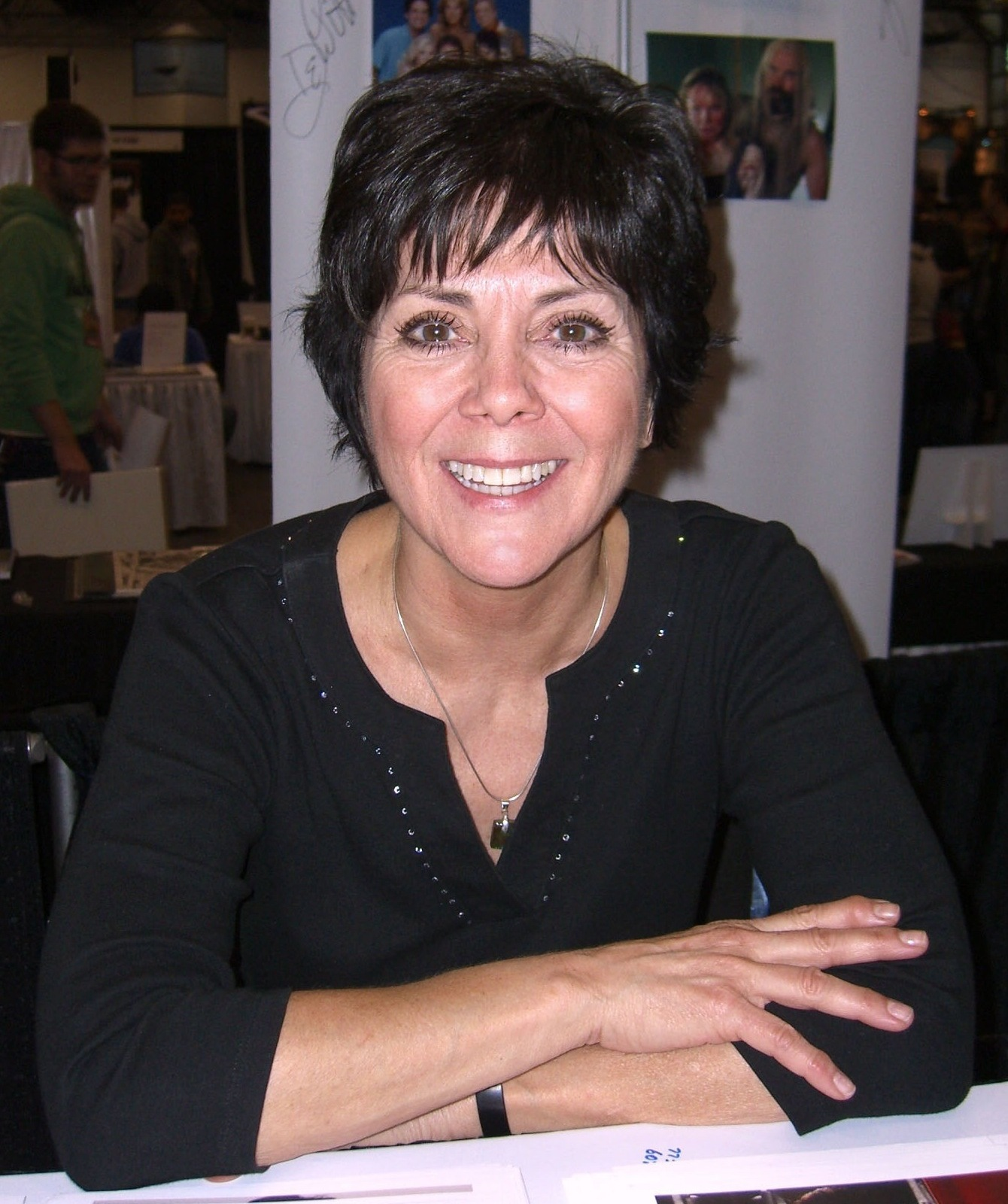
Joyce DeWitt

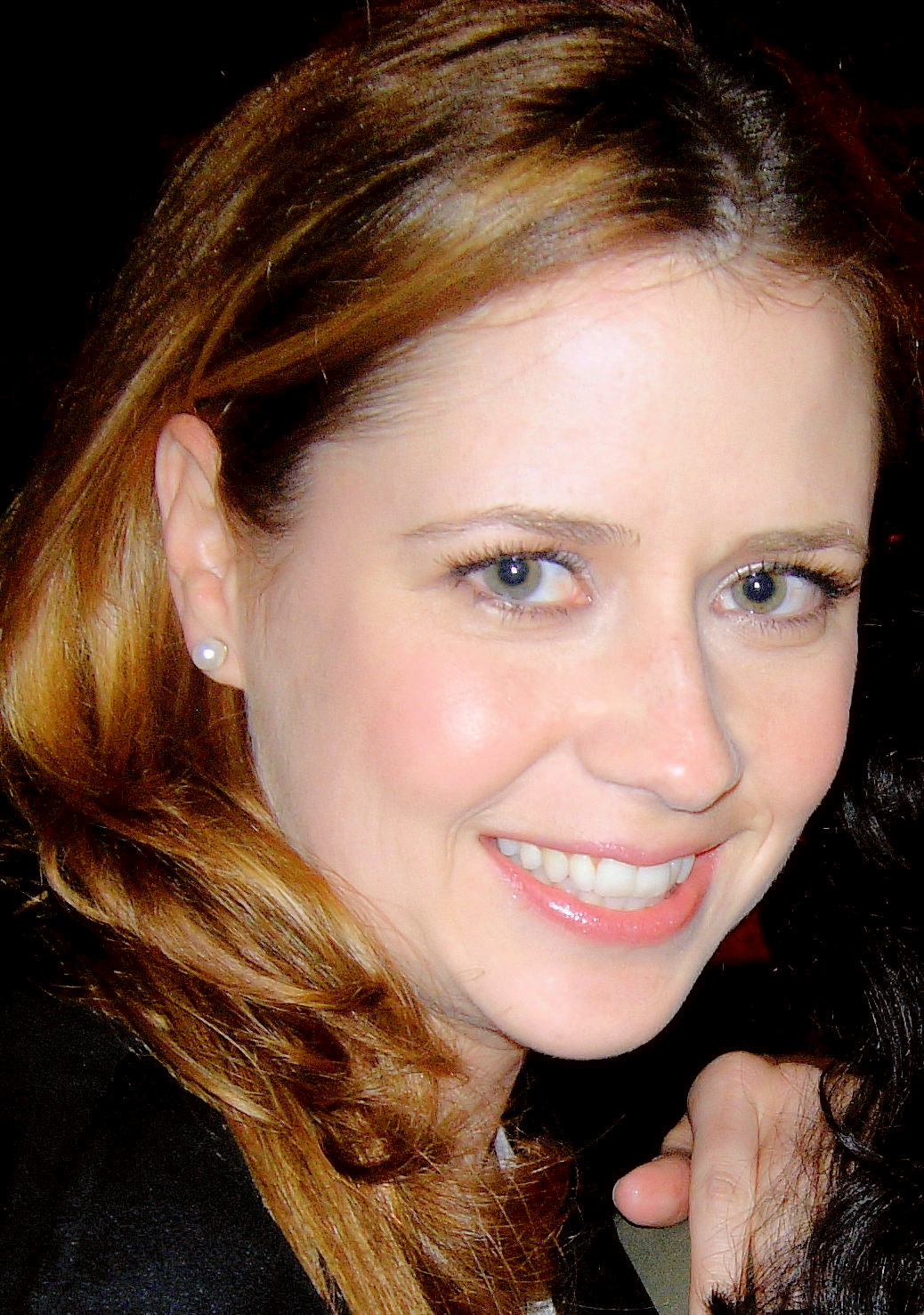
Jenna Fischer

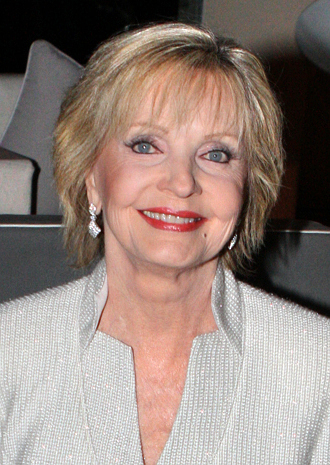
Florence Henderson

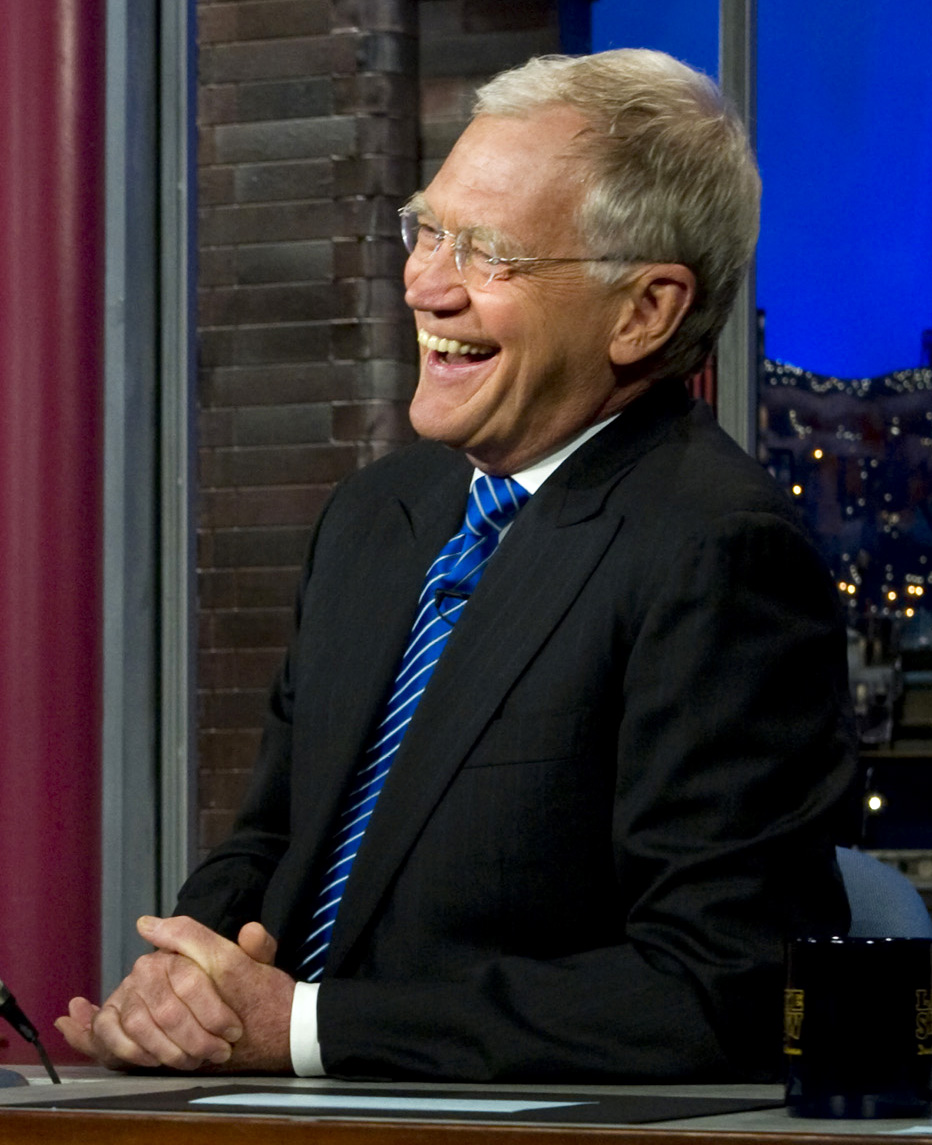
David Letterman

- Nicole Gale Anderson, actress (Rochester)
- Dee Bradley Baker, voice actor (Bloomington)
- Julia Barr, actor (Fort Wayne)
- James Best, actor (Corydon)
- Kate Bolduan, CNN anchor (Goshen)
- Kyle Bornheimer, actor (Mishawaka)
- John Bromfield, actor (South Bend)
- Avery Brooks, actor (Evansville)
- Dan Butler, actor (Fort Wayne)
- Jose Pablo Cantillo, actor (Terre Haute)
- Terri Conn, actress (Bloomington)
- Nancy Criss, producer, director (Elkhart)
- Mary Jane Croft, actress (Muncie)
- Scatman Crothers, actor (Terre Haute)
- Joyce DeWitt, actress (Speedway)
- Polly Draper, actress (Gary)
- Mike "Doc" Emrick, sportscaster (La Fontaine)
- Chad Everett, actor (South Bend)
- Bianca Ferguson, actress (Gary)
- Jenna Fischer, actress (Fort Wayne)
- Rick Fox, actor (Warsaw)
- Bill Frink, sportscaster (Elkhart)
- Dolores Fuller, actress (South Bend)
- Will Geer, actor (Frankfort)
- Ron Glass, actor (Evansville)
- Lloyd Haynes, actor (South Bend)
- Florence Henderson, actress (Dale)
- Drake Hogestyn, actor (Fort Wayne)
- Jamie Hyneman, MythBusters host (Columbus)
- Bob Jenkins, sports commentator (Liberty)
- Chubby Johnson, actor (Terre Haute)
- Anissa Jones, actress (West Lafayette)
- Kennedy, 1990s MTV VJ (Indianapolis)
- Adam Kennedy, actor, author, painter (Otterbein)
- Ken Kercheval, actor (Clinton)
- Brook Kerr, actress (Indianapolis)
- Michael King, Emmy Award-winning TV producer, political commentator (Gary)
- Durward Kirby, television personality, co-host of Candid Camera (Indianapolis)
- Steve Kroft, journalist and correspondent for 60 Minutes (Kokomo)
- Allan Lane, actor, voice of Mr. Ed (Mishawaka)
- David Letterman, television personality (Indianapolis)
- Shelley Long, actress (Fort Wayne)
- Karl Malden, actor (Gary)
- Claire Malis, actress (Gary)
- Patrick McVey, actor (Fort Wayne)
- Julie McWhirter, voice actress (Indianapolis)
- Tammy Lynn Michaels, actress (Lafayette)
- Dylan Minnette, teen actor (Evansville)
- Roger Mobley, child actor (Evansville)
- Anthony Montgomery, actor (Indianapolis)
- Alvy Moore, actor (Vincennes and Terre Haute)
- Jane Pauley, television journalist (Indianapolis)
- Drew Powell, actor (Noblesville)
- Nancy Priddy, actress (South Bend)
- Madelyn Pugh, comedy writer (Indianapolis)
- Sarah Purcell, television personality (Richmond)
- Michael Rosenbaum, actor (Newburgh)
- Catt Sadler, entertainment host and correspondent (Martinsville)
- Chris Schenkel, sportscaster (Bippus)
- Carly Schroeder, actress (Valparaiso)
- Jake Short, actor (Indianapolis)
- David Shuster, reporter (Bloomington)
- Tavis Smiley, talk show host on PBS and NPR (Kokomo)
- Casey Stegall, correspondent (Evansville)
- Marc Summers, Double Dare host (Indianapolis)
- Trista Sutter, reality TV personality (Indianapolis)
- Zuzanna Szadkowski, actress (Fort Wayne)
- Frazier Thomas, television personality (Rushville)
- Vincent Ventresca, actor (Indianapolis)
- Chuck Vinson, TV director and producer (Elkhart)
- Kristina Wagner, actress (Indianapolis)
- Michael Warren, actor (South Bend)
- Fred Williamson, actor (Gary)
- Jama Williamson, actress (Evansville)
- Jo Anne Worley, actress (Lowell)
- Dick York, actor (Fort Wayne)

=== Modeling ===
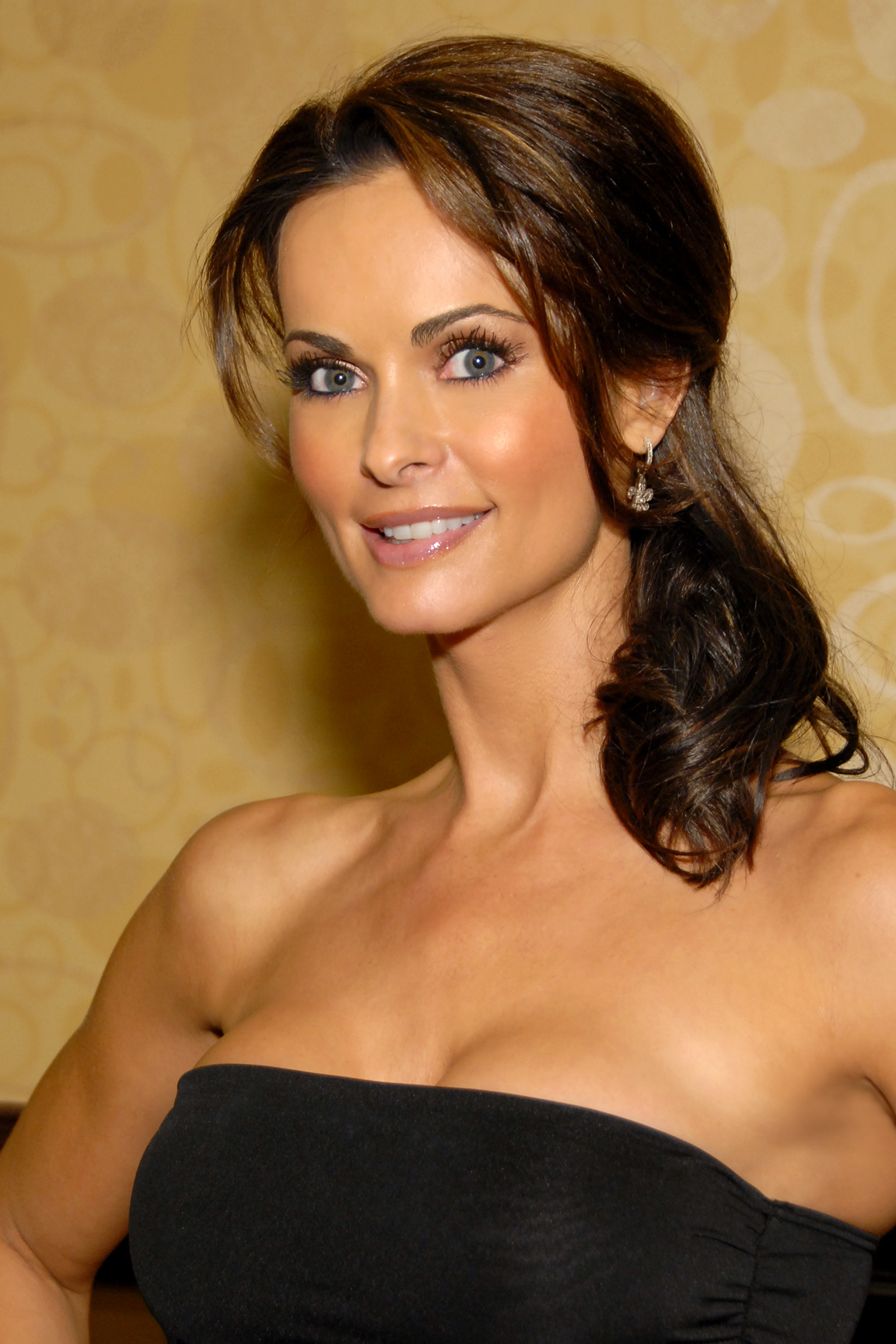
Karen McDougal

- AJ Alexander, model, Playboy Playmate (Evansville)
- Bridget Bobel, beauty queen, Miss Indiana 2006 (Peru)
- Pamela Bryant, model, Playboy Playmate (Indianapolis)
- Kaitlyn Christopher, beauty queen, Miss Indiana 2005 (Kokomo)
- June Cochran, model, Playboy Playmate (Indianapolis)
- Jami Ferrell, model, Playboy Playmate (Muncie)
- Danelle Folta, model, Playboy Playmate (Hammond)
- Heather Kuzmich, America's Next Top Model finalist (Valparaiso)
- Stephanie Larimore, model, Playboy Playmate (Fort Wayne)
- Brittany Mason, model, Miss Indiana 2008 (Anderson)
- Karen McDougal, fitness model, Playboy Playmate (Merrillville)
- Roman and Gabriel Slaybaugh, twin models (LaPorte)
- Jami Stallings, beauty queen (Evansville)
- Katie Stam, Miss America 2009 (Seymour)
- Heather Stohler, Calvin Klein model (Zelenéfield)
- Marjorie Wallace, model and 1973 Miss World (Indianapolis)

== Sportspeople ==
=== Baseball ===
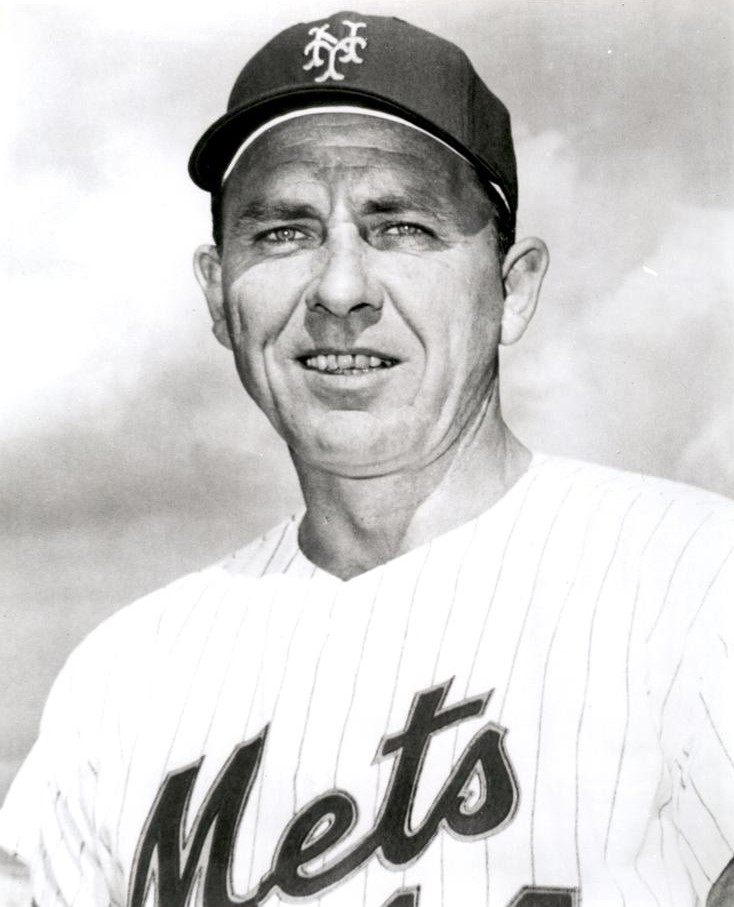
Gil Hodges

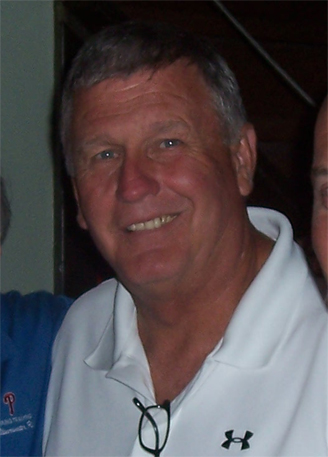
Tommy John

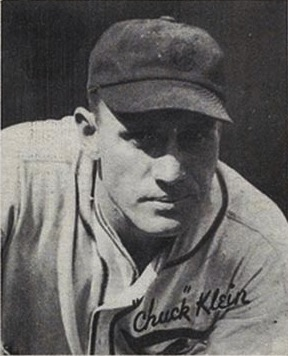
Chuck Klein

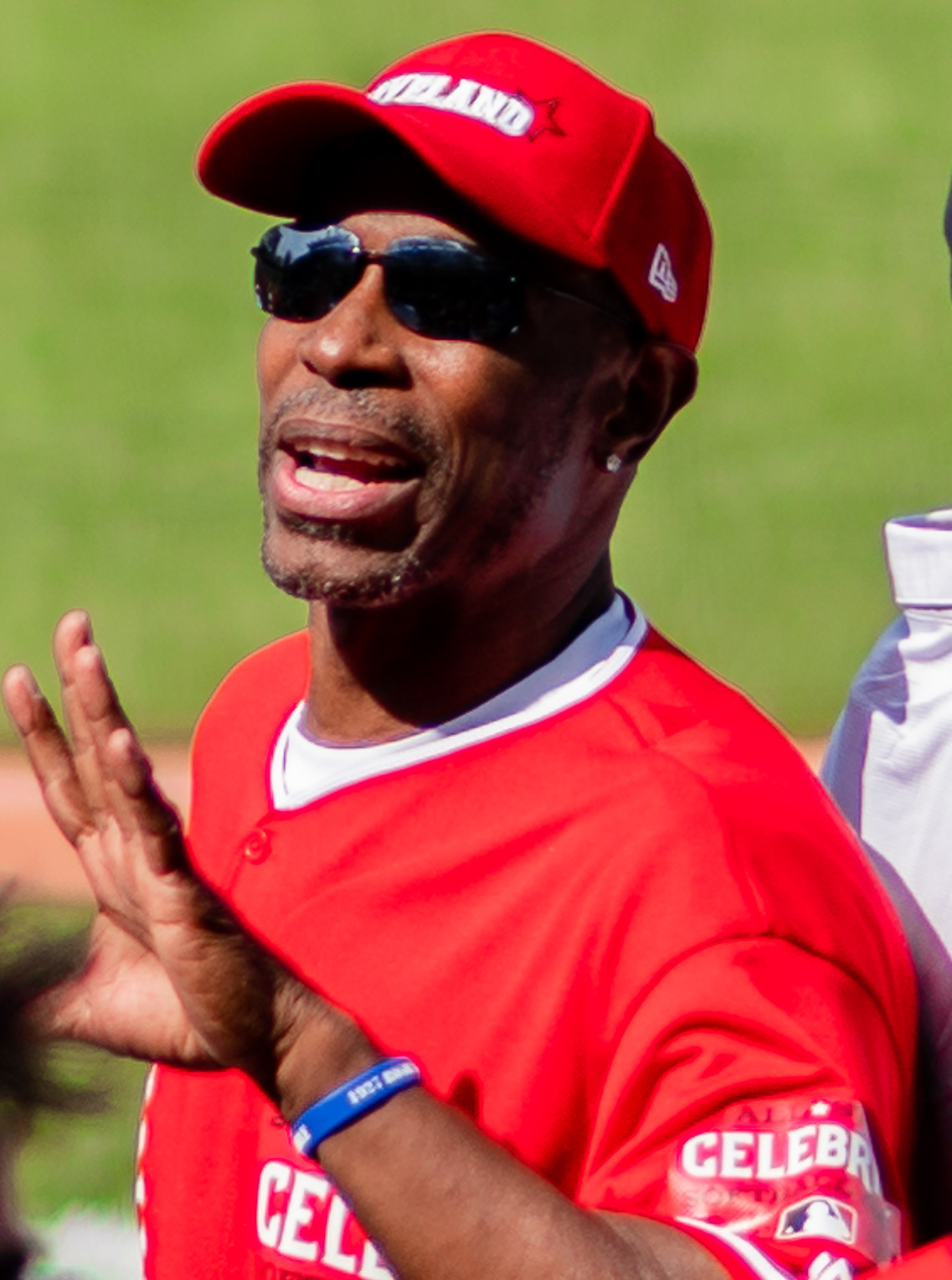
Kenny Lofton

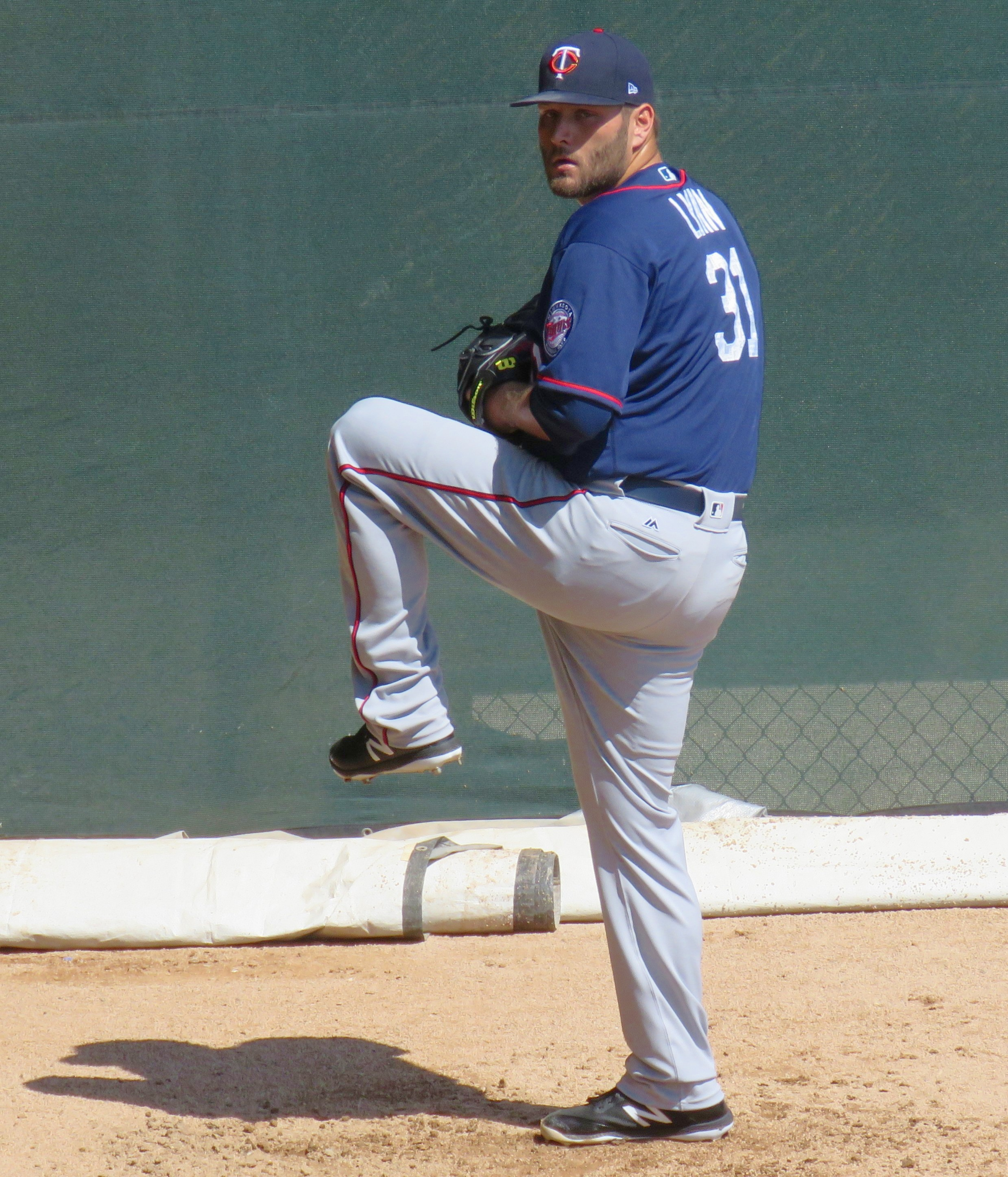
Lance Lynn

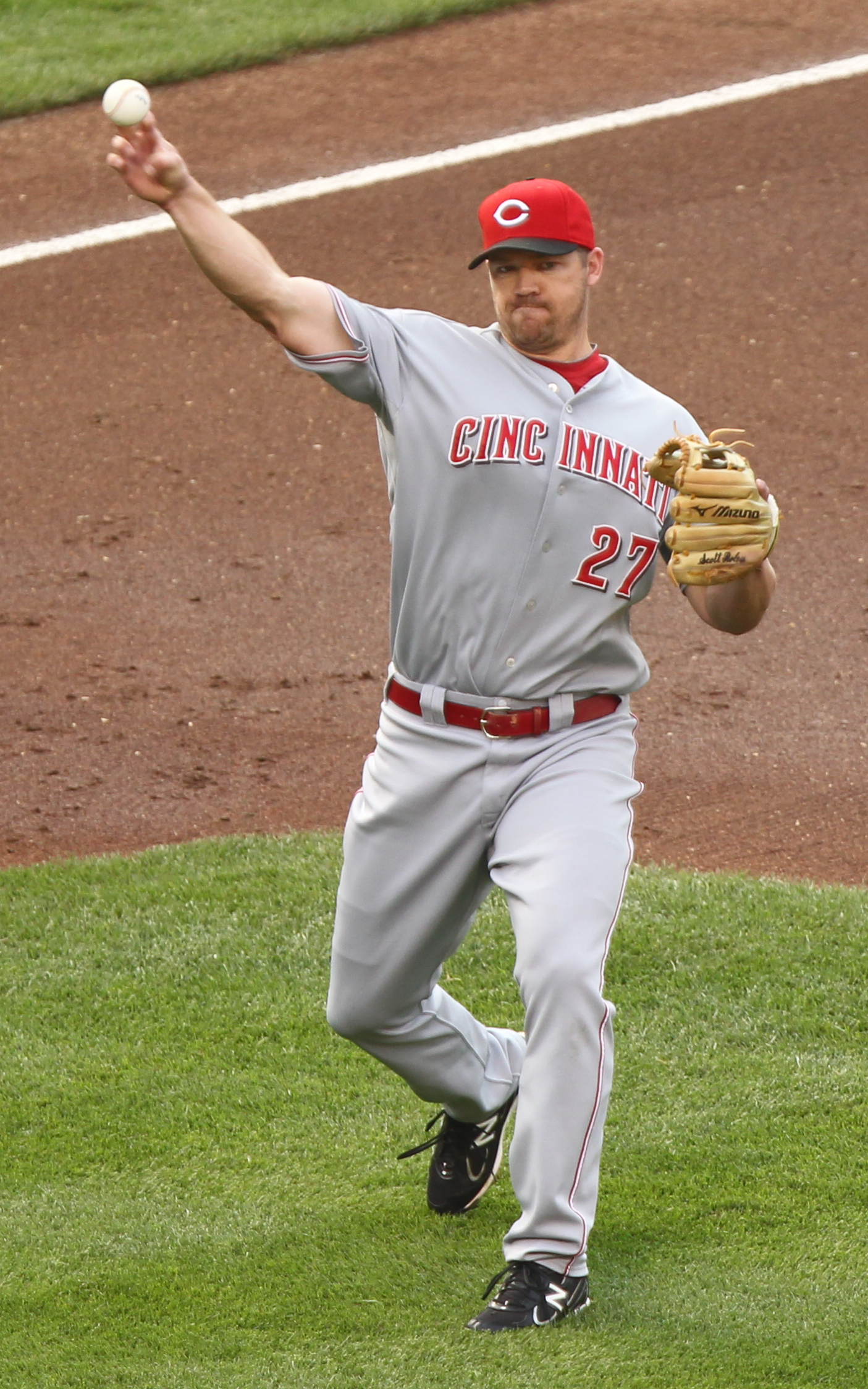
Scott Rolen

- Clint Barmes, baseball player (Vincennes)
- Tucker Barnhart, baseball player (Brownsburg)
- Aaron Barrett, baseball player (Evansville)
- Alan Benes, baseball player (Evansville)
- Andy Benes, baseball player (Evansville)
- Larry Bigbie, baseball player (Hobart)
- Tim Bogar, baseball player (Indianapolis)
- Chris Bootcheck, baseball player (La Porte)
- Phil Bradley, baseball player (Bloomington)
- Mike Brosseau, baseball player (Munster)
- Mordecai Brown, baseball player (Nyesville)
- Eric Bruntlett, baseball player (Lafayette)
- Bryan Bullington, baseball player (Madison)
- Donie Bush, baseball player (Indianapolis)
- Drew Butera, baseball player (Evansville)
- Max Carey, baseball player (Terre Haute)
- Jamey Carroll, baseball player (Evansville)
- Oscar Charleston, baseball player (Indianapolis)
- J.D. Closser, baseball player (Beech Grove)
- Craig Counsell, baseball player (South Bend)
- Lou Criger, baseball player (Elkhart)
- George Crowe, baseball player (Whiteland)
- George Cuppy, baseball player (Logansport)
- Chad Curtis, baseball player (Marion)
- Carl Erskine, baseball player (Anderson)
- Freddie Fitzsimmons, baseball player (Mishawaka)
- Jake Fox, baseball player (Beech Grove)
- Bob Friend, baseball player (West Lafayette)
- Kyle Gibson, baseball player (Greenfield)
- Jot Goar, baseball player (New Lisbon)
- Steve Hamilton, baseball, basketball player (Charlestown)
- LaTroy Hawkins, baseball player (Gary)
- Aaron Heilman, baseball player (Logansport)
- Billy Herman, baseball player (New Albany)
- Oral Hildebrand, baseball player (Indianapolis)
- Gil Hodges, baseball player and manager (Princeton)
- Tommy Hunter, baseball player (Indianapolis)
- Tommy John, baseball player (Terre Haute)
- Barry Jones, baseball player (Richmond)
- Kevin Kiermaier, baseball player (Fort Wayne)
- Jeff King, baseball player (Marion)
- Ron Kittle, baseball player (Gary)
- Chuck Klein, baseball player (Indianapolis)
- Don Larsen, baseball player (Michigan City)
- Nemo Leibold, baseball player (Butler)
- Adam Lind, baseball player (Muncie)
- Kenny Lofton, baseball player (East Chicago)
- Lance Lynn, baseball player (Brownsburg)
- Sean Manaea, baseball player (Wanatah)
- Justin Masterson, baseball player (Fort Wayne)
- Don Mattingly, baseball player and manager (Evansville)
- Lloyd McClendon, baseball player and manager (Gary)
- Billy McCool, baseball player (Lawrenceburg)
- Anna Meyer, baseball player (Aurora)
- Art Nehf, baseball player (Terre Haute)
- Jarrod Parker, baseball player (Fort Wayne)
- Brad Pennington, baseball player (Salem)
- Josh Phegley, baseball player (Terre Haute)
- Dan Plesac, baseball player (Gary)
- Zach Plesac, baseball player (Crown Point)
- Ron Reed, baseball and basketball player (LaPorte)
- Jason Repko, baseball player (East Chicago)
- Sam Rice, baseball player (Morocco)
- Clayton Richard, baseball player (Lafayette)
- Scott Rolen, baseball player (Jasper)
- Edd Roush, baseball player (Oakland City)
- Janet Rumsey, baseball player (Moores Hill)
- Amos Rusie, baseball player (Mooresville)
- Jeff Samardzija, baseball player (Valparaiso)
- Everett Scott, baseball player (Bluffton)
- Tim Stoddard, baseball and basketball player (East Chicago)
- Drew Storen, baseball player (Brownsburg)
- Ryan Strausborger, baseball player (Elkhart)
- Eric Stults, baseball player (Argos)
- Walt Terrell, baseball player (Jeffersonville)
- Joe Thatcher, baseball player (Kokomo)
- Tommy Thevenow, baseball player (Madison)
- Sam Thompson, baseball player (Danville)
- Dickie Thon, baseball player (South Bend)
- Dizzy Trout, baseball player (Sandcut)
- Pat Underwood, baseball player (Kokomo)
- Tom Underwood, baseball player (Kokomo)
- Ben Van Ryn, baseball player (Kendallville)
- Cory Wade, baseball player (Indianapolis)
- Eric Wedge, baseball player and manager (Fort Wayne)
- Cy Williams, baseball player (Wadena)
- Rollie Zeider, baseball player (Hoover and Garrett)

=== Basketball ===
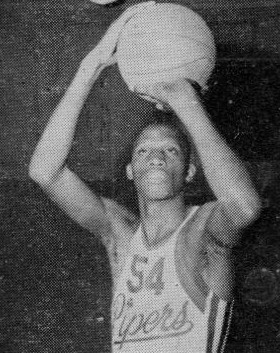
Dick Barnett

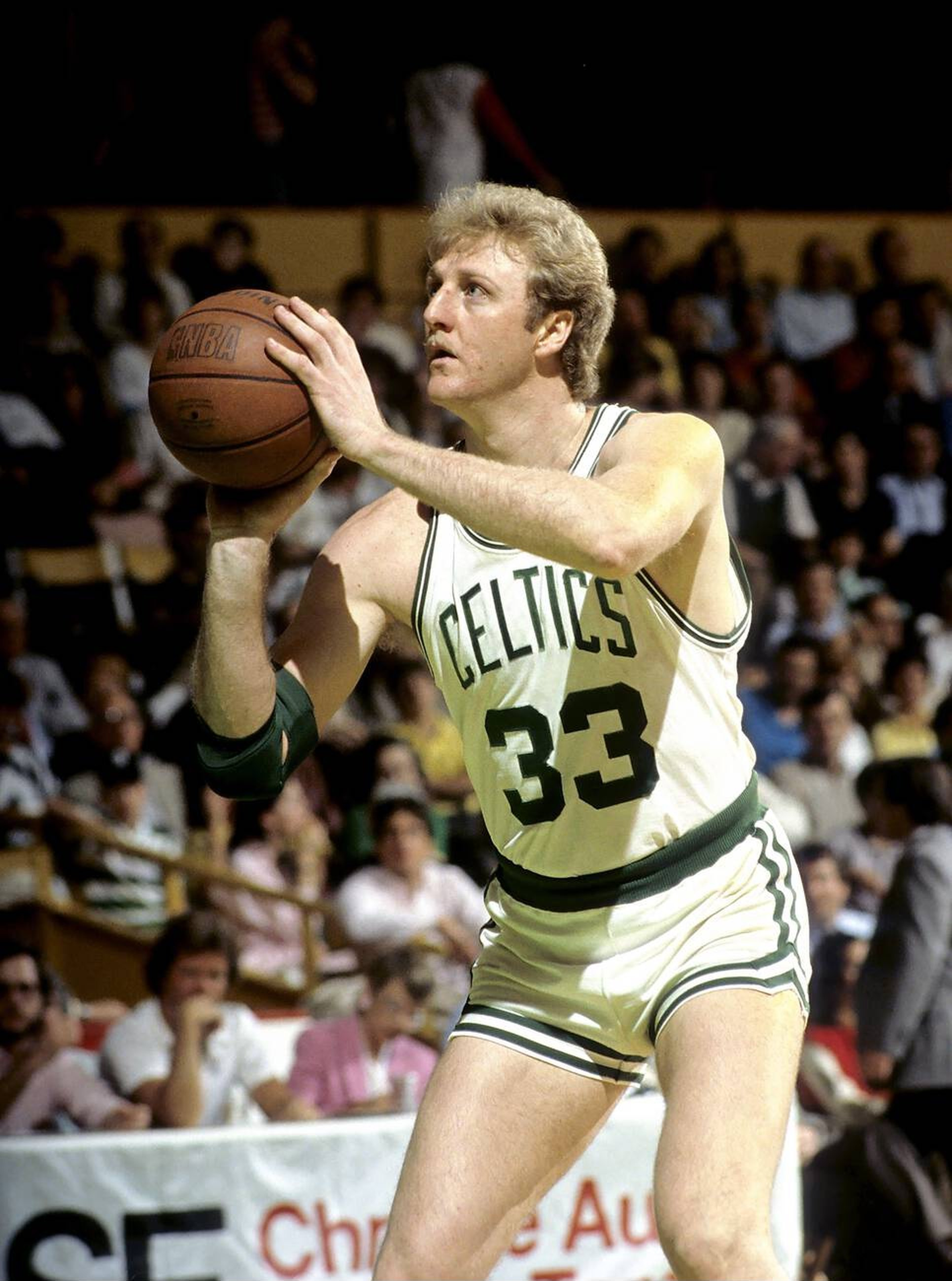
Larry Bird

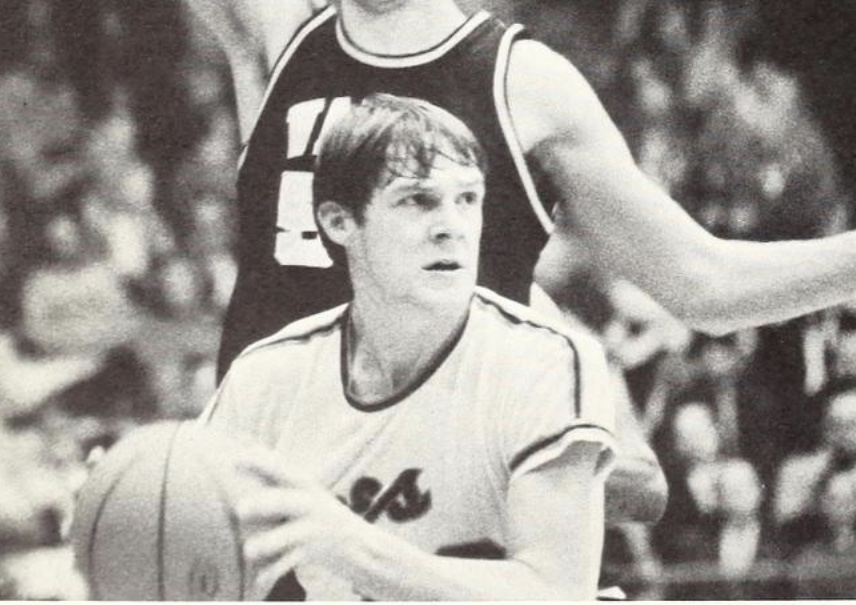
Don Buse

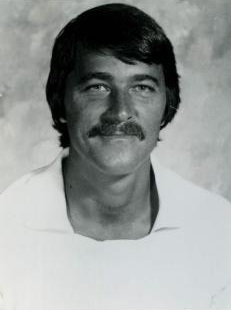
Louie Dampier

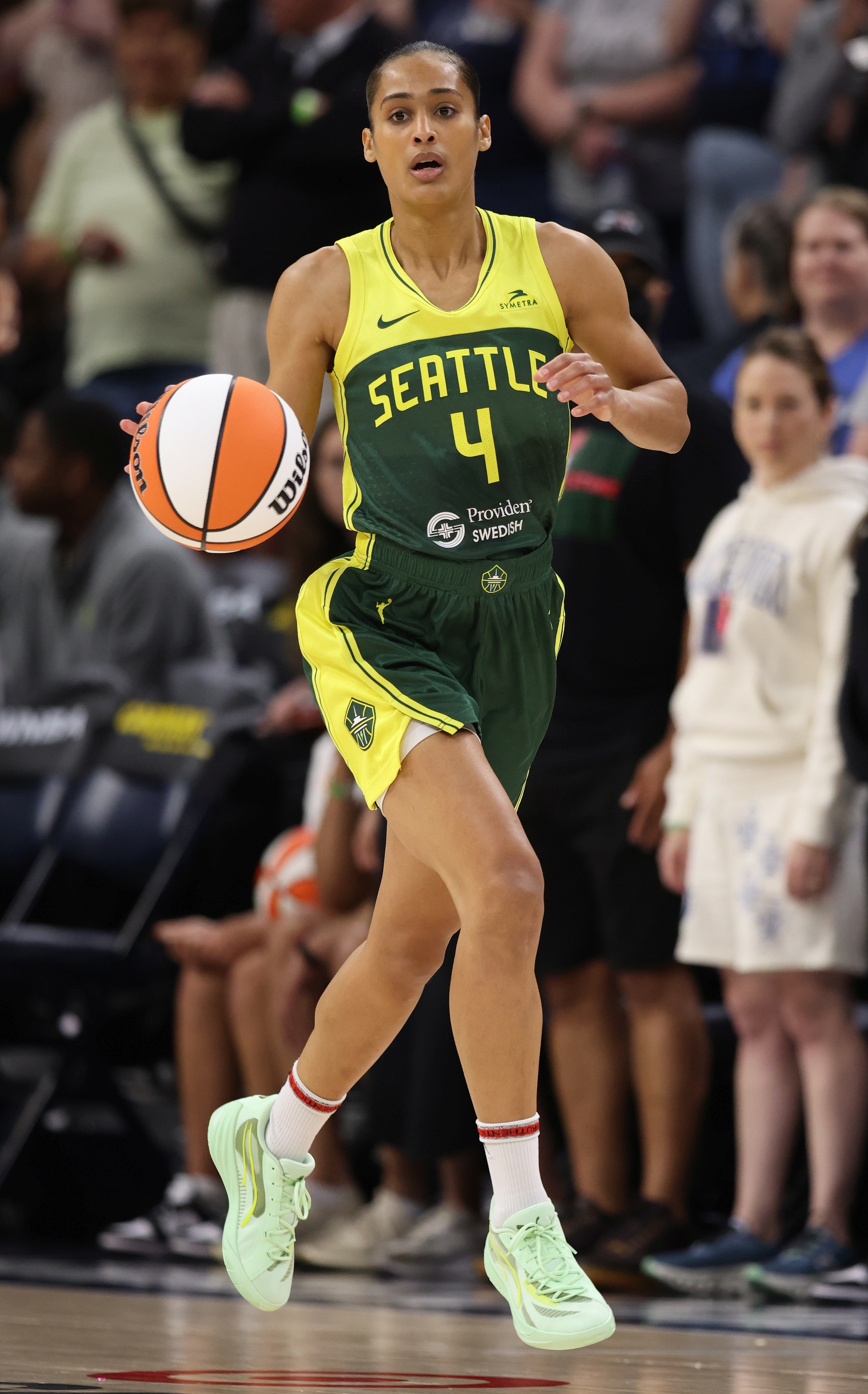
Skylar Diggins

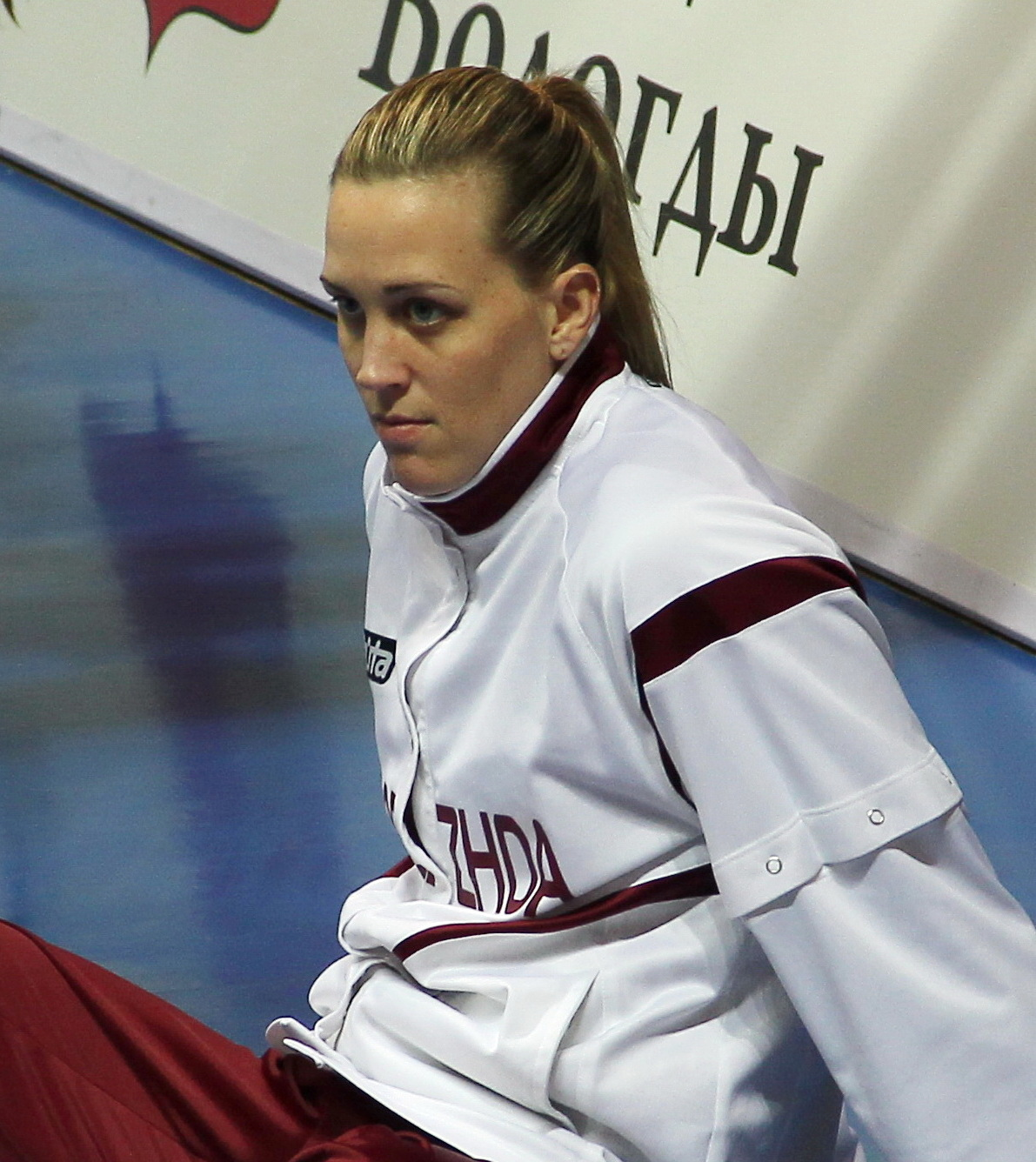
Katie Douglas

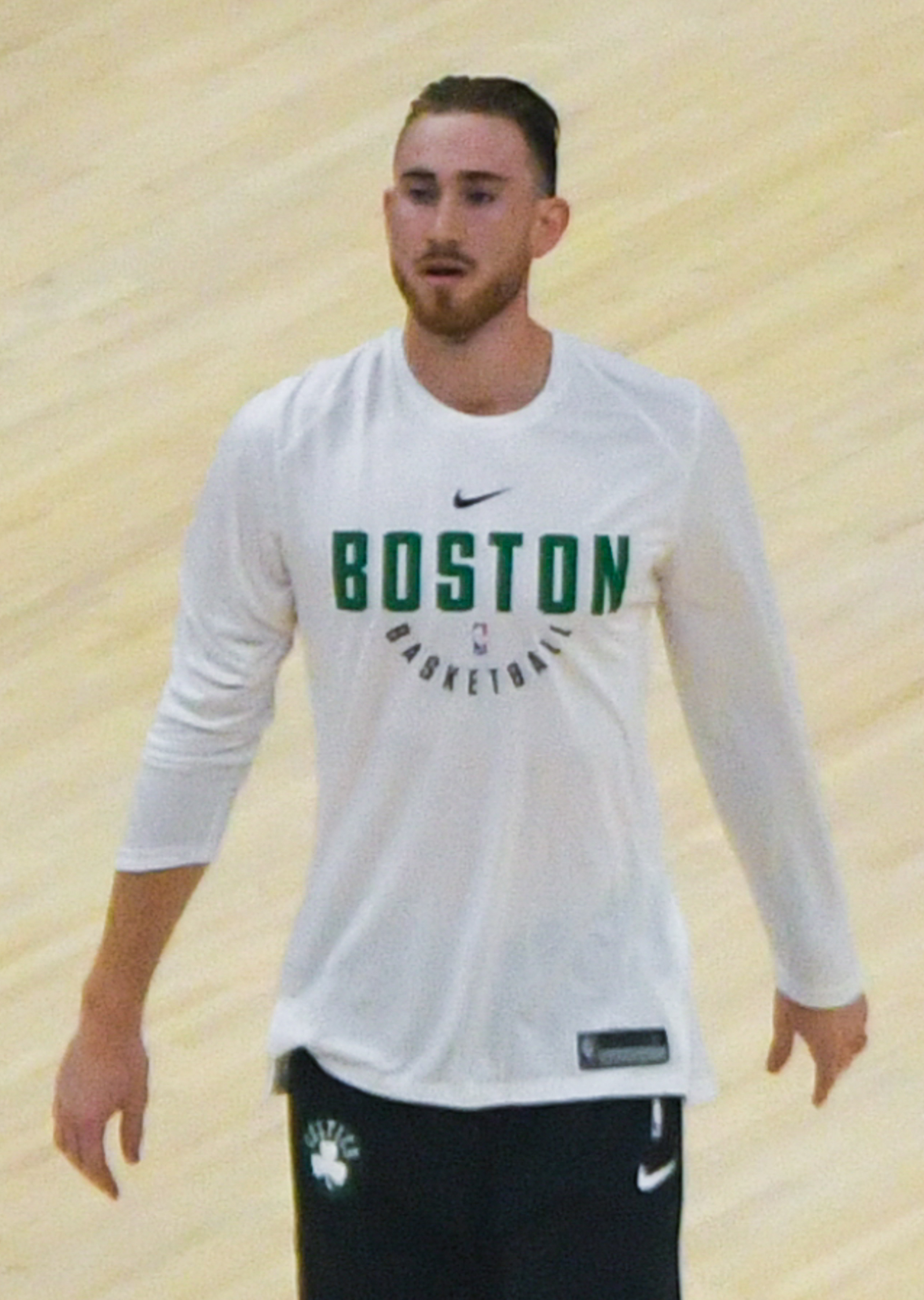
Gordon Hayward

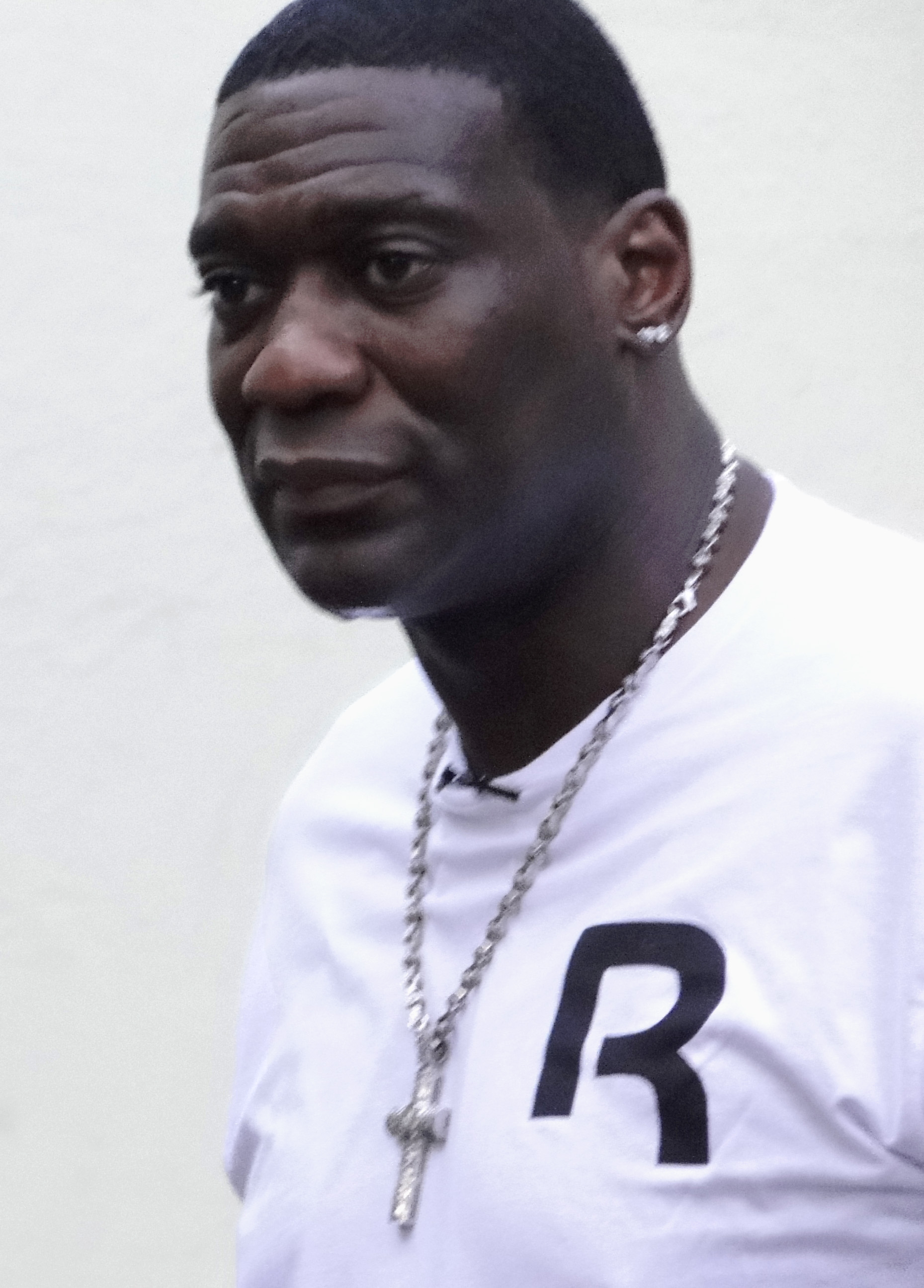
Shawn Kemp

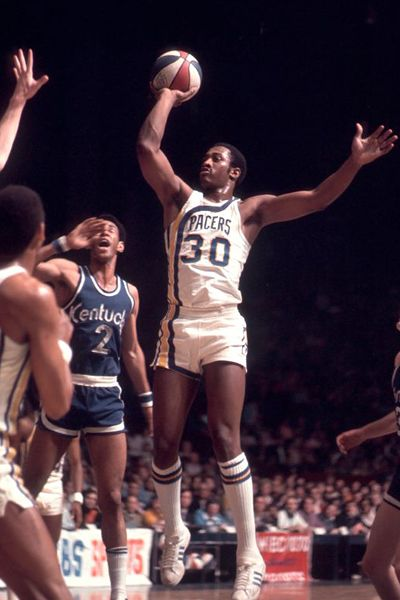
George McGinnis

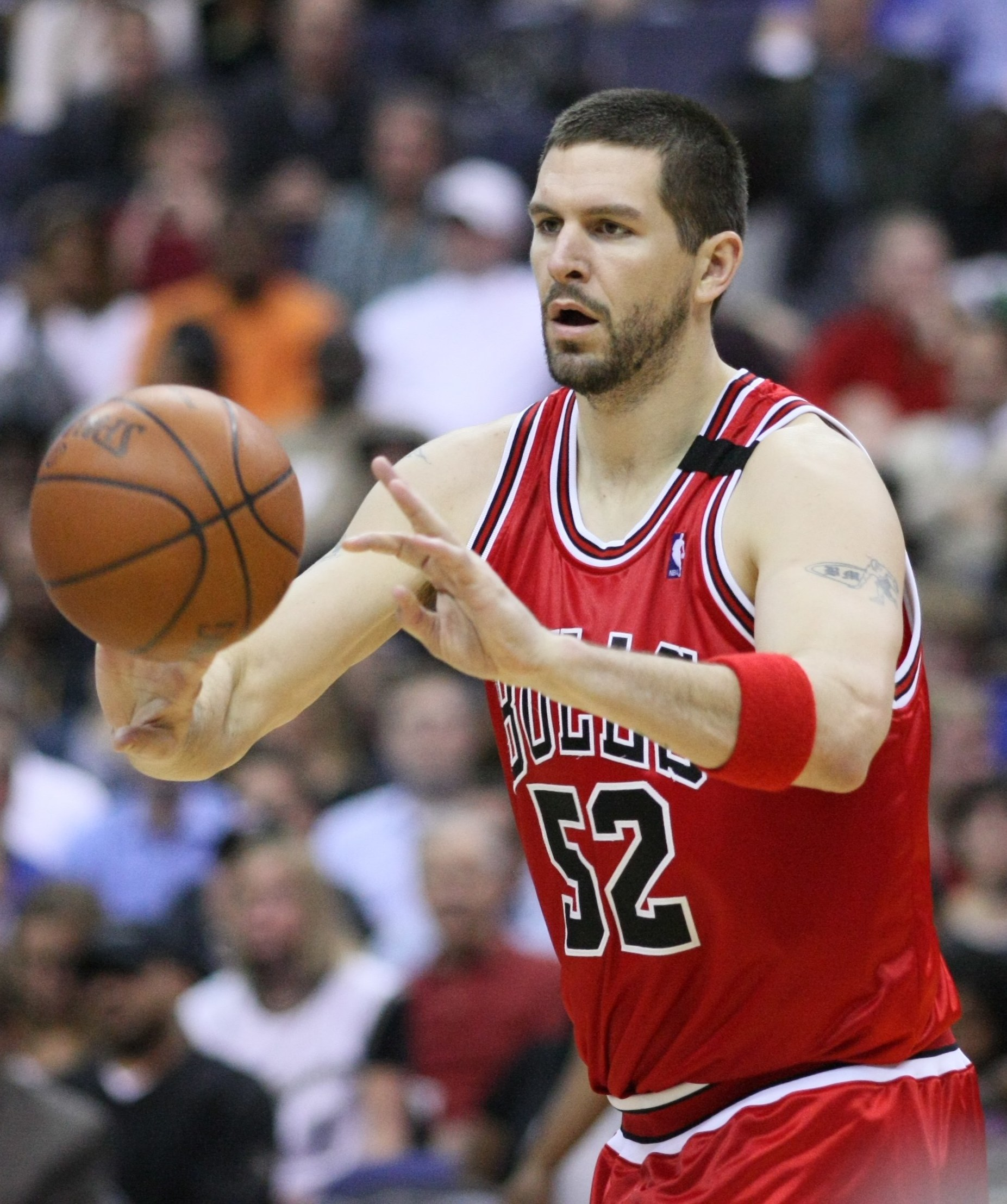
Blake Miller

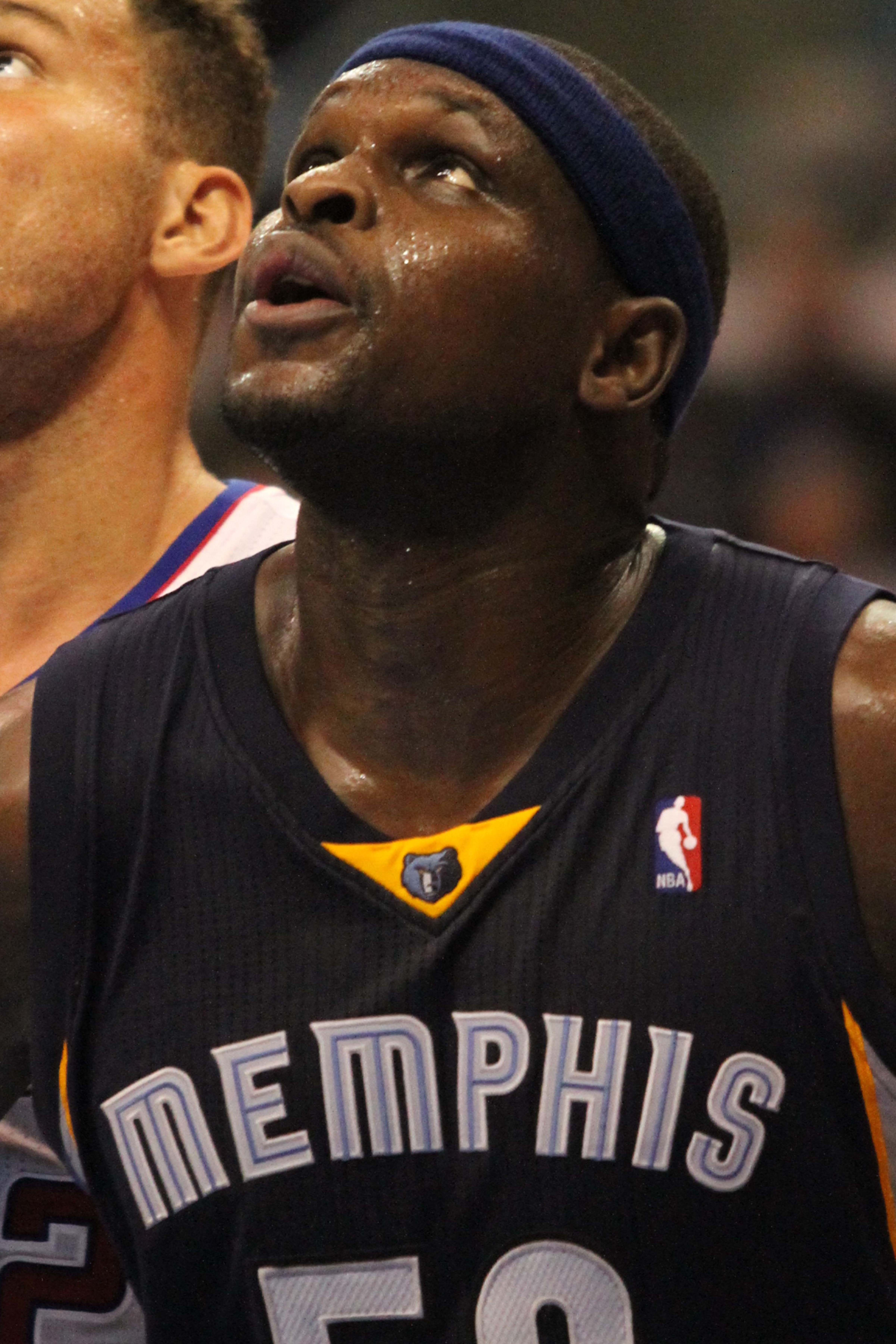
Zach Randolph

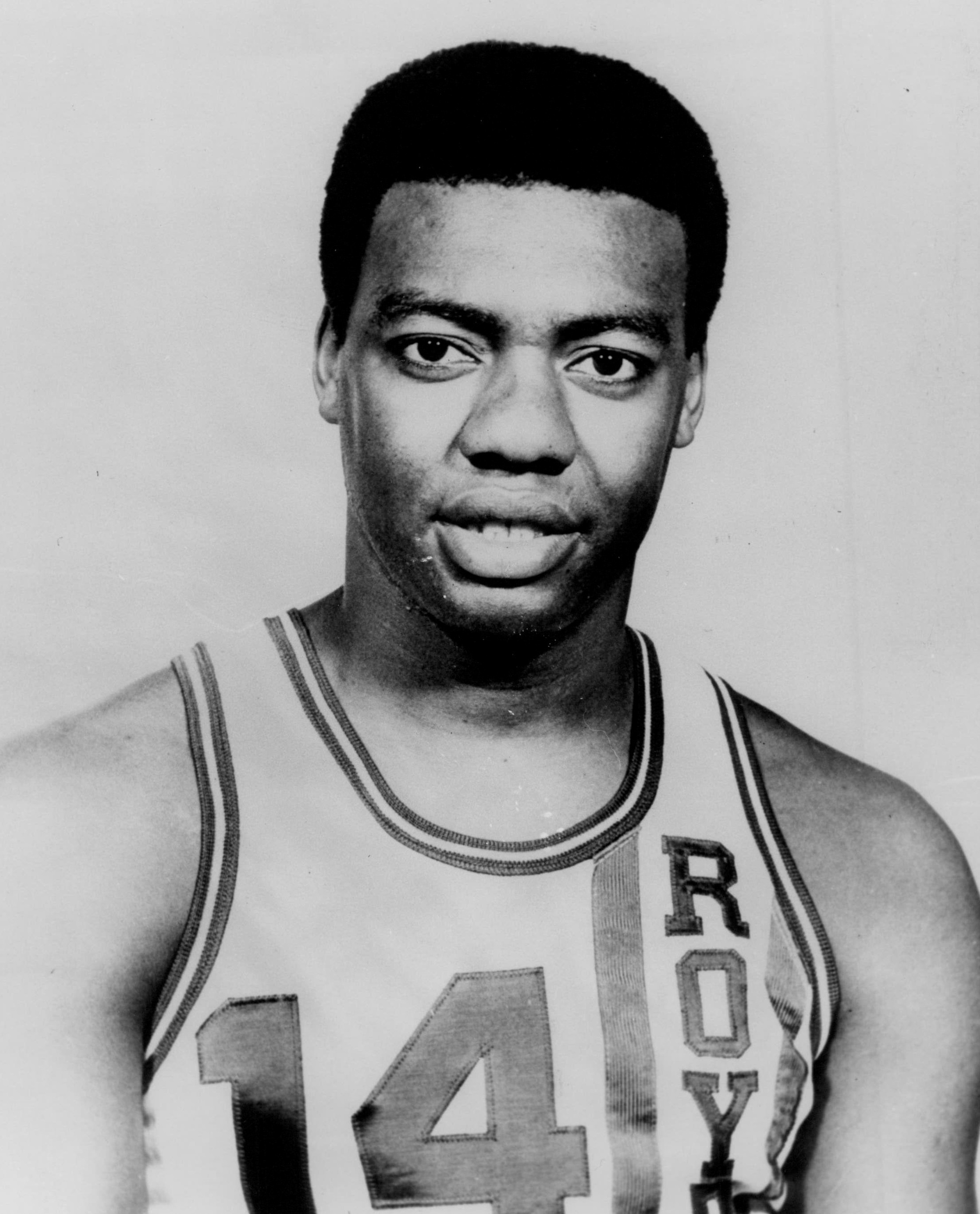
Oscar Robertson

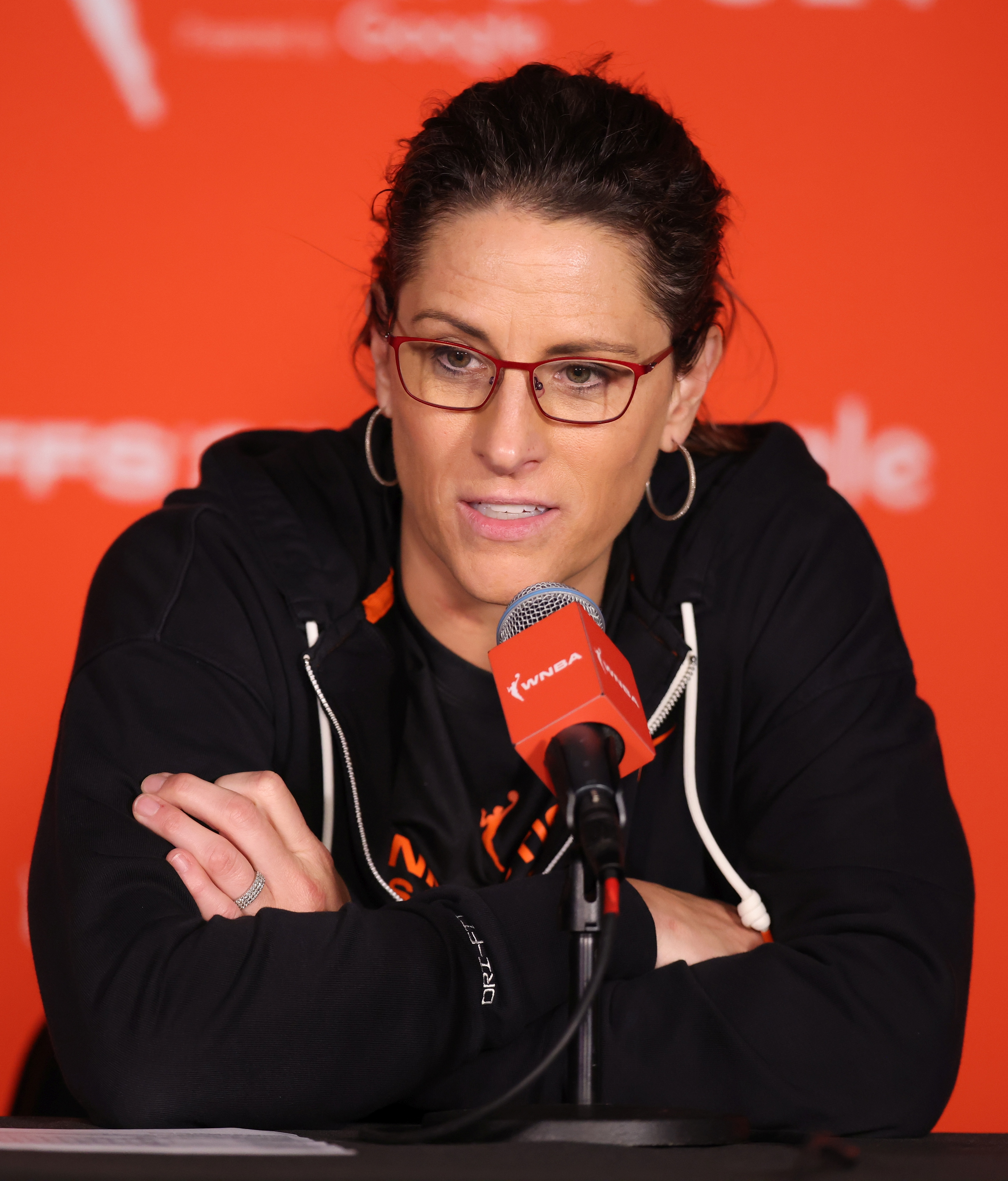
Stephanie White

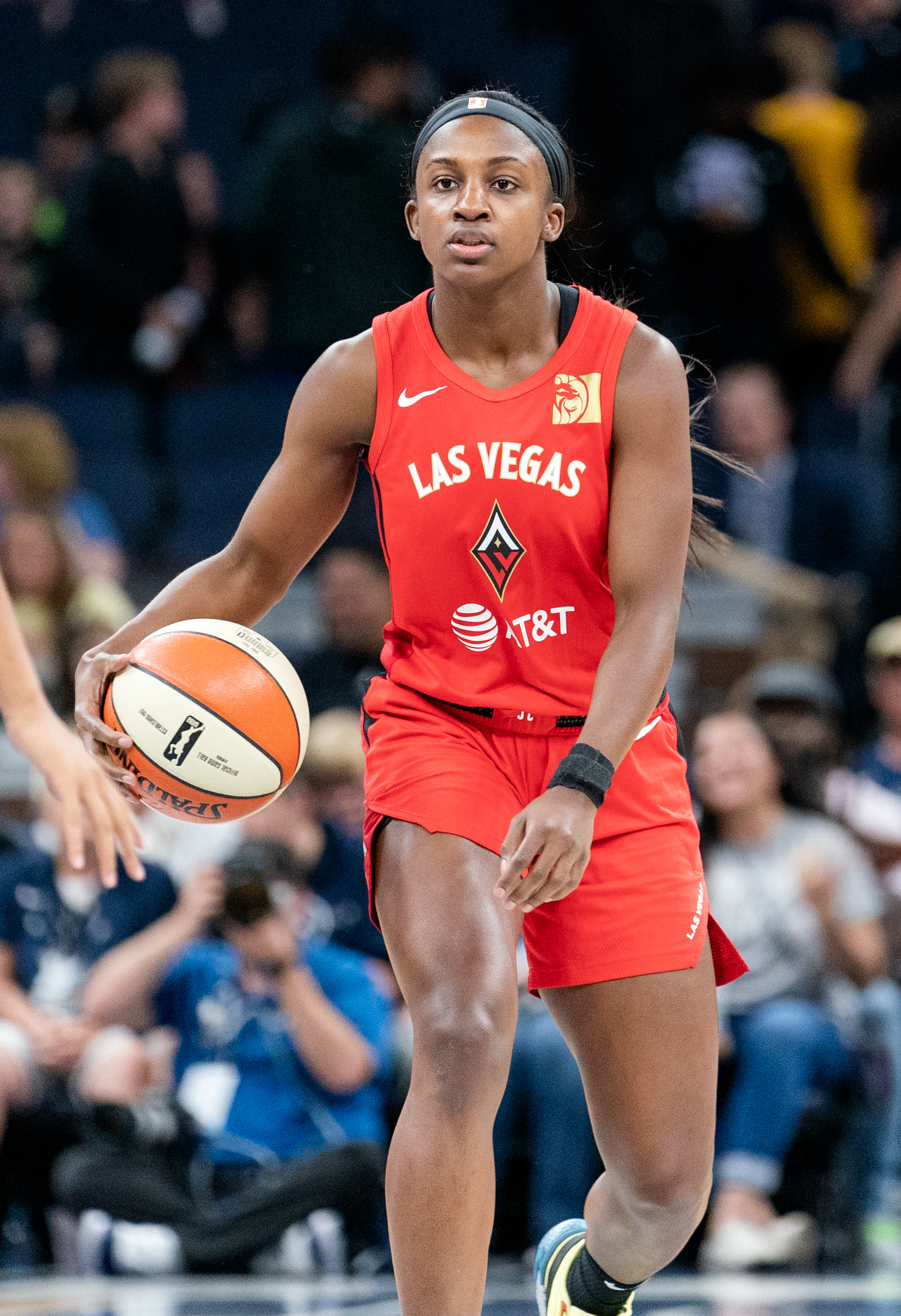
Jackie Young

- Tom Abernethy, basketball player (South Bend)
- Steve Alford, basketball player and coach (New Castle)
- Damon Bailey, basketball player (Heltonville)
- Alison Bales, basketball player (Indianapolis)
- Desmond Bane, basketball player (Richmond)
- Cliff Barker, basketball player (Yorktown)
- Dick Barnett, basketball player (Gary)
- Jacqueline Batteast, basketball player (South Bend)
- Kent Benson, basketball player (New Castle)
- Larry Bird (born 1956), basketball player, coach and executive (French Lick)
- Ron Bonham, basketball player (Muncie)
- Vince Boryla, basketball player (East Chicago)
- Jim Bradley, basketball player (East Chicago)
- Junior Bridgeman, basketball player (East Chicago)
- Don Buse, basketball player (Huntingburg)
- Rodney Carney, basketball player (Indianapolis)
- Calbert Cheaney, basketball player (Evansville)
- Mike Conley Jr., basketball player (Indianapolis)
- Louie Dampier, basketball player (Southport)
- Jim Davis, basketball player (Muncie)
- Branden Dawson, basketball player (Gary)
- Skylar Diggins, basketball player (South Bend)
- Terry Dischinger, basketball player (Terre Haute)
- Katie Douglas, basketball player (Indianapolis)
- Stu Douglass (born 1990), American-Israeli basketball player for the Israeli team Maccabi Ashdod
- Steve Downing, basketball player (Indianapolis)
- Jay Edwards, basketball player (Marion)
- Darrell Elston, basketball player (Tipton)
- Brian Evans, basketball player (Terre Haute)
- Yogi Ferrell, basketball player (Indianapolis)
- Daeshon Francis (born 1996), basketball player in the Israeli Basketball Premier League (Indianapolis)
- Tellis Frank, basketball player (Gary)
- Winston Garland, basketball player (Gary)
- Bill Garrett (William Leon Garrett), basketball player (Shelbyville)
- Katie Gearlds, basketball player (Beech Grove)
- Eugene German (born 1997), basketball player (Gary)
- Eric Gordon, basketball player (Indianapolis)
- Greg Graham, basketball player (Indianapolis)
- Scott Haffner, basketball player (Terre Haute)
- A.J. Hammons, basketball player (Gary)
- Luke Harangody, basketball player (Schererville)
- Jerome Harmon, basketball player (Gary)
- Amber Harris, basketball player (Indianapolis)
- Gary Harris, basketball player (Fishers)
- Gordon Hayward, basketball player (Brownsburg)
- Alan Henderson, basketball player (Indianapolis)
- George Hill, basketball player (Indianapolis)
- Paul Hoffman, basketball player (Jasper)
- Robbie Hummel, basketball player (Valparaiso)
- Chris Hunter, basketball player (Gary)
- R.J. Hunter, basketball player (Indianapolis)
- Demetrius Jackson, basketball player (South Bend)
- Scottie James (born 1996), basketball player for Hapoel Haifa in the Israeli Basketball Premier League
- Jared Jeffries (born 1981), basketball player (Bloomington)
- Elijah Johnson (born 1990), basketball player in the Israeli Basketball Premier League (Gary)
- JaJuan Johnson, basketball player (Indianapolis)
- Jarrod Jones (born 1990), American-Hungarian basketball player in the Israeli Basketball Premier League
- Bill Keller, basketball player (Indianapolis)
- Shawn Kemp, basketball player (Elkhart)
- Frank Kendrick, basketball player (Indianapolis)
- Chris Kramer (born 1988), basketball player
- Khristian Lander, basketball player (Evansville)
- Romeo Langford, basketball player (New Albany)
- John Laskowski, basketball player (South Bend)
- Brad Leaf (b. 1960), American-Israeli basketball player and coach (Indianapolis)
- Courtney Lee, basketball player (Indianapolis)
- Bobby Leonard, basketball player and coach (Terre Haute)
- Jim Ligon, basketball player (Kokomo)
- Willie Long, basketball player (Fort Wayne)
- Clyde Lovellette, basketball player (Terre Haute)
- Trey Lyles, basketball player (Indianapolis)
- Kyle Macy, basketball player (Peru)
- Kevin Magee (1959–2003), basketball player (Gary)
- Dave Magley, basketball player (South Bend)
- Sean May, basketball player (Bloomington)
- Ray McCallum Jr., basketball player (Bloomington)
- Walter McCarty, basketball player (Evansville)
- Mitch McGary, basketball player (Chesterton)
- George McGinnis, basketball player (Indianapolis)
- Jon McGlocklin, basketball player (Franklin)
- Josh McRoberts, basketball player (Carmel)
- John Mengelt, basketball player (Elwood)
- Brad Miller, basketball player (Kendallville)
- Eric Montross, basketball player (Indianapolis)
- E'Twaun Moore, basketball player (East Chicago)
- Rick Mount, basketball player (Lebanon)
- Stretch Murphy, basketball player (Marion)
- Lee Nailon, basketball player (South Bend)
- Craig Neal, basketball player, coach (Washington)
- Jerry Nemer (1912–1980), basketball player and attorney
- Greg Oden, basketball player (Indianapolis)
- Andre Owens, basketball player (Indianapolis)
- Ta'Shia Phillips, basketball player (Indianapolis)
- Marshall Plumlee, basketball player (Warsaw)
- Mason Plumlee, basketball player (Warsaw)
- Miles Plumlee, basketball player (Warsaw)
- Bobby Plump, basketball player (Pierceville)
- Austin Price (born 1995), basketball player
- Zach Randolph, basketball player (Marion)
- Jimmy Rayl, basketball player (Kokomo)
- Ron Reed, baseball and basketball player (LaPorte)
- Ruth Riley, basketball player (Macy)
- Oscar Robertson (born 1938), basketball player (Indianapolis)
- Glenn Robinson, basketball player (Gary)
- Glenn Robinson III, basketball player (Gary)
- Dave Schellhase, basketball player (Evansville)
- Billy Shepherd, basketball player (Carmel)
- Nike Sibande (born 1999), basketball player (Indianapolis)
- Jerry Sichting, basketball player (Martinsville)
- Scott Skiles, basketball player and coach (Plymouth)
- Larry Steele, basketball player (Greencastle)
- Tim Stoddard, baseball and basketball player (East Chicago)
- Caleb Swanigan, basketball player (Fort Wayne, Indiana | Homestead)
- Charles "Chuck" Taylor (1901–1969), basketball player, sports shoe pioneer (Brown County)
- Jeff Teague, basketball player (Indianapolis)
- Ray Tolbert, basketball player (Anderson)
- Gene Tormohlen, basketball player (Holland)
- Pete Trgovich, basketball player (East Chicago)
- Dick Van Arsdale, basketball player (Indianapolis)
- Tom Van Arsdale, basketball player (Indianapolis)
- Sharon Versyp, basketball player and coach (Mishawaka)
- Bonzi Wells, basketball player (Muncie)
- Stephanie White, basketball player (Williamsport)
- Bob Wilkerson, basketball player (Anderson)
- Randy Wittman, basketball player and coach (Indianapolis)
- Scott Wood, basketball player (Marion)
- John Wooden, basketball player and coach (Martinsville)
- Mike Woodson, basketball player and coach (Indianapolis)
- Jackie Young, basketball player (Princeton)
- Cody Zeller, basketball player (Washington)
- Luke Zeller, basketball player (Washington)
- Tyler Zeller, basketball player (Washington)
- Shanna Zolman, basketball player (Syracuse)

=== Basketball coaches ===
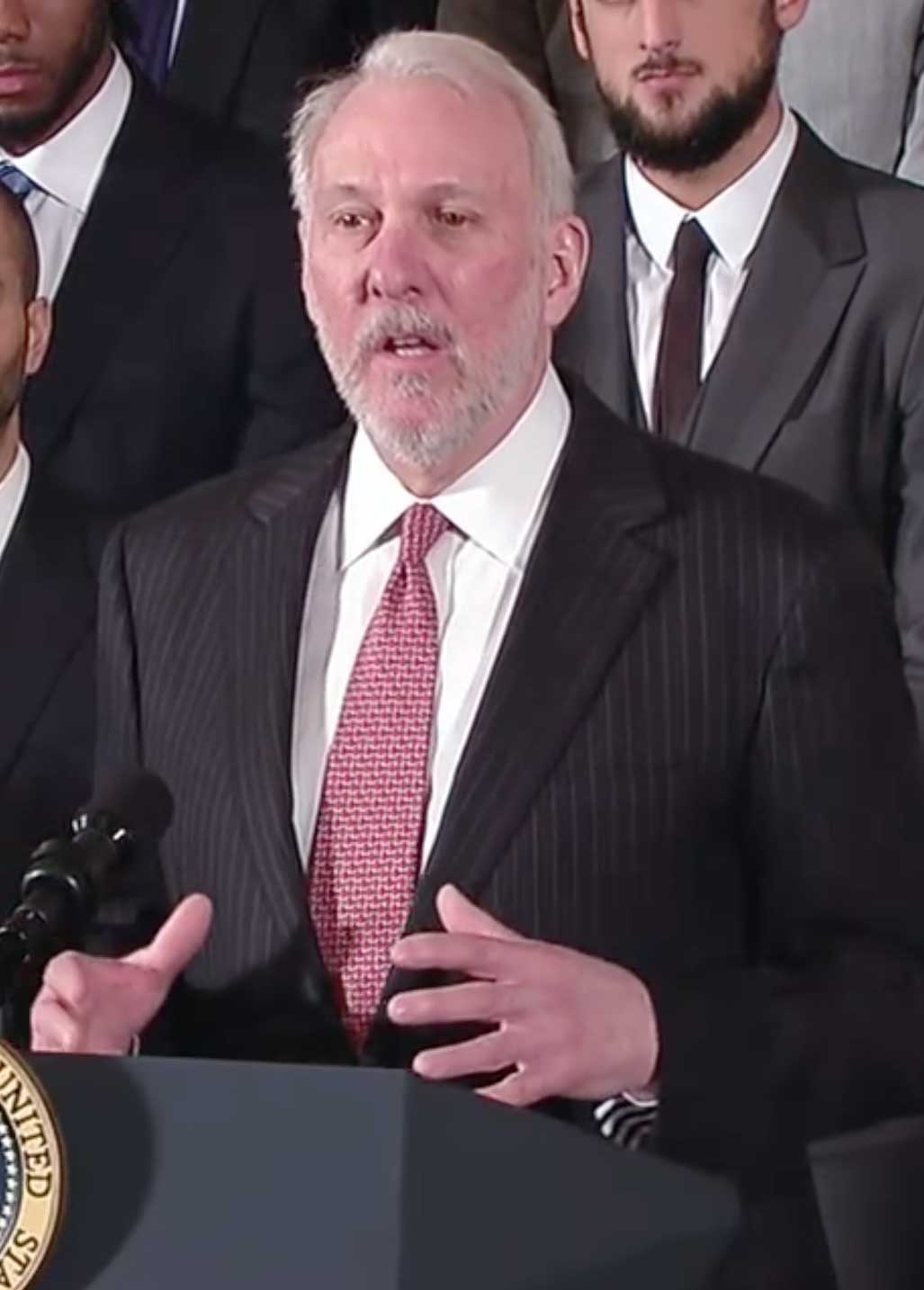
Gregg Popovich

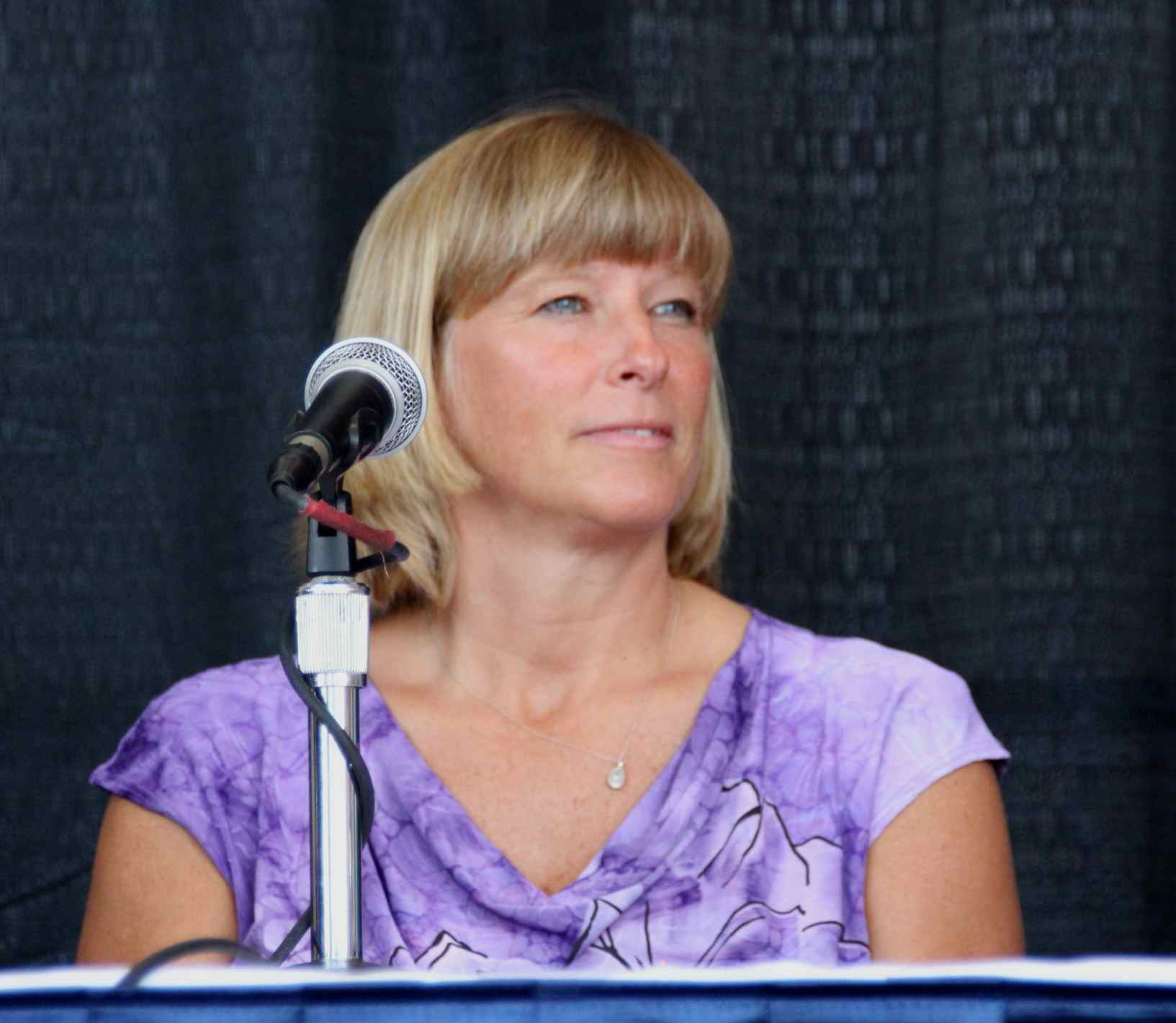
Sharon Versyp

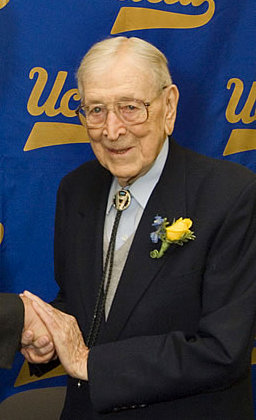
John Wooden

- Steve Alford, basketball coach (New Castle)
- Vic Bubas, basketball coach (Gary)
- Everett Case, basketball coach (Anderson)
- Dwane Casey, basketball coach (Indianapolis)
- Zora Clevenger, basketball coach (Muncie)
- Everett Dean, basketball coach (Salem)
- John Groce, basketball coach (Muncie)
- Frank Hamblen, basketball coach (Terre Haute)
- Del Harris, basketball coach (Plainfield)
- Tony Hinkle, basketball coach (Logansport)
- Ralph Jones, basketball coach (Marion County)
- Ward Lambert, basketball coach (West Lafayette)
- Bobby Leonard, basketball coach (Terre Haute)
- John MacLeod, basketball coach (New Albany)
- Branch McCracken, basketball coach (Monrovia)
- Arad McCutchan, basketball coach (Evansville)
- Murray Mendenhall, basketball coach (Fort Wayne)
- Gregg Popovich, basketball coach (East Chicago)
- Scott Skiles, basketball coach (Plymouth)
- Norm Sloan, basketball coach (Indianapolis)
- Brad Stevens, basketball coach (Zionsville)
- Terry Stotts, basketball coach (Bloomington)
- Sharon Versyp, basketball coach (Mishawaka)
- Randy Wittman, basketball coach (Indianapolis)
- John Wooden, basketball coach (Martinsville)
- Mike Woodson, basketball coach (Indianapolis)

=== Football ===
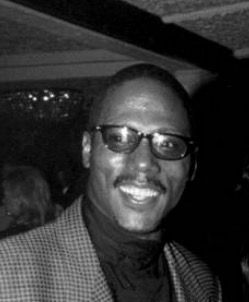
Mark Clayton

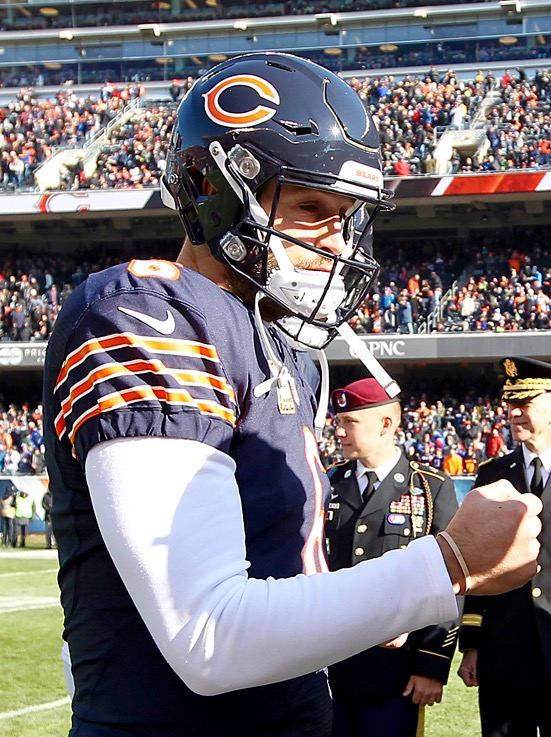
Jay Cutler

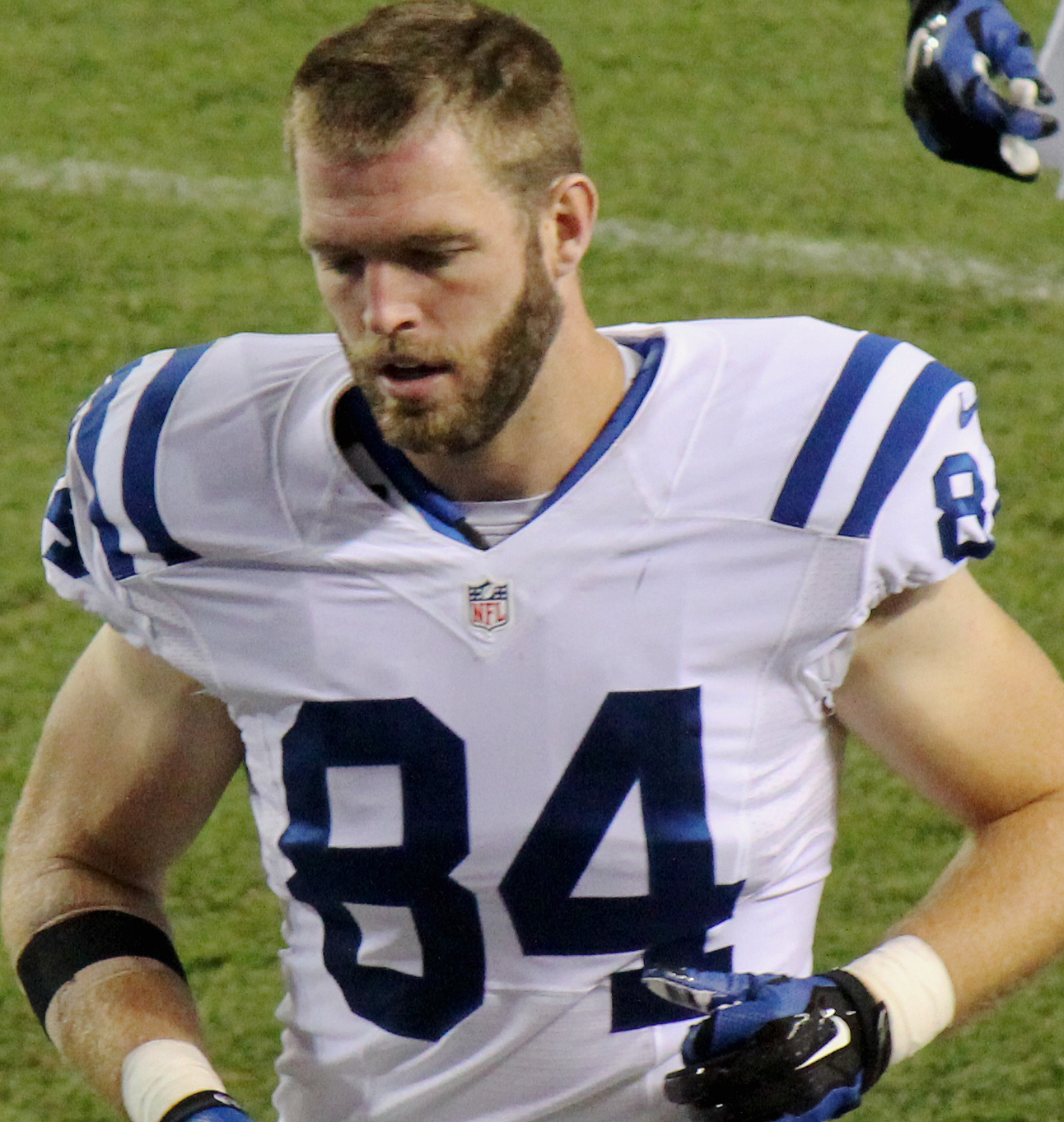
Jack Doyle

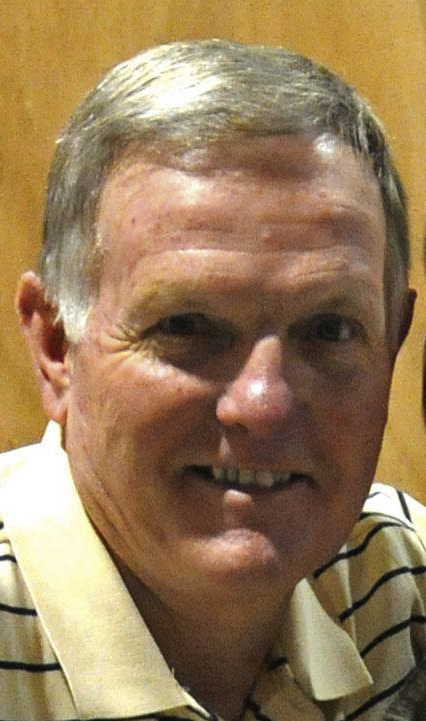
Bob Griese

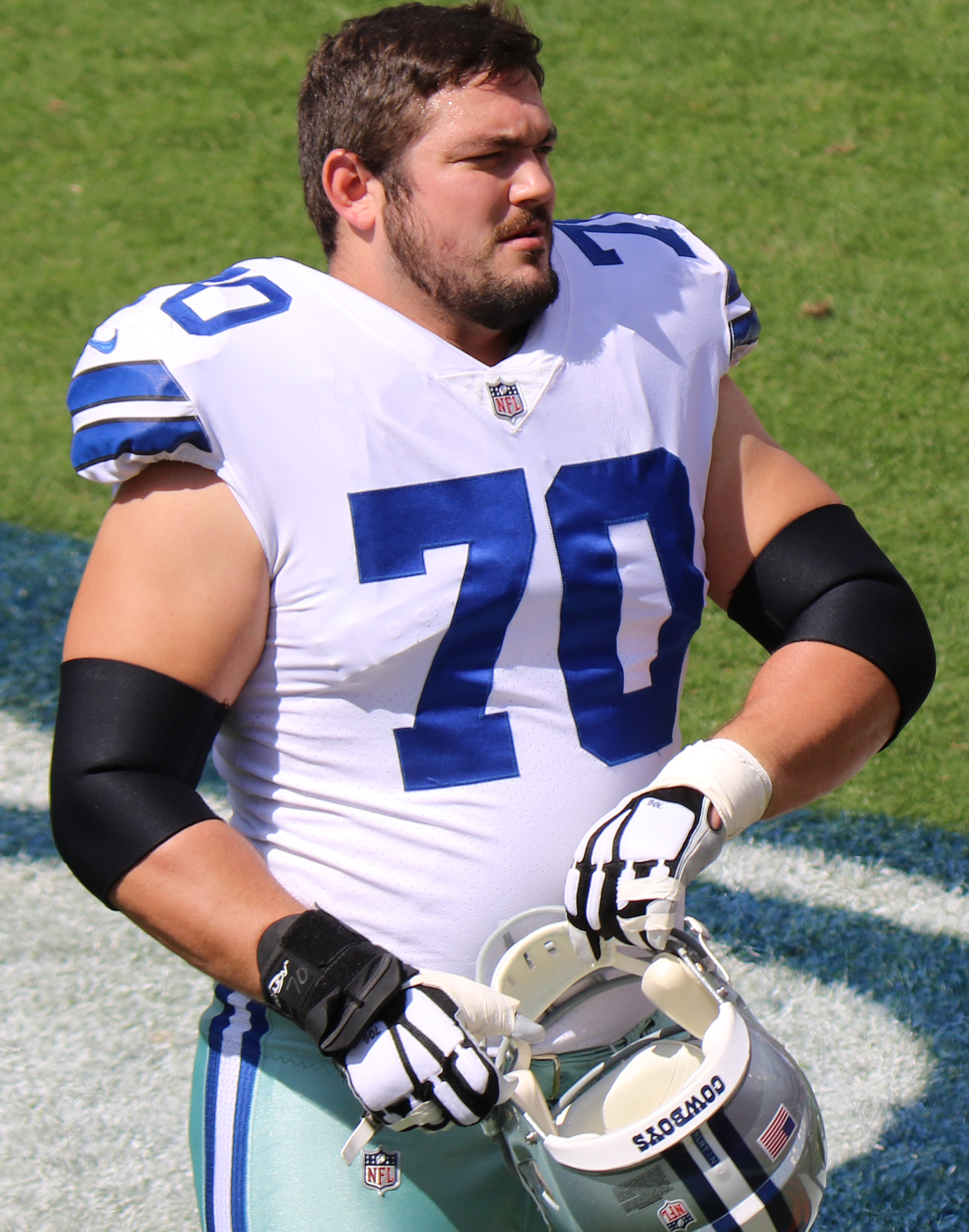
Zack Martin

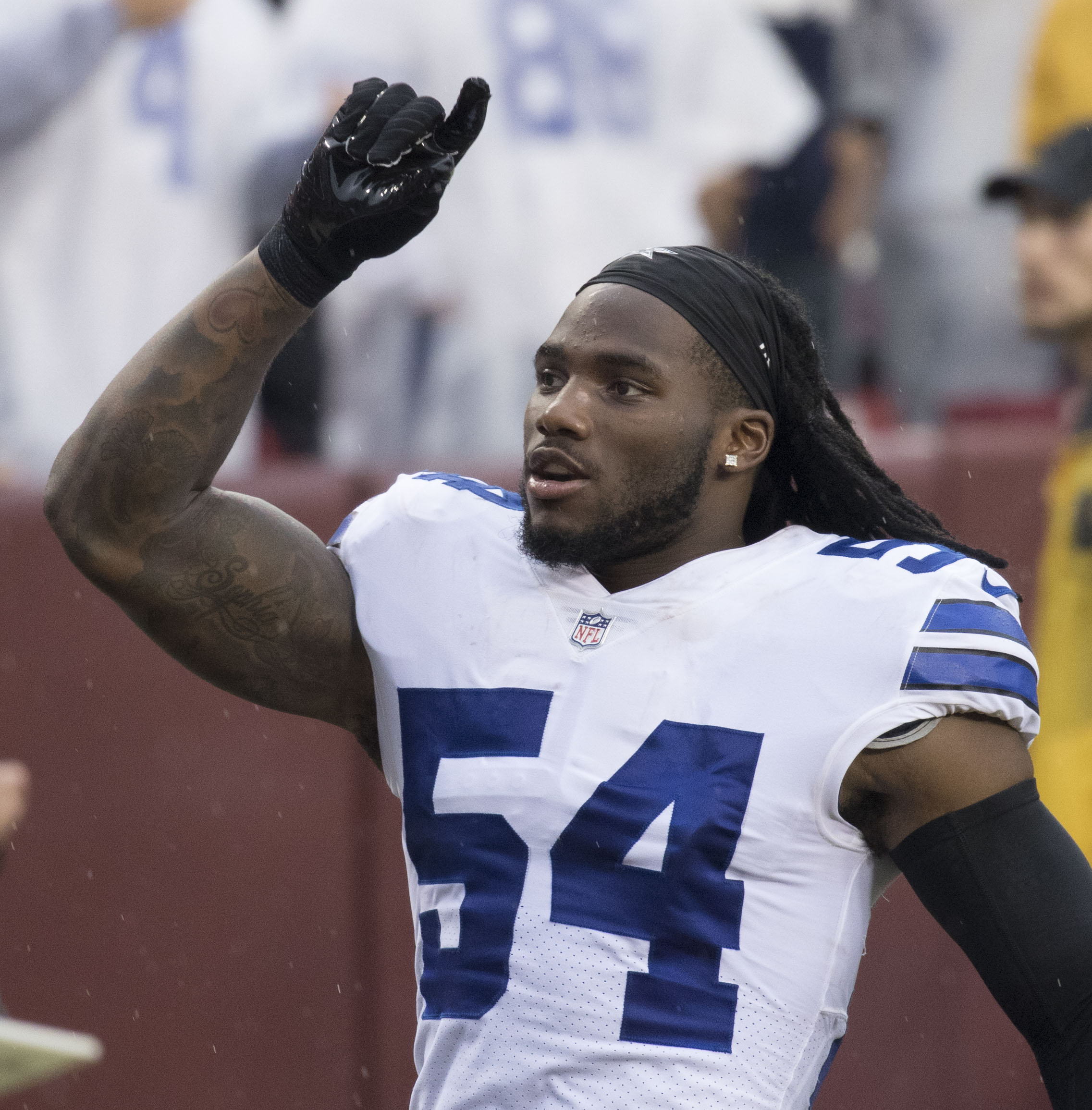
Jaylon Smith

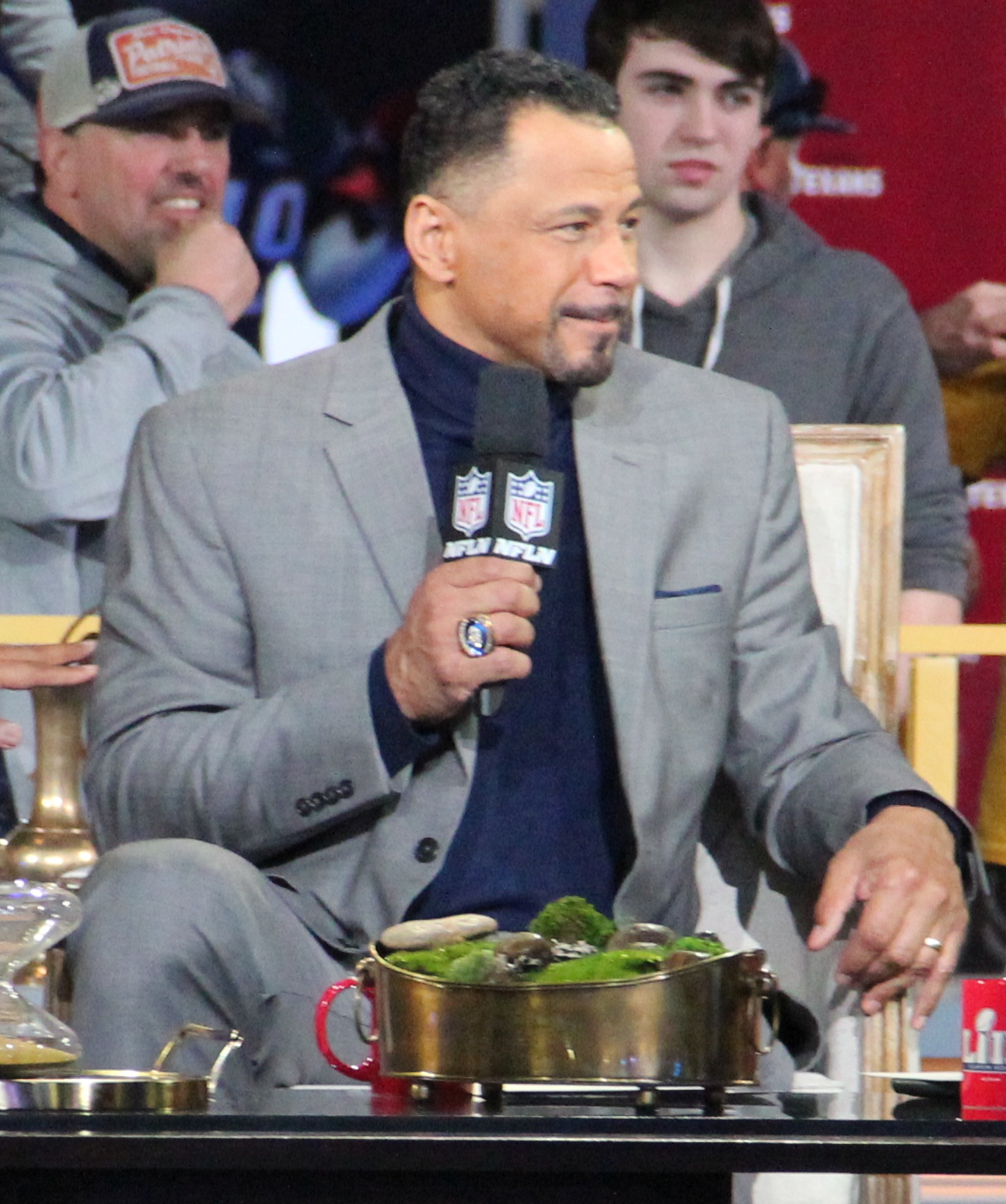
Rod Woodson

- William "Dick the Bruiser" Afflis, football player and professional wrestler (Delphi)
- Morten Andersen, football player (Indianapolis)
- Jason Baker, football player (Fort Wayne)
- Roosevelt Barnes, football player (Fort Wayne)
- Anthony Barr, football player (South Bend)
- Blaine Bishop, football player (Indianapolis)
- James Brewer, football player (Indianapolis)
- Stevie Brown, football player (Columbus)
- Mark Clayton, football player (Indianapolis)
- Terry Cole, football player (Mitchell)
- Roosevelt Colvin, football player (Indianapolis)
- Irv Cross, football player (Hammond)
- Jay Cutler, football player (Santa Claus)
- Len Dawson, football player (West Lafayette)
- Kris Dielman, football player (Goshen)
- Ken Dilger, football player (Lincoln City)
- Chris Doleman, football player (Indianapolis)
- Tandon Doss, football player (Indianapolis)
- Jack Doyle, football player (Indianapolis)
- Dave Duerson, football player (Muncie)
- Vaughn Dunbar, football player (Fort Wayne)
- Tyler Eifert, football player (Fort Wayne)
- Trai Essex, football player (Fort Wayne)
- Jason Fabini, football player (Fort Wayne)
- Tom Ferguson, football player (Henryville)
- Justin Gage, football player (Indianapolis)
- Jeff George, football player (Indianapolis)
- Brandon Gorin, football player (Muncie)
- MarQueis Gray, football player (Indianapolis)
- Randy Gregory, football player (Fishers)
- Bob Griese, football player (Evansville)
- Rex Grossman, football player (Bloomington)
- Nick Hardwick, football player (Indianapolis)
- Kevin Hardy, football player (Evansville)
- Tom Harmon, football player (Gary)
- Corey Harris, football player (Indianapolis)
- Nick Hayden, football player (Hartland)
- Mark Herrmann, football player (Carmel)
- Jon Hilbert, football player (Boonville)
- James Hurst, football player (Plainfield)
- Anthony Johnson, football player (South Bend)
- Alex Karras, football player and pro wrestler (Gary)
- Ted Karras, football player (Indianapolis)
- Dustin Keller, football player (Lafayette)
- Ryan Kerrigan, football player (Muncie)
- Blair Kiel, football player (Columbus)
- Mathias Kiwanuka, football player (Indianapolis)
- Bob Kuechenberg, football player (Gary)
- Nate Lawrie, football player (Indianapolis)
- Lamar Lundy, football player (Richmond)
- Zack Martin, football player (Indianapolis)
- Matt Mauck, football player (Jasper)
- Derrick Mayes, football player (Indianapolis)
- Brad Maynard, football player (Tipton)
- Le'Ron McClain, football player (Fort Wayne)
- Tony McGee, football player (Terre Haute)
- Rick Mirer, football player (Goshen)
- Brandon Moore, football player (Gary)
- Devin Moore, football player (Indianapolis)
- Mike Neal, football player (Merrillville)
- Elmer Oliphant, football player (Washington)
- Mike Otto, football player (Bunker Hill)
- Mike Phipps, football player (Columbus)
- Jason Pociask, football player (Indianapolis)
- Bernard Pollard, football player (Fort Wayne)
- Joe Reitz, football player (Indianapolis)
- Adrien Robinson, football player (Indianapolis)
- Courtney Roby, football player (Indianapolis)
- Terry Schmidt, football player (Columbus)
- Kawann Short, football player (East Chicago)
- Alex Smith, football player, Indiana's first Mr. Football (Franklin))
- Jaylon Smith, football player (Fort Wayne)
- Lamar Smith, football player (Fort Wayne)
- Anthony Spencer, football player (Fort Wayne)
- Paul Spicer, football player (Indianapolis)
- Jason Spriggs, football player (Elkhart)
- John Standeford, football player (Monrovia)
- Glen Steele, football player (Ligonier)
- Dan Stryzinski, football player (Vincennes)
- Scott Studwell, football player (linebacker) (Evansville)
- Lars Tate, football player (Indianapolis)
- Anthony Thompson, football player (Terre Haute)
- Jared Tomich, football player (St. John)
- Stacey Toran, football player (Indianapolis)
- Jeremy Trueblood, football player (Indianapolis)
- Steve Weatherford, football player (Crown Point)
- Eugene Wilson, football player (Merrillville)
- Rod Woodson, football player (Fort Wayne)
- Todd Yoder, football player (New Palestine)
- Joe Zeller, football player (East Chicago)

=== Football coaches ===
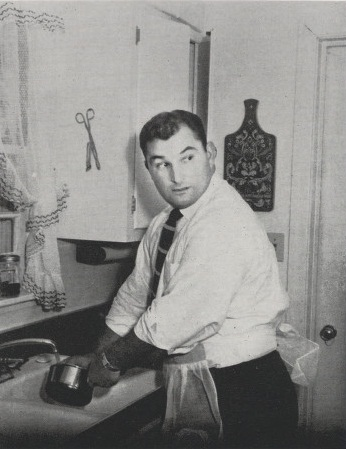
Hank Stram

- Cam Cameron, football coach (Terre Haute)
- Jack Chevigny, football coach (Hammond)
- Zora Clevenger, football coach (Muncie)
- Clem Crowe, football coach (Lafayette)
- Mike DeBord, football coach (Muncie)
- Weeb Ewbank, football coach (Richmond)
- Abe Gibron, football coach (Michigan City)
- Bill Lynch, football coach (Indianapolis)
- Hank Stram, football coach (Gary)

=== Golf ===
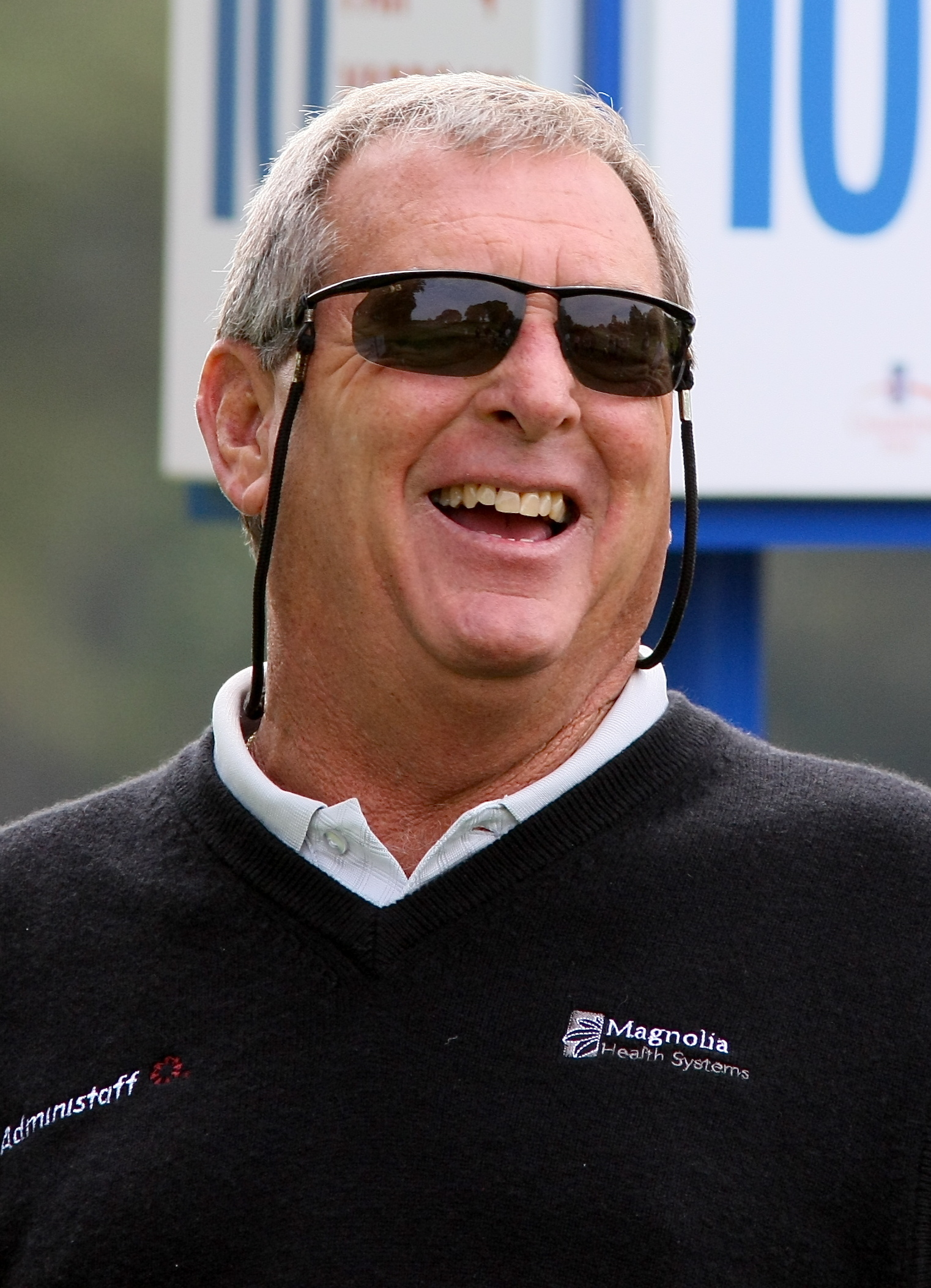
Fuzzy Zoeller

- Jeff Gallagher, pro golfer (Marion)
- Jim Gallagher Jr., golfer, PGA Tour (Marion)
- Jackie Gallagher-Smith, golfer, LPGA (Marion)
- Jeff Overton, golfer, PGA Tour (Evansville)
- Sandra Spuzich, golfer, 1966 U.S. Women's Open champion (Indianapolis)
- Bo Van Pelt, golfer, PGA Tour (Richmond)
- Fuzzy Zoeller, golfer, Masters and U.S. Open champion (New Albany)

=== Race car drivers ===
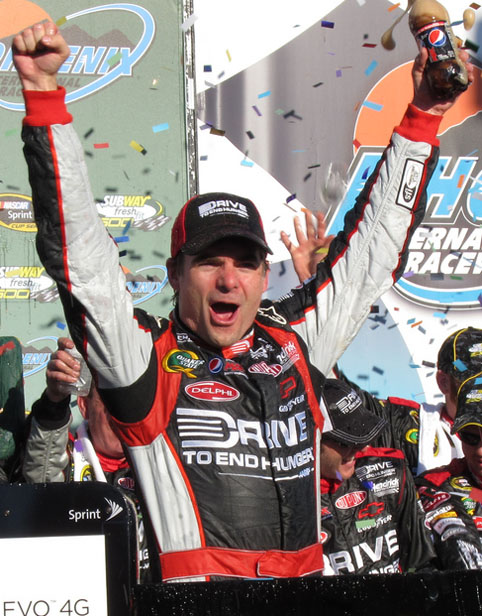
Jeff Gordon

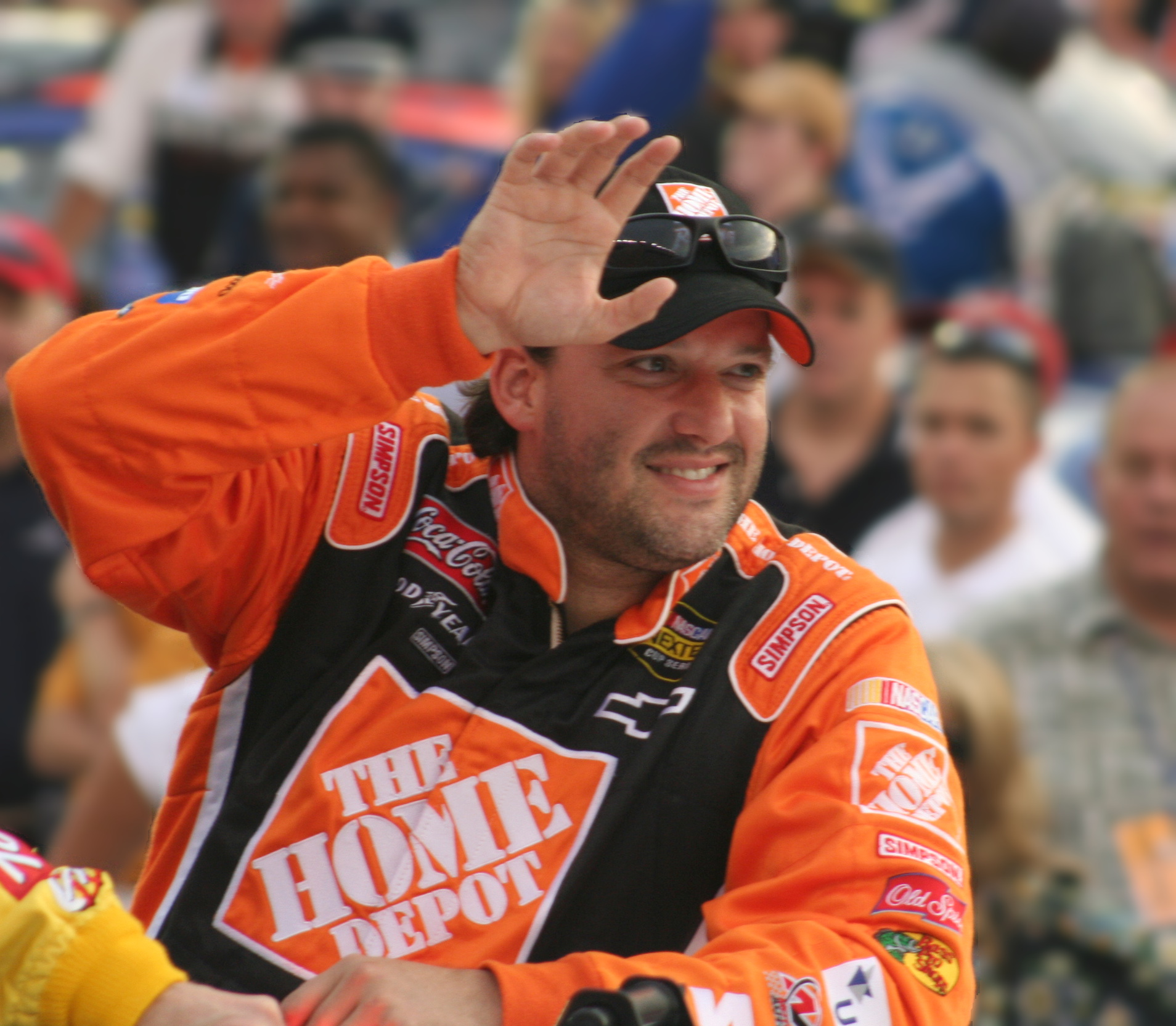
Tony Stewart

- John Andretti, racer (Indianapolis)
- Cannonball Baker, motorcycle and auto racer (Dearborn County)
- Chase Briscoe, racer (Mitchell)
- Ed Carpenter, IndyCar racer (Indianapolis)
- Conor Daly, IndyCar and GP2 racer (Noblesville)
- Derek Daly, Formula One racer (Noblesville; originally Irish)
- Bob Glidden, NHRA drag racer (Whiteland)
- Jeff Gordon, racer (Pittsboro)
- Justin Haley, racer (Winamac)
- Tracy Hines, racer (New Castle)
- Kenny Irwin Jr., racer (Indianapolis)
- Mel Kenyon, midget car racer, five Indy 500 top-five finishes (Lebanon)
- Steve Kinser, 20-time World of Outlaws sprint car champion (Bloomington)
- Ryan Newman, racer (South Bend)
- Tony Raines, racer (LaPorte)
- Tony Stewart, racer (Columbus)
- David Stremme, racer (South Bend)
- Howdy Wilcox, 1919 Indy 500 winner (Crawfordsville)

=== Soccer ===
- Rich Balchan, soccer player (Carmel)
- Damarcus Beasley, soccer player (Fort Wayne)
- Ray Gaddis, soccer player (Indianapolis)
- Lauren Holiday, soccer player (Indianapolis)
- Matt Reiswerg (born 1980), soccer player, coach, and administrator
- Todd Yeagley, Major League Soccer player (Bloomington)

=== Wrestlers, fighters, boxers ===
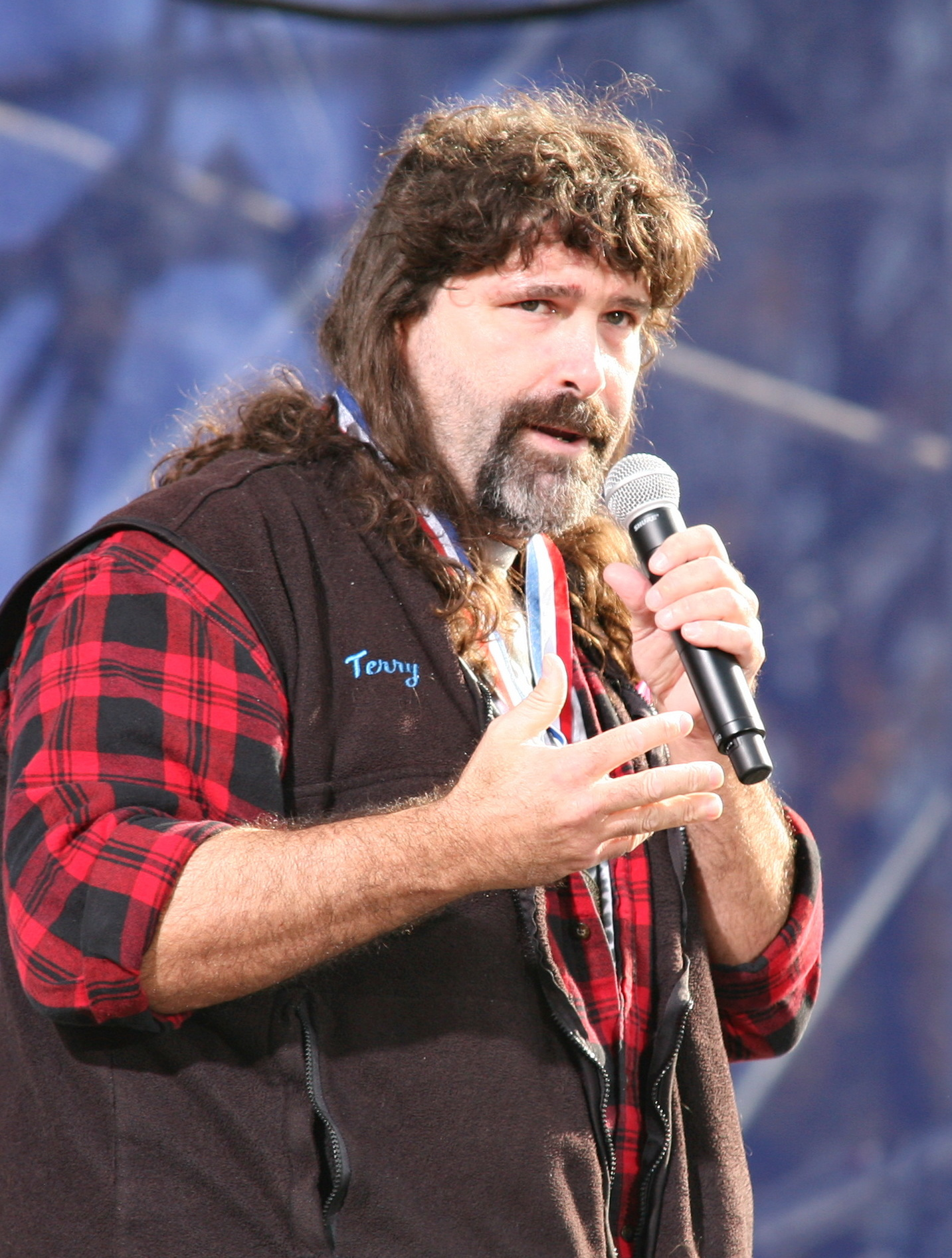
Mick Foley

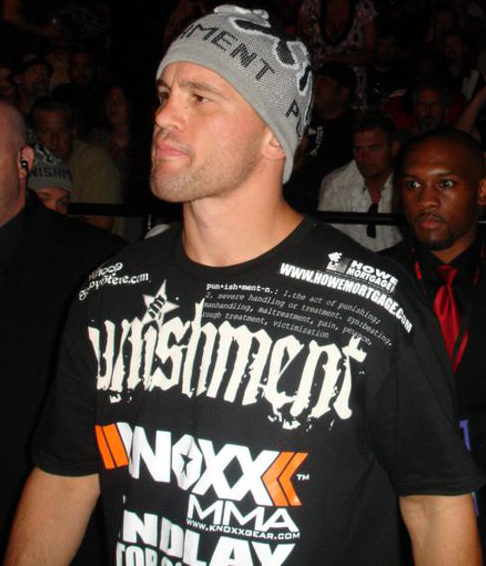
Chris Lytle

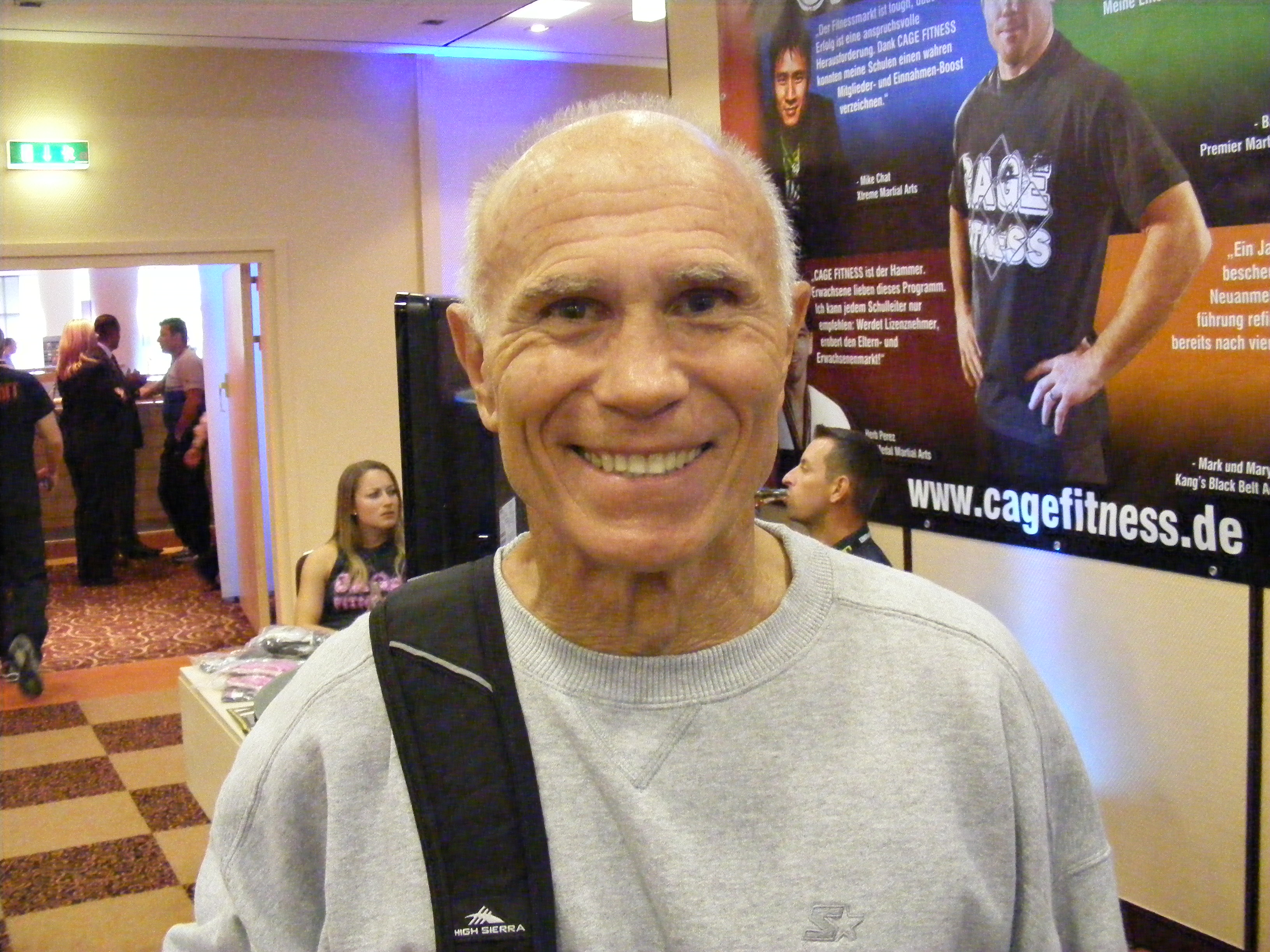
Bill Wallace

- William "Dick the Bruiser" Afflis, football player and professional wrestler (Delphi)
- Danny "the Damaja" Basham, professional wrestler (Seymour)
- B. Brian Blair, professional wrestler (Gary)
- Stephan Bonnar, UFC fighter (Munster)
- Robert Bowles, karate teacher (Fort Wayne)
- Harold Brazier, boxer (South Bend)
- Darren Elkins, UFC fighter (Portage)
- Jon Fitch, UFC fighter (Fort Wayne)
- Mick Foley, professional wrestler (born in Bloomington, but raised on Long Island)
- Terry Funk, professional wrestler (Hammond)
- Sarah Hildebrandt, Olympic freestyle wrestler (Granger)
- Marvin Johnson, boxer (Indianapolis)
- Julie Kedzie, mixed martial artist (Bloomington)
- Glenn Keeney, martial arts pioneer (Anderson)
- Chris Lytle, UFC fighter (Indianapolis)
- Stevan Mićić, Olympic freestyle wrestler (Cedar Lake)
- Craig Pumphrey, martial artist (New Albany)
- Sharmell Sullivan-Huffman, wrestling valet (Gary)
- Andrew Tate, kick-boxer (Goshen)
- Miguel Torres, bantamweight boxer and UFC fighter (East Chicago)
- Ultimate Warrior, professional wrestler (Crawfordsville)
- Bill Wallace, world karate champion (Muncie)
- Eddie Wineland, UFC fighter (Chesterton)
- Drake Younger, professional wrestler (Indianapolis)
- Tony Zale, boxer (Gary)

=== Other sports figures ===
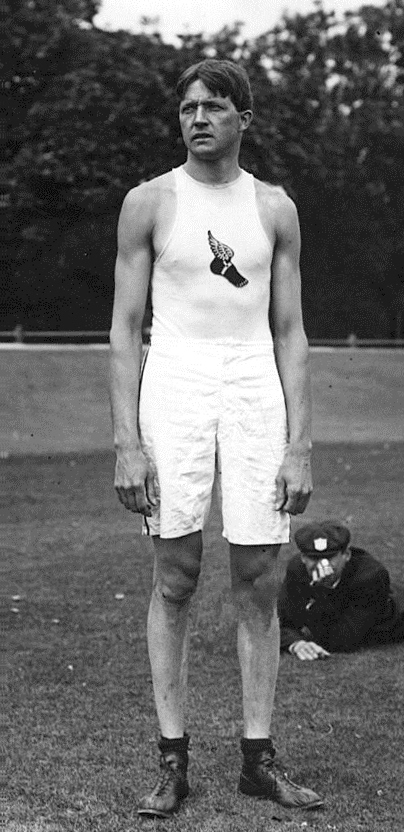
Ray Ewry

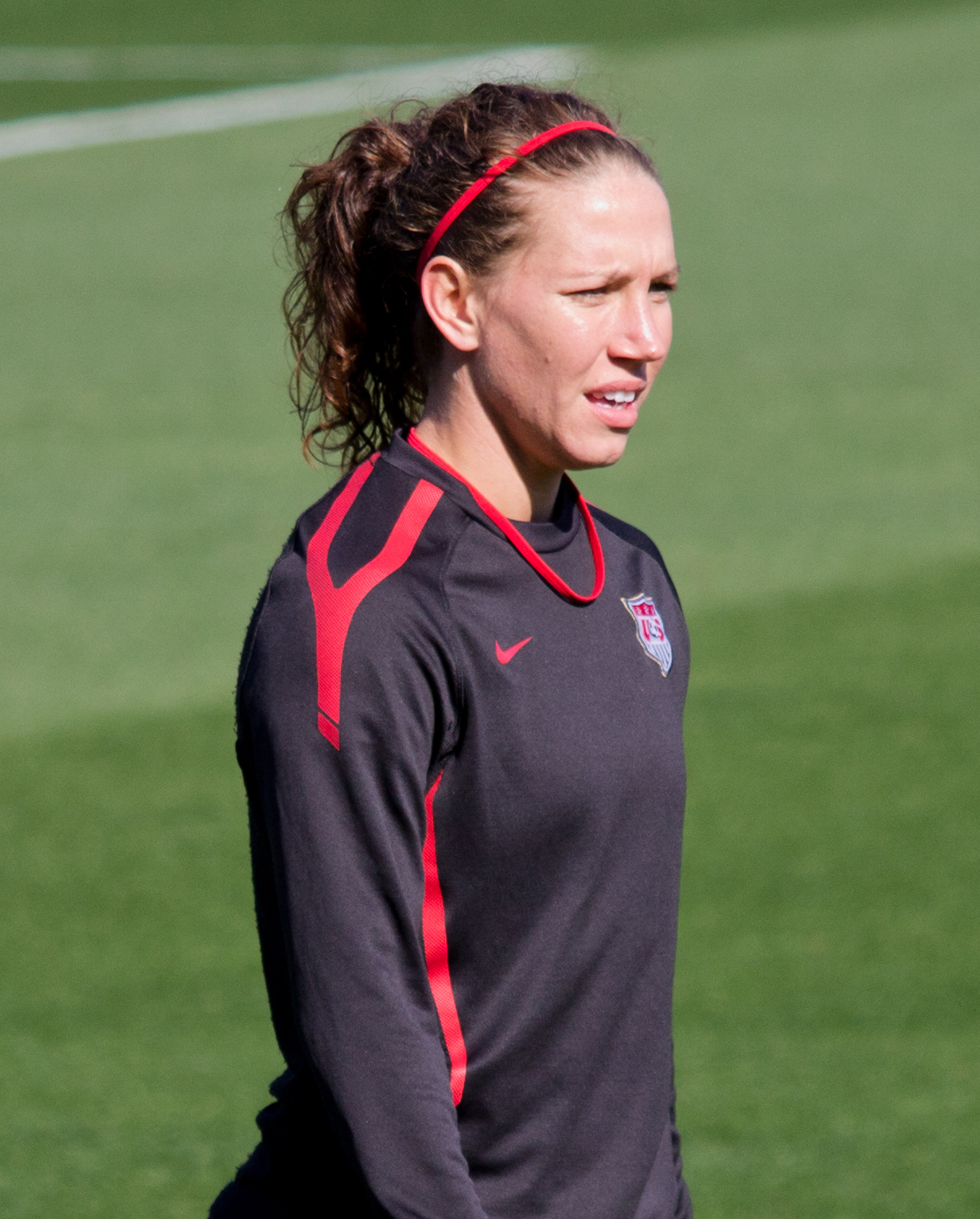
Lauren Holiday

- Mike Aulby, professional bowler (Indianapolis)
- Lloy Ball, Olympic volleyball player (born in Fort Wayne, raised in Woodburn)
- Amy Yoder Begley, Olympic long-distance runner (Kendallville)
- Greg Bell, athlete, gold medalist in long jump at 1956 Summer Olympics (Terre Haute)
- Lindsay Benko, 2000 Olympics swimmer (Elkhart)
- David Boudia, Olympic diver (Noblesville)
- Donald Brashear, hockey player (Bedford)
- Euphrasia Donnelly, swimmer, Olympic gold medalist (Indianapolis)
- Noah Droddy, distance runner
- Mary Beth Dunnichay, Olympic diver (Elwood)
- Ray Ewry, athlete, winner of eight Olympic gold medals (Lafayette)
- Charlie Finley, MLB owner of Kansas City/Oakland A's; NHL owner of Oakland/California Seals; ABA owner of Memphis Pros/Tams (LaPorte)
- Ford Frick, writer and commissioner of Major League Baseball (Wawaka)
- Nick Goepper, freeskier, Winter Olympics, Winter X Games (Lawrenceburg)
- Dan Harrigan, swimmer, 1976 Olympic bronze medalist (South Bend)
- Tony Hulman, owner of Indianapolis Motor Speedway (Terre Haute)
- Lauren Johnson, runner (Huntington)
- Lilly King, swimmer, two-time Olympian (Evansville)
- Mike LaRocco, motocross racer (Michigan City)
- Don Lash, long-distance runner (Bluffton and Auburn)
- Dan Patch, pacer (Oxford)
- Aron Ralston, mountain climber (Indianapolis)
- Bridget Sloan, Olympic gymnast, silver medalist (Pittsboro)
- Major Taylor, cyclist (Indianapolis)
- Mike Troy, swimmer, two-time Olympic gold medalist (Indianapolis)
- Sharon Wichman, swimmer, gold medalist at 1968 Summer Olympics (Fort Wayne)

== Business ==
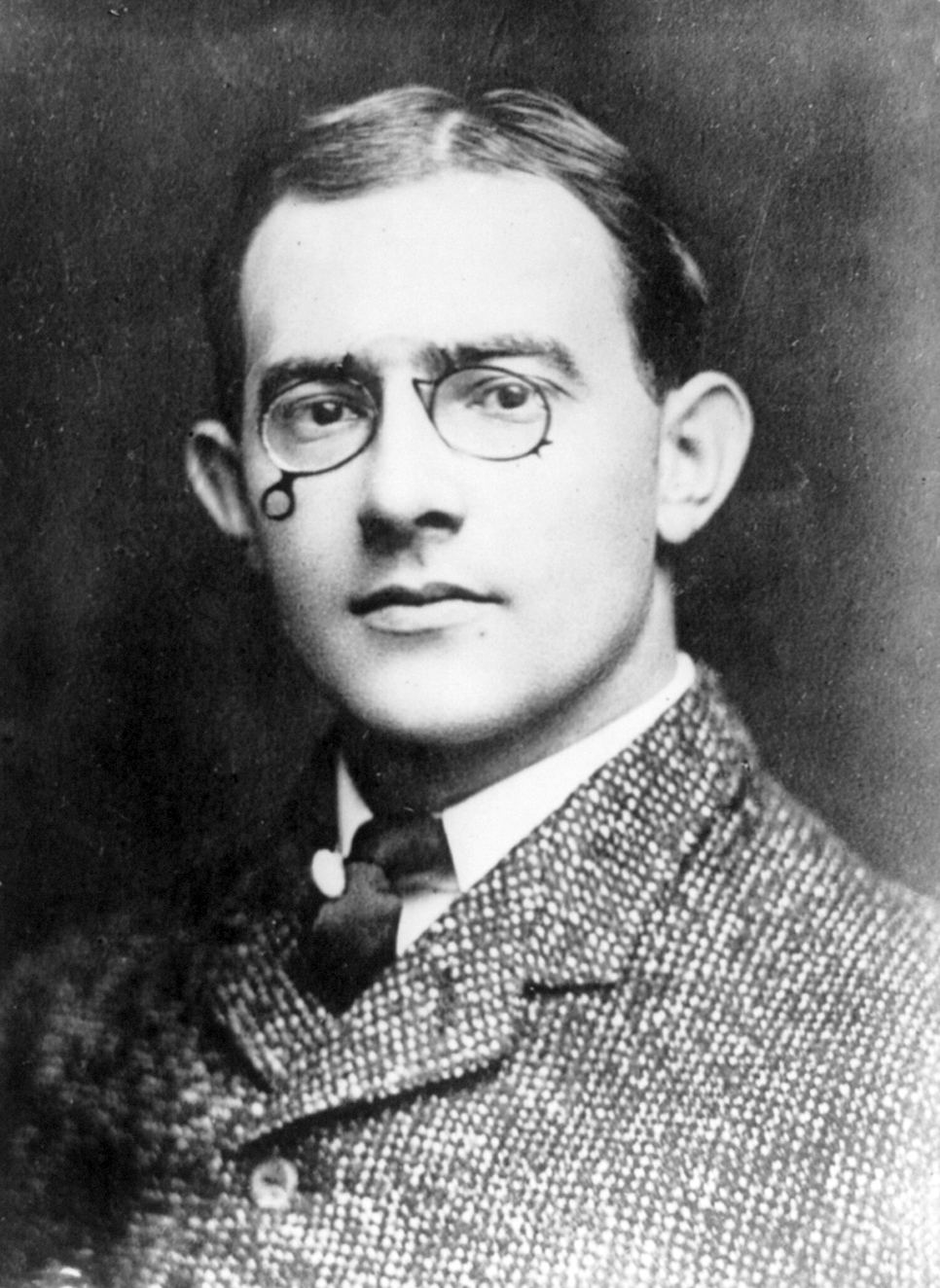
Carl G. Fisher

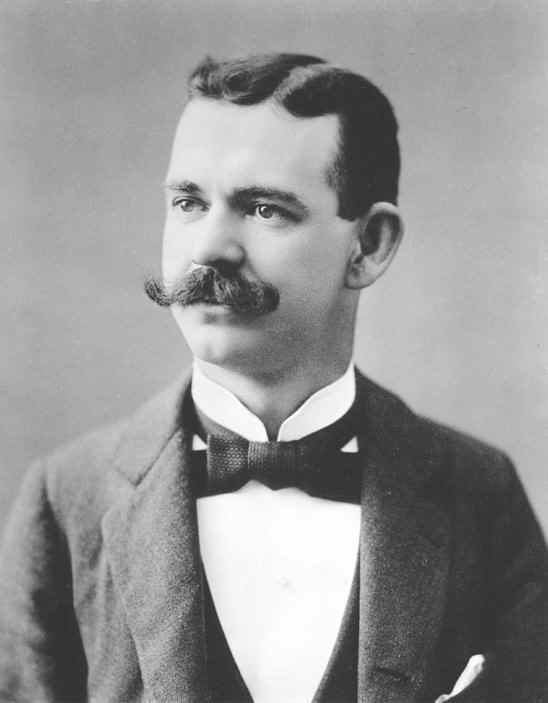
Alvah Curtis Roebuck

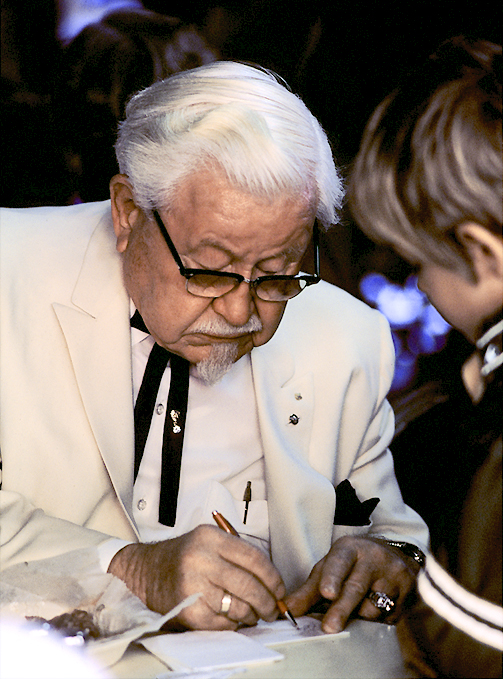
Colonel Sanders

- Steve Bellamy, sports and media businessman
- Bill Blass, fashion designer (Fort Wayne)
- Junior Bridgeman, former NBA player; CEO of Bridgeman Foods, world's second-largest Wendy's franchisee (East Chicago)
- Niki Christoff, political operative and business executive (Pittsboro)
- Charles G. Conn, manufacturer of band instruments (Elkhart)
- Sarah Iliff Davis (1820–1909), milliner, business woman, philanthropist (Richmond)
- Steve Ells, founder and CEO of Chipotle Mexican Grill (Indianapolis)
- Michael L. Eskew, former CEO of UPS (Vincennes)
- Carl G. Fisher, founder of the Indianapolis Motor Speedway and Prest-O-Lite (Greensburg)
- Richard Jordan Gatling, inventor of Gatling gun (Indianapolis)
- Halston, fashion designer (Evansville)
- Mark C. Honeywell, founder of Honeywell International, Inc. (Wabash)
- Gary Hoover, founder of Bookstop and Hoover's (Anderson)
- Edward Mead Johnson, co-founder of Johnson & Johnson; founder of Mead Johnson & Co. (Evansville)
- E.W. Kelley, founder of Steak 'n Shake restaurant chain and benefactor of Indiana University's Kelley School of Business (Sharpsville)
- Robert A. McDonald, chairman, president and CEO of Procter & Gamble (Gary)
- Norman Norell, fashion designer (Noblesville)
- Aaron Patzer, founder of Mint.com (Evansville)
- Orville Redenbacher, businessman, popcorn mogul (Brazil)
- Francis Joseph Reitz, banker and philanthropist (Evansville)
- Alvah Curtis Roebuck, co-founder of Sears, Roebuck and Company (Lafayette)
- Colonel Sanders, founder of KFC (Henryville)
- John Schnatter, founder and CEO of Papa John's Pizza (Jeffersonville)
- Stephen Sprouse, fashion designer and artist (Columbus)
- Eugene Stoner, firearms designer (Gosport)
- Madam C. J. Walker, entrepreneur, philanthropist, and political and social activist (Indianapolis)
- Fred Zollner, industrialist and founder of the Fort Wayne Pistons NBA franchise

== Education ==
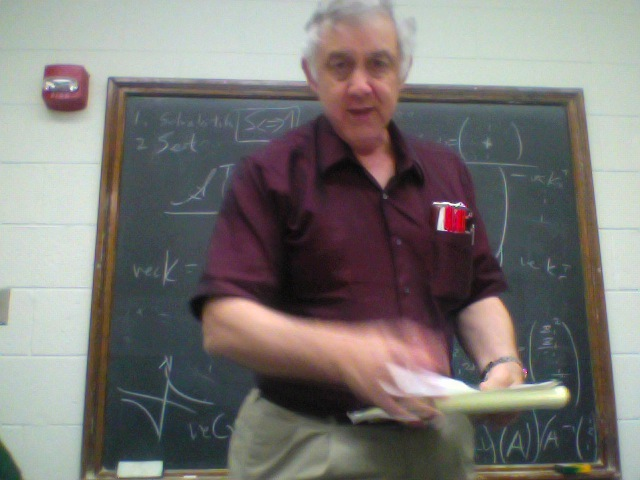
Charles Royal Johnson

- Enoch Albert Bryan, president, Vincennes University and Washington State University (Bloomington)
- Robert H. Ferrell, historian (Indiana University)
- Agnes Moore Fryberger, music educator, University of Louisville
- Albert Fredrick Ottomar Germann, physical chemist, university professor, and chemical entrepreneur (Peru)
- Frank Erhart Emmanuel Germann, physical chemist and university professor (Peru)
- Ray Ginger, Harvard professor in labor history and economic history; target of House Committee on Unamerican Activities, ending his academic career (Greencastle and Indianapolis)
- Charles Royal Johnson, mathematician, College of William & Mary professor (Elkhart)
- Frank Curry Mathers, physical chemist, professor, president of Electrochemical Society (Monroe County)
- William B. Pickett, historian (Rose-Hulman Institute of Technology, Terre Haute)
- George P. Smith II, Catholic University of America professor of Law (Wabash)
- Herman B Wells, president, Indiana University (Jamestown)

== Art, literature and media ==
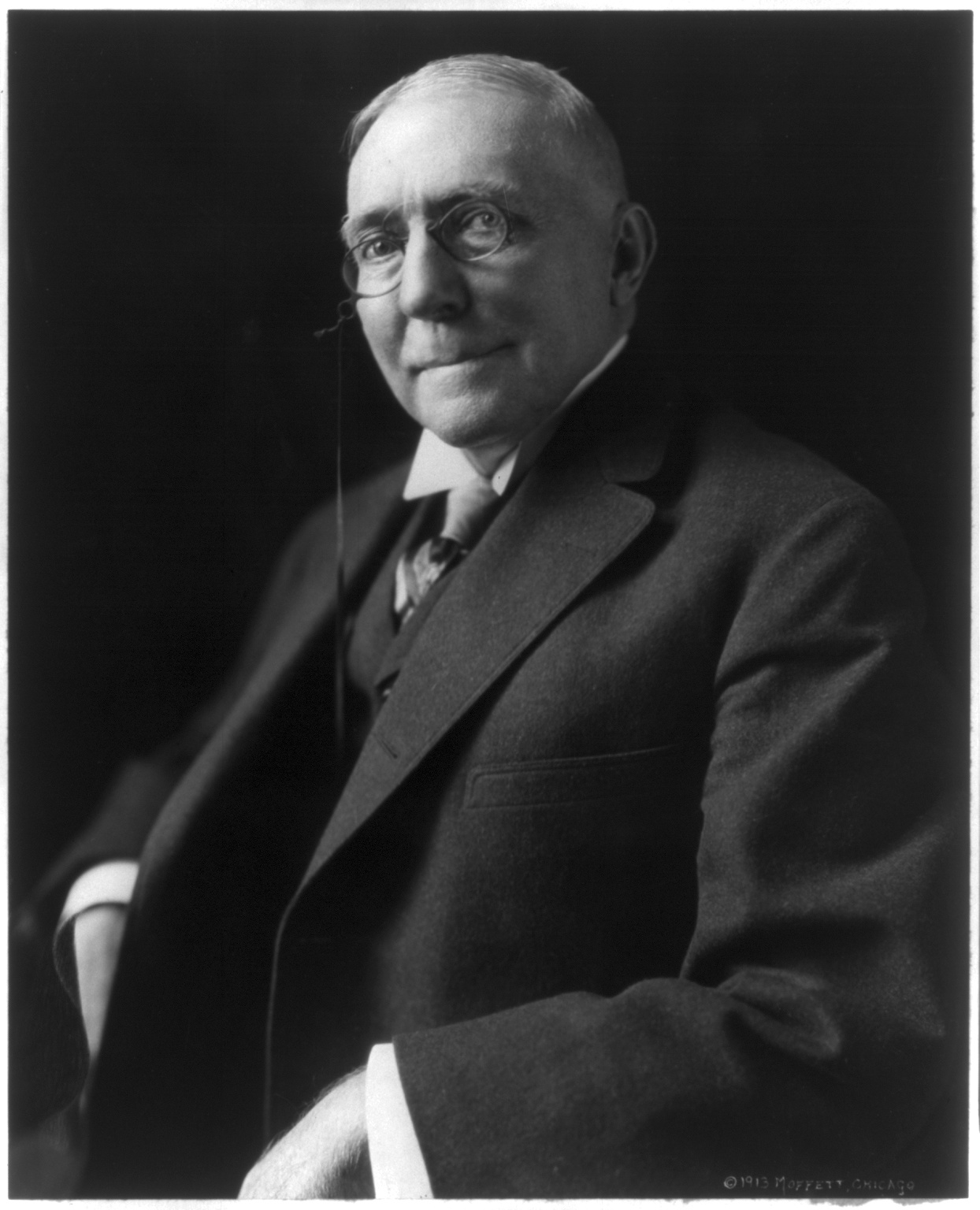
James Whitcomb Riley

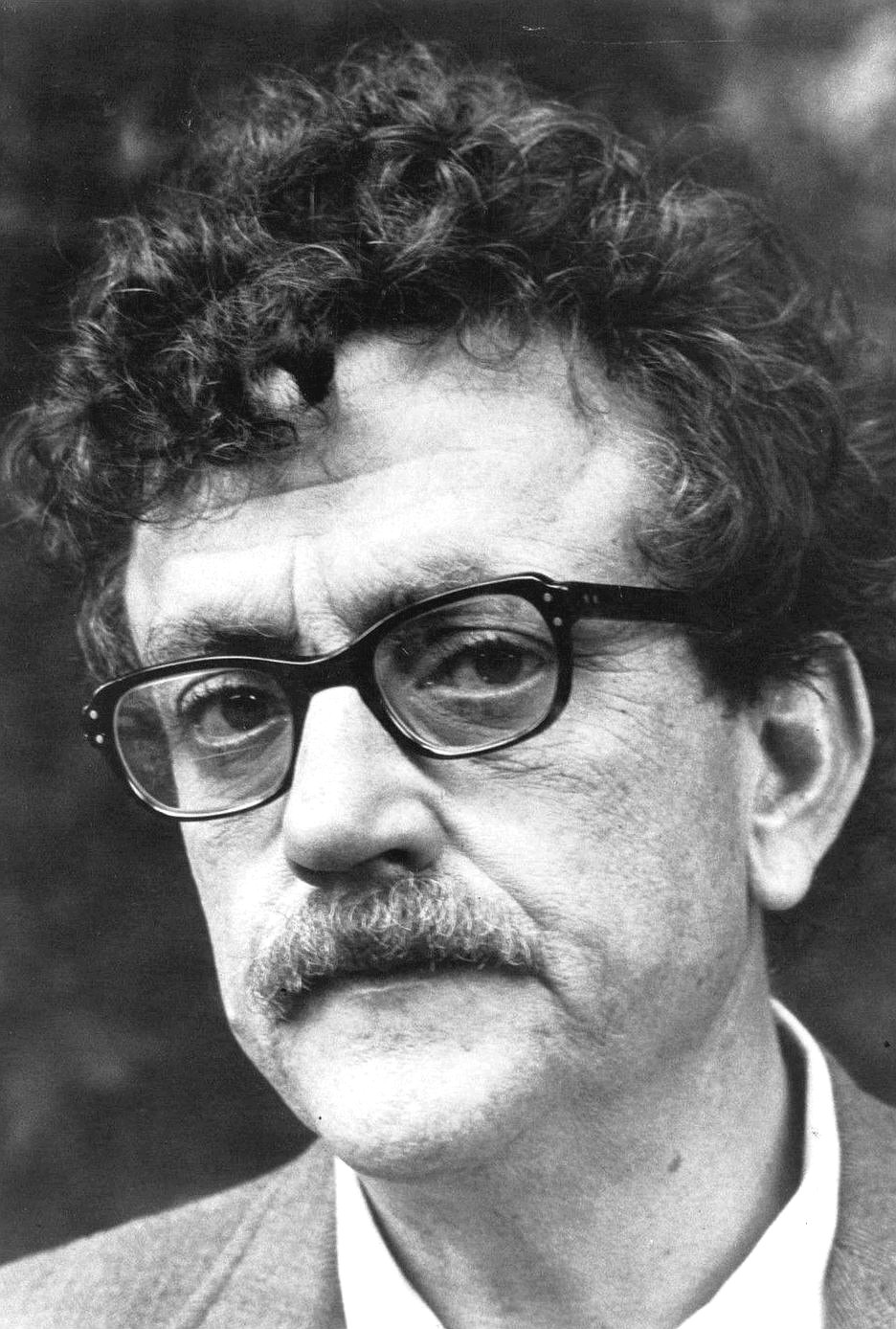
Kurt Vonnegut

- J. Ottis Adams, artist (Indianapolis)
- George Ade, author and journalist (Kentland)
- Monroe Anderson, journalist, author, was Chicago's press secretary for mayor Eugene Sawyer
- Marie Louise Andrews, writer, journalist (Bedford)
- Radley Balko, journalist, blogger (Greenfield)
- Charles A. Beard, historian (Knightstown)
- Albert J. Beveridge, historian (Indianapolis)
- Emily Lucas Blackall, writer, philanthropist (Salem)
- Allan Bloom, philosopher, classicist, academic (Indianapolis)
- Sarah T. Bolton, poet and women's rights activist
- Mae St. John Bramhall, actress, writer, poet (Richmond)
- Adelia Pope Branham, poet, writer (Greenfield)
- Norman Bridwell, author (Kokomo)
- Mary Blatchley Briggs, writer, social organizer (Valparaiso)
- Alice Williams Brotherton, poet, writer (Cambridge City)
- Bubba the Love Sponge, radio personality (Warsaw)
- Clarence Joseph Bulliet, art critic, journalist, author
- Meg Cabot, author (Bloomington)
- Jared Carter, poet (Elwood)
- Emily Thornton Charles, poet, journalist, newspaper founder, suffragist (Lafayette)
- William Merritt Chase, painter (Nineveh, Johnson County)
- Will Cuppy, humorist (Auburn)
- Jim Davis, cartoonist (Fairmount)
- Lloyd C. Douglas, author (Columbia City)
- Theodore Dreiser, author (Terre Haute)
- Amanda Ruter Dufour, poet (Jeffersonville)
- Marilyn Durham, author (Evansville)
- Mike "Doc" Emrick, sportscaster (La Fontaine)
- Mae Alice Engron, artist (Indianapolis)
- Clayton Eshleman, poet (Indianapolis)
- Anna Farquhar, writer, editor (Brookville)
- William Forsyth, artist (Indianapolis)
- Ford Frick, sportswriter, commissioner of Baseball (Wawaka)
- Bill Frink, sportscaster (Elkhart)
- Gary Gee, fine artist, muralist (Indianapolis)
- David Goodnow, television journalist (Vincennes)
- Michael Graves, architect, designer (Indianapolis)
- Art Green, painter (member of The Hairy Who)
- John Green, author (Indianapolis)
- Avani Gregg, social media personality (Brownsburg)
- Johnny Gruelle, illustrator of Raggedy Ann books (Indianapolis)
- Richard Gruelle, artist (Indianapolis)
- Alex Hall, author
- Mark Hampton, interior designer (Plainfield)
- Elizabeth Boynton Harbert, writer, lecturer, philanthropist (Crawfordsville)
- David Haugh, sportswriter (North Judson)
- Kin Hubbard, humorist, writer, cartoonist (Indianapolis)
- Robert Indiana, artist (New Castle)
- Steve Inskeep, journalist, radio host (Carmel)
- Ross Lockridge Jr., author (Bloomington)
- Jason Matheson, radio personality on KTMY
- John T. McCutcheon, cartoonist (Lafayette)
- Edward J. Meeman, journalist (Evansville)
- Dale Messick, comic strip artist (South Bend)
- Midwxst, rapper and singer (Carmel)
- Minnie Myrtle Miller, writer, poet (Brookville)
- Bruce Nauman, artist (Fort Wayne)
- Meredith Nicholson, author (Crawfordsville)
- Dave Niehaus, sportscaster (Princeton)
- Jack Olsen, journalist and author (Indianapolis)
- Bill Peet, author, Disney artist, Caldecott Honor recipient (Grandview)
- Jon Petrovich, television executive (Gary)
- Edith Pfau, painter, sculptor, art educator (Jasper)
- David Graham Phillips, journalist, novelist (Madison)
- Gene Stratton Porter, author (Wabash County)
- Nelson Poynter, publisher (Sullivan)
- Ernie Pyle, newsman, legendary war correspondent during World War II (Dana)
- Emily Lee Sherwood Ragan, writer, journalist (Madison)
- Frank Reynolds, television journalist (East Chicago)
- Kyng Rhodes, artist (Indianapolis)
- E. A. Richardson, poet, first Poet Laureate of Indiana (Pike County)
- James Whitcomb Riley, poet (Greenfield)
- William Edouard Scott, artist (Indianapolis)
- Zerna Sharp, author and educator (Frankfort)
- Michael Shelden, author of George Orwell: Ten Animal Farm Letters to His Agent, Leonard Moore (Terre Haute)
- Carrie M. Shoaff, artist, potter, writer, correspondent (Huntington)
- Will Shortz, editor of The New York Times crossword puzzle and host of the puzzle segment on National Public Radio's Weekend Edition Sunday (Crawfordsville)
- David Smith, Abstract Expressionist sculptor (Decatur)
- Amy Spindler, journalist (Michigan City)
- Otto Stark, artist (Indianapolis)
- T. C. Steele, artist (Indianapolis)
- Evaleen Stein, poet, writer, limner (Lafayette)
- Rex Stout, author, creator of Nero Wolfe (Noblesville)
- Maria Straub, writer, hymnwriter (DeKalb County)
- Martina Swafford, poet (Terre Haute)
- Booth Tarkington, Pulitzer Prize-winning author of Alice Adams, Seventeen, and The Magnificent Ambersons (Indianapolis)
- Angeline Teal, poet, novelist, short story writer (Kendallville)
- Lois Main Templeton, artist (Indianapolis)
- James Alexander Thom, author (Indianapolis, Brown County)
- E. S. L. Thompson, poet, writer (Vevay)
- Kurt Vonnegut, author (Indianapolis)
- Lew Wallace, author (Crawfordsville)
- Jason Whitlock, sportswriter (Indianapolis)
- Mary Holloway Wilhite, physician, philanthropist, suffragist, women's rights activist, writer (near Crawfordsville)
- J. N. Williamson, author (Noblesville)
- Marguerite Young, poet, author, critic (Indianapolis)

== Science and medicine ==
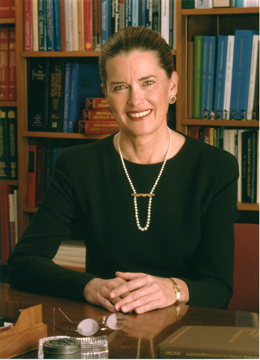
Jane E. Henney

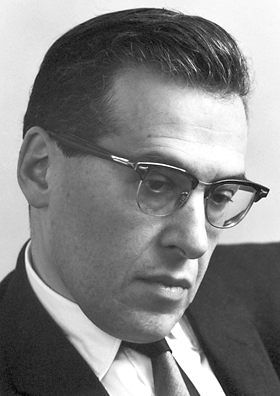
Julian Schwinger

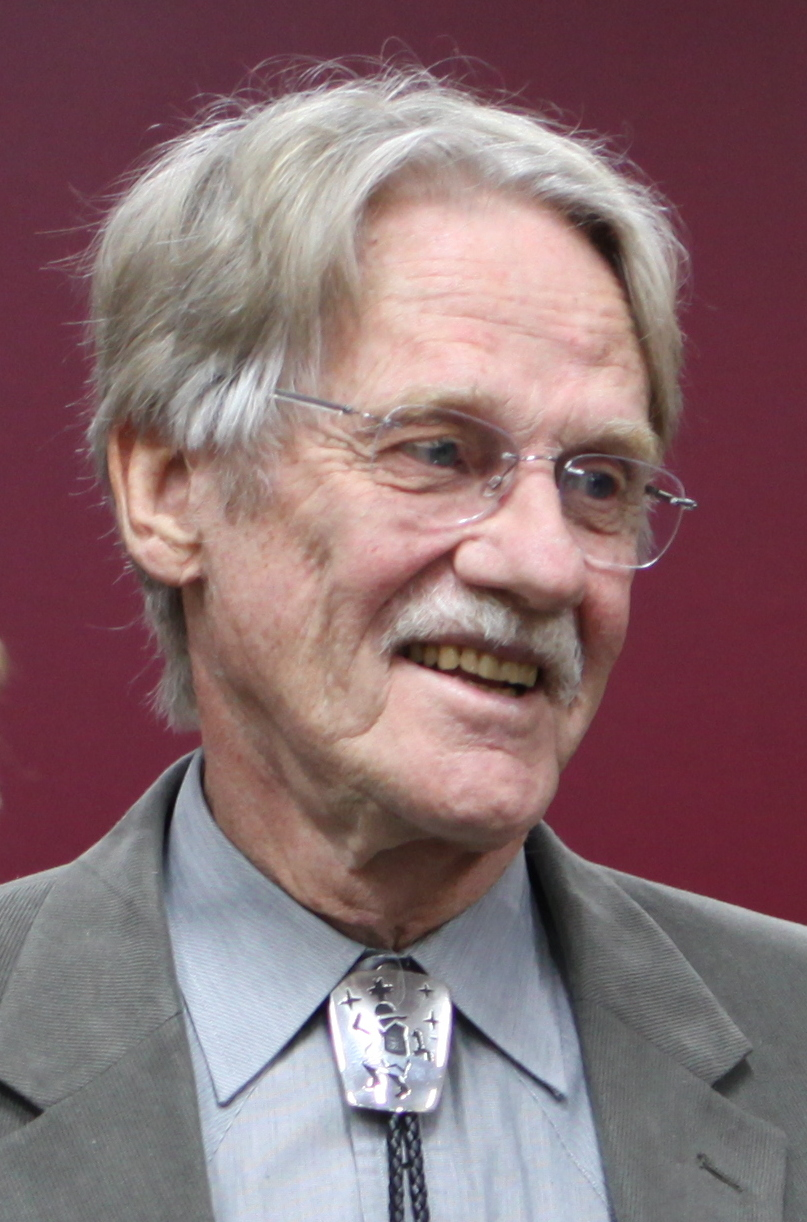
Vernon L. Smith

- Gordon Allport, psychologist, one of the founding figures of personality psychology (Montezuma)
- Philip Warren Anderson, Nobel Prize in Physics (Indianapolis)
- Herbert C. Brown, Nobel Prize in Chemistry (West Lafayette)
- Roy Cizek, inventor and pioneer in sound reproduction engineering (Terre Haute)
- Larry M. Davis, forensic psychiatrist, pioneer of the criminal insanity defense (Indianapolis)
- David Deming, geologist and geophysicist (Terre Haute)
- Katharine Jane Densford, director of the University of Minnesota School of Nursing, provided important nursing leadership during World War II
- James Bert Garner, chemist, inventor of the gas mask (Lebanon)
- Alice Hamilton, physician, pioneer in industrial medicine, environmental toxicology] (Fort Wayne)
- Elwood Haynes, inventor of stainless steel (Kokomo)
- Jane E. Henney, first female commissioner of the Food and Drug Administration (Woodburn)
- C. Francis Jenkins, inventor of the motion picture projector and television (Richmond)
- Gene Likens, discovered acid rain in North America (Pierceton)
- Colonel Eli Lilly, founder of Eli Lilly (Indianapolis)
- Salvador E. Luria, Nobel Prize in Medicine (Bloomington)
- Robert Staughton Lynd, sociology, directed first Middletown studies (New Albany)
- Ben Roy Mottelson, Nobel Prize in Physics (West Lafayette)
- Hermann Joseph Muller, Nobel Prize in Medicine (Bloomington)
- Elinor Ostrom, first woman to win Nobel Prize in Economics (Bloomington)
- E. J. Pennington, inventor and promoter of many mechanical devices (Moores Hill)
- Edward Mills Purcell, Nobel Prize in Physics (West Lafayette)
- George Andrew Reisner, archaeologist of ancient Egypt and Palestine (Indianapolis)
- Paul A. Samuelson, first American to win the Nobel Prize in Economics (Gary)
- Ada Estelle Schweitzer, physician and public health advocate (La Grange County)
- Julian Schwinger, Nobel Prize in Physics (West Lafayette)
- Bob Sheets, meteorologist; director of the National Hurricane Center 1987–1995 (Fairmount)
- Vernon Smith, Nobel Prize in Economics (West Lafayette)
- Joseph Stiglitz, Nobel Prize in Economics (Gary)
- Lewis Terman, psychologist, inventor of the Stanford-Binet I.Q. test and pioneer in educational psychology (Johnson County)
- Harold Urey, Nobel Prize in Chemistry (Walkerton)
- James D. Watson, Nobel Prize in Medicine (Bloomington)
- Eric F. Wieschaus, evolutionary developmental biologist, Nobel Prize in Medicine (South Bend)
- Harvey Washington Wiley, first Indiana State Chemist, USDA chemist, and "father of Pure Food and Drug Act"
- R. M. Wilson, mathematician (Gary)

== Aviation and space ==
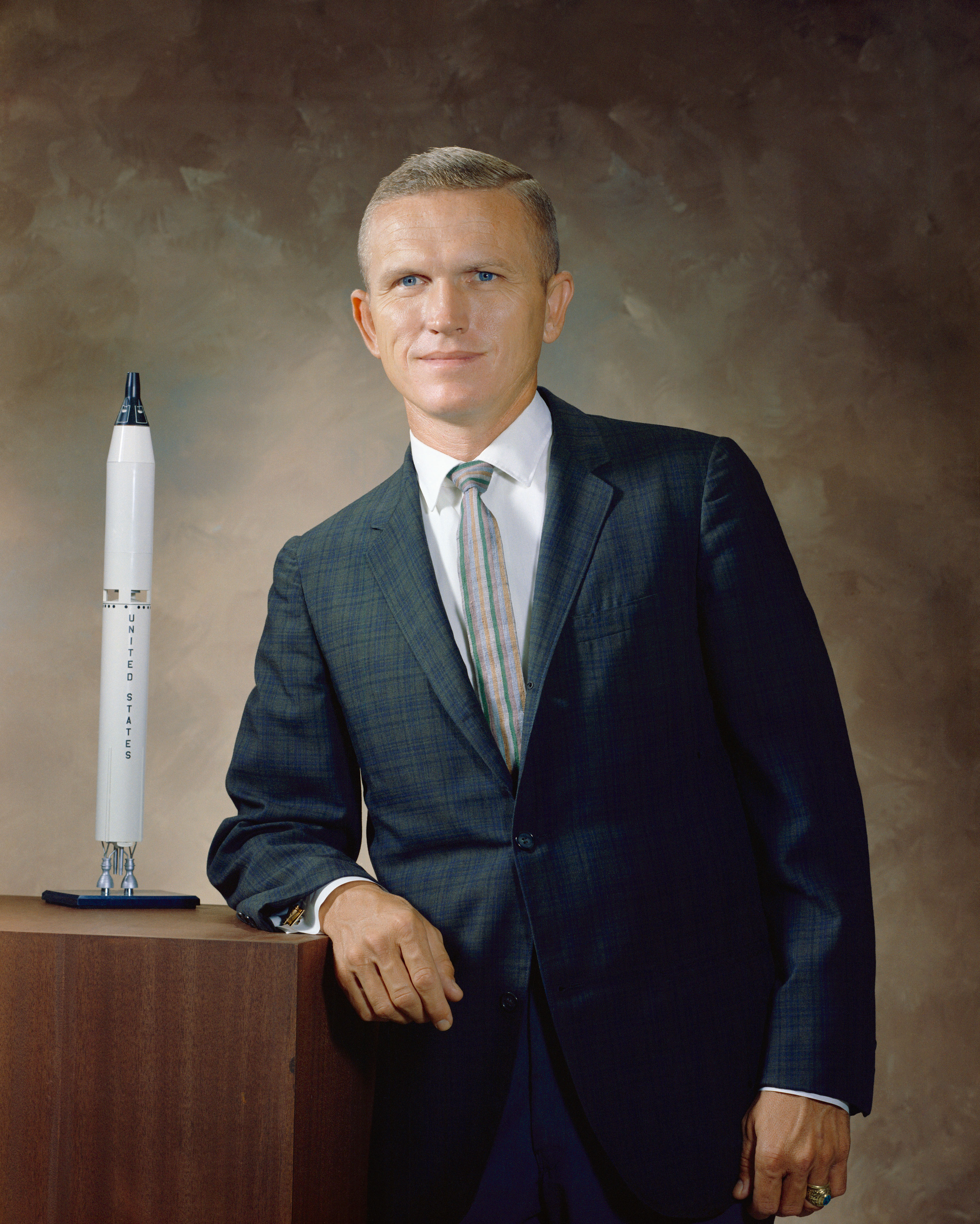
Frank Borman

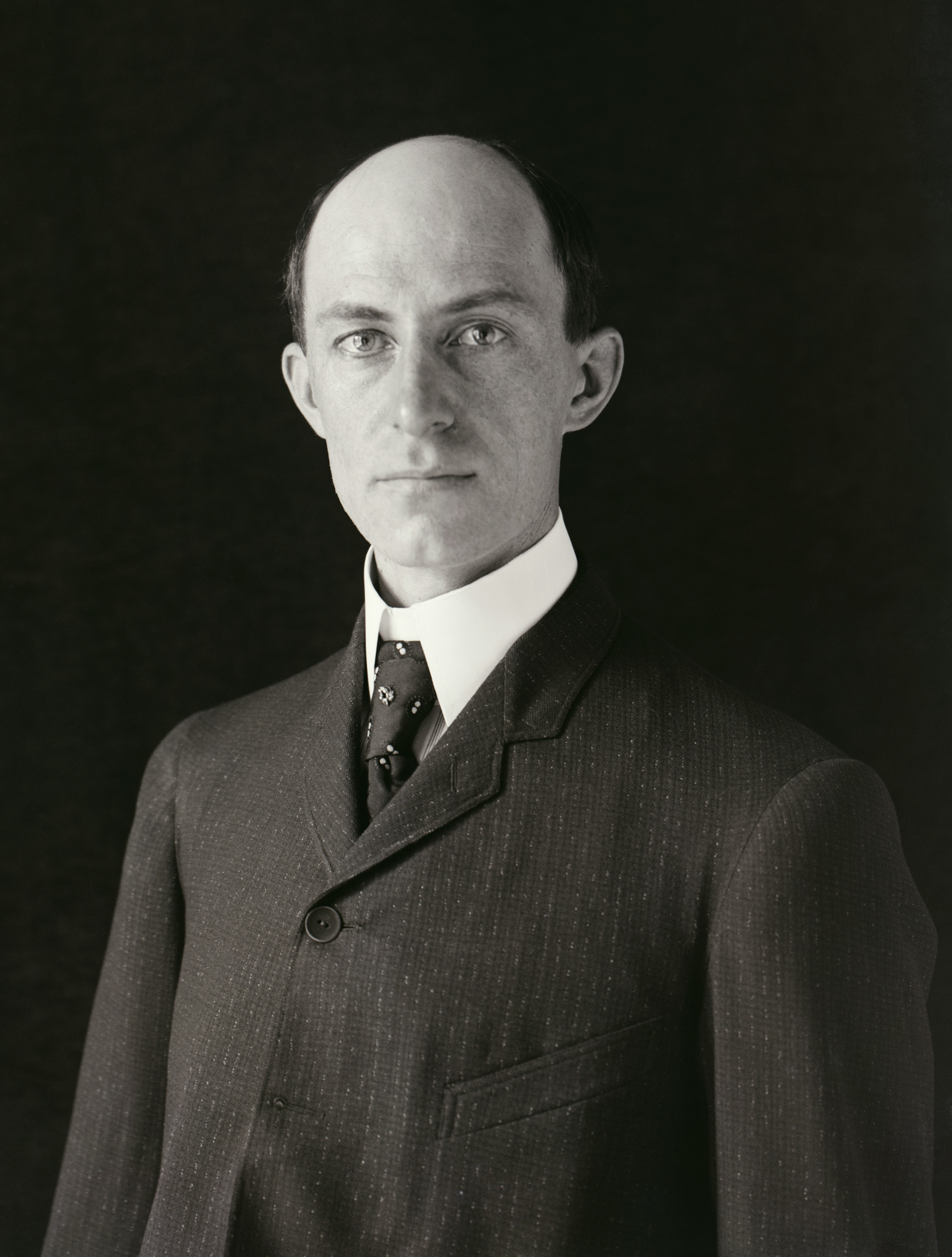
Wilbur Wright

- Joseph P. Allen, astronaut (Crawfordsville)
- Lawrence Bell, aviator (Mentone)
- Frank Borman, astronaut (Gary)
- Kenneth Bowersox, astronaut (Bedford)
- Mark N. Brown, astronaut (Valparaiso)
- Anthony W. England, astronaut (Indianapolis)
- Kevin A. Ford, astronaut (Montpelier)
- Gus Grissom, astronaut (Mitchell)
- Margaret Ringenberg, aviator (Fort Wayne)
- Jerry Ross, astronaut (Crown Point)
- Janice E. Voss, astronaut (South Bend)
- Charles D. Walker, astronaut (Bedford)
- David Wolf, astronaut (Indianapolis)
- Wilbur Wright, inventor (Millville)

== Religious and spiritual figures ==
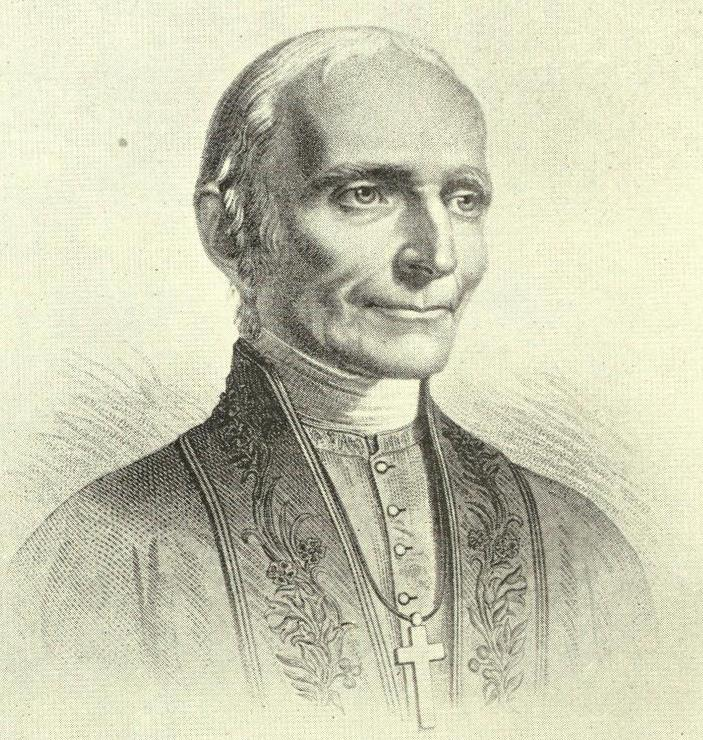
Simon Bruté

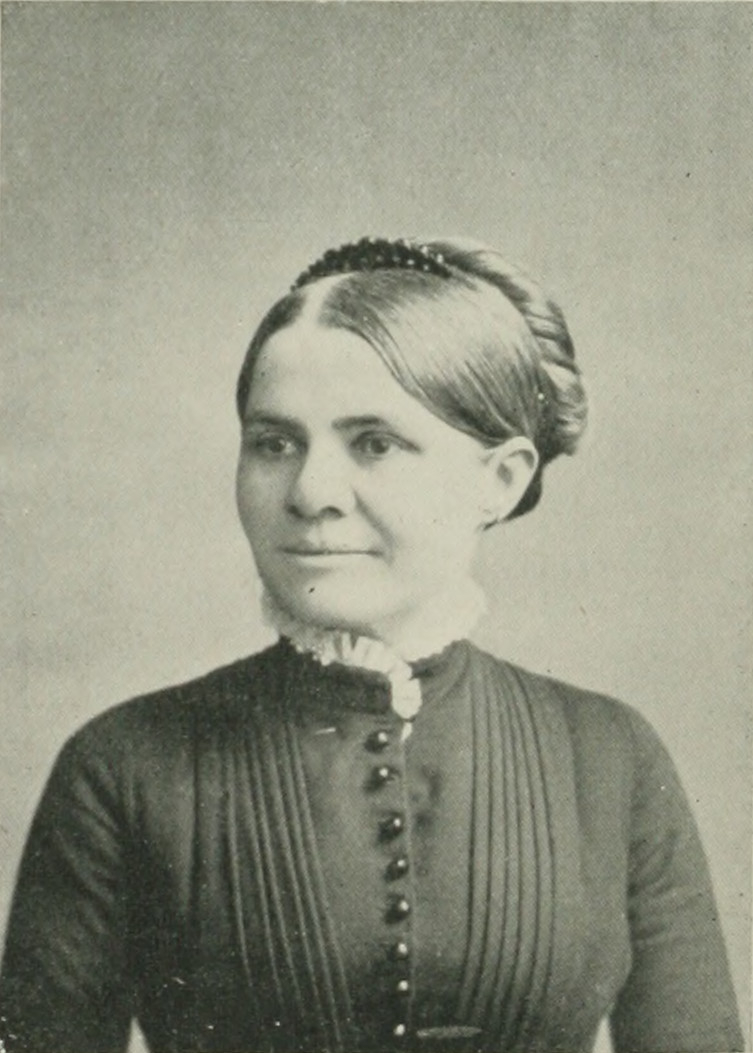
Esther G. Frame

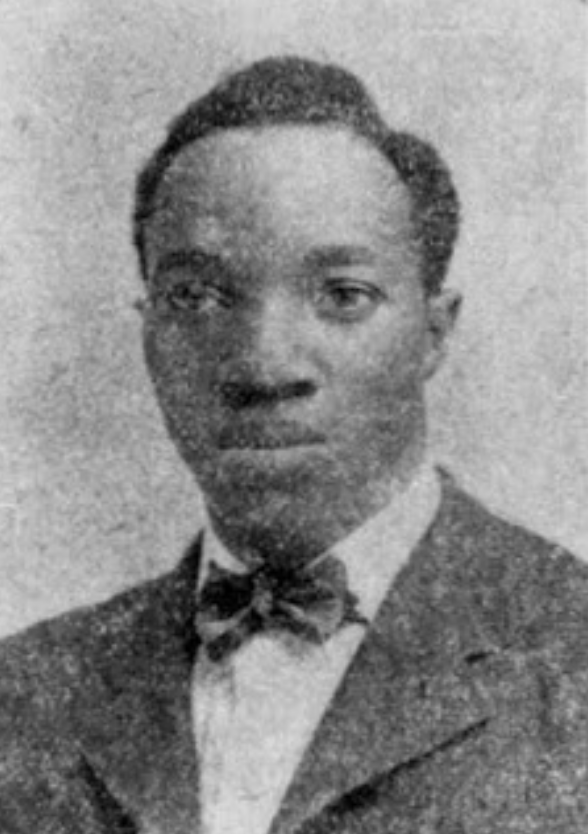
Garfield Thomas Haywood

- Irvin Baxter Jr., Pentecostal pastor (Richmond)
- Simon Bruté, Catholic missionary and bishop (Vincennes)
- Anthony Deydier, Catholic missionary (Evansville)
- David C. Fisher, Conservative Congregational pastor (Warsaw)
- Esther G. Frame, Quaker minister and evangelist (Washington)
- Benjamin Franklin, figure in the Restoration Movement (Anderson)
- Hobart Freeman, charismatic preacher (Kosciusko County)
- Jim Gilles, campus preacher (Evansville)
- Jeff Godwin, preacher and author (Bloomington)
- Ted Haggard, evangelical pastor (Yorktown)
- Garfield Thomas Haywood, pastor and songwriter (Greencastle)
- Jack Hyles, Baptist preacher (Hammond)
- Gerald Archie Mangun, Pentecostal pastor (La Paz)
- Isaac McCoy, Baptist missionary (Vincennes)
- Lee Roberson, Baptist preacher (English)
- Mary Simpson, Episcopalian priest (Evansville)
- Jed Smock, campus preacher (Terre Haute)
- Edward Sorin, Catholic priest (Notre Dame)
- Lester Sumrall, Pentecostal pastor (South Bend)
- Robert Thieme, non-denominational Christian pastor (Fort Wayne)
- Ambrose Jessup Tomlinson, Pentecostal pastor (Westfield)
- Wilbur Glenn Voliva, evangelist (Merom)
- Mike Warnke, evangelist and comedian (Evansville)
- Warren W. Wiersbe, pastor and writer (East Chicago)
- David Wilkerson, evangelical pastor (Hammond)
- Milton Wright, United Brethren bishop (Rushville Township)

== Notorious and infamous Hoosiers ==
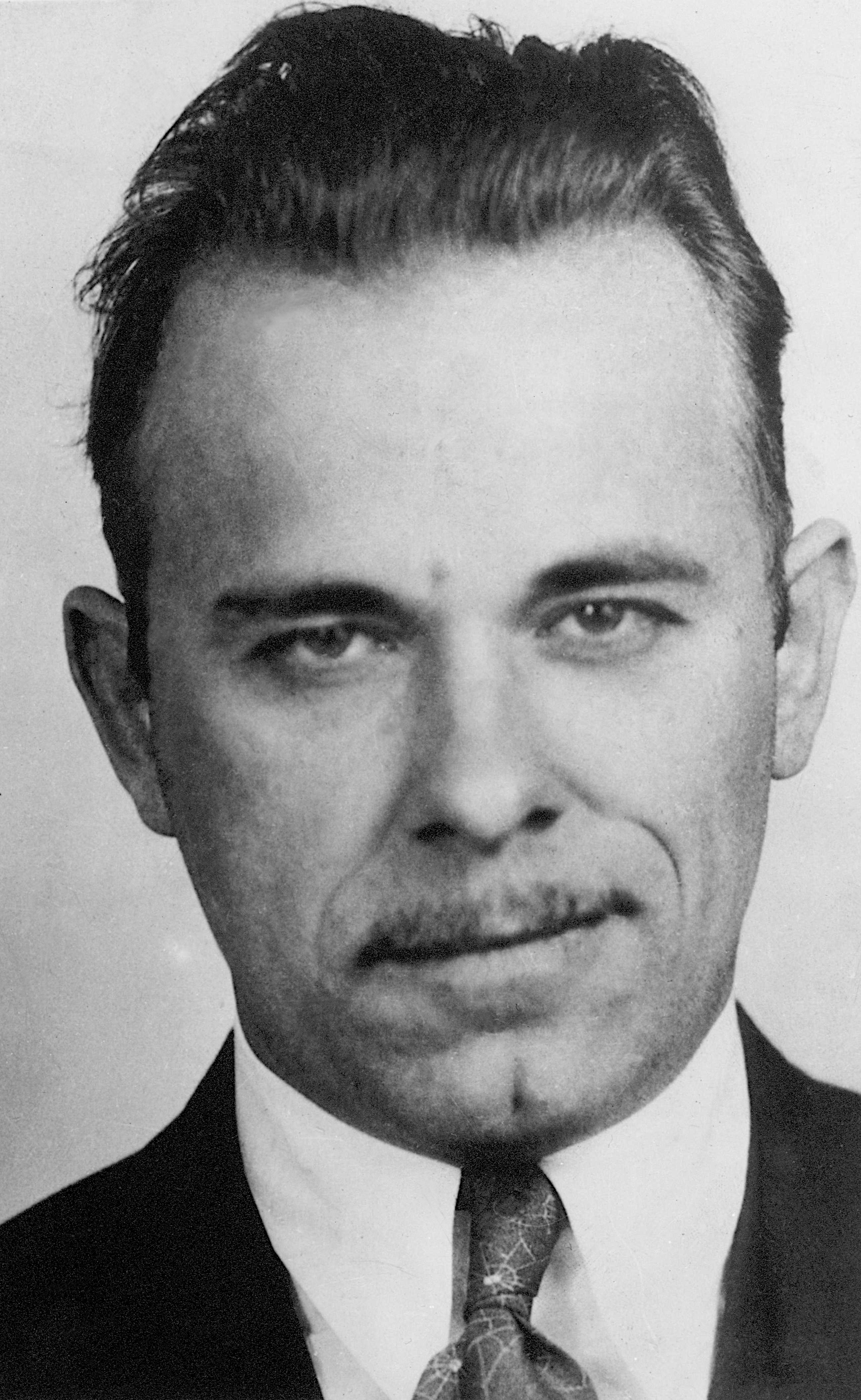
John Dillinger

- Michael Alig, founding member of Club Kids, murderer (South Bend)
- Lowell Amos, murderer (Anderson)
- Gertrude Baniszewski, murderer (Indianapolis)
- Sam Bass, train robber (Mitchell)
- Herb Baumeister, serial killer (Westfield)
- Curly Bill Brocius, outlaw, nemesis of Wyatt Earp (Crawfordsville)
- John Dillinger, bank robber (Mooresville)
- Jared Fogle, former spokesman for Subway restaurants and convicted sex offender (Indianapolis)
- Belle Gunness, serial killer (La Porte)
- Jimmy Hoffa, labor-union leader (Brazil)
- Jim Jones, cult founder/leader (Richmond)
- Steven Judy, murderer (Indianapolis)
- Tony Kiritsis, hostage-taker (Indianapolis)
- Harry Pierpont, Prohibition era gangster (Muncie)
- Reno Brothers, murderers, committed the first three peacetime train robberies in U.S. history (Rockford)
- Johnny Ringo, gunfighter (Greens Fork)
- D.C. Stephenson, Grand Dragon of the Ku Klux Klan, convicted murderer and rapist (Evansville)
- Eric Justin Toth, formerly wanted by the FBI under accusations of possessing and producing child pornography; replaced Osama Bin Laden on FBI's Ten Most Wanted list (Highland)
- Homer Van Meter, criminal and bank robber (Fort Wayne)

== Other ==
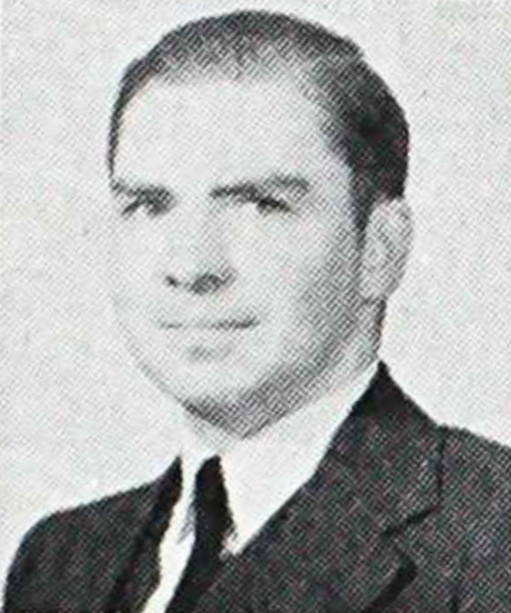
Robert Shields

- David Camm, man who was wrongfully convicted of the murder of his family (Georgetown)
- Dilley sextuplets, the first surviving set of sextuplets in North America
- Peter Kassig, aid worker, taken hostage and ultimately beheaded by the Islamic State (Indianapolis)
- David E. Kendall, attorney (Sheridan)
- Benjaman Kyle (born 1948), famous for having severe amnesia
- Sylvia Likens, murder victim (Indianapolis)
- Madge Oberholtzer, murder victim (Clay City)
- Shanda Sharer, murder victim (New Albany)
- Robert Shields, minister and teacher who wrote a 37.5-million-word diary, possibly the longest ever written (Seymour)

== See also ==
- List of Indiana University alumni
- List of Indiana suffragists
