= Little Orphan Annie (disambiguation) =

Little Orphan Annie is the name of an American comic strip begun in 1924.

Little Orphan Annie may also refer to:

- Little Orphan Annie (radio series), an American radio drama series based on the comic strip
- Little Orphant Annie (1918 film)
- Little Orphan Annie (1932 film), a 1932 American film based on the comic strip, starring Mitzi Green
- Little Orphan Annie (1938 film), a 1938 American film based on the comic strip, starring Ann Gillis

== See also ==
- "Little Orphant Annie", an 1885 poem written by James Whitcomb Riley
