= Richard Gruelle =

American painter (1851–1914)

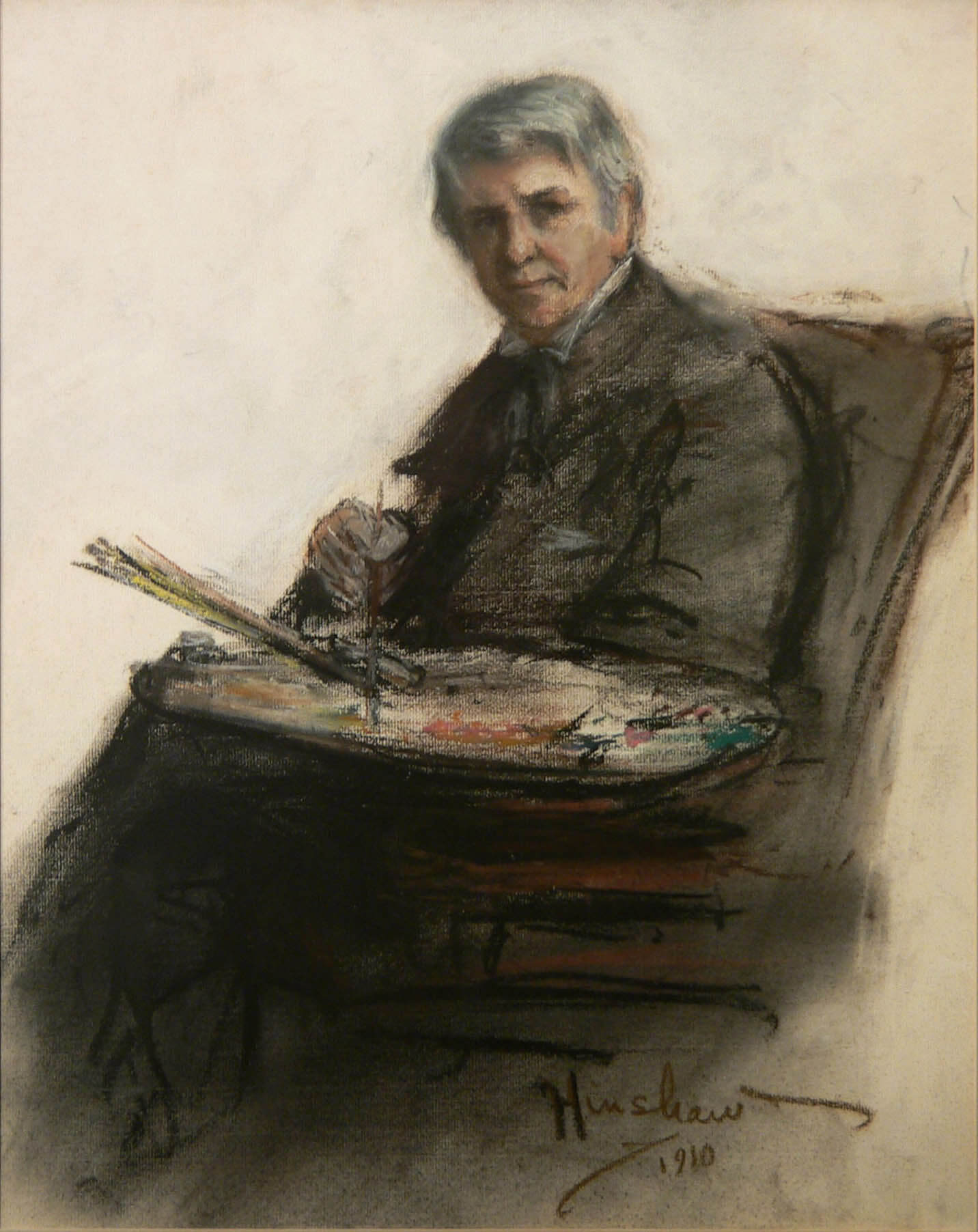
- Portrait of Richard B. Gruelle, by Glenn Cooper Henshaw. 1910
- Born: Richard Buckner Gruelle; February 22, 1851; Cynthiana, Kentucky, United States
- Died: November 8, 1914 (aged 63); Indianapolis, Indiana, United States
- Resting place: Crown Hill Cemetery and Arboretum, Section 35, Lot 213; 39.8204681°N 86.1678519°W
- Known for: Painting
- Notable work: The Canal—Morning Effect
- Movement: American Impressionism
- Spouse: Alice Benton
- Children: 1 daughter, 3 sons, including Johnny Gruelle (artist)

Richard Buckner Gruelle (February 22, 1851 – November 8, 1914) was an American Impressionist painter, illustrator, and author, who is best known as one of the five Hoosier Group artists. Gruelle's masterwork is The Canal—Morning Effect (1894), a painting of the Indianapolis, Indiana skyline, but he is also known for his watercolors and marine landscapes of the Gloucester, Massachusetts, area. In 1891 Indiana poet James Whitcomb Riley commissioned Gruelle to illustrate two of his more notable poems, "When the Frost is on the Punkin'" and "The Old Swimmin' Hole," which were published in Neighborly Poems (1891). Gruelle is also the author of Notes, Critical and Biographical: Collection of W. T. Walters (1895), which provides a detailed description of Baltimore industrialist William Thompson Walters's extensive art collection.

Born in Cynthiana, Kentucky, the self-taught artist is the only one of the Hoosier Group painters without European training. Gruelle grew up in Arcola, Illinois, apprenticed as a house and sign painter, and established his first studio in Decatur, Illinois, where he began by painting portraits and domestic scenes before turning to landscapes. Gruelle relocated to Indianapolis, Indiana, in 1882 to pursue a career as a full-time landscape painter. Gruelle also made extended sketching trips to the East Coast of the United States. Gruelle and his wife moved to Norwalk, Connecticut, in 1910. Gruelle was a member of several arts organizations, including the Art Association of Indianapolis (forerunner to the present-day Indianapolis Museum of Art), the New Canaan Society of Artists, the Society of Western Artists, and the Knockers, an East Coast art group. Although he only occasionally exhibited his art in national exhibitions, one a notable exception was the Louisiana Purchase Exposition at Saint Louis, Missouri, in 1904.

Gruelle's eldest son, Johnny Gruelle (1880–1938), became a commercial artist, illustrator, and author, who is best known as the creator of the Raggedy Ann doll and related books and illustrations.

== Early life and education ==
Richard Buckner Gruelle was born in Cynthiana, Kentucky, on February 22, 1851, to John Beauchamps Gruelle, a tanner, and Prudence (Moore) Gruelle. He was among the youngest of the family's eleven children (eight boys and three girls).

In 1857 six-year-old Gruelle settled with his family in Arcola, Douglas County, Illinois. Gruelle wanted to be an artist from an early age, a talent that his mother encouraged, but his family could not afford to send him to art school. In 1884, around the age twelve or thirteen, Gruelle left school and apprenticed himself to a local house and sign painter, where he learned to mix paints. During this three-year apprenticeship, he also began teaching himself to paint using art-instruction books. In addition, local craftsmen taught him how to stretch canvases and make easels and stretchers. Gruelle later worked as a surveyor of railroads before moving to Decatur, Illinois, to establish an art studio.

== Marriage and family ==
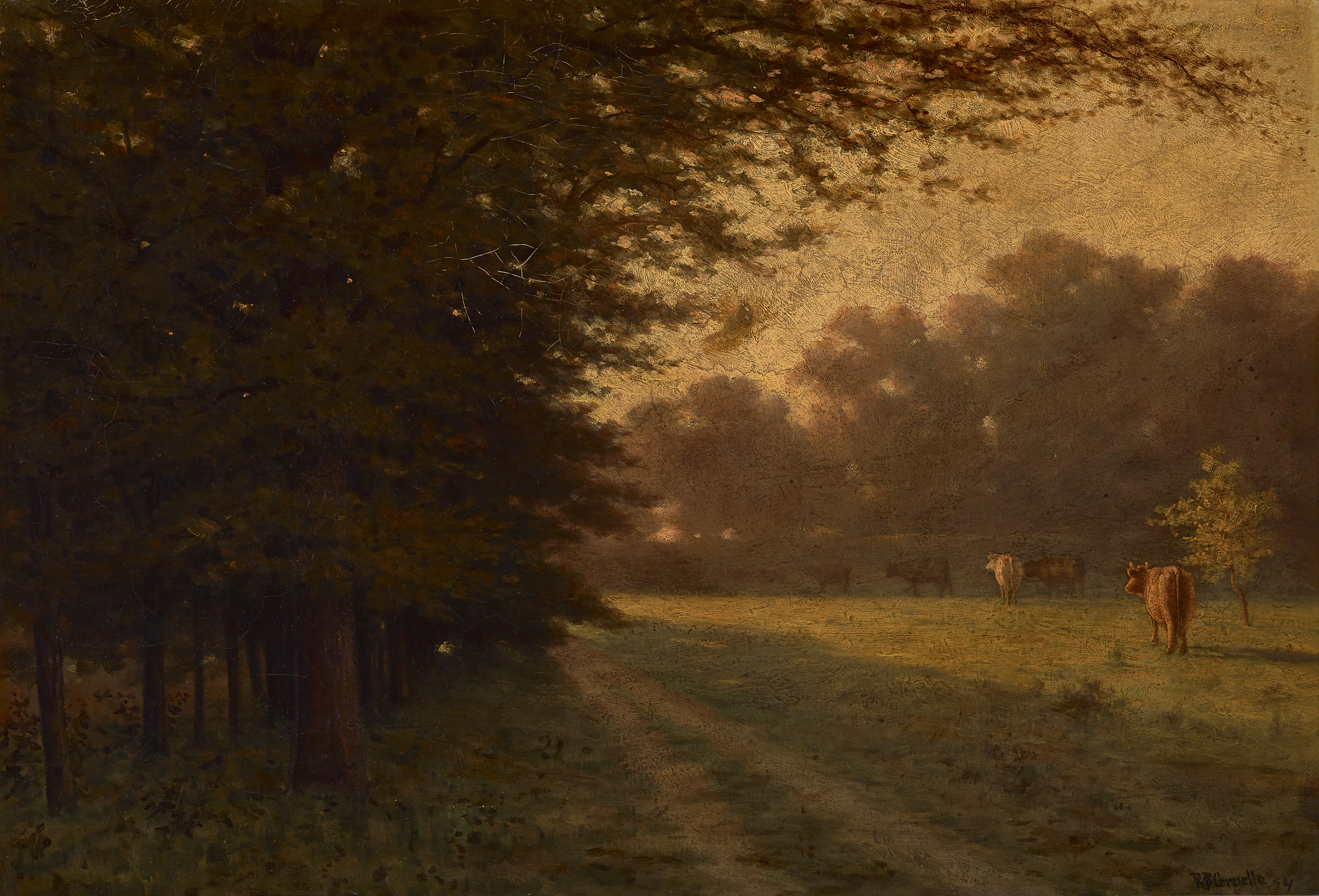
Indiana Landscape (1894) by Richard Buckner Gruelle, Mr. and Mrs. Julius F. Pratt Fund, Indianapolis Museum of Art

Gruelle married Alice Benton while he was living in Decatur, Illinois. They had three children: John, Prudence, and Justin. Although Gruelle was frequently away from home to paint and took extended trips to the East Coast of the United States, he was dedicated to his family. After the Gruelles moved to Indianapolis, Indiana, in 1882, the family settled in a home on Tacoma Avenue, where they lived for more than twenty-five years. Gruelle and his wife, Alice, became interested in spiritualism following a trip to Gloucester, Massachusetts, and, after his return to Indianapolis, the couple held Sunday séances in the parlor of their home.

In 1905, seeking greater opportunities for his family, Gruelle closed his Indianapolis studio, rented out the Tacoma Avenue home, and moved his wife and two youngest children to New York City. (His eldest son, John, was married and living in Cleveland, Ohio, at the time.) The Gruelles leased a flat on fourth-floor of an old building on Twenty-third Street, west of Sixth Avenue, in New York City. Their daughter, Prudence, continued her vocal training in New York, but Gruelle, his wife, and younger son, Justin, returned to Indianapolis in 1907. Gruelle continued to paint in Indianapolis until the family relocated to Connecticut in 1910.

Both of Gruelle's sons became artists. John Barton (1880–1938), the eldest, was an illustrator and author who is best known as the creator of the Raggedy Ann doll and related books and illustrations. Raggedy Ann Stories (1918) was the first of his twenty-eight books about Raggedy Ann and her friends.

Gruelle's youngest child, Justin Carlisle (1889–1979), studied art with William Forsyth at the John Herron Art Institute (forerunner to the Herron School of Art and Design) in Indianapolis and at the Art Students League of New York in New York City. He became a landscape painter like his father. Justin Gruelle is best known for fourteen murals he painted for the Works Progress Administration, and pavilion murals he painted for the 1939 New York World's Fair.

The middle Gruelle child, a daughter named Prudence (1884–1966), trained as a vocal musician in New York City at the Grand Conservatory of Music and the Metropolitan Opera School. She later performed in vaudeville theaters under the stage name of Prudence Gru, and married Albert Matzke, an illustrator and watercolorist. Prudence Gruelle Matzke also became an author of children's books. In addition, she became a syndicated newspaper columnist of "Good Night Stories" for children, writing under the pseudonym of Blanche Silver. There is little known about The Fourth Child Ernest.

== Career ==
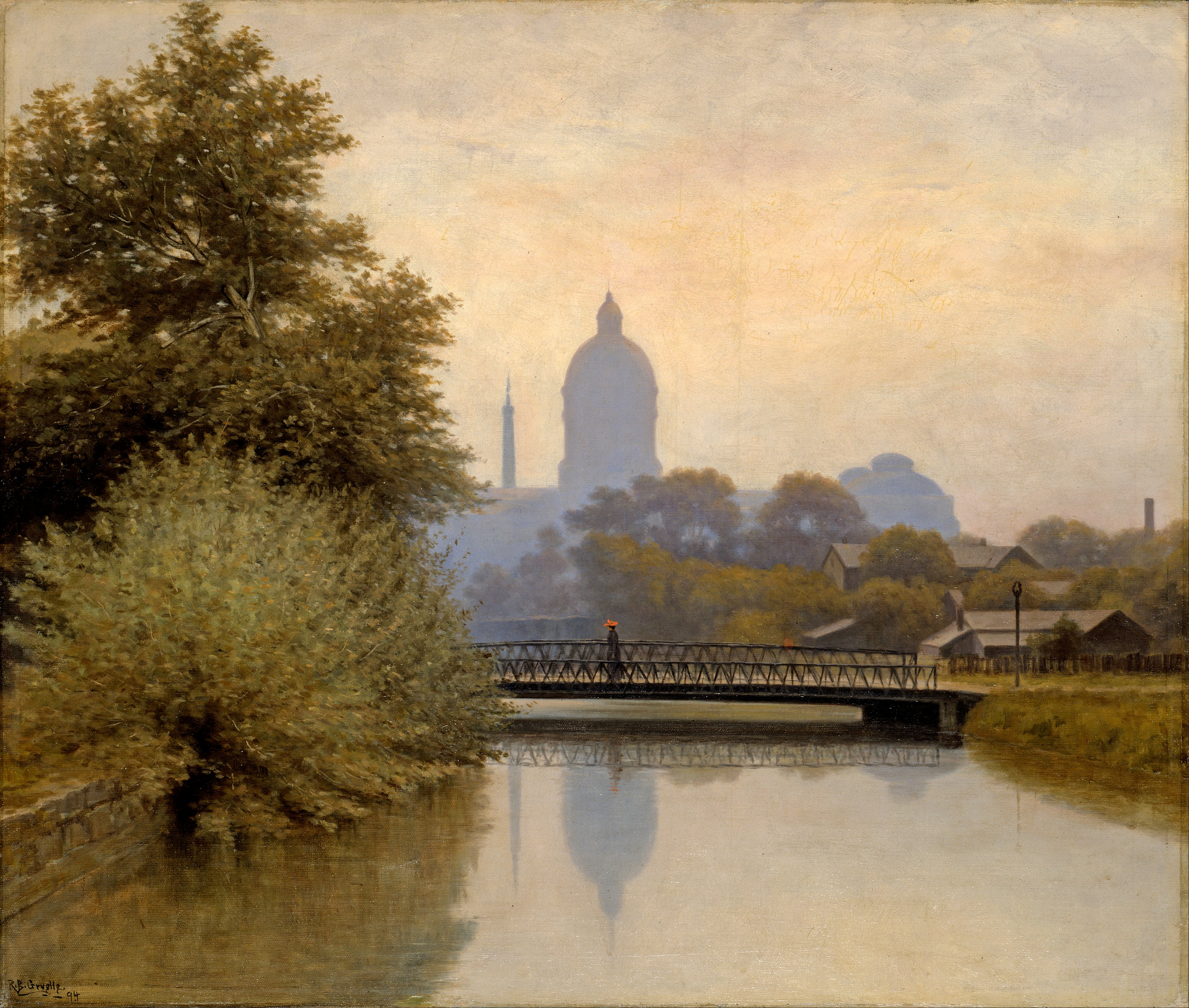
The Canal Morning Effect (1894)

Richard Gruelle began his professional career as an artist in Decatur, Illinois, where he established his first studio, but the self-taught painter also briefly lived and worked in Ohio, and Florida, before establishing himself in Indiana in 1882. Gruelle became a full-time artist, achieving fame as a member of the Hoosier Group of painters. In addition to painting Indiana landscapes, Gruelle made extended trips to the East Coast, where he concentrated on painting marine landscapes. He also lived and maintained a studio in New York City from 1905 to 1907, before returning to his home in Indianapolis. In 1910 the Gruelles relocated to Norwalk, Connecticut.

=== Early years ===
Gruelle opened his first studio in Decatur, Illinois, specializing in portraiture, but he also painted landscapes and taught painting. Gruelle and his wife, Alice, later moved to Cincinnati, Ohio, where he briefly decorated cast-iron safes for a local firm and took art classes at night. The couple returned to Arcola, Illinois, in 1876 to care for his widowed mother and an aunt. In 1881, after spending about five years in Arcola, Gruelle, his wife, and infant son, John, left Illinois to live in Gainesville, Florida, before they relocated to Indiana a year later.

=== Artist ===
In 1882 thirty-one-year-old Gruelle moved his family to Indianapolis, Indiana, and established himself as a full-time artist. The family settled into a modest home on Tacoma Avenue, which remained the artist's primary residence for the next twenty-eight years. Gruelle enjoyed music, in addition to art, and learned to play the piano. He also attended musical concerts. Gruelle was considered an "artistic jack-of-all-trades," but he focused on painting landscapes in oils and watercolor. From his home base in Indianapolis, Gruelle often traveled to the East Coast, making extended sketching trips to Washington, D.C.; Baltimore, Maryland; and Gloucester, Massachusetts.

Indiana poet James Whitcomb Riley commissioned Gruelle to illustrate two of his poems, "When the Frost is on the Punkin'" and "The Old Swimmin' Hole," which were published in Neighborly Poems (1891). That same year, Herbert Hess, an Indianapolis art patron, invited Gruelle to come to Washington, D.C., to paint the U.S. Capitol. Gruelle spent several subsequent seasons in the 1890s painting and exhibiting his work in the Washington, D.C., area.

In December 1894, five Indianapolis-area artists (Gruelle, William Forsyth, Otto Stark, J. Ottis Adams, and T. C. Steele), were included the Five Hoosier Painters exhibition that the Central Art Association sponsored in Chicago, Illinois. Local art critics praised the exhibition, which was held in sculptor Lorado Taft's Chicago studio, for its "individuality, vitality and fresh approach." The exhibition's reviewers also declared that the paintings were "a truly American expression within the modern idiom." One art critic noted that Gruelle's paintings in the exhibition, which included Passing Storm, showed his "keen and analytical" perceptions, dominated with "a feeling for symmetrical grouping." As a result of the publicity from the show, the five artists were dubbed the Hoosier Group. Although the men were professional friends, and their work was exhibited in many of the same art shows, they never formally organized as a group. Each artist maintained his independence and own artistic style.

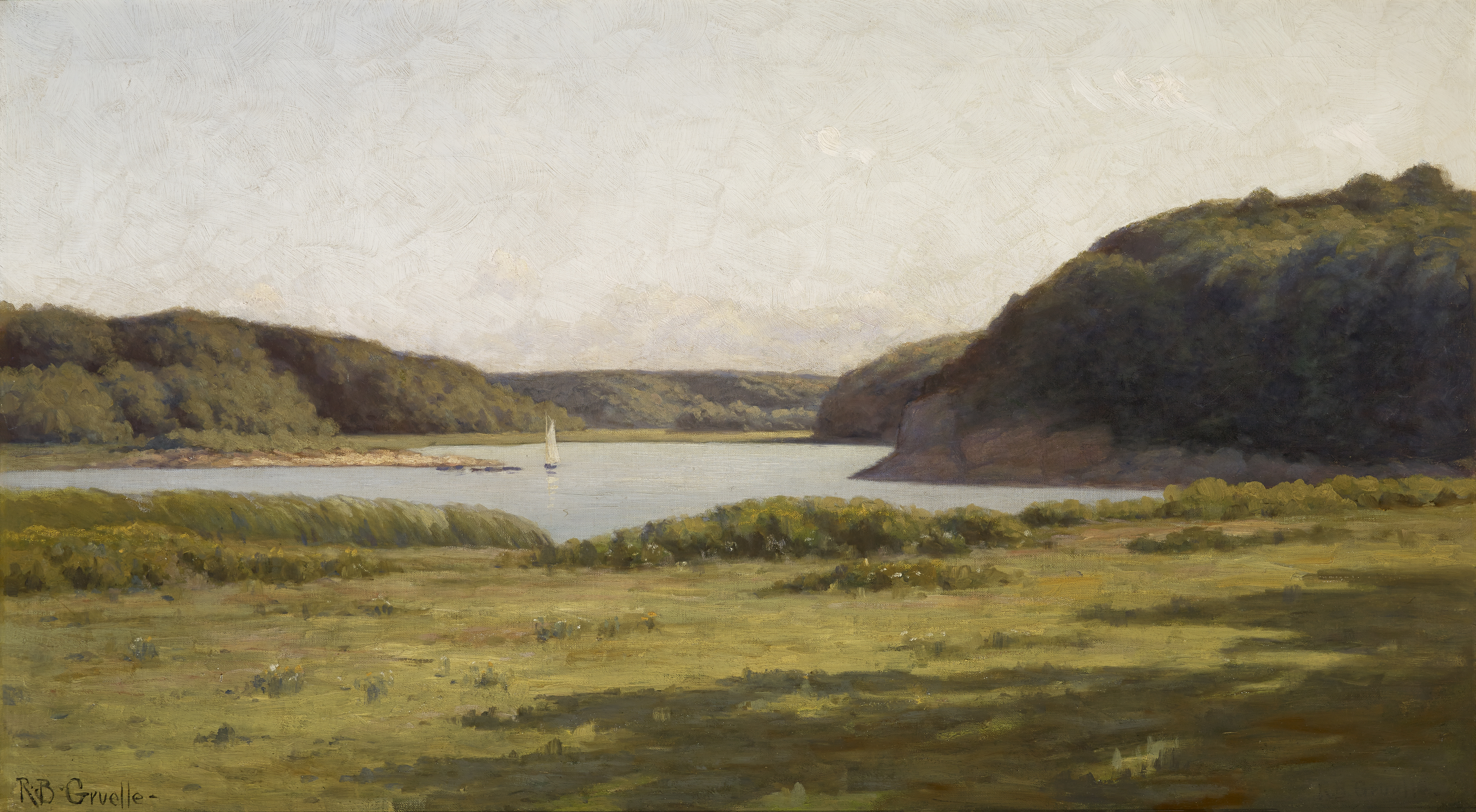
Inlet, Gloucester Harbor (1892) by Richard Buckner Gruelle, Julius F. Pratt Fund, Indianapolis Museum of Art

In 1897, Boston, Massachusetts, lithographer Louis Prang commissioned Gruelle to paint marine landscapes in Gloucester, Massachusetts. The trip provided the artist's first opportunity to see the Atlantic Ocean. Gruelle later made annual trips to paint at Cape Ann, Massachusetts, spending six weeks to two months each summer sketching and painting in the area. In addition to regular trips to the East Coast, Gruelle lived in New York City from 1905 to 1907 with his wife, Alice, and two younger children, but returned to Indianapolis, where he continued to paint until the family relocated to Connecticut in 1910.

=== Author ===
In 1892 Gruelle was invited to view the private art collection of Baltimore industrialist William Thompson Walters at his Maryland home. After the visit Gruelle wrote an article describing the collection for the first issue of Modern Art magazine. After reading Gruelle's article, which included vivid descriptions of the artworks, Walters asked him to write a book about the collection. Gruelle agreed to the project in 1893, and spent about a year cataloging the collection before completing the manuscript in 1894. Notes, Critical and Biographical: Collection of W. T. Walters was published in 1895. Gruelle's only book provided detailed descriptions of the masterworks of Jean-François Millet, Théodore Rousseau, Jean-Baptiste-Camille Corot, Eugène Delacroix, and Théodore Géricault, among others in the Walters collection, as well as his own artistic insights. Gruelle also wrote subsequent articles for Modern Art magazine and the Indianapolis News.

== Later years ==
In 1910, at the age of fifty-nine, Gruelle and his wife, Alice, moved to a century-old home on property they purchased in Norwalk, Connecticut, about 43 miles (69 km) from New York City. Gruelle and his wife shared the 16-acre (6.5-hectare) property with their three grown children: John and his wife, Myrtle; Prudence and her husband, Albert Matzke; and the youngest Gruelle son, Justin.

Gruelle continued to paint in Connecticut, focusing on what he saw in nature, especially seascapes. Although the Connecticut property was Gruelle's home for the remainder of his life, he frequently returned to Indianapolis to exhibit his work and visit friends and family members.

In July 1912 Gruelle suffered a paralyzing stroke, which affected the right side of his body, and left him unable to paint. He hoped to recover and resume painting, but his health continued to deteriorate.

== Death and legacy ==
Gruelle died in Indianapolis, Indiana, on November 8, 1914, while visiting family members. His remains are interred at Crown Hill Cemetery in Indianapolis (Section 35, Lot 213).

Gruelle is best known for his landscape paintings, as well as his book, Notes: Critical and Biographical: Collection of W. T. Walters (1895). Gruelle's art from the time he spent at Gloucester, Massachusetts, are among his best, especially his watercolors. Among his most notable paintings were a series of marine scenes that included The Drama of the Elements. Gruelle's masterwork, The Canal––Morning Effect (1894), is a painting of the Indianapolis skyline from the south side of the city's Military Park. The Art Association of Indianapolis quickly acquired the painting, and it remains in the collection of the Indianapolis Museum of Art. Gruelle only occasionally exhibited his works in national exhibitions, with two notable exceptions. He exhibited at the Society of Western Artists annual shows and in 1904 at the Louisiana Purchase Exposition at Saint Louis, Missouri. Gruelle preferred one-man shows held in Indianapolis, Indiana, and in New Canaan, Connecticut.

Gruelle was a member of several arts organizations, including the Art Association of Indianapolis (forerunner to the present-day Indianapolis Museum of Art), the New Canaan Society of Artists, the Society of Western Artists, and the Knockers, an East Coast art group that later became the Silvermine Guild of Artists and Art School.

== Honors and tributes ==
Several of Gruelle's paintings were included in the Indiana State Museum's exhibition, "The Best Years: Indiana Paintings of the Hoosier Group, 1880–1915, Theodore C. Steele, John Ottis Adams, William Forsyth, Otto Stark, Richard Gruelle," from October 11, 1985, through March 16, 1986.

== Selected works ==
Stark's artwork is included in private collections, as well as several art museums. These include Indianapolis Museum of Art and the Indiana State Museum, among others.

- The Artist's Studio (1892)
- The Canal––Morning Effect (1894), Indianapolis Museum of Art
- Indiana Landscape (1894), Indianapolis Museum of Art
- View of Washington D.C. (1895), Indiana State Museum
- Lakeview (1896), Indiana State Museum
- Two Figures on Rocky Coast (1897), Indianapolis Museum of Art
- Seascape (ca. 1897), Indianapolis Museum of Art
