= Raggedy Man (disambiguation) =

Raggedy Man may refer to:

- Raggedy Man, a 1981 American drama film starring Eric Roberts and Sissy Spacek
- Raggedy Man, a name for The Doctor starting in The Eleventh Hour (Doctor Who)
- The Raggedy Man, an 1890 children's book by James Whitcomb Riley
- The Raggedy Man, a nickname given to the zombie leader in Cell by Stephen King.
