= The Adventures of Raggedy Ann and Andy =

- Title card
- Genre: Children; Adventure; Fantasy
- Based on: Raggedy Ann by Johnny Gruelle
- Developed by: Janis Diamond
- Directed by: Jeff Hall
- Voices of: Christina Lange; Josh Rodine
- Composers: Bobby Bennett; David Storrs
- Country of origin: United States
- Original language: English
- No. of seasons: 1
- No. of episodes: 13

Production
- Executive producers: Peter Aries, Jr.
- Producer: Davis Doi
- Running time: 23 minutes
- Production companies: CBS Productions (Note: Animation outsourced to Wang Film Productions.); Overseas animation: Sullivan Bluth Studios; Macmillan Inc.

Original release
- Network: CBS
- Release: September 17 – December 24, 1988

The Adventures of Raggedy Ann and Andy is an American animated television series that aired on CBS from September 17 to December 24, 1988. Based on the dolls Raggedy Ann and Andy by Johnny Gruelle, the series was produced directly by CBS in honor of the 70th anniversary of the characters. The series was cancelled in 1989, although CBS aired reruns during the 1989–90 television season, and in August 1991 when Pee-Wee's Playhouse was shelved.

== Overview ==
The plot involved a little girl named Marcella whose Raggedy Ann and Andy dolls would come to life when no humans were present in her bedroom. Then they would be whisked off to a parallel world to save its inhabitants from the villain, an evil but inept sorcerer known as Cracklin.

Also aiding Ann and Andy, besides the Camel with the Wrinkled Knees, were two of Marcella's other stuffed animals, a panda with a faux-British accent known as Grouchy Bear and a stuffed rabbit known as Sunny Bunny, as well as the Raggedy Cat and the Raggedy Dog. Sometimes they would be joined by more modern toys such as robots or toy soldiers. Often the plot involved the toys helping children in such places as Ancient Egypt or a Native American tribe. As the cartoon was meant for younger audiences it was unlike most other cartoons of the 1980s which had "morals to the story" at the end, although one episode lightly touched upon the issue of poaching when Raggedy Ann, Andy and their friends had to save endangered unicorns from cattle rustlers, who sought to steal their horns for personal gain.

== Voice cast ==
=== Main voices ===
- Christina Lange as Raggedy Ann
- Josh Rodine as Raggedy Andy
- Charlie Adler as Grouchy Bear, Tick & Tack
- Kenneth Mars as The Camel with the Wrinkled Knees
- Katie Leigh as Sunny Bunny
- Dana Hill as Raggedy Dog
- Kath Soucie as Raggedy Cat
- Gaille Heidemann as Mother
- Tracy Rowe as Marcella

=== Additional voices ===
- Michael Bell as Cracklin
- Bob Bergen
- Sheryl Bernstein as Helena
- P.L. Brown
- Ruth Buzzi
- William Callaway
- Hamilton Camp
- Nancy Cartwright as Little Chicken
- Chris Cavanaugh as Cody
- Cam Clarke
- Danny Cooksey as Cousin David
- Brian Cummings
- Jim Cummings as Trollit
- Jennifer Darling as Clea, Nephra
- Ellen Gerstell as Princess Astra
- Tony Jay as Ludlam
- Sherry Lynn as Lorelei
- Dave Mallow
- Danny Mann
- Allan Melvin
- Patty Parris
- Rob Paulsen as Tally Ho
- David Prince
- Hal Rayle
- Peter Reneday
- Neil Ross
- Maggie Roswell
- Frank Welker as Megamite

== Episodes ==
Thirteen episodes were created:

| No. | Title | Directed by | Written by | Original release date | Prod. code |
|---|---|---|---|---|---|
| 1 | "The Perriwonk Adventure" | Jeff Hall | Janis Diamond | September 17, 1988 | 101 |
The toys track Marcella's missing locket to a village inhabited by hybrid alligator-anteater creatures called Perriwonks, who plan to sacrifice it to a dragon.
| 2 | "The Pirate Adventure" | Jeff Hall | Janis Diamond | September 24, 1988 | 102 |
A treasure map leading to a pot of gold leads the toys to a crew of pirates who kidnap Andy.
| 3 | "The Mabbit Adventure" | Jeff Hall | George Atkins | October 1, 1988 | 103 |
Cracklin steals a book of spells from the Mabbits.
| 4 | "The Beastly Ghost Adventure" | Jeff Hall | S : Linda Woolverton; T : Janis Diamond and George Atkins | October 8, 1988 | 104 |
A ghost story told by Marcella becomes horrifyingly true when the ghost of the tale begins terrorizing the toys.
| 5 | "The Pixling Adventure" | Jeff Hall | Karen Willson and Chris Weber | October 15, 1988 | 105 |
Ann and Andy must return Luke, the infant prince of the Pixlings, to his home before his evil cousin Count Gerich takes over.
| 6 | "The Sunny Bunny Ransom Adventure" | Jeff Hall | Sheryl Scarborough and Kayte Kuch | October 22, 1988 | 106 |
Cracklin kidnaps Sunny Bunny.
| 7 | "The Megamite Adventure" | Jeff Hall | George Atkins | October 29, 1988 | 107 |
Marcella's cousin David has a robot named Megamite, who gets whisked off into the parallel world with Raggedy Ann. When Cracklin sees Megamite has the power to transform water into silver, he steals the robot and dries up the reservoir of a village of pixies, risking widespread dehydration unless Raggedy Ann can recapture Megamite.
| 8 | "The Boogeyman Adventure" | Jeff Hall | T : George Atkins; S/T : Janis Diamond | November 12, 1988 | 108 |
Ann and Andy are sent to a wizarding world where there are reputed boogeymen. They encounter one, but he is akin to a child, saying that while he is of the same species of those monsters, he has been apprenticed under a good witch to help create good boogeymen. Cracklin kidnaps the "boogeykid" in an effort to get his own monster.
| 9 | "The Christmas Adventure" | Jeff Hall | Karen Willson and Chris Weber | November 19, 1988 | 109 |
Cracklin attempts to steal Santa's sleigh and ruin Christmas.
| 10 | "The Sacred Cat Adventure" | Jeff Hall | S : George Atkins; T : Sheryl Scarborough and Kayte Kuch | November 25, 1988 | 110 |
Ann and Andy are sent to Egypt, where they must find a cat who belongs to Clea, a little girl who was the daughter of a recent deceased pharaoh. The cat leads them to a magic lamp which contains a genie which can get them back to Marcella's room, but it is also sought out by the princess' wicked half-sister, Nephra, who seeks the lamp to usurp the princess' ascent to the throne.
| 11 | "The Little Chicken Adventure" | Jeff Hall | S : Gordon Bressack; T : George Atkins | December 10, 1988 | 111 |
Ann and Andy are sent to a desert in the Old West, where unicorns exist (although they are few in number). They encounter an Indian child named "Little Chicken", who is the tribe's laughingstock due to his name. An old legend says he can get a new name if he rides a white unicorn known as "Great White", but this is no simple task considering Great White can teleport at will.
| 12 | "The Warrior Star Adventure" | Jeff Hall | Buzz Dixon | December 17, 1988 | 112 |
Ann and Andy help Princess Astra to retrieve the Horn of Power from the evil wizard Ludlum.
| 13 | "The Magic Wings Adventure" | Jeff Hall | Janis Diamond and George Atkins | December 24, 1988 | 113 |
Ann and Andy find an egg which takes them to the land of the Grunges.
