= Raggedy Ann and Raggedy Andy (1941 film) =

- Directed by: Dave Fleischer
- Story by: William Turner; Worth Gruelle
- Produced by: Max Fleischer
- Starring: Jack Mercer; Pinto Colvig; Joy Terry; Bernie Fleischer; Johnny Rogers (all uncredited)
- Music by: Sammy Timberg; Dave Fleischer; Lou Fleischer
- Animation by: Myron Waldman; Joseph Oriolo; William Henning; Arnold Gillespie
- Color process: Technicolor
- Production company: Fleischer Studios
- Distributed by: Paramount Pictures
- Release date: April 11, 1941
- Running time: 17 minutes (two-reel)
- Language: English

Raggedy Ann and Raggedy Andy is a two-reel cartoon produced by Fleischer Studios and released on April 11, 1941. It was co-written by Johnny Gruelle's son, Worth. It was the first Paramount cartoon to feature Raggedy Ann. The cartoon depicts Raggedy Ann and Andy as sweethearts as opposed to siblings in the books.

== Summary ==
A little girl in a toy shop sees two rag dolls whose hands are sewn together. Because she cannot afford to purchase both dolls, and because she really prefers the "beautiful girl doll", she asks the toyshop owner if he would be willing to unstitch the hands so that she could buy "the beautiful girl doll". Turning down the little girl's request, the owner explains to her the reason behind his refusal.

One evening in Ragland, sentient needles, threads, scissors, paintbrushes, and other creative implements came together and created a Girl Rag Doll and a Boy Rag Doll. When Paintbrush had completed the dolls' faces, he gave each of them a magic candy heart, bringing them to life, and then informed them that they needed to visit the Castle of Names before sunset.

After leaving the workshop, the rag dolls met The Camel with the Wrinkled Knees who offered to take them to the castle, but on their way to the Castle, the Camel falls limp, due to his wrinkled knees. So, the rag dolls take him to the sawdust station, where they refilled him with sawdust, with the monkey's help.

Then the Boy Rag Doll fell under the spell of a beautiful Spanish doll, causing poor Girl Rag Doll's candy heart to break. The beautiful Spanish doll takes the Boy Rag Doll to "Glover's Land", where she danced to him. When the Girl Rag Doll was taken to the castle's hospital, she told the doctors to help her before passing out.

Meanwhile, the beautiful Spanish doll asked the rag boy's name, but when he told her he did not have one, she rejected him saying, "You are just a nobody without a name". He then leaves and finds the sawdust station. At the castle's hospital, they learned that the Girl Rag Doll's candy heart is broken, and there was nothing they could do to save her. Just then, the Camel heard the monkey's chirp. He rushed back to the sawdust station, where the Boy Rag Doll asks the monkey how to get to the castle, causing the monkey to point random directions.

As the king and the doctors sadly leave, the Camel and the Boy Rag Doll arrived at the castle's hospital. When the Boy Rag Doll finally found the Girl Rag Doll in her hospital room in a broken-hearted sleep, he revealed a Naming Certificate showing that they were named "Raggedy Ann" and "Andy". After telling her how much he loved her in song, she woke up and hugged him.

Raggedy Ann and Raggedy Andy skipped down the Castle's wedding aisle where they had their hands sewn together so they would never again be separated.

The story ends with the little girl sadly understanding why the dolls could not be sold separately; she turned to leave for home, but the toyshop owner stopped her and said, "Just because I cannot sell you one doll, does not mean I can not give you both of them". He handed both dolls to the grateful little girl; she thanked the man and walked home while Raggedy Ann and Andy followed her, lovingly embracing one another.

== Voices ==
- Jack Mercer as Paint Brush and one of the doctors
- Joy Terry as Raggedy Ann, the Little Girl, and the Beautiful Spanish Doll
- Bernie Fleischer as Raggedy Andy
- Pinto Colvig as Camel and the Toyshop Owner
- Johnny Rogers as Singer
