= Raggedy Ann =

Rag doll character by Johnny Gruelle

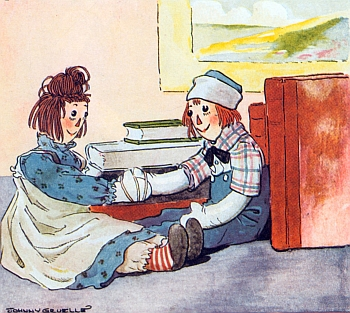
- Raggedy Ann meets Raggedy Andy for the first time; illustrated by Johnny Gruelle
- First appearance: Raggedy Ann Stories (1918)
- Created by: Johnny Gruelle
- Voiced by: Joyce Terry, Didi Conn, June Foray, Christina Lange

In-universe information
- Species: Doll
- Gender: Female
- Nationality: American

Raggedy Ann is a character created by American writer Johnny Gruelle (1880–1938) who appeared in a series of books he wrote and illustrated for young children. Raggedy Ann is a rag doll with red yarn for hair and a triangle nose. The character was created in 1915, as a doll, and was introduced to the public in the 1918 book Raggedy Ann Stories. When a doll was marketed with the book, the concept had great success. A sequel, Raggedy Andy Stories (1920), introduced the character of her brother, Raggedy Andy. Further characters such as the Camel with the Wrinkled Knees and Beloved Belindy, a black mammy doll, were featured as dolls and characters in books.

== Origins ==
The exact details of the origins of the Raggedy Ann doll and related stories, which were created by Johnny Gruelle, are not specifically known, although numerous myths and legends about the doll's origins have been widely repeated. Gruelle biographer and Raggedy Ann historian Patricia Hall notes that the dolls have "found themselves at the center of several legend cycles—groups of stories that, while containing kernels of truth, are more myth than they are history.

"What makes this even more intriguing is the fact that Johnny Gruelle, either unwittingly or with the great sense of humor he was known for, initiated many of these legends, a number of which are continuously repeated as the factual history of Raggedy Ann and Andy."

Hall further explains that according to an oft-repeated myth, Gruelle's daughter Marcella brought down from her grandmother's attic a faceless cloth doll on which the artist drew a face, and that Gruelle suggested that Marcella's grandmother sew a shoe button for a missing eye.

Hall says the date of this supposed occurrence is given as early as 1900 and as late as 1914, with the locale variously given as suburban Indianapolis, Indiana, downtown Cleveland, Ohio, or rural Connecticut. More likely, as Gruelle's wife Myrtle reported, it was her husband who retrieved a long-forgotten, homemade rag doll from the attic of his parents' Indianapolis home sometime around the turn of the twentieth century before the couple's daughter was born. Although the incident is unconfirmed, Myrtle Gruelle recalled, "There was something he wanted from the attic. While he was rummaging around for it, he found an old rag doll his mother had made for his sister. He said then that the doll would make a good story."

Myrtle Gruelle also indicated that her husband "kept [the doll] in his mind until we had Marcella. He remembered it when he saw her play [with] dolls ... He wrote the stories around some of the things she did. He used to get ideas from watching her."

Additionally, Gruelle did not create Raggedy Ann as a tribute to his daughter following her death at 13 from a vaccine that was Infected. Hall notes Gruelle's May 28, 1915, U.S. patent D47789 application for the design of the prototype that became the Raggedy Ann doll was already in progress around the time that Marcella fell ill, and the artist received final approval by the U.S. Patent office on September 7, 1915.

The following is a letter from Gruelle himself in regards to his daughters passing, “Feb. 28, 1921. Dear Mrs. Williams, Having recently lost our only daughter through Vaccination (in public school, without our consent) you may realize how terribly humorous the subject of vaccination appears to Mrs. Gruelle and myself. Of the seven physicians called in on the case, six pronounced it in emphatic terms malpractice. The seventh did not commit himself, being the head of the school board and a firm advocate of vaccination. Sincerely, Johnny Gruelle.”

== Naming Raggedy Ann ==
On June 17, 1915, shortly after submitting his patent application for the doll's design, Johnny Gruelle applied for a registered trademark for the Raggedy Ann name, which he created by combining words from two of James Whitcomb Riley poems, "The Raggedy Man" and "Little Orphant Annie". (Riley was a well-known Hoosier poet and a Gruelle family friend and neighbor from the years when they resided in Indianapolis.) The U.S. Patent Office registered Gruelle's trademark application (107328) for the Raggedy Ann name on November 23, 1915.

== Early books and doll design ==
Raggedy Ann Stories (1918), written and illustrated by Johnny Gruelle and published by the P. F. Volland Company, was the first in a series of books about his cloth doll character and her friends. The book's first edition also included Gruelle's own version of the doll's origins and the related stories. Two years after the publication of the first Raggedy Ann book, Gruelle introduced Raggedy Ann's brother, Raggedy Andy, in Raggedy Andy Stories (1920).

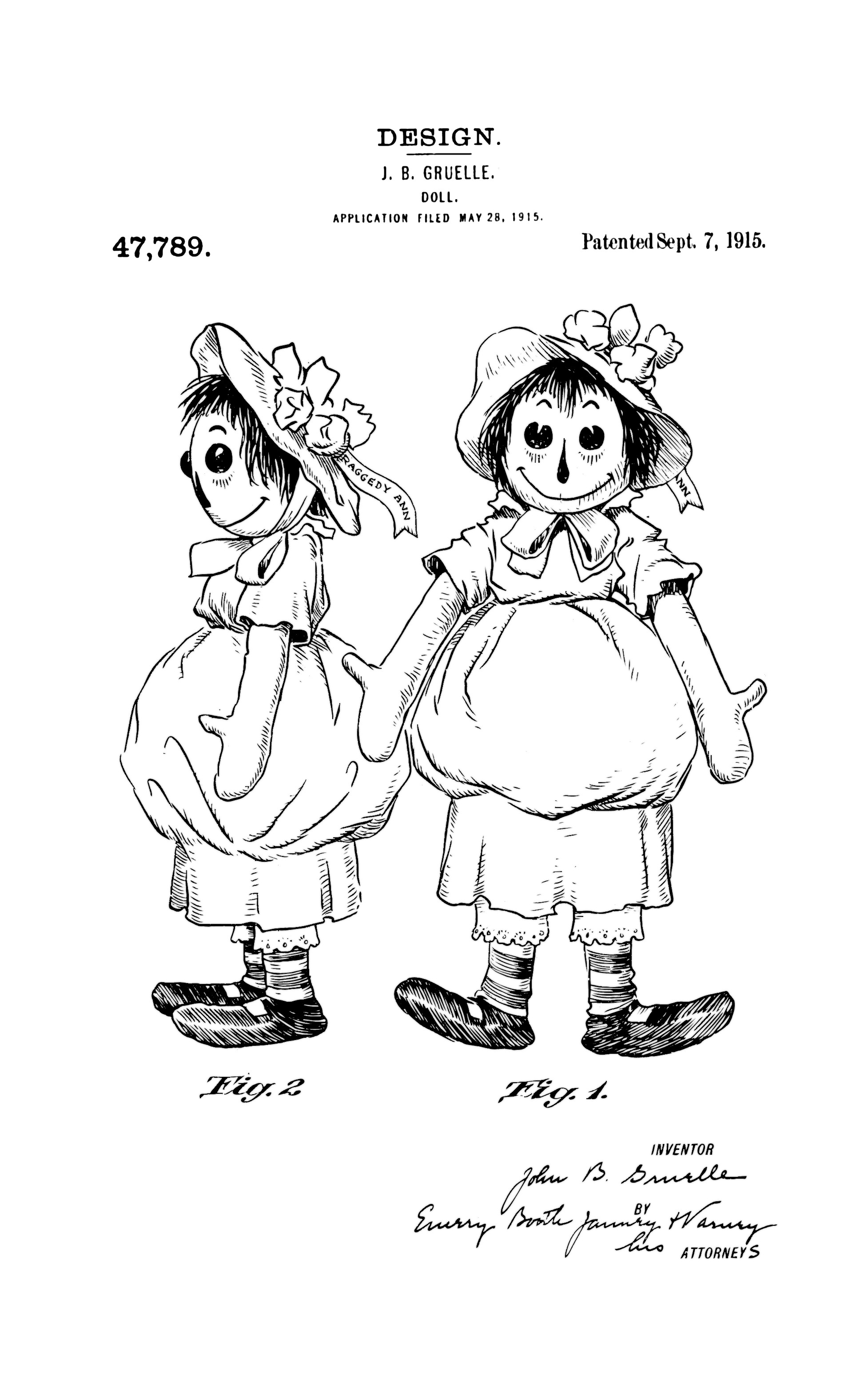
Gruelle's U.S. Patent design for what became known as the Raggedy Ann doll

Although the female members of Gruelle's family may have made a small number of initial versions of the Raggedy Ann doll in Norwalk, Connecticut, to help market the related books, Gruelle soon established a merchandising agreement with P. F. Volland Company, his primary publisher, to begin commercially manufacturing, selling, and promoting a mass-produced version of the doll.

In addition to his patent application U.S. patent D47789 in 1915 for the design of what became the Raggedy Ann doll, Gruelle patented his design U.S. patent D56149 for a generic male doll in 1920. A short time after its literary debut in 1920, Raggedy Andy appeared as a commercially made doll, marketed by Volland.

Following the success of the first Raggedy Ann book, Gruelle continued to author and illustrate at least one Raggedy Ann and Raggedy Andy story each year until his death in 1938. In addition to books Gruelle also wrote lyrics for musical compositions that were published as sheet music and songbooks for children. These works included "Raggedy Ann's Sunny Songs" (1930) which was set to music by former U. S. Treasury Secretary William H. Woodin.

In his later years Gruelle collaborated with his son, Worth, on illustrations for some of his later books such as Raggedy Ann and the Golden Meadow (1935) and on a series of illustrated Raggedy Ann proverbs that were syndicated in newspapers. By 1938, the year that Johnny Gruelle died, his first Raggedy Ann book had sold more than 3 million copies.

Raggedy Ann doll sales were also growing. The P. F. Volland Company's initial order of 24 dozen dolls from the Non-Breakable Toy Company, the doll's early manufacturer, increased to about 3,200 dolls within the first eight months of production. With its growing popularity, Gruelle gave Volland the exclusive rights to manufacture and sell the dolls as long as it remained the exclusive publisher of his books.

== Legal challenges ==
In 1935 Gruelle brought suit against Mollye Goldman (Gruelle vs. Goldman) after her company, Molly-'Es Doll Outfitters, continued to manufacture unauthorized versions of the Raggedy Ann and Andy dolls. Goldman's attorney argued that Gruelle's design patent for Raggedy Ann had expired in 1929, and Gruelle did not apply for a design patent or a trademark for a doll specifically named Raggedy Andy. The U.S. Patent office registered Goldman's application for a trademark for her Raggedy Ann and Raggedy Andy dolls in 1935. Her patent application U.S. patent D96382 for her Raggedy Andy design was granted on May 7, 1935. Goldman's versions of Raggedy Ann and Raggedy Andy closely resembled the Gruelle-designed rag dolls, which he had authorized the Exposition Doll and Toy Manufacturing Company to manufacture. Gruelle brought suit against Goldman for trademark infringement in October 1936, but the case was dismissed. He won the lawsuit on appeal in 1937. In the appellate court's option handed down on December 23, 1937, Goldman's company, Molly-'Es Doll Outfitters, could not legally manufacture dolls named Raggedy Ann and Raggedy Andy. Goldman was ordered to provide restitution to Gruelle.

Following Gruelle's death in 1938, Myrtle (Swann) Gruelle, his widow, took further legal action to secure the rights to his works, trademarks, and patents, including those relating to Raggedy Ann and Andy. She also continued to promote Raggedy Ann and Andy, among Gruelle's other literary characters, through the Johnny Gruelle Company, which also published the author's books for several years. (P. F. Volland, his primary publisher, had discontinued its book publishing business during the Great Depression.)

== Legacy ==
By the end of the 1940s, sales of Raggedy Ann-related books exceeded 7 million copies. The Indianapolis-based Bobbs-Merrill Company became the authorized publisher and licensor for Raggedy Ann-related literary works in 1962, and the Knickerbocker Toy Company began manufacturing the Raggedy Ann and Andy dolls in the early 1960s. Bobbs-Merrill eventually became part of Macmillan Inc. and later Simon & Schuster, while Hasbro acquired Knickerbocker Toys. As such, Hasbro holds the trademark for the Raggedy Ann stuffed doll, while all other trademarks are claimed by Simon & Schuster, at present a subsidiary of Kohlberg Kravis Roberts. The original U.S. patent D47789 for the 1915 doll design, as well as the Raggedy Ann Stories (1918) and Raggedy Andy Stories (1920) books, are in the public domain.

The Raggedy Ann and Raggedy Andy dolls and their related memorabilia have become sought-after collector's items. In addition to the dolls and books, other related items continue to be produced including adaptations of the stories into comic books, audio recordings, animated films, and television and theatrical productions.

== Honors and tributes ==
The Raggedy Ann doll was inducted into the National Toy Hall of Fame in Rochester, New York, on March 27, 2002. Raggedy Andy was inducted 5 years later on November 8, 2007.

== Related books ==
Johnny Gruelle, Raggedy Ann's creator, authored and/or illustrated dozens of related works. Many other books were released and in some cases credited to Gruelle after his death in 1938. In addition, numerous works have been written or illustrated by others such as Ethel Hays, who illustrated most of the Saalfield Publishing Company's Raggedy Ann-related stories published from 1944.

=== Written and illustrated by Johnny Gruelle ===
- Raggedy Ann Stories (1918)
- Raggedy Andy Stories (1920)
- Raggedy Ann and Andy and the Camel with the Wrinkled Knees (1924)
- Raggedy Andy's Number Book (1924)
- Raggedy Ann's Wishing Pebble (1925)
- Raggedy Ann's Alphabet Book (1925)
- Beloved Belindy (1926)
- The Paper Dragon: A Raggedy Ann Adventure (1926)
- Raggedy Ann's Fairy Stories (1928)
- Raggedy Ann's Magical Wishes (1928)
- Marcella: A Raggedy Ann Story (1929)
- Raggedy Ann in the Deep Deep Woods (1930)
- Raggedy Ann's Sunny Songs (1930)
- Raggedy Ann in Cookie Land (1931)
- Raggedy Ann's Lucky Pennies (1932)
- Raggedy Ann Cut-Out Paper Doll (1935)
- Raggedy Ann's Little Brother Andy Cut-Out Paper Doll (1935)
- Raggedy Ann in the Golden Meadow (1935)
- Raggedy Ann and the Left-Handed Safety Pin (1935)
- Raggedy Ann's Joyful Songs (1937)
- Raggedy Ann and Maizie Moocow (1937)
- Raggedy Ann and Andy's Very Own Fairy Stories (1970)

=== Written by Johnny Gruelle; illustrated by others ===
- Raggedy Ann in the Magic Book (1939)
- Raggedy Ann and the Laughing Brook (1940)
- Raggedy Ann and the Golden Butterfly (1940)
- Raggedy Ann and the Hoppy Toad (1940)
- Raggedy Ann Helps Grandpa Hoppergrass (1940)
- Raggedy Ann in the Garden (1940)
- Raggedy Ann Goes Sailing (1941)
- The Camel with the Wrinkled Knees (1941)
- Raggedy Ann and Andy and the Nice Fat Policeman (1942)
- Raggedy Ann and Betsy Bonnet String (1943)
- Raggedy Ann in the Snow White Castle (1946)
- Raggedy Ann's Adventures (1947)
- Raggedy Ann and the Slippery Slide (1947)
- Raggedy Ann's Mystery (1947)
- Raggedy Ann at the End of the Rainbow (1947)
- Raggedy Ann and Marcella's First Day At School (1952)
- Raggedy Ann's Merriest Christmas (1952)
- Raggedy Andy's Surprise (1953)
- Raggedy Ann's Tea Party (1954)
- A Puzzle for Raggedy Ann and Andy (1957)
- Raggedy Ann's Secret (1959)
- Raggedy Ann's Christmas Surprise (ca. 1960)
- Raggedy Ann's Stories to Read Aloud (1960)
- Raggedy Ann and the Golden Ring (1961)
- Raggedy Ann and the Hobby Horse (1961)
- Raggedy Ann and the Happy Meadow (1961)
- Raggedy Ann and the Wonderful Witch (1961)
- Raggedy Ann and Andy and the Kindly Ragman (1975)
- Raggedy Ann and Andy and the Witchie Kissabye (1975)

=== Adaptations attributed to Gruelle, or based on his works ===
- Raggedy Ann and Andy—with Animated Illustrations (1944)
- Raggedy Ann and Andy Giant Treasury (1984)

=== Written by others; illustrated by Gruelle and/or others ===
- The Bam Bam Clock, by J. P. McEvoy, Illustrated by Johnny Gruelle, P. F. Volland Co., 1920 (Later issued by Algonquin Publishing, circa 1936) (Note: This children's fairy story mentions Raggedy Ann occasionally and contains five color depictions of her. These are very early depictions of Raggedy Ann outside of the Raggedy Ann series. She plays no active part in text, being merely mentioned as present, almost like part of the landscape, although the pictures depict her actions.)
- Raggedy Ann and the Tagalong Present (1971)
- Raggedy Andy's Treasure Hunt (1973)
- Raggedy Ann's Cooking School (1974)
- Raggedy Ann and Andy's Cookbook (1975)
- Raggedy Granny Stories (1977)
- Raggedy Ann and Andy's Sewing Book (1977)

=== Raggedy Ann and Andy's Grow and Learn Library ===
A collection of twenty books published by Lynx, with each story containing a lesson, such as maintaining friendship when someone moves away or why parents must go to work. Raggedy Ann and Andy live in Marcella's playroom with many other toys such as Babette the French doll, Raggedy Dog, The Camel with the Wrinkled Knees, Sunny Bunny, Bubbles the Clown, Tim the Toy Soldier and more.

- Sunny Bunny Comes Home: Marcella discovers Sunny Bunny in the attic and brings him to the nursery, where the other toys show off their talents. The rabbit doesn't have any talents that he can discern, but when he hops high to save Marcella's balloons, he earns respect from the other toys.
- Little Bear's Problem: While visiting the circus with Marcella, Raggedy Ann & Andy meet Little Bear, who's dismayed that he doesn't get to spend much time with his parents. The dolls teach him that his folks are bringing joy to others, so Little Bear decides to concentrate on his own future career as a performer.
- Sam Lamb Moves Away: Marcella gives Sam Lamb to her visiting cousin. The toys miss their friend so they send letters via the sparrows and discover Sam has found a happy new home.
- Raggedy Dog to the Rescue: Raggedy Dog is jealous when Raggedy Cat comes to live in the nursery, so he chases her to Raggedy Land and corners her in a tree. Realizing that he's done wrong, the dog comes to the cat's rescue and they become friends.
- What Can a Camel Do?: The Camel with the Wrinkled Knees can't think of a thing to do for the Talent Show, but he ultimately discovers that he has a talent for hauling the toys' equipment to the Talent Show.
- Babette's Scary Night: When the dolls camp out in the playhouse, Babette becomes spooked by the scary stories that her friends tell, but they ultimately convince her that she has nothing to fear.
- A Very Close Call: When the toys play a game of hide-and-seek, Bubbles the clown gets locked in the pantry, so everyone works to free him.
- Grouchy Bear's Parade: Marcella brings home a teddy bear whom she names Grouchy. The toy feels obliged to live up to his name, but Raggedy Ann teaches him that it's okay to show his true feelings. Once he does, Grouchy is chosen to lead the Teddy Bear Parade.
- The Box of Tricks: Raggedy Andy gets into a box of tricks that Marcella received for her birthday. The other toys aren't amused, so they turn the tables on him.
- Raggedy Dog's Bone: Raggedy Dog is proud when he discovers a bone buried in the yard, but he learns that it belongs to Fido, Marcella's real puppy.
- The Jack-In-The-Box: Marcella's cousin brings a Jack-in-the-Box who doesn't want to play with the other toys, so they put on a pretend circus and invite him to join.
- Play Ball: While visiting Marcella's cousin's house, Raggedy Ann and Andy are asked to participate in a baseball game, but Andy discovers he's not a great player.
- The Play in the Attic: The toys are placed in the attic while the playroom is being painted. They're initially upset by the move, but they dig through trunks and entertain themselves by staging a production of Goldilocks and the Three Bears.
- Raggedy Dog Learns to Share: Fido leaves his ball with Raggedy Dog, who doesn't want the other toys to play with it.
- Raggedy Andy's Perfect Party: Raggedy Andy suggests the toys throw a party to celebrate the first day of summer. Everyone is assigned duties, but he neglects to designate someone to decorate.
- The Sleepover: When Marcella chooses Sunny Bunny to accompany her on a sleepover, the rabbit worries that her friend's toys won't like him.
- The Birthday Surprise: The toys have assigned duties in preparation for the Camel's birthday party, but Babette gets distracted and is forced to improvise her bouquet.
- Bubbles Goes to the Fair: Bubbles the Clown practices juggling in hopes of winning a prize at the Raggedy Land Fair, but he forgets to bring along his juggling balls.
- Tim's Big Adventure: On a rainy day, Raggedy Ann decides to read a story to the other toys. Tim the toy soldier has no interest, but he's soon swept up in the drama and envisions himself as the hero.
- A Parent's Guide to Raggedy Ann and Andy's Grow and Learn Library: Includes summaries of the stories and themes, plus tie-in activities for children.

== Other adaptations ==
Many subsequent adaptations of the Raggedy Ann and Andy books have been published, in addition to the characters appearing in other media formats.

=== Animated feature films and shorts ===
- Fleischer Studios/Famous Studios shorts:
  - Raggedy Ann and Raggedy Andy (1941)
  - Suddenly It's Spring (1944)
  - The Enchanted Square (1947)
- Raggedy Ann & Andy: A Musical Adventure (1977)
- Snowden: Raggedy Ann & Andy's Adventure (1998)

=== Theatre and stage ===
- Raggedy Ann and Andy (1981)
- Raggedy Ann: The Musical Adventure (1986)

=== Television ===
- Raggedy Ann and Andy in The Great Santa Claus Caper (1978)
- Raggedy Ann and Andy in The Pumpkin Who Couldn't Smile (1979)
- The Adventures of Raggedy Ann and Andy (1988–1990)
- Raggedy Ann and Andy and the Camel with the Wrinkled Knees (1988)
- The Snowden, Raggedy Ann and Andy Holiday Show (1998)

=== Audio recordings ===
- Raggedy Ann's Sunny Songs (1931 and 1946)
- Raggedy Ann's Songs of Happiness (1934)
- Songs of Raggedy Ann and Andy (1948)
- Johnny Gruelle's Raggedy Ann Songs and Stories (ca. 1960s)
- Hallmark "Read-Along Story Records" (1974)
- Raggedy Ann & Andy: A Musical Adventure (1977)
- Raggedy Ann & Andy: Birthday Party (1980)
- Raggedy Ann & Andy: Pop Concert (1980)
- Raggedy Ann & Andy's Alphabet & Numbers (1980)
- Raggedy Ann & Andy's Dance Party (1980)
- Raggedy Ann & Andy's Merry Adventures (1980)
- Raggedy Ann & Andy: Bend and Stretch (1981)
- Raggedy Ann & Andy: Christmas Party (1981)
- Raggedy Ann & Andy: Happiness Album (1981)
- Raggedy Ann & Andy: Telling Time is Fun (1981)
- A Raggedy Ann Songbook (1996)

=== Comic books ===
- Dell Publishing featured Raggedy Ann-related stories in a series of comic books.
  - New Funnies (volume 1)
  - Animal Comics
  - Four Color Comics
  - Raggedy Ann + Raggedy Andy (1946–1949)
  - Raggedy Ann + Andy (1948)
  - Raggedy Ann and Andy (1955)
  - Raggedy Ann and Andy (1964–1966)

== Doll manufacturers ==
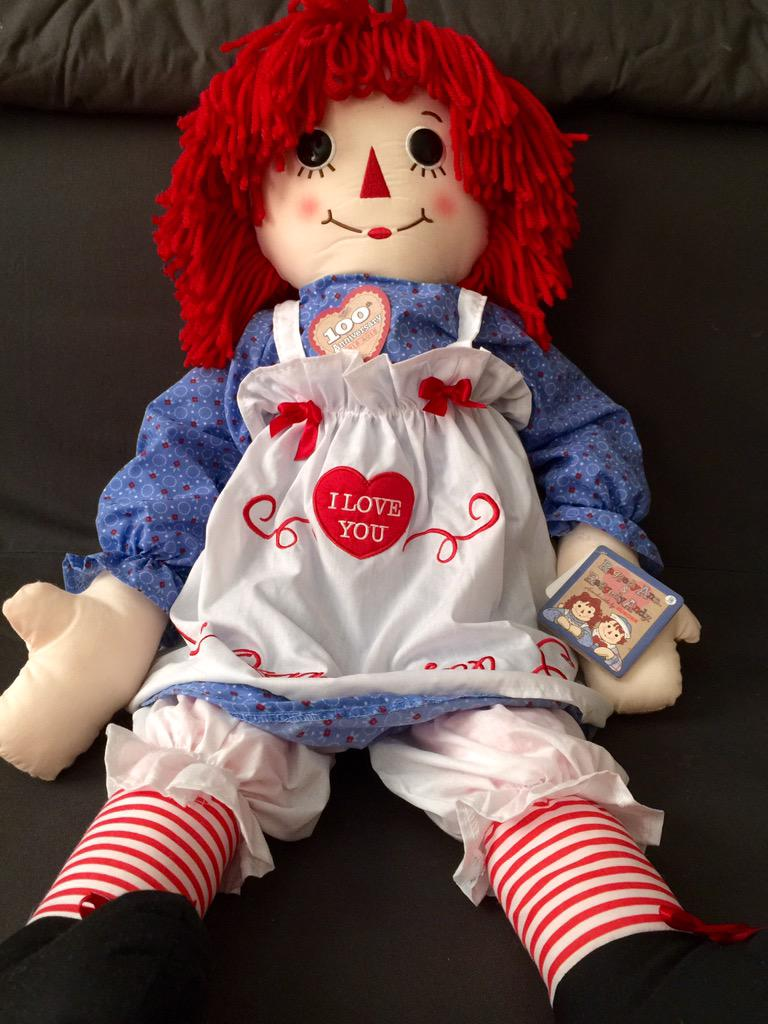
A Raggedy Ann 100-year edition doll

- P. F. Volland Company (1920-1934)
- Beers, Keelier, and Bowman (early manufacturer of Raggedy Andy dolls)
- Exposition Doll and Toy Company (1935-mid 1935)
- Molly-'Es Doll Outfitters (without permission) (1935-1937)
- Georgene Novelties (1938-1962)
- Knickerbocker Toy Co. (1963-1982)
- Applause Toy Company/Russ Berrie (1983-2011)
- Hasbro/Playskool (1983–present), master license
- Aurora World Inc. (2012–present (exclusive plush doll license)

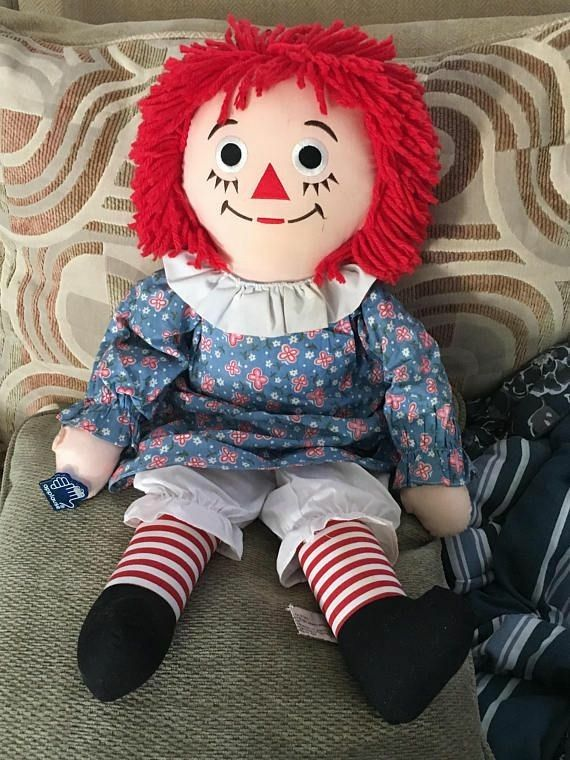
A Raggedy Ann doll made by Applause

=== Doll production ===
Although the female members of Gruelle's family may have originally handmade a few of the versions of the Raggedy Ann doll in Norwalk, Connecticut, to help market the related books, Gruelle soon established a merchandising agreement with P. F. Volland Company, the primary publisher of his books, to manufacture, sell, and promote a mass-produced, commercial version of the Raggedy Ann doll. Early Raggedy Ann and Andy dolls were manufactured by different companies and not produced as matched sets.

Between 1918 and 1926, the Non-Breakable Toy Company of Muskegon, Michigan, made more than 75,000 dolls for Volland. By the late 1920s, Volland's orders for Raggedy Ann dolls from its manufacturer had reached 4,000 per month. When Volland ceased operations during the Great Depression, it had already sold more than 150,000 dolls and nearly 2 million Raggedy Ann books.

In 1935, Gruelle granted permission to the Exposition Doll and Toy Manufacturing Company to manufacture and sell authorized versions of the Raggedy Ann and Andy dolls. From 1935 until 1937, Molly-'Es Doll Outfitters manufactured and sold unauthorized versions of the Raggedy Ann and Andy dolls until a legal decision handed down in Gruelle v (Mollye) Goldman prohibited Molly-'Es Dolls from further manufacturing and sales of the dolls.

=== Sewing patterns for homemade dolls ===
- McCall's pattern
  - 1940 McCall's pattern #820, first appeared for a 19-in. dolls, Raggedy Ann doll comes with cape pattern
  - ca. 1945 McCall's pattern #914, Raggedy Ann Awake/Asleep dolls plus camel with the wrinkled knees
  - 1958 McCall's pattern #820, appeared with a slightly modified pattern for both dolls
  - 1963 McCall's pattern #6941, Raggedy Ann pattern has lost her cape, dolls now come in three sizes
  - 1970 McCall's pattern #2531, dolls come in three sizes, with a simplified pattern and different hair and face embroidery pattern, loss of button eyes
  - 1977 McCall's pattern #5713, identical to previous #2531 pattern, different cover
  - ca. 1980 new McCall's pattern # 7131, 36-in. dolls plus apron a child can wear
  - 1982 McCall's pattern #8077, a re-issue of previous patterns, new cover, dolls with different hair color
- Late 1990s, Simplicity Patterns released a licensed doll pattern for a different design doll in four sizes.
- 2015 saw another Simplicity pattern (Pattern number 8043) for 3 different sized dolls of both Raggedy Ann and Raggedy Andy. 15",26"and 36" are available. This pattern was called the Classic Raggedy Ann & Andy and copyrighted by Simon & Schuster.

== Public collections ==
Gruelle's hometown of Arcola, Illinois, is the former home of the annual Raggedy Ann and Andy Festival and the Raggedy Ann and Andy Museum. The museum was closed and the festival discontinued in 2009. Some of the museum's contents were donated to Strong National Museum of Play. Other aspects of the collection were moved to the Rockome Gardens theme park in Arcola.
