= Margaret Hoberg Turrell =

American composer

Margaret B. Hoberg Turrell (1890 – 1948) was an American composer and organist who published her music under the name Margaret Hoberg. She was also a philanthropist who co-founded the Turrell Fund with her husband.

== Early life ==
Hoberg was born in 1890 in Terre Haute, Indiana. She began performing publicly on the piano in Terre Haute when she was twelve years old. She studied music for one year in Berlin, two years in Paris, and in New York City, where she gave concerts of her compositions and worked as an organist. In 1916, Hoberg received a fellowship to study at MacDowell.

== Career ==
Her "Harp Concerto" premiered at Carnegie Hall in 1919. Hoberg's music was published by M. Witmark & Sons, Oliver Ditson Co. and Arthur P. Schmidt Co. She published her music under the name Margaret Hoberg.

== Personal life ==
She married Herbert Turrell in 1922, a year after his first wife died. In 1935, the couple established the Turrell Fund to aid at-risk children. The Fund donated a total of $238,621,996 between 1935 and 2018, and remains active today. She died in 1948.

== Compositions ==
=== Chamber ===
- Allegro Maestoso (harp, violin and organ)
- Calm (harp, violin and organ)
- Country Dance (harp)
- Log Cabin Sketches (alternate title: Two Suites for Harp)

=== Orchestra ===
- Harp Concerto (also arranged for harp and organ)

=== Vocal ===
- "Hiawatha's Vision" (baritone and piano)
- Little Orphant Annie (choir; text by James Whitcomb Riley)
- Maid of the Mist (women's choir; text by Colgate Baker)
- "Such a Starved Bank of Moss" (text by Robert Browning)
- "When We Two Parted"
