= Kid Brands =

American Toy Company

Kid Brands, Inc.
- Company type: Public
- Traded as: Expert Market: KIDBQ
- Founded: Oakland, New Jersey (1963)
- Founder: Russell Berrie
- Fate: Bankrupted
- Headquarters: East Rutherford, New Jersey
- Key people: Guy Paglinco, CFO; David Sabin, Division President; Richard Schaub Jr., Division President, Glenn Langberg (CRO)
- Products: Infant and Juvenile Consumer Products
- Number of employees: 304

Kid Brands, Inc. (Expert Market: KID) was a company that designed, developed and distributed infant and juvenile branded products. These products were distributed through mass market, baby super stores, specialty, food, drug, independent, and e-commerce retailers worldwide.

The company’s operating business were composed of four wholly owned subsidiaries: Kids Line, LLC; LaJobi, Inc.; Sassy, Inc.; and CoCaLo, Inc. These subsidiaries designed and marketed branded infant and juvenile products in a number of complementary categories, including infant bedding and related nursery accessories and décor, food preparation and nursery appliances, and diaper bags (Kids Line and CoCaLo); nursery furniture and related products (LaJobi); and developmental toys and feeding, bath and baby care items with features that addressed the various stages of an infant’s early years (Sassy). In addition to the company’s branded products, the company also marketed certain categories or products under various licenses, including Carter's, Disney, Graco, and Serta.

Kid Brands was founded in 1963 was based in East Rutherford, New Jersey. The company had operations in southern California, New Jersey, Michigan, and in some foreign countries.

== History ==
The company, formerly known as Russ Berrie and Company, was named after its founder, the late Mr. Russell Berrie (1933-2002, aged 69), originated as a maker of stuffed animals, other toys and gifts.

As it transitioned into a pure play infant and juvenile company, it acquired the following companies:

- Sassy, Inc. (Summer 2001)
- Kids Line LLC (December 2004)
- CoCaLo, Inc. and LaJobi, Inc. (April 2008)

In December 2008, the company divested its gift business operations to The Russ Companies, Inc. (TRC), previously The Encore Group. The Company retained the Russ and Applause brands, and licensed them to TRC.

To support the company’s focus on growing a leadership position in the infant and juvenile industry, on September 23, 2009, Russ Berrie received shareholder approval to change its corporate name to Kid Brands, Inc. Along with the new name, the company’s common stock began trading under the symbol NYSE: KID.

By April 2011, The Russ Companies filed for Chapter 7 Liquidation Bankruptcy and no longer exists as an entity. A number of investors purchased its inventory, including its Barbie Pets and Raggedy Ann & Andy brands.

As of 2011, Kid Brands continued to produce mattresses and other bedding. It was reportedly unclear what would happen to Applause after the brand was licensed out.

== Shining Stars ==
The Shining Stars program was introduced in partnership with the International Star Registry. Russ Berrie's Shining Star Friends product line was introduced to market the program.

A message on the Shining Stars website states that, "Russ Berrie Inc. the licensor of the Shining Stars brand filed for Chapter 7 Bankruptcy on 26th April 2011 and therefore we apologize that the Shining Stars website associated with the Russ Berrie Shining Star products is no longer maintained."

The promise of a second generation of Shining Star toys in 2012 had failed to materialize by the beginning of 2013, with no further updates having been made as of January 2016.

== Philanthropy ==
The Russ Berrie Institute for Professional Sales at William Paterson University is named after Russ Berrie.

In 1993, Russ Berrie made a gift of $1 million to build a new performing arts center and learning facility at Ramapo College, in Mahwah, New Jersey called, "The Angelica and Russ Berrie Center for Performing Arts".
