= Johnny Gruelle =

American cartoonist (December 24 1880 – January 9 1938)

- Born: John Barton Gruelle; December 24, 1880; Arcola, Illinois, U.S.
- Died: January 9, 1938 (aged 57); Miami Springs, Florida, U.S.
- Occupations: Artist, writer
- Writing career
- Genres: Children's literature, comic strip
- Notable works: Raggedy Ann Stories (1918), The Magical Land of Noom (1922), and other books; Raggedy Ann and Raggedy Andy characters

John Barton Gruelle (December 24, 1880 – January 9, 1938) was an American artist, political cartoonist, children's book and comics author, illustrator, and storyteller. He is best known as the creator of Raggedy Ann and Raggedy Andy dolls and as the author/illustrator of dozens of books. He also created the Beloved Belindy doll. Gruelle also contributed cartoons and illustrations to at least ten newspapers, four major news syndicates, and more than a dozen national magazines. He was the son of Hoosier Group painter Richard Gruelle.

== Early life and education ==
Gruelle was born in Arcola, Illinois, on December 24, 1880, to Alice (Benton) and Richard Buckner Gruelle. In 1882, when Gruelle was two years old, he moved with his parents to Indianapolis, Indiana, and settled in a home on Tacoma Avenue in what is the present-day Lockerbie Square Historic District. The Gruelles made Indianapolis their home for more than twenty-five years.

Gruelle was exposed to art and literature at an early age. His father, Richard, was a self-taught portrait and landscape painter who became associated with the Hoosier Group of American Impressionist painters. In addition to Richard Gruelle, the informal group included William Forsyth, T. C. Steele, Otto Stark, and J. Ottis Adams. Another Gruelle family friends was Hoosier poet James Whitcomb Riley, whose poems "The Elf-Child," later titled "Little Orphant Annie" (1885), and "The Raggedy Man" (1888), eventually formed the name for John Gruelle's iconic Raggedy Ann character. Gruelle later honored Riley's memory in his own book, The Orphant Annie Story Book (1921), written in tribute to Riley's famous poem.

Gruelle was the eldest child of the Gruelle family, which also included a younger sister, Prudence (1884–1966), and a brother, Justin (1889–1979). Gruelle's parents exposed all three children to music, literature, and art. John, who likely attended public schools in Indianapolis as a youth, became interested in art, and learned drawing from his father. Prudence trained as a vocalist in New York City, performed in vaudeville theaters, and married Albert Matzke, an illustrator and watercolorist. She also became an author of children's books and a syndicated newspaper columnist. Justin studied art in Indianapolis and New York City and became a landscape painter, illustrator, and muralist.

== Marriage and family ==
Nineteen-year-old Gruelle met his future wife, Myrtle J. Swann, in Indianapolis, where they were married on March 23, 1901. Marcella, the first of their three children, was born on August 18, 1902, and died on November 8, 1915, at age 13. The Gruelles also had two sons, Worth, who became an artist and illustrator, and Richard "Dick" Gruelle. Gruelle's widow, Myrtle (Swann) Gruelle Silsby, who remarried for a brief period in 1945, died on April 25, 1968, at the age of eighty-three.

John and Myrtle Gruelle began their married life in Indianapolis and moved with their young daughter to Cleveland, Ohio. By 1910 they had left Cleveland and moved to the Norwalk, Connecticut, area, where Gruelle's parents had acquired a 16-acre (6.5-hectare) property in Silvermine, a present-day historic district and art colony along the Silvermine River comprising sections of Norwalk, New Canaan, and Wilton, Connecticut. Gruelle and his family initially lived in a studio maintained by his father and brother on the former site of the Blanchard Fur Factory until they built a home in the Wilton section of Silvermine. Gruelle's parents, his sister and her husband, and his younger brother also made their home in the Silvermine area. After the death of their daughter, Marcella, in 1915 from an infected smallpox vaccine, John and Myrtle Gruelle moved with their two sons to Norwalk. In addition to being closer to his family, Gruelle's relocation to the East Coast provided him with additional opportunities for freelance work in newspapers and magazines as an artist and journalist.

Gruelle also spent a year in Ashland, Oregon, from 1923 to 1924.

== Career ==
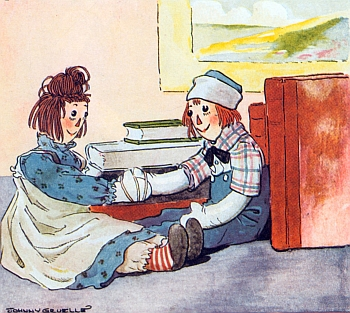
Raggedy Ann and Andy

Gruelle began his career as an illustrator and cartoonist for Indianapolis newspapers. His work was eventually syndicated nationwide. He also completed commissions for illustrations of well-known fairy tales, as well as writing and illustrating his own stories. Gruelle is best known as the creator of a series of stories about a rag doll named Raggedy Ann and her friends. He also created the iconic Raggedy Ann and Raggedy Andy dolls. In addition to becoming a successful commercial artist and illustrator, cartoonist, writer, and businessman, Gruelle was a nature-lover, storyteller, and spiritualist.

=== Early years ===
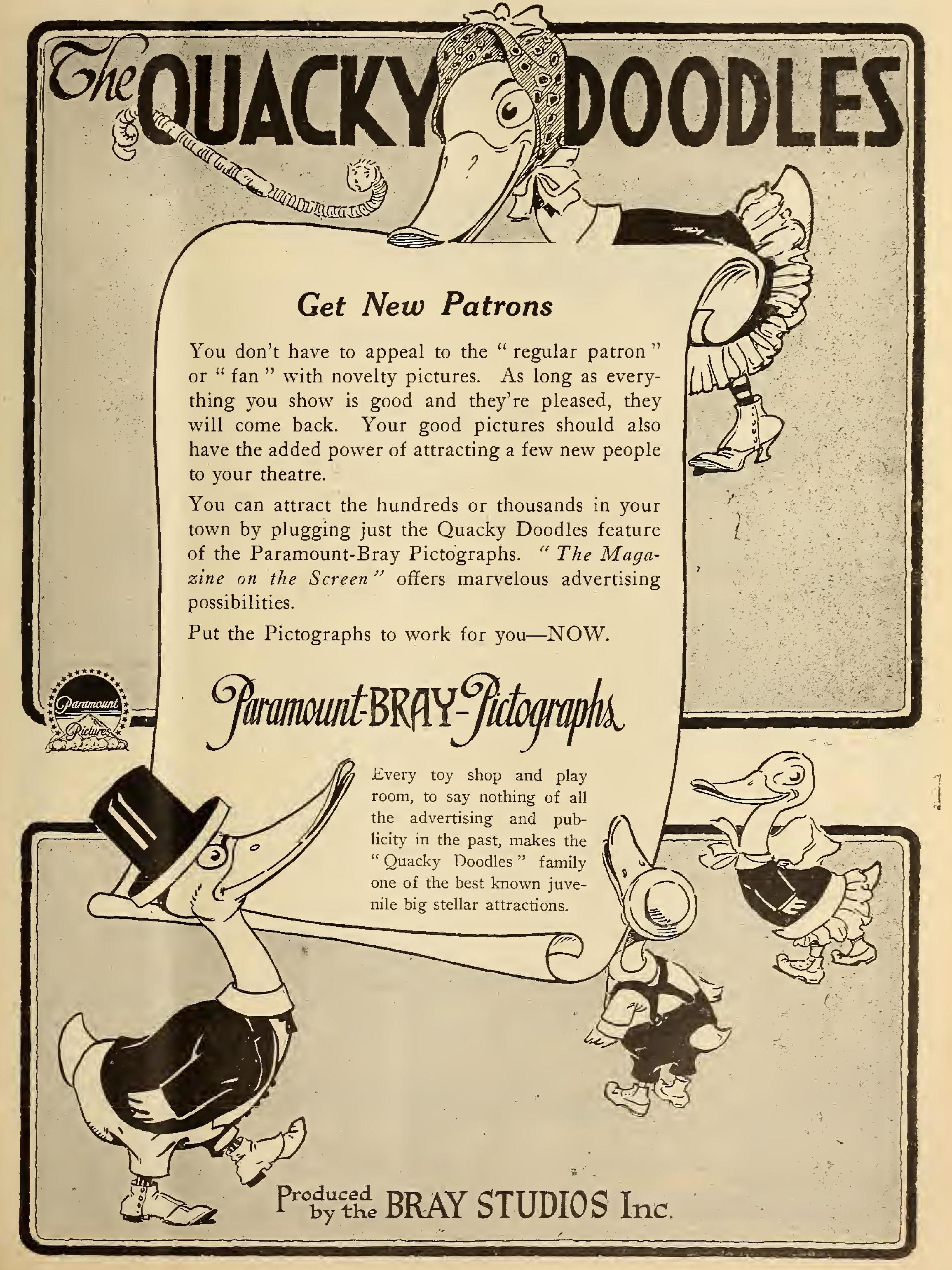
"The Quacky Doodles" 1917 ad by Paramount-Bray Pictographs in Motion Picture News

In the early years of his career Gruelle created political cartoons and single-frame sports comics that appeared in Indianapolis newspapers such as the Indianapolis Star and the Indianapolis Daily Sentinel. In 1903 he became assistant illustrator for the Star. Within a few months his political cartoons of a top-hatted crow began to appear on the front page of the Star with witty comments for the day. Gruelle's crow figure also became the Star's weather bird and continued to appear on the newspaper's front page even after Gruelle's death in 1938. (The bird was initially named "Jim Crow," but it was renamed "Joe Crow" in the 1950s.)

From 1906 to 1911, Gruelle's cartoons, usually signed as Grue, appeared in other city newspapers, such as The Toledo News-Bee, the Pittsburgh Press, the Tacoma Times, the Spokane Press, and the Cleveland Press. Gruelle's big break came in 1910–1911, when his two entries for a full-page, comic-drawing contest sponsored by the New York Herald won first and second place among the submissions from 1,500 entrants. His first-place entry, "Mr. Twee Deedle", was syndicated in weekly installments nationwide until 1918.

As Gruelle earned notoriety as a cartoonist for the Herald, he also pursued writing and illustrating his own fairy tales. His first major illustrating commission was a single-volume edition of Grimm's Fairy Tales (1914) that included Gruelle's artwork for eleven full-color plates. In other early commission work he illustrated and retold other fairy tales that included the stories of "Cinderella," "Little Red Riding Hood," and "Hansel and Gretel," among others. He also wrote and illustrated My Very Own Fairy Stories (1917), published by P. F. Volland Company, a publisher of inspirational cards, gifts, and books. Beginning with these early stories, Gruelle typically used a "fairy-story-with-a-moral format" to teach the ethical lessons that became a trademark of his work. Gruelle also created a cartoon series in 1917 called Quacky Doodles, produced as part of Bray Productions' weekly Paramount Pictograph productions.

=== Creator of Raggedy Ann ===
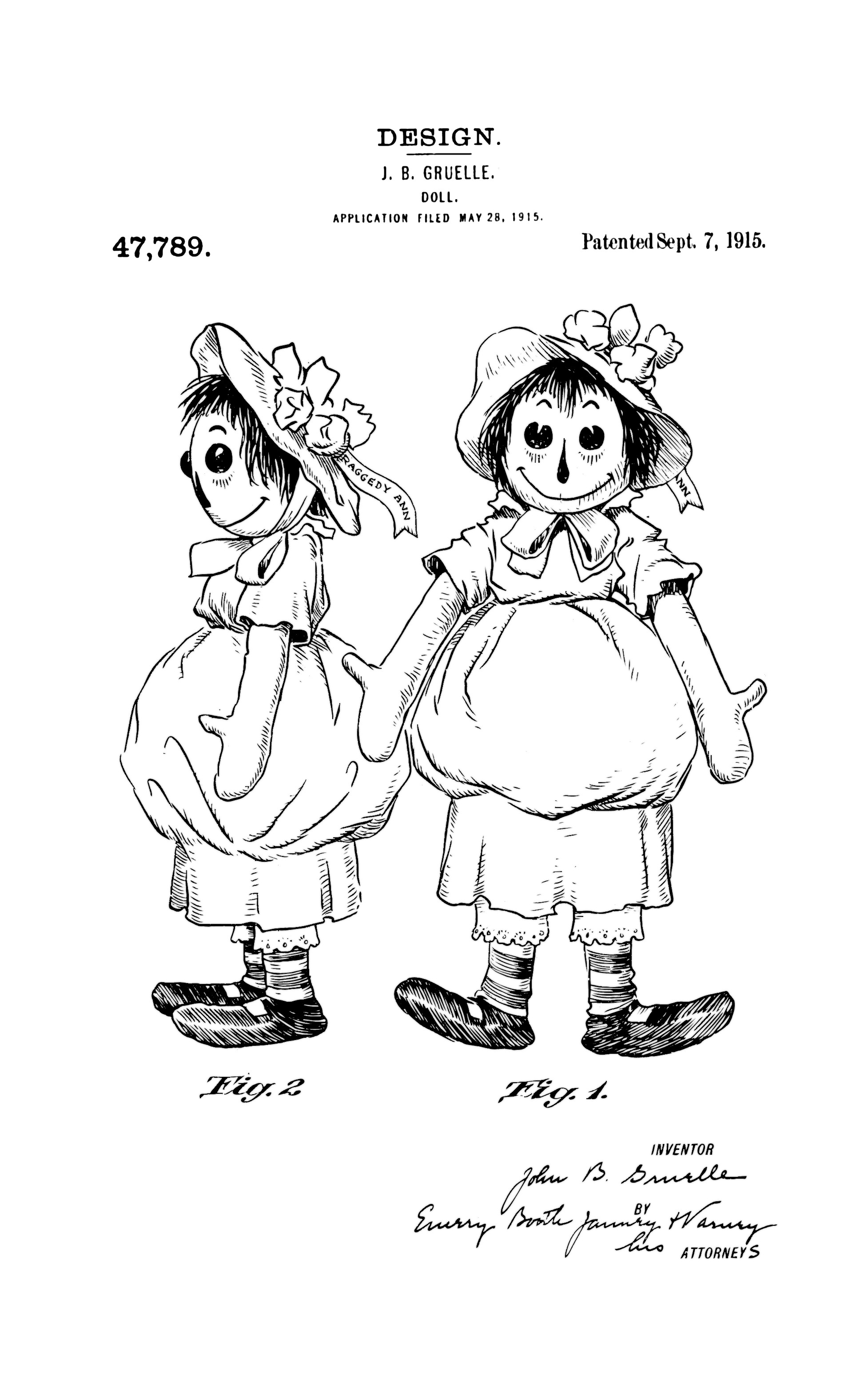
Gruelle's U.S. Patent design for the Raggedy Ann doll

The exact details of the origins of the Raggedy Ann doll and related stories are uncertain. Gruelle biographer Patricia Hall notes that according to an oft-repeated myth, Gruelle's daughter, Marcella, brought from her grandmother's attic a faceless rag doll on which the artist drew a face, and that Gruelle suggested that Marcella's grandmother sew a shoe button for a missing eye. Hall says the date of this supposed occurrence is given as early as 1900 and as late as 1914, with the locale variously given as suburban Indianapolis, Indiana, downtown Cleveland, Ohio, or Wilton, Connecticut. More likely, as Gruelle's wife, Myrtle, told Hall, Gruelle retrieved a long-forgotten, homemade rag doll from the attic of his parents' Indianapolis home sometime around the turn of the 20th century, a few years before the couple's daughter was born. As Myrtle Gruelle recalled, "There was something he wanted from the attic. While he was rummaging around for it, he found an old rag doll his mother had made for his sister. He said then that the doll would make a good story." She further explained that her husband "kept [the doll] in his mind until we had Marcella. He remembered it when he saw her play [with] dolls.... He wrote the stories around some of the things she did. He used to get ideas from watching her."

Hall notes another unproven legend states that Gruelle began writing and illustrating the Raggedy Ann stories while his daughter was gravely ill from complications resulting from an infected vaccination, and her death at age 13 inspired him to publish the stories and create the rag doll as a tribute to her memory. Another version of the doll's origins suggests that it appeared as a character in an illustrated poem in one of Gruelle's earlier books. Some journalistic sources have continued to repeat the various myths and legends.

A few of the details about the Raggedy Ann doll and its origins are documented. On September 7, 1915, the U.S. Patent Office approved U.S. patent D47789, Gruelle's May 28, 1915, patent application for the design of the prototype that became the Raggedy Ann doll. Gruelle's patent application for the doll's design was already in progress around the time that his daughter, Marcella, became ill. The artist received final approval for the U.S. patent the same month as her death. On June 17, 1915, Gruelle applied for a trademark logo for the Raggedy Ann name, which he formed from a combination of names from two James Whitcomb Riley poems, "The Raggedy Man" and "Little Orphant Annie." The P. F. Volland Company published Gruelle's Raggedy Ann Stories (1918), the first in a series of books about his Raggedy Ann rag-doll character and her friends. Both became major successes. The book's first edition also included Gruelle's own version of the doll's origins and the related stories.

Although the female members of Gruelle's family may have made initial versions of the Raggedy Ann doll in Norwalk, Connecticut, to help market the related books, Gruelle soon established a merchandising agreement with P. F. Volland Company, his primary publisher, to begin manufacturing, selling, and promoting a mass-produced version of the doll. Raggedy Ann books and dolls became major successes. Two years later Gruelle introduced Raggedy Ann's brother, the mischievous and adventuresome Raggedy Andy, in Raggedy Andy Stories (1920). Gruelle also patented his design for a generic male doll (U.S. patent D56149). A short time after its literary debut, Raggedy Andy appeared as a Volland-made doll. Gruelle was also awarded design patents for two duck toys in 1915. U.S. patent D47787 is based on his character "Quacky Doodles" and U.S. patent D47788 is based on his character "Danny Daddles." In addition, Gruelle applied for a stuffed elephant toy (U.S. patent D56608) in 1920 and a stuffed bear toy (U.S. patent D59553) in 1921.

=== Other projects ===
In addition to the Raggedy Ann books, Gruelle continued to write and illustrate other works for children that included Friendly Stories (1919), another volume of his fairy stories. During the 1920s and 1930s he wrote and illustrated The Magical Land of Noom (1922), published by P. F. Volland Company, and the Orphant Annie Story Book (1921) and Johnny Mouse and the Wishing Stick (1922) for Indianapolis-based publisher Bobbs-Merrill Company. (Bobbs-Merrill became the authorized publisher and licensor for Raggedy Ann-related literary works in 1962.) The success of Gruelle's early books launched his career as a children's author/illustrator. While continuing to work on commissions for newspapers and magazines, he authored and illustrated at least one Raggedy Ann and Raggedy Andy story each year.

On November 27, 1929, the New York Herald Tribune Syndicate launched "Brutus," a domestic-comedy comic strip with elements of fantasy. Gruelle continued to work on this comic strip until his death in 1938.

Gruelle also wrote lyrics for musical compositions that were published as sheet music and songbooks for children. His lyrics in "Raggedy Ann's Sunny Songs" (1930) was set to music by William H. Woodin, a former U. S. Treasury Secretary. (It is likely that one of Gruelle's characters, "Little Wooden Willie," was named for the politician.) Other sheet music included "Beyond the Moon" (1931) with lyrics by Gruelle and Johnny Mercer, music by Guy Stevens; and "Beneath the Southern Skies" (1931) with lyrics by Gruelle and Joan Jasmyn, music by M. K. Jerome. Other Gruelle children's songbooks and recordings include the Richard Wolfe Children's Chorus performing on a recording of "A Raggedy Ann Songbook" (1996).

== Later years ==
Gruelle and his wife relocated from Connecticut, to the Miami, Florida, area in 1932. In his later years Gruelle continued to write and illustrate books such as Raggedy Ann and the Golden Meadow (1935), which was completed with the assistance of his son, Worth. The father-and-son duo also collaborated on a series of illustrated Raggedy Ann proverbs that were syndicated in newspapers. In addition, Gruelle produced humorous cartoons and made public appearances, but took time away from work to pursue his hobby of collecting automobiles. Although the Great Depression of the 1930s caused some setbacks that included the bankruptcy of his primary publisher, P. F. Volland, and a lawsuit for patent and trademark infringement that he finally won on appeal in 1937, Gruelle and his family continued to experience an active life in Florida until stress took its toll on Gruelle's health.

== Death and legacy ==
Gruelle died unexpectedly of heart failure at his son Worth's home in Miami Springs, Florida, on January 9, 1938, two weeks after his fifty-seventh birthday. Following Gruelle's death, his widow, Myrtle (Swann) Gruelle, took legal action to secure the rights to his works, trademarks, and patents. She also continued her efforts to promote his legacy through the Johnny Gruelle Company, the Bobbs-Merrill Company, and other commercial agreements.

In a career that spanned forty years, Gruelle was an author and/or illustrator of dozens of books and contributed cartoons and illustrations to at least ten newspapers, four major new syndicates, and more than a dozen national magazines. Despite the diversity of his work, Gruelle is best known as the illustrator, author, and the creator of the Raggedy Ann doll and related books, illustrations, and characters. By the time of his death in 1938, his first Raggedy Ann book had sold more than 3 million copies. The iconic Raggedy Ann and Raggedy Andy dolls that Gruelle designed and their related memorabilia have become sought-after collector's items.

Gruelle also left a legacy of other artistic and literary works. Although he was inspired by many sources and most of his work was based on traditional European folktales, Gruelle developed his own storytelling style. Many of his stories for children included parables about the virtues of "sharing, compassion, and telling the truth." In addition to his prose, Gruelle used his illustrations to tell stories of magical lands, fanciful animals, and memorable characters, especially Raggedy Ann, Raggedy Andy, and their friends. While his early artwork used a romantic, dreamlike style that frequently included the gold-and-violet palette of his father, among other American Impressionists, Gruelle's later illustrations used a brighter color palette. Animation historian Donald Crafton described Gruelle's illustrations as having a typically "clean, curvilinear style that looks ahead to the Disney graphics of the 1930s."

Cartoonists such as Sidney Smith, Theodor Geisel (Dr. Seuss), and Mary Engelbreit have named Gruelle among those who have inspired their work. Gruelle's own creative work continues through the ongoing production of the Raggedy Ann and Raggedy Andy dolls and related items, numerous reprints of Gruelle's books, and adaptions of his work that includes numerous comic books, audio recordings, animated films, theatrical scripts and screenplays.

== Honors and tributes ==
- Gruelle's Raggedy Ann doll was inducted into National Toy Hall of Fame in Rochester, New York, in 2002; Raggedy Andy was inducted in 2007.
- "Raggedy Ann in Ashland" was a segment of As It Was, a Southern Oregon Historical Society radio series that aired on Jefferson Public Radio in the early 2000s. The segment relates to the year that Gruelle spent in Ashland, Oregon, in 1923–24.

== Selected published works ==
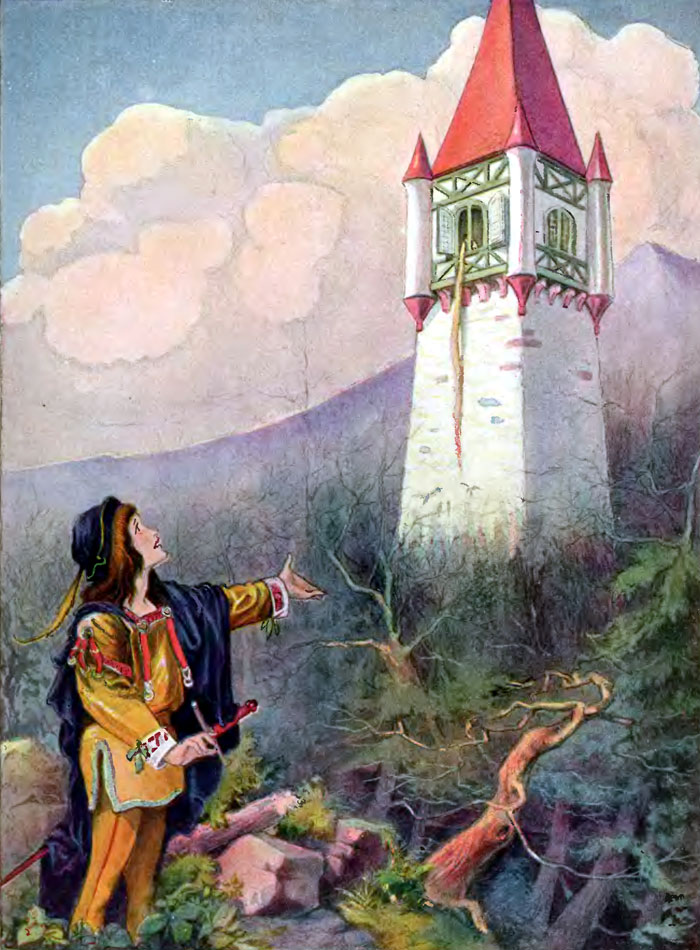
Rapunzel, from an edition of Grimm's Fairy Tales, illustrated by Johnny Gruelle

=== Written and illustrated by Gruelle ===
- Mr. Twee Deedle (1913)
- Mr Twee Deedle's Further Adventures (1914)
- The Travels of Timmy Toodles (1916)
- My Very Own Fairy Stories (1917) Republished as Raggedy Ann's Fairy Stories (1928) and Raggedy Ann and Andy's Very Own Fairy Stories (1970)
- The Funny Little Book (1918)
- Raggedy Ann Stories (1918)
- Friendly Fairies (1919)
- Little Sunny Stories (1919)
- Raggedy Andy Stories (1920)
- The Little Brown Bear (1920)
- Orphant Annie Story Book (1921)
- Eddie Elephant (1921)
- Johnny Mouse and the Wishing Stick (1922), republished as Adventures of Johnny Mouse (2012)
- The Magical Land of Noom (1922)
- Raggedy Ann and Andy and the Camel with the Wrinkled Knees (1924)
- Raggedy Andy's Number Book (1924)
- Raggedy Ann's Wishing Pebble (1925)
- Raggedy Ann's Alphabet Book (1925)
- Beloved Belindy (1926)
- The Paper Dragon: A Raggedy Ann Adventure (1926)
- Wooden Willie (1927)
- Raggedy Ann's Magical Wishes (1928)
- Marcella: A Raggedy Ann Story (1929)
- The Cheery Scarecrow (1929)
- Raggedy Ann in the Deep Deep Woods (1930)
- Raggedy Ann's Sunny Songs (1930), words and illustrations by Johnny Gruelle, music by Will Woodin
- The Cruise of the Rickety-Robin (1931)
- Raggedy Ann in Cookie Land (1931)
- Raggedy Ann's Lucky Pennies (1932)
- Raggedy Ann Cut-Out Paper Doll (1935)
- Raggedy Ann's Little Brother Andy Cut-Out Paper Doll (1935)
- Raggedy Ann in the Golden Meadow (1935)
- Raggedy Ann and the Left-Handed Safety Pin (1935)
- Raggedy Ann's Joyful Songs (1937), lyrics and illustrations by Johnny Gruelle, music by Charles Miller
- Raggedy Ann and Maizie Moocow (1937)
- Johnny Gruelle's Golden Book (1946)

=== Written by Gruelle; illustrated by others ===
- Raggedy Ann in the Magic Book (1939)
- Raggedy Ann and the Laughing Brook (1940)
- Raggedy Ann and the Golden Butterfly (1940)
- Raggedy Ann Helps Grandpa Hoppergrass (1940)
- Raggedy Ann and the Hoppy Toad (1940)
- Raggedy Ann in the Garden (1940)
- Raggedy Ann Goes Sailing (1941)
- The Camel with the Wrinkled Knees (1941)
- Raggedy Ann and Andy and the Nice Fat Policeman (1942)
- Raggedy Ann and Betsy Bonnet String (1943)
- Raggedy Ann in the Snow White Castle (1946)
- Raggedy Ann and the Golden Ring (1961)
- Raggedy Ann and the Hobby Horse (1961)
- Raggedy Ann and the Happy Meadow (1961)
- Raggedy Ann and the Wonderful Witch (1961)
- Raggedy Ann and Andy and the Kindly Ragman (1975)
- Raggedy Ann and Andy and the Witchie Kissabye (1975)

=== Adaptations attributed to Gruelle, or based on his works ===
- Raggedy Ann and Andy—with Animated Illustrations (1944)

=== Compilation and/or reprints of Gruelle's works ===
- My Fairy Stories (2012), a collection of stories from My Very Own Fairy Stories
- Friendly Gnomes (2012), a collection of stories from Friendly Fairies

=== Illustrated by Gruelle; written by others ===
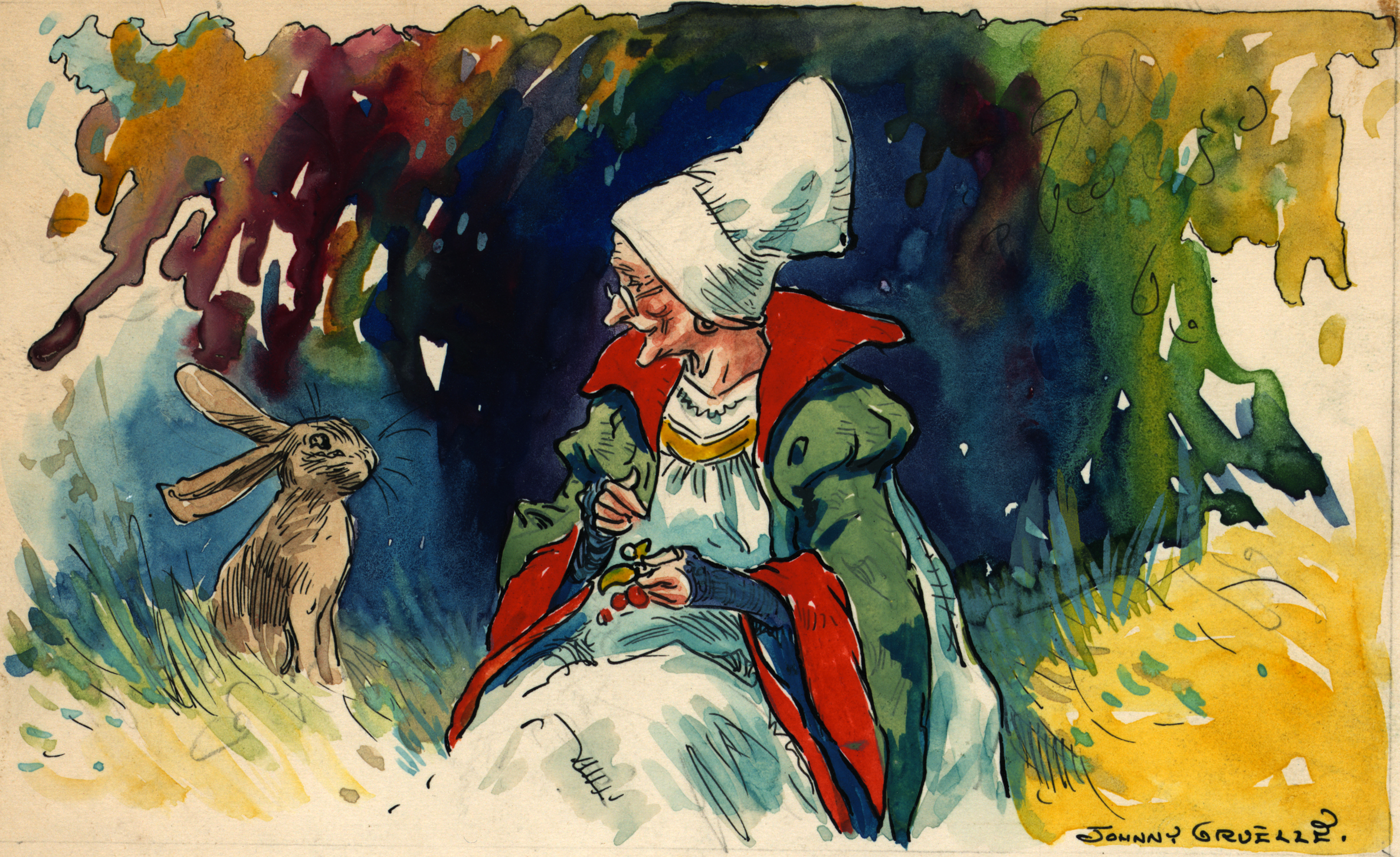
The character "Sally Migrundy" from the anthology Friendly Fairies (1919)

- Grimm's Fairy Tales (1914)
- Nobody's Boy (Sans Famille) (1916)
- Quacky Doodles' and Danny Daddles' Book (1916))
- Rhymes for Kindly Children: Modern Mother Goose Jingles (1916)
- All About Cinderella (1916), republished as Cinderella (2012)
- All About Little Red Riding Hood (1916)
- All About Mother Goose (1916)
- All About Hansel and Grethel (1917), republished as Hansel and Gretel (2012)
- All About the Little Small Red Hen (1917)
- All About Little Black Sambo (1917)
- Children's Favorite Fairy Tales: The Stories that Never Grow Old (1918)
- Sunny Bunny (1918)
- The Bam Bam Clock (1920)
- Grimm's Fairy Stories (1922)
- Man in the Moon Stories Told Over the Radio-Phone: First Stories for Children Broadcasted by Radio (1922)
- The Gingerbread Man (1930)
