= Little Orphant Annie (1918 film) =

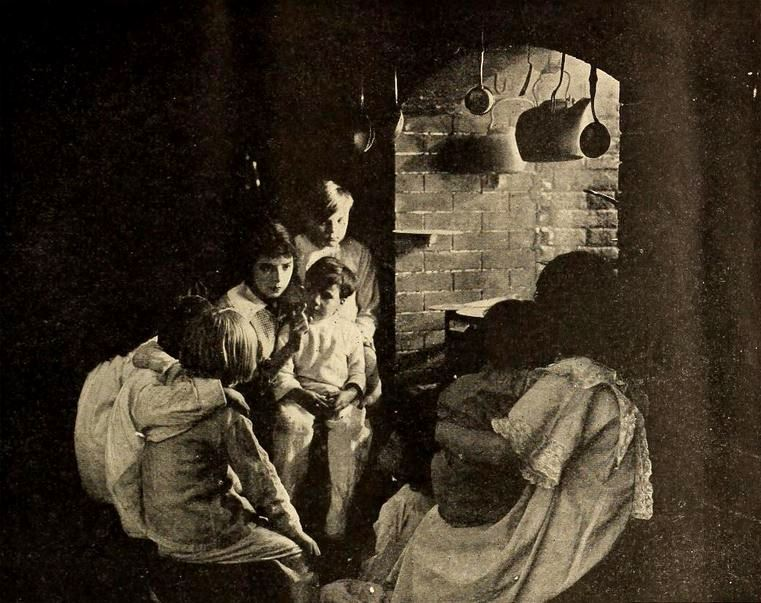
- Film still
- Directed by: Colin Campbell
- Written by: Gilson Willets (scenario)
- Story by: James Whitcomb Riley
- Based on: "Little Orphant Annie" by James Whitcomb Riley
- Produced by: William Nicholas Selig
- Starring: Colleen Moore; Tom Santschi; Harry Lonsdale; Eugenie Besserer
- Cinematography: Charles Stumar
- Production company: Selig Polyscope Company
- Distributed by: Pioneer Film Corporation (1918); World Film Company (1919)
- Release date: December 1918
- Country: United States
- Languages: Silent; English intertitles

Little Orphant Annie is a 1918 American silent drama film directed by Colin Campbell and stars Colleen Moore, in her first leading role, as the title character. The film is based on James Whitcomb Riley's popular 1885 poem of the same title. Riley also appears in the film.

== Excerpt from Little Orphant Annie ==
Little Orphant Annie’s come to our house to stay,
An’ wash the cups an’ saucers up, an’ brush the crumbs away,
An’ shoo the chickens off the porch, an’ dust the hearth, an’ sweep,
An’ make the fire, an’ bake the bread, an’ earn her board-an’-keep;
An’ all us other children, when the supper things is done,
We set around the kitchen fire an’ has the mostest fun
A-list’nin to the witch-tales ‘at Annie tells about,
An the Gobble-uns ‘at gits you

Ef you

Don’t

Watch

Out!

== Plot ==
Little Orphant Annie (1918)

Annie, left orphaned after the death of her mother, goes to live in an orphanage, where she tells her fellow orphans stories of ghosts and goblins. The matron of the orphanage finds Annie's closest relative, the abusive Uncle Thomp. Her uncle puts her to hard work, doing hard labor on his farm, belittling her all the while. Big Dave, a neighbor and tough cow-poke, sees this and comes to her aid. Dave becomes her protector. Eventually Annie goes to live with Squire Goode and his large family. There, she entertains the children of the household with her stories but sees her abusive aunt and uncle as her chief tormentors. She tells stories of how the goblins will take away the children if they are not good. Each story she tells is illustrated. War breaks out, and Dave, whom Annie adores, enlists. Uncle Thomp, hearing that Dave has been killed in action, takes pleasure in telling Annie the news. Broken-hearted, Annie falls ill and dies in bed, surrounded by family.

== Cast ==
- Colleen Moore as Annie
- Tom Santschi as Dave Johnson
- Harry Lonsdale as Annie's Uncle
- Eugenie Besserer as Mrs. Goode
- Doris Baker as Orphan
- Baby Lillian Wade as Orphan (as Lillian Wade)
- Ben Alexander as Orphan
- Paul Jacobs as Orphan (as Billy Jacobs)
- George Hupp as Orphan
- James Whitcomb Riley as Himself (archive footage)
- Mae Gaston as Annie's Mother
- Lillian Hayward as Aunt Elizabeth
- Lafe McKee as The Good Squire
- Jean Stone as Little Annie as a Child

== Production notes ==
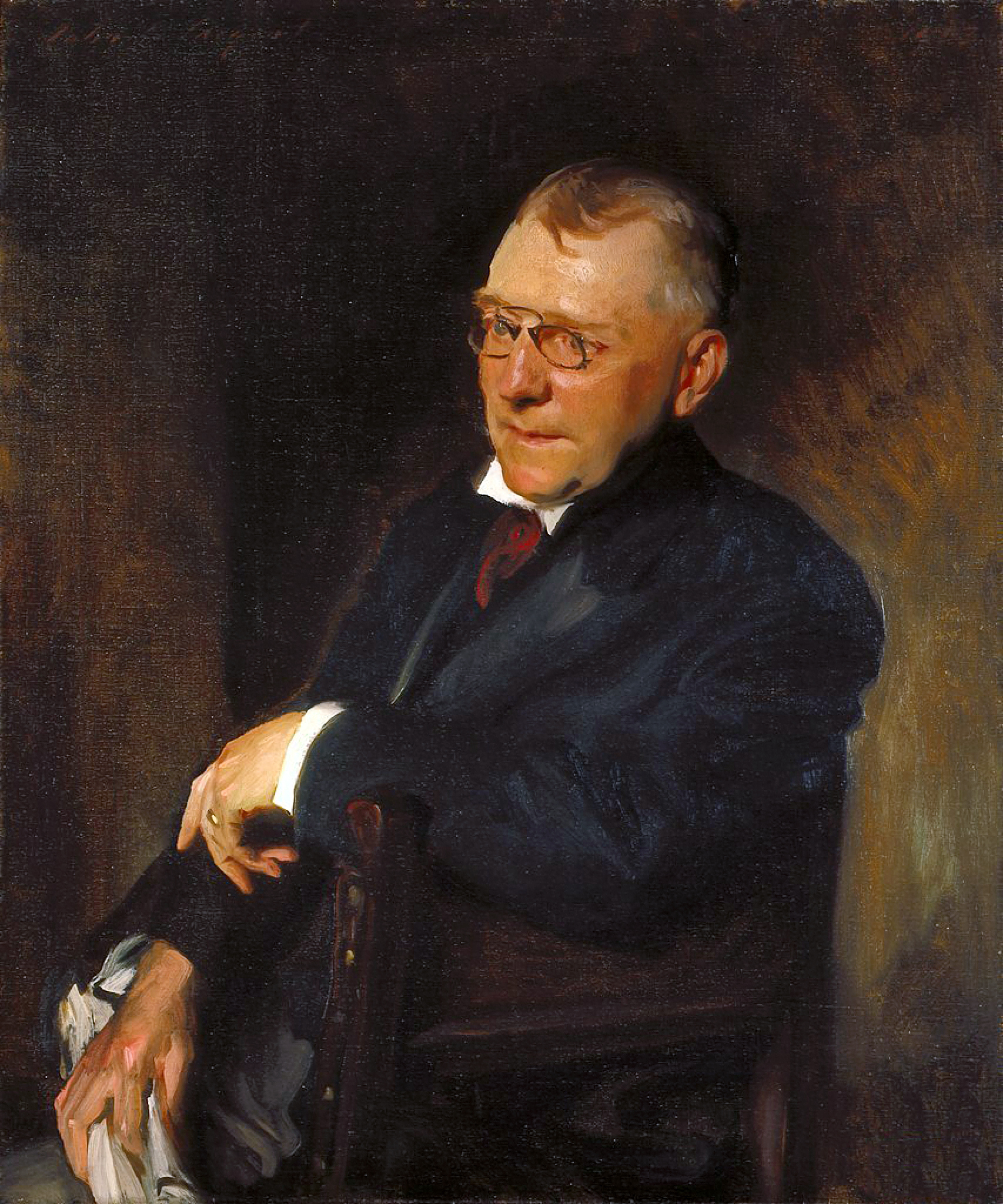
James Whitcomb Riley, 1903 portrait by John Singer Sargent.

The first draft of Little Orphant Annie was written by Gilson Willets and was a more straightforward adaptation of James Whitcomb Riley's poem, also containing elements of another Riley poem, "Where Is Mary Alice Smith". The script was apparently extensively re-written several times and became more of a loose adaptation of Riley's poem. Some outlines have Annie dying in the end and being reunited in heaven ("The Good World") with her mother, where she is wedded to Dave. The surviving version of the film has Annie fall ill, only to recover and learn Thomp's news was only a bad dream. Only two of the stories Annie tells (from the original poem) are illustrated.

The story is framed with footage of James Whitcomb Riley acting as a narrator of sorts. That footage had been filmed by Selig Polyscope Company for an earlier commissioned work by Inter-state Historical Pictures Corporation for a film about Indiana. The footage of Riley was most likely taken in early 1916, before Riley's death in July 1916. Principal photography began in early December 1917 in the San Francisco Bay Area and lasted through mid-1918.

Little Orphant Annie was one of the last films produced by Selig Polyscope Company. By the end of 1918, shortly before the film's December release, the company became insolvent and was absorbed by Fox Film Corporation. The film was initially distributed by Pioneer Film Corporation on a state's right basis. In March 1919, distribution rights were sold to World Film Company.

== Availability ==
A 16mm print of Little Orphant Annie survives and was released to home media; it was initially released on VHS by Facets, and on DVD by Grapevine Video. An extensive restoration took place in 2016, restoring several minutes to the film, sourced from several surviving prints. The film remains one of the few early performances of Colleen Moore that survives and is available to the public.
