= Applause (toy company) =

American Toy Company

Applause Inc.
- Company type: Private
- Industry: Stuffed toy
- Founded: 1966 as The Wallace Berrie Company
- Defunct: 2004
- Headquarters: 6101 Variel Avenue, P.O. Box 4183, Woodland Hills, California 91365-4183, U.S.A.
- Owner: Russ Berrie
- Number of employees: 600

Applause Inc. was a company that produced stuffed toys and collectible figurines. Its principal subsidiaries included Dakin Inc. and International Tropic-Cal Inc. The Applause brand survives as part of Kid Brands.

== History ==
The company was founded as The Wallace Berrie Company in 1966 by Wallace Berrie. In 1979, the company acquired the Applause division from Knickerbocker Toys. In 1986, the company changed its name to Applause Inc after a purchase by Jerrald A. Plebiew. In 1992, Applause released the Magic Trolls Babies toy line.

=== R. Dakin & Co. ===
On April 1, 1955, Richard Dakin, a San Francisco entrepreneur, started a business importing shotguns from Europe. In 1957, his son, Roger, joined and imported battery-operated trains, and the manufacturer also sent samples of small, sawdust-filled cotton-velveteen-covered toys. Roger quickly booked an order for three hundred pieces from a nearby department store. On 20 December 1966, Richard and Roger Dakin, their wives, and Roger Dakin's four children died in a plane crash.

=== Dakin merge ===
From 1991 to 1995, the company built a retail business by focusing on entertainment licensed brands with in-store merchandising displays.

In late 1995, the company acquired Dakin Inc., a stuffed animals company. This acquisition strengthened Applause's generic stuffed animal business to balance out its entertainment license portfolio.

Applause created a Strategic Alliances Group to oversee products for food-related and premium-based programs. In 1998, the company produced fast food toys for children's franchises.

=== Bankruptcy, suicide, and auction ===
In 2004, CEO Bob Solomon committed suicide once it became apparent the company was not going to survive. The company filed for bankruptcy shortly after his death. The Applause name was acquired by Russ Berrie in a bankruptcy auction.

=== Sources ===
- "Applause, a Novelty Maker, Sold to Management Group," The New York Times, September 26, 1997, p. C4(N)/D4(L).
- "Custom Warehousing, Distributor Services Pay; Dakin, Stafford Make a Winning Combination," Playthings, May 31, 1989, p. 10.
- "Applause to Sell Name; Bankrupt Toy Company's Label to be Shed for $4 Million," Los Angeles Daily News, September 30, 2004.
