= The Raggedy Man =

Poem by James Whitcomb Riley (1888)

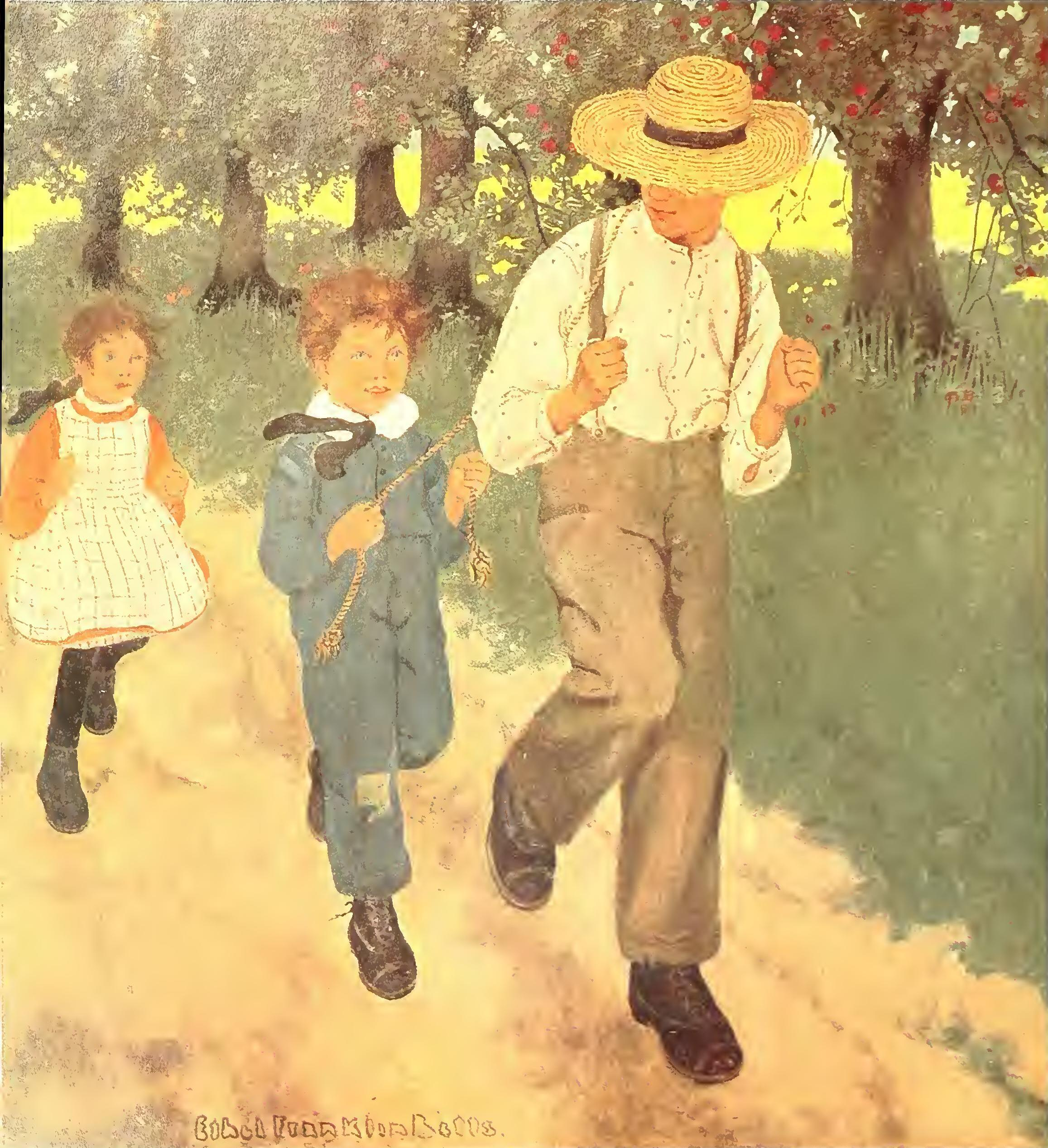
The Raggedy Man illustrated by Ethel Franklin Betts

The Raggedy Man is a poem written by James Whitcomb Riley and first published in 1888. The poem was the inspiration for the Raggedy Ann doll, and two films of the same name. The poem is one of Riley's most famous works. It was inspired by a German tramp employed by Riley's father during his youth.
